= Giulia de' Medici =

Illegitimate daughter of Alessandro de' Medici

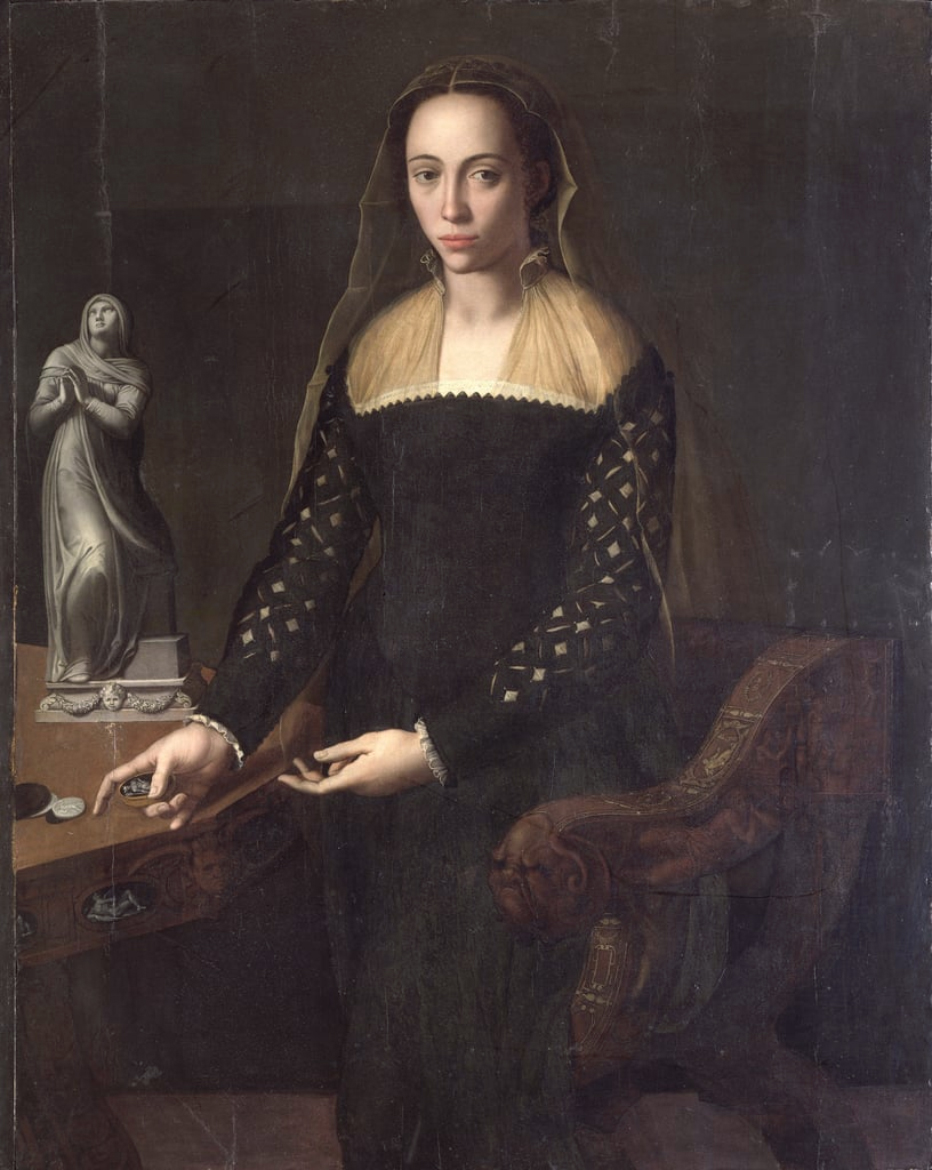

Duchess of Popoli
- Tenure: 1550 - 1559
- Full name: Giulia Romola di Alessandro de' Medici
- Born: c. 1535; Florence
- Died: c. 1588 (aged 52–53); Italy
- Noble family: Medici
- Spouses: Francesco Cantelmo (m. 1550; died 1556) Bernadetto de' Medici (m. 1559)
- Issue: Alessandro de' Medici
- Father: Alessandro de' Medici, Duke of Florence
- Mother: Taddea Malaspina

Giulia Romola di Alessandro de' Medici (c. 1535 – c. 1588) was the illegitimate daughter of Alessandro de' Medici, Duke of Florence and his mistress Taddea Malaspina.

Following her father's assassination, she was reared at the court of Cosimo I de' Medici and married advantageously twice.

== Early life ==
A child named Giulia Romola, with an unknown father, was baptized in Florence on November 5, 1535; this was probably Giulia. Close to this date, her father had commissioned a portrait of himself drawing a female profile in silverpoint. Art historians believe the portrait may have been intended as a gift for his mistress, Taddea Malaspina, the sister of the marchioness of Massa, to commemorate the birth of their second child, Giulia. Giulia also had an older full brother, Giulio di Alessandro de' Medici, and at least one half-sister, Porzia de' Medici.

After her father's assassination in 1537 and the ensuing power struggle among the Medici for control of Florence and of the family, Giulia and her brother Giulio were taken from their mother and placed under the guardianship of Alessandro's successor, Cosimo I de' Medici. Cosimo promised to treat the children well and their rooms were as opulent as those of his own children. Maria Salviati, the mother of Cosimo I, supervised the nurseries and watched over Giulia's bedside anxiously when the little girl became ill in February 1542. Giulia survived the fever, but her companion in the nursery, Cosimo I's illegitimate daughter Bia de' Medici, died.

As she grew up, Giulia was completely integrated into life at court and was educated to a high standard, as were the daughters and other female wards of Cosimo I. As much attention was paid to Giulia's appearance as to that of Cosimo I's daughters. When she was twelve or thirteen, Cosimo I's wife Eleonora of Toledo was outraged because Giulia's riding cloak did not look right; it was not decorated as she had ordered and it was the wrong length. Courtiers noted that the young Giulia was "the image of her father." Cosimo arranged an advantageous marriage for her with Francesco Cantelmo, the Duke of Popoli, in 1550, when she was about fifteen years old, and provided a dowry for her of an amount that would be worth about eight million United States dollars today.

== Pontormo portrait ==
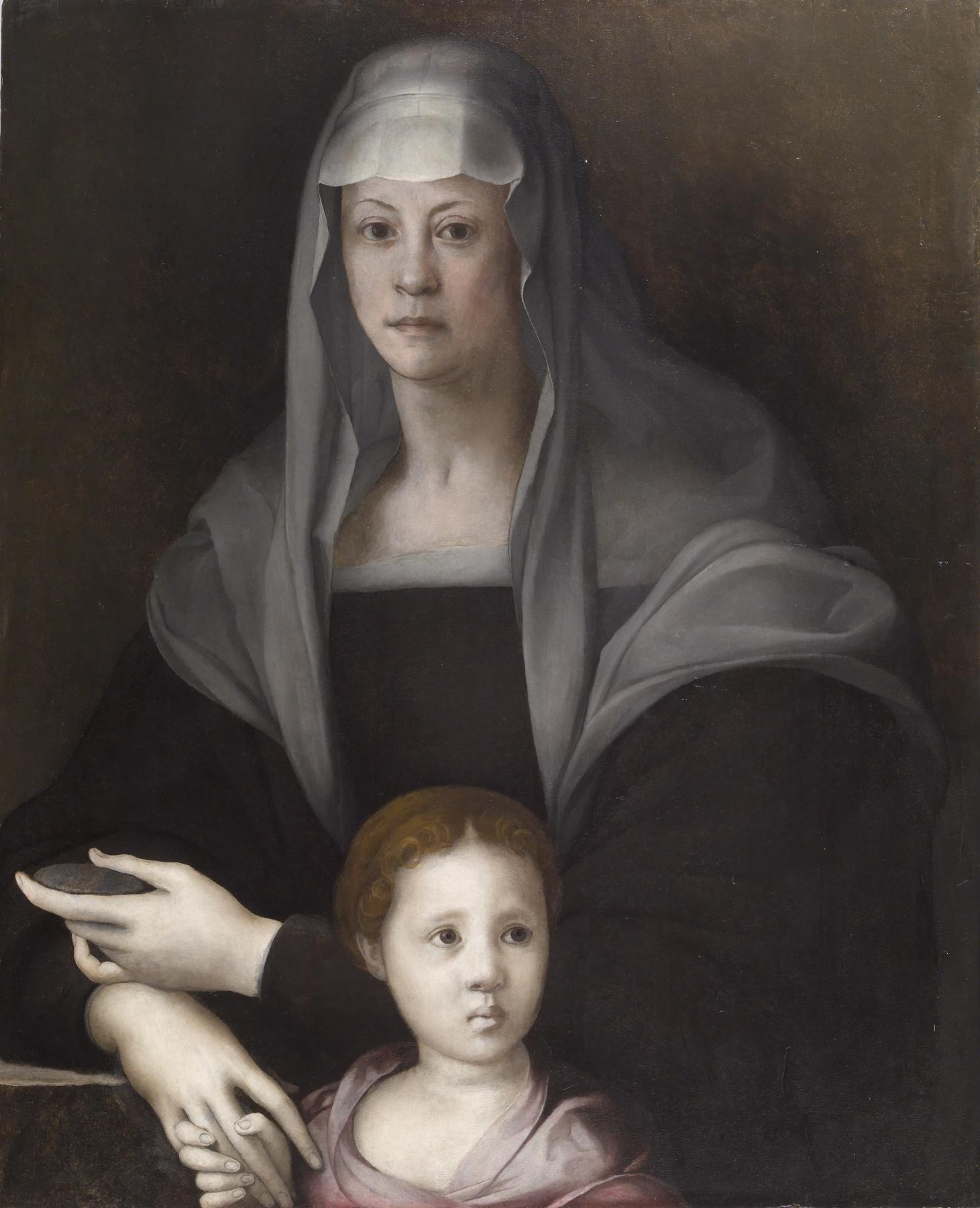
Giulia de' Medici as a child with Maria Salviati in a painting by Pontormo.

Giulia is likely the child depicted in a portrait by Pontormo which shows Maria Salviati with a young child. The child had been painted out of the portrait and her image was not detected until 1937.

Some art historians once identified the child as a young Cosimo I de' Medici, but it is now generally accepted to be Giulia. The child in the portrait appears to be a little girl, rather than a boy, and her expression is anxious. Maria Salviati, who is dressed soberly as befitted a widow, is seen sheltering the vulnerable child against her side. Art historian Gabrielle Langdon argues that the girl's demeanor in the portrait is different than would have been expected for the child Cosimo, whose family anticipated his role as a strong leader from his earliest days. It would have been to Cosimo I's advantage to commission a portrait depicting his mother as an exemplary widow, affectionately bringing up the orphaned daughter of Cosimo I's predecessor. The child's full lips, round nose, and curly reddish hair also bear little resemblance to known portraits of Cosimo as a child, though they do to portraits of the young Alessandro. Other girls of about the right age who were at court during this period also do not resemble the child in the portrait. The portrait might be one of the first in Renaissance-era Europe of a girl of presumed African and European ancestry. This painting is in the permanent collection of The Walters Art Museum in Baltimore, Maryland.

Maike Vogt-Lüerssen argues in an article in Medicea – Rivista interdisciplinare di studi medicei that the child in the portrait with Maria Salviati is actually Salviati's granddaughter Bia de' Medici. She believes that the child does not resemble the known portrait of an adult Giulia de' Medici and that the relationship between Maria Salviati and Giulia was not close enough to have warranted a portrait. Most group portraits were of family members with close blood ties.

== Later life ==
Giulia's paternity was not seen as a disadvantage at court. Her descent from the main Medici line was honored; her father's assassination was compared with the assassination of Julius Caesar by Brutus. Through her aunt Ricciarda Malaspina, Giulia had a distant in-law relationship to Pope Innocent VIII. She displayed great pride in her family lineage and self-assurance. After the death of her first husband, Francesco Cantelmo, in 1555, the artist Alessandro Allori painted a second well-known portrait of Giulia, who was now in her mid-twenties. She was portrayed as a widow. To her left in the portrait is an intricately carved chair. Its sloping arm may represent steep terrain; art historian Gabrielle Langdon said she detected a faint climbing figure there which may represent Hercules. The Choice of Hercules was a popular allegory during the Renaissance about the victory of virtuous action over vice. Mario de Valdes y Cocom, a historian of the African diaspora, argues that the sloping arm of the chair also represents Monte della Verna, which Saint Bonaventure, a Christian scholastic theologian and philosopher, visited and where he was inspired to write his Itinerarium mentis in Deum. Bonaventure visited La Verna because this was the location where Francis of Assisi had a vision of a six-winged seraph and received the stigmata. Mario de Valdes y Cocom writes that Giulia's grandmother Simonetta da Collevecchio, who was possibly of North African descent, married a mule driver from Collevecchio, a site associated with Monte della Verna. Her father Alessandro was insulted by people who called him Alessandro Collevecchio. Historians believe that the artist is alluding to Bonaventure's Neo-Platonic view of God as "the Divine Darkness". Some modern scholars see the painting as Giulia's response to criticism of her grandmother's north African descent and marriage to the mule driver from Collevecchio.

During her widowhood she often stayed at the Augustinian convent of San Clemente on San Gallo, where her sister Porzia was abbess. Giulia is recorded as a patron of this convent as well as other Augustinian convents. A second advantageous marriage was arranged for her soon after with Bernadetto de' Medici, a first cousin of Cosimo I. She married him on August 14, 1559. Their son Alessandro, who was named for her father, was born the following year on December 17, 1560. During the early years of her marriage to Bernadetto, they entertained lavishly and she may have accompanied her husband on diplomatic missions.

Sometime in the 1560s, her relationship with her former guardian may have cooled when Giulia insisted that she be treated as an equal to Cosimo I's mistress, who was regarded with general disdain at court. Other sources indicate that she and her husband were still in good standing with the court when they moved to Naples in 1567. There they battled successfully to win the title and lands to the principality of Ottaviano (see also Princes of Ottajano), which their descendants hold today.
