= Bernadetto de' Medici =

Italian patrician

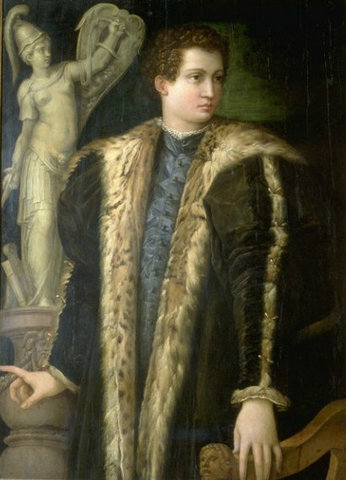
Giorgio Vasari, Bernadetto de' Medici's portrait, Bode Museum.

Bernardetto de' Medici (died Naples, after 1576), 1st Lord of Ottajano, was an Italian patrician who moved from Florence to Naples and established the Ottaiano branch of Medici - one of two Medici branches still extant.

== Biography ==
A member of a cadet branch of the Medici family (the one later called the Princes of Ottajano), he was the son of Ottaviano de' Medici (14 July 1482 - 28 May 1546) and second wife as her second husband (1533) Francesca Salviati (1505 - aft. June 1536). His younger half-brother was Pope Leo XI.

In 1559, he married as her second husband Giulia de' Medici, the illegitimate daughter of Duke Alessandro de' Medici by Taddea Malaspina.

In 1567, he bought the Seigniory of Ottaiano in the Kingdom of Naples from Cesare I Gonzaga and moved there, probably due to strife with Grand Duke Cosimo I. He died in Naples after 1576.

His son Alessandro (died 1606) was Lord of Ottaiano and General of the Papal States. His descendants unsuccessfully claimed the title of Grand Duke of Tuscany after the extinction of the main branch of the Medici family.

== Marriage and descendants ==
Bernardetto married the illegitimate daughter of the Duke Alessandro de 'Medici, Giulia, in 1559. It was her second marriage after the death of her first husband Francesco Cantelmi, Duke of Popoli. They had a son:

- Alessandro de' Medici (1560 - 1606). 2nd Lord of Ottajano, General of the Papal States since April 1605, Governor of Borgo.

Italian nobility
Preceded by new creation	Lord of Ottajano; 1567 – 1576	Succeeded by Alessandro de' Medici
