= Ottaviano de' Medici =

Italian politician

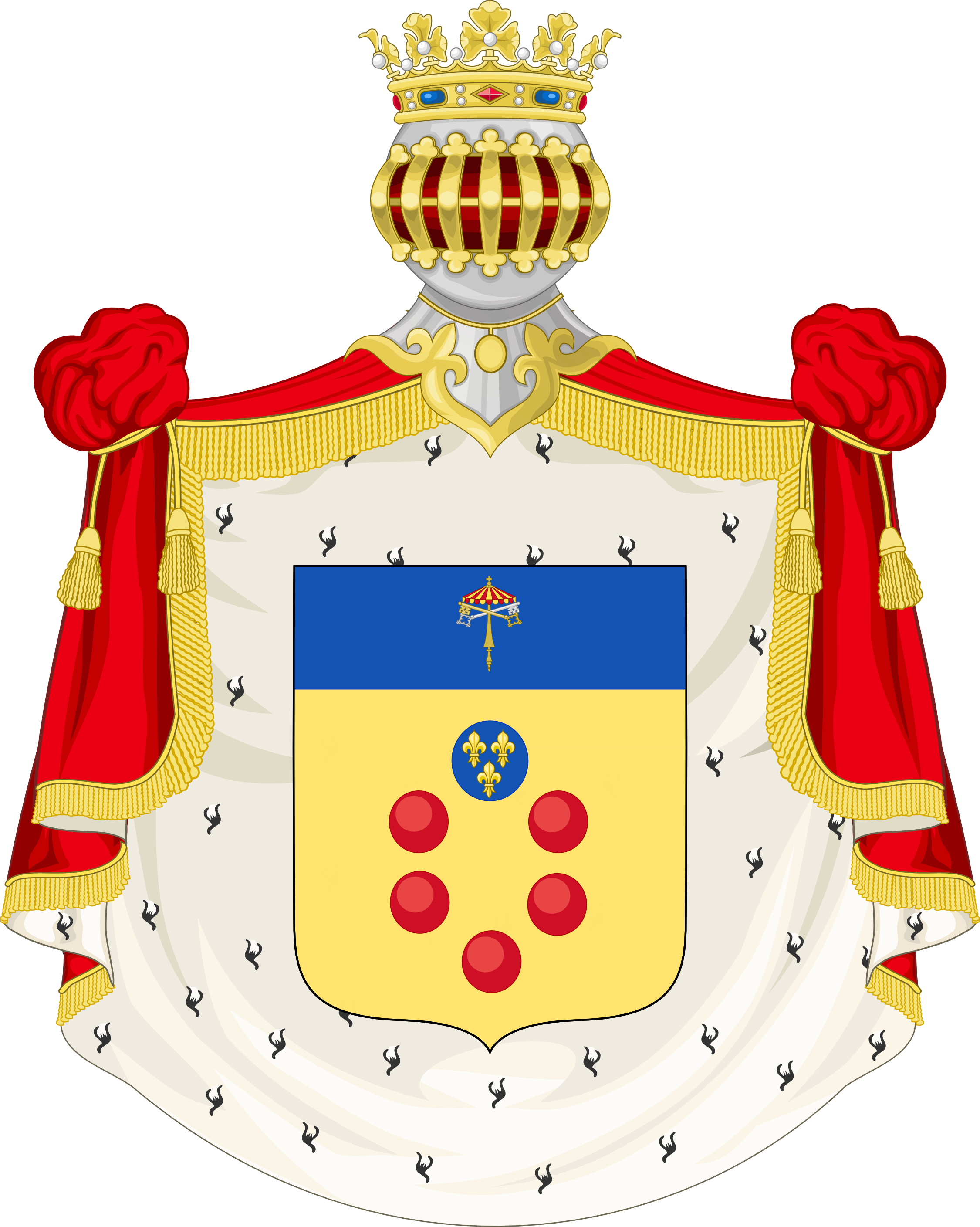
Great coat of arms of Medici of Ottaviano.

Ottaviano de' Medici (14 July 1484 – 28 May 1546) was an Italian politician. He was the ancestor of the Princes of Ottajano line of the Medici family.

== Biography ==
Son of Lorenzo de' Medici and wife Caterina Nerli, he married firstly in 1518 Bartolomea Giugni (Santa Maria del Fiore, Florence, 5 December 1498 - bef. 1533), daughter of Alemanno Giugni and wife, by whom he had two children, Bernadetto de' Medici and Costanza de' Medici (? - 27 March 1606), Governess of Grand Duke Cosimo I de' Medici, married in 1551 to Ugo della Gherardesca (11 December 1530 - 31 December 1589), 1st Count of Donoratico, and had issue.

From a minor branch of the de' Medici family, he gained prominence through his second marriage in 1533 as her second husband to Francesca Salviati (1505 - aft. June 1536), a granddaughter of Lorenzo de' Medici and Ottaviano's own distant cousin. By this marriage he had two sons, Leone de' Medici, who died young, and Alessandro de' Medici.

He held several important positions in Florence, including that of Gonfaloniere di Giustizia, although now a merely formal one after the suppression of the Republic by the Spanish troops in 1530. He was also Senator from 1532. He was trusted by Alessandro de' Medici with administering the family's Tuscan estates.

His son Alessandro was Cardinal and, from 1605, pope as Leo XI. His other son Bernadetto founded the southern Italian line of the family by acquiring the seigniory of Ottaviano, near Naples.
