= Portrait of Maria Salviati =

Painting by Pontormo

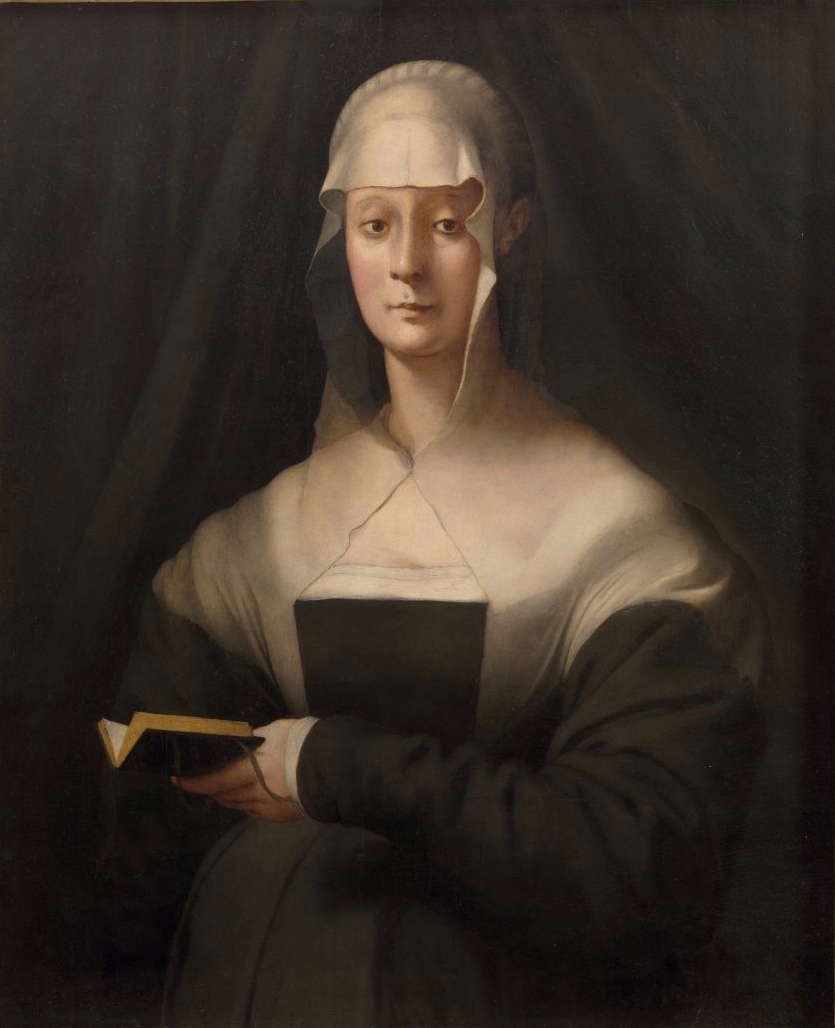
Portrait of Maria Salviati (c. 1543–1544) by Pontormo

Portrait of Maria Salviati is an oil on panel painting attributed to Pontormo, executed c. 1543–1544, in the Uffizi, Florence.

It was acquired by the Uffizi early in the 20th century as a work by Domenico Beccafumi. Soon afterwards Lányi identified it as a portrait of Cosimo I's mother Maria Salviati by Pontormo mentioned in Lives of the Artists by Giorgio Vasari. Gamba found a preparatory drawing in the Uffizi's Gabinetto dei Disegni e delle Stampe (n. 6503F), but argued that the painting was produced by another painter from drawings by Pontormo, whereas he argues that Portrait of Maria Salviati with a Boy (Walters Art Gallery) is in fact the original autograph work.

Noting that the woman in the drawing seems older, in 1956 Luciano Berti argues that the painting on panel may be an idealised produced after its subject's death. Berti later argued against it being an autograph work and instead attributed it to a 16th-century Sienese artist.
