= Alessandro, Prince of Ottajano =

Alessandro de' Medici (1560 – 1606), 2nd Lord of Ottajano, was an Italian patrician, belonging to Neapolitan branch of House of Medici.

== Biography ==
A member of a cadet branch of the Medici family (the one later called the Princes of Ottajano), he was the son of Bernadetto de' Medici and wife and cousin Giulia de' Medici.

He was General of the Papal States since April 1605 and Governor of Borgo

He married Delia Sanseverino of the Counts of Saponara. His son was Don Ottaviano de' Medici, 1st Prince of Ottajano.

Italian nobility
Preceded by Bernadetto de' Medici	Lord of Ottajano; 1576 – 1606	Succeeded by Ottaviano de' Medici
