= Lucrezia de' Medici, Duchess of Ferrara =

Lucrezia de' Medici
- Duchess Ferrara, Modena and Reggio
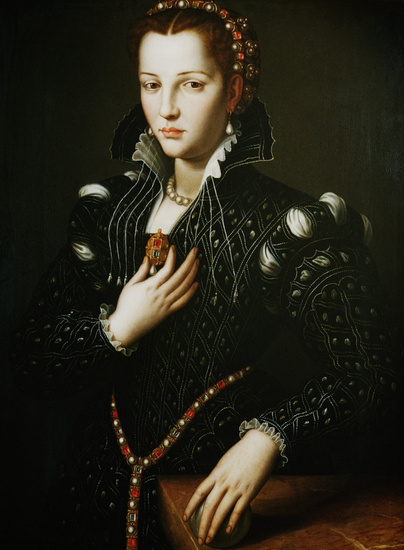
- Portrait attributed to Bronzino or Alessandro Allori, ca. 1560

Duchess consort of Ferrara
- Tenure: 3 October 1559 – 21 April 1561

Duchess consort of Modena and Reggio
- Tenure: 3 October 1559 – 21 April 1561
- Born: 14 February 1545; Florence, Republic of Florence
- Died: 21 April 1561 (aged 16); Ferrara, Duchy of Ferrara
- Burial: Corpus Domini, Ferrara
- Spouse: Alfonso II d'Este, Duke of Ferrara, Modena and Reggio (m. 1558)
- House: Medici (by birth); Este (by marriage)
- Father: Cosimo I de' Medici, Grand Duke of Tuscany
- Mother: Eleanor of Toledo

Lucrezia de' Medici (14 February 1545 – 21 April 1561) was a member of the House of Medici and by marriage Duchess consort of Ferrara, Modena and Reggio from 1558 to 1561.

Married to the intended husband of her elder sister Maria, who died young, her marriage was short and unhappy. The Duchess died of pulmonary tuberculosis, but almost immediately after her death there were rumors that she had been poisoned on the orders of her husband. That suspicion inspired the English poet Robert Browning to create a dramatic monologue in verse "My Last Duchess" (1842).

== Life ==
=== Early years ===
Born in Florence on 14 February 1545, Lucrezia was the fifth child and third daughter of Cosimo I de' Medici, Duke of Florence (and from 1569 Grand Duke of Tuscany), and Eleanor of Toledo. Her paternal grandparents were the famous condottiere Giovanni delle Bande Nere and Maria Salviati (granddaughter of Lorenzo the Magnificent). Her maternal grandparents were Pedro Álvarez de Toledo, Viceroy of Naples, and Maria Osorio, 2nd Marchioness of Villafranca del Bierzo. Lucrezia was named after her great-grandmother Lucrezia de' Medici (1470–1553) (mother of Maria Salviati).

Like all children of the Medici ducal couple, Lucrezia received a good education and was brought up in strict accordance with Spanish court ceremonial, which her mother followed. Only a duenna was permitted to be with the girls of the family in their chambers, and they could not leave without permission. In addition to their father and brothers, only elderly confessors were admitted to them privately.

=== Marriage ===
From childhood, Lucrezia's parents sought suitable marriage candidates for their daughters. From 1549 to 1550, it was planned that Lucrezia would be married to Don Pedro de Aragona y Cardona, 3rd Duke of Montalto. Then in 1552 she was betrothed to Fabio Dal Monte, a nephew of Pope Julius III, but the engagement was canceled after the death of the Pope in 1555.

This marriage was a late consequence of the Italian Wars (1494-1559), a series of conflicts fought between the monarchs of Spain and France over the Italian peninsula; the Spanish emerged victorious and former French allies, like the aristocratic Estes, were forced to make a series of concessions as part of the peace treaties. In 1557, as a sign of reconciliation between Ercole II d'Este, Duke of Ferrara (who held a pro-French position), and King Philip II of Spain, it was decided that Alfonso d'Este, Hereditary Prince of Ferrara, would marry Maria de' Medici, the eldest daughter of Cosimo I, an ally of Spain. However, Maria died shortly thereafter and Lucrezia took her place.

The marriage between a prince from the House of Este and a princess from the House of Medici was opposed by a pro-French party at the groom's court. King Henry II of France's sister, Margaret, and daughter, Elisabeth, were suggested instead to the Ferrarese court as wives for the hereditary Prince. And the ambassadors who arrived in Florence from Ferrara, who had not yet seen Lucrezia, had previously heard rumors deliberately spread around the Ferrara court as to her plain appearance and poor health.

Nevertheless, on 13 April 1558, a marriage contract was signed in Pisa, according to which a dowry of 200,000 gold scudi was given for the bride. On 11 May Alessandro Fiaschi, the chief representative of Ferrara, presented a ring to Lucrezia as a sign of the betrothal. The ambassadors saw her then for the first time and were pleased with the appearance of the princess. She seemed to them a well-mannered and virtuous girl.

Alfonso d'Este solemnly entered Florence on 18 May 1558. On 3 July, 24-year-old Alfonso and 13-year-old Lucrezia were married in the chapel in the Palazzo Pitti (or according to another version in the Basilica of Santa Maria Novella), by the bishop of Cortona, Giovan Battista di Simone Ricasoli. At the request of his mother-in-law, the hereditary Prince of Ferrara agreed to postpone the wedding night until such time as his bride reached sexual maturity.

According to an oral agreement between Alfonso and his father-in-law, which they reached at the conclusion of the marriage contract three days after the wedding, Alfonso left Florence. He went to the French court in Paris, who promised to pay off a sovereign debt to the Duchy of Ferrara of 300,000 ducats. Lucrezia, despite the invitation of her father-in-law to move to Ferrara, remained in Florence at the request of her mother, to wait for her husband to come for her. (Note: In part, the decision of Duchess Eleanor to keep her daughter with her was provoked by the attitude of her son-in-law towards the members of the Medici family. The hereditary Prince of Ferrara had married on the orders of his father and was demonstratively arrogant and cold when dealing with his young bride and her relatives.)

Together with her sister Isabella, the new hereditary Princess of Ferrara continued to live in the chambers of the Palazzo Pitti, isolated from the rest of the world. Lucrezia's numerous letters to her husband often went unanswered. While waiting for Alfonso to come to her, she ate almost nothing and spoke little, and every day she prayed for him for a long time at the morning service. The hereditary Princess desperately wanted to leave her strict maternal care and start an independent life.

After some time, Duke Cosimo I expressed dissatisfaction to his son-in-law at the manner in which he was delaying his return to collect his wife. Only after the death of Duke Ercole II on 3 October 1559, when Alfonso became Duke of Ferrara, Modena and Reggio under the name of Alfonso II, and his spouse became, accordingly, Duchess consort, did he leave France and come to retrieve her. On 17 February 1560, Lucrezia moved out of the Medici court in Florence and entered Ferrara. (Note: At first, Alfonso II had sent a retinue to fetch Lucrezia from Florence. But when his mother-in-law demanded that he come and personally take his wife from the parental home, the Duke of Ferrara had to obey. He himself led the wedding procession and, accompanied by Lucrezia's brother, Cardinal Giovanni, arrived in Florence to fetch her.)

=== Circumstances of death ===
Once in Ferrara, the already frail Duchess spent almost all her time in her rooms. Less than a year after her arrival, on 21 April 1561, she died, after suffering a month of fever, severe weight loss, constant coughing and a permanently bleeding nose. According to Dr. Andrea Pascvali, sent from Florence to the Duchess by her father, Alfonso was concerned about Lucrezia's state of health during the entire period of her illness. An autopsy by the same doctor revealed that the Duchess had died of "putrid fever"; modern historians believe that her death was caused by pulmonary tuberculosis. Despite this, after her death, there were rumors that she had been poisoned.

Lucrezia was buried in the Corpus Domini Monastery, the ancestral mausoleum of the House of Este in Ferrara. Her marriage to Alfonso II was childless, and the widowed Duke married twice more: in 1565 to the Archduchess Barbara of Austria and in 1579 to Margherita Gonzaga. Neither marriage produced children. With the death of Alfonso II, the Duchy of Ferrara became part of the Papal States, and the Duchies of Modena and Reggio passed to his nephew Cesare d'Este, a descendant of the d'Este family through an illegitimate line.

== In culture ==
A portrait of Lucrezia has survived, now kept in the North Carolina Museum of Art in the city of Raleigh, North Carolina. According to some experts, it was the work of Bronzino; according to others, it was painted by Bronzino's nephew Alessandro Allori. A copy of this painting is kept in the Palazzo Pitti. Other portraits of Lucrezia are in the collections of the Uffizi Gallery and the Ambras Castle; the half-length image in the Uffizi has been attributed to Alessandro Allori.

There are several medals depicting the Duchess of Ferrara: three works by Pastorino dei Pastorini and one by Domenico Poggini. All of them were made to commemorate the wedding of Lucrezia and Alfonso II.

Shocked at the death of the young Duchess, Bronzino dedicated a posthumous sonnet to her. Lucrezia is also the heroine of the dramatic monologue in verse, "My Last Duchess" by Robert Browning, first published under the title "Italy" in 1842, and under the more well-known title in 1845. Inspired by Browning's poem, her marriage to Alfonso is the subject of Gabrielle Kimm's 2010 novel His Last Duchess. She is also the subject of the 2022 novel The Marriage Portrait by award-winning author Maggie O'Farrell.

== Ancestry ==
Ancestors of Lucrezia de' Medici, Duchess of Ferrara

8. Giovanni il Popolano
4. Giovanni delle Bande Nere
9. Caterina Sforza
2. Cosimo I de' Medici, Grand Duke of Tuscany
10. Jacopo Salviati
5. Maria Salviati
11. Lucrezia de' Medici
1. Lucrezia de' Medici
12. Fadrique Álvarez de Toledo y Enríquez, 2nd Duke of Alba
6. Pedro de Toledo y Zúñiga
13. Isabel de Zúñiga y Pimentel
3. Eleanor of Toledo
14. Luis Pimentel y Pacheco, 1st Marquis of Villafranca del Bierzo
7. María Osorio y Pimentel, 2nd Marquise of Villafranca del Bierzo
15. Juana Osorio y Bazán, 1st Marquise of Villafranca del Bierzo

== Bibliography ==
- Murphy, Caroline P. (2008). Murder of a Medici Princess. Oxford: Oxford University Press. ISBN 978-0-19-531439-7.
- Anguillesi, Giovanni (1815). Notizie storiche dei palazzi e ville appartenenti alla r. corona di Toscana. Pisa: Niccolo Capurro.
- Browning, R; Woolford, J.; Karlin, D. (1991). The Poems of Browning: 1841 — 1846. London: Longman. ISBN 978-0-58-206399-0.
- Langdon, G. (2006). Medici Women: Portraits of Power, Love and Betrayal from the Court of Duke Cosimo I. Toronto: University of Toronto Press. ISBN 978-0-80-203825-8.

Lucrezia de' Medici, Duchess of Ferrara House of Medici Born: 14 February 1545 Died: 21 April 1561
Royal titles
Preceded by Renée of France	Duchess consort of Ferrara, Modena, and Reggio; 3 October 1559 – 21 April 1561	Vacant Title next held by Barbara of Austria
