= Giulio de' Medici =

Giulio de' Medici may refer to:

- Pope Clement VII, Giulio di Giuliano de' Medici, (1478–1534)
- Giulio di Alessandro de' Medici (c. 1533–1600), illegitimate son of the last ruler of Florence from the "senior" branch of the Medici, Alessandro de' Medici
