= Maria de' Medici (1540–1557) =

Tuscan noble lady

Possibly Maria de’ Medici with her younger brother Antonio in a posthumous portrait by Agnolo Bronzino.

Maria de' Medici (April 3, 1540 – November 19, 1557) was the eldest child of Cosimo I de' Medici, Grand Duke of Tuscany and Eleonora di Toledo. She was a member of the famous Medici family.

== Life ==
She was engaged to Alfonso II, Duke of Ferrara, but died at the age of seventeen, before the marriage could take place. She was educated with her brothers and was among the brightest of the children. When her brother Francesco didn't understand his Greek lesson, his tutors called on Maria to explain it to him. Maria kept herself somewhat aloof from her younger brothers and sisters. She grew into an elegant, highly educated, and decorous young woman.

According to one unreliable legend, recounted in Edgcumbe Staley's The Tragedies of the Medici, Maria was lovely and kept closely guarded from men, but managed to meet a young lover, Malatesta de' Malatesti, in secret. According to the story, she was stabbed in the heart by her father after he caught the young lovers together. Cosimo then supposedly put out the story that she had died of a spotted fever and threw her young lover in prison.

Other more accurate accounts indicate that Maria's cause of death was probably malaria. She died in Livorno. Her father mourned for her deeply and kept her portrait in his bedroom until he died; he had now lost two of his daughters, Bia de' Medici—an illegitimate child born before Cosimo's marriage to Eleonora—being the other daughter. "She was of the same disposition as myself," said Cosimo, "and she was deprived of fresh air." Her sister Lucrezia di Cosimo de Medici later married Alfonso.

== Portraits ==
Maike Vogt-Lüerssen argued in an article in Medicea – Rivista interdisciplinare di studi medicei that portraits of Maria have been misidentified by art historians during the past 500 years. She argued that a portrait by Bronzino that is usually identified as Maria depicts her younger half-sister Virginia de' Medici, while a Bronzino portrait of a young girl in a white dress depicts Maria rather than her older half-sister, Bia de' Medici. Vogt-Lüerssen also argued that a Bronzino portrait identified as an unknown noblewoman and her son is of a teenaged Maria and her younger brother, Antonio, both of whom died young. She identified the girl as Maria because of the similarity in facial features between the subjects of each of the latter two portraits.

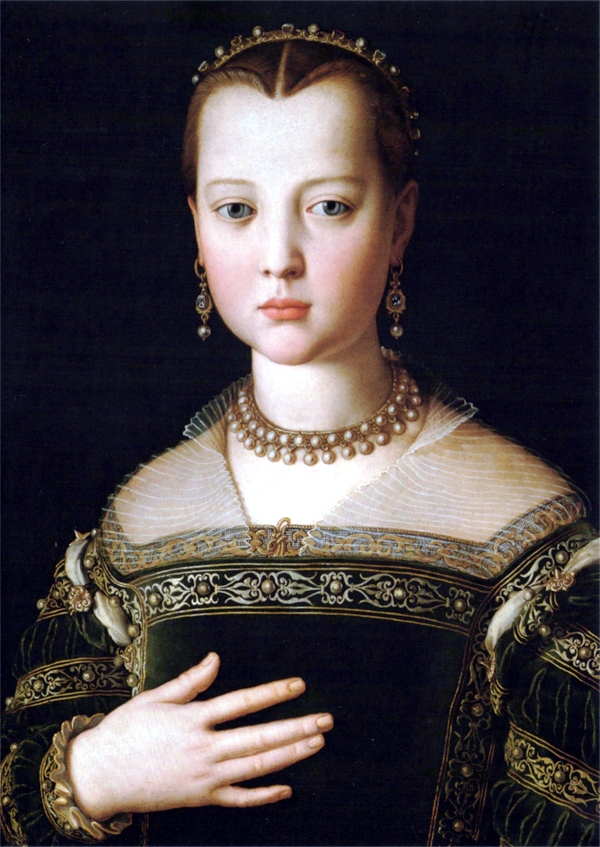
A portrait usually identified as Maria de' Medici, daughter of Cosimo I de' Medici, Grand Duke of Tuscany, who died at the age of seventeen. She was painted by Bronzino when she was eleven. One critic proposed that the portrait is of Maria's younger half-sister Virginia de' Medici.

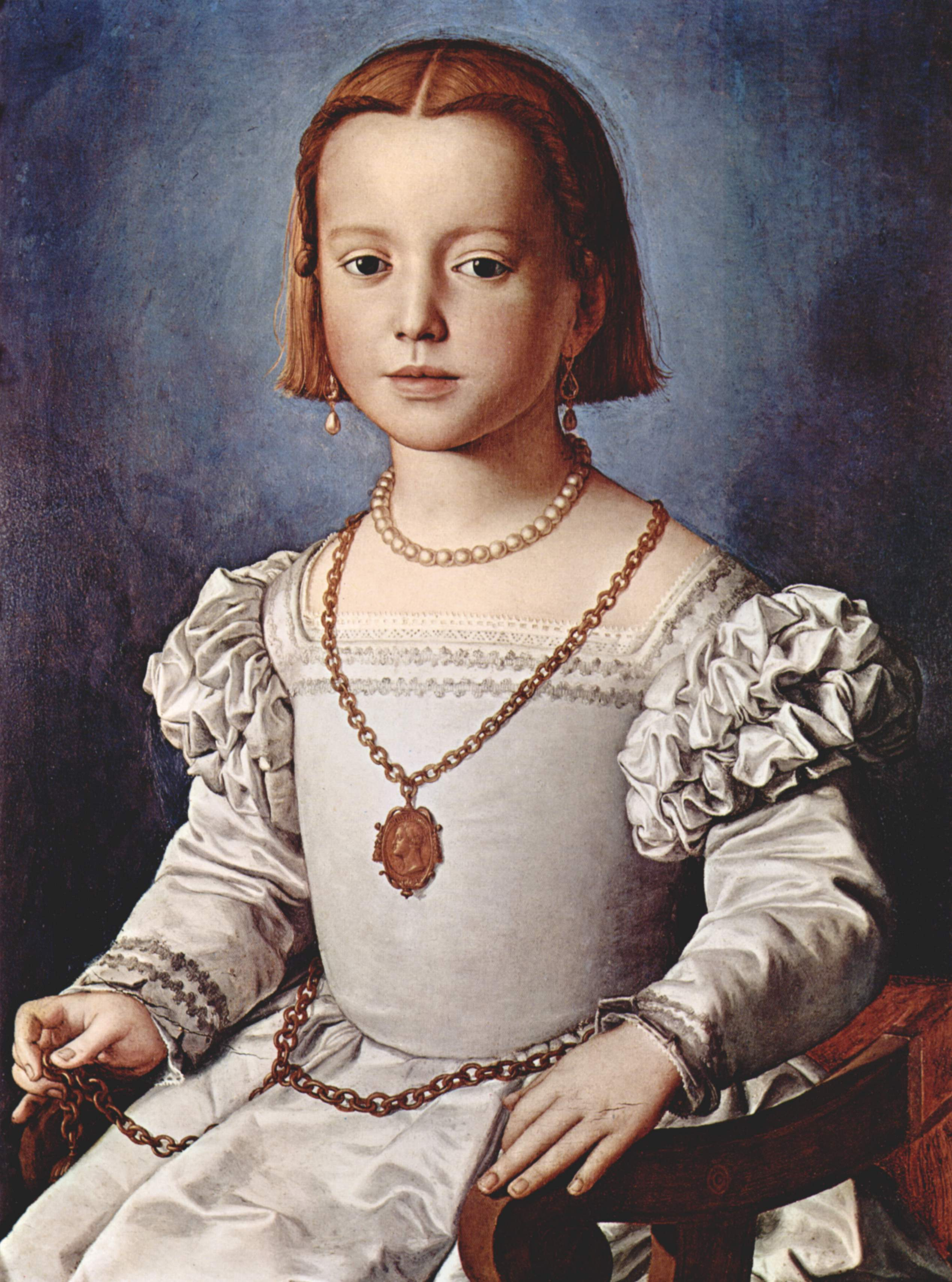
This portrait by Bronzino was identified as Maria de' Medici, painted in January 1551 when she was ten years old, until the 1950s.

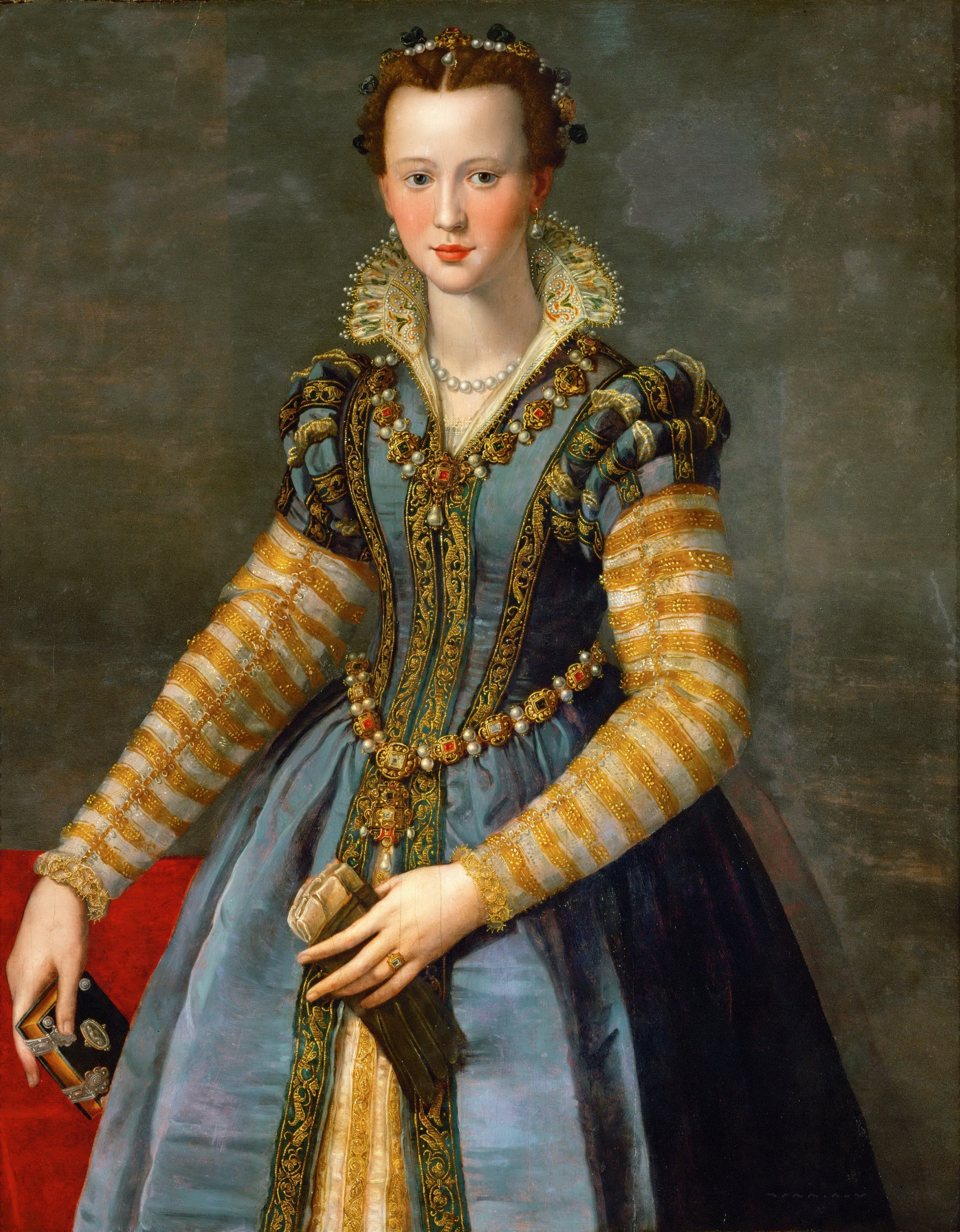
A portrait of a young woman by Alessandro Allori that is sometimes identified as either Maria de’ Medici or her cousin, Eleonora di Garzia di Toledo.

== Ancestry ==
Ancestors of Maria de' Medici (1540–1557)

16. Pierfrancesco di Lorenzo de' Medici
8. Giovanni di Pierfrancesco de' Medici
17. Laudomia Acciaiuoli
4. Ludovico di Giovanni de' Medici
18. Galeazzo Maria Sforza
9. Caterina Sforza
19. Lucrezia Landriani
2. Cosimo I de' Medici, Grand Duke of Tuscany
20. Giovanni Salviati
10. Jacopo Salviati
21. Maddalena Gondi
5. Maria Salviati
22. Lorenzo de' Medici
11. Lucrezia de' Medici
23. Clarice Orsini
1. Maria de' Medici
24. García Álvarez de Toledo y Carrillo
12. Fadrique Álvarez de Toledo y Enríquez de Guzmán
25. María Enríquez de Toledo y Guzmán
6. Pedro Álvarez de Toledo y Zúñiga
26. Álvaro de Zúñiga y Guzmán (pt)
13. Isabel de Zúñiga y Pimentel
27. Leonor Pimentel y Zúñiga
3. Eleanor of Toledo
28. Rodrigo Pimentel y Quiñones
14. Luis Pimentel y Pacheco
29. María Luisa Pacheco y Portocarrero
7. María Osorio y Pimentel
30. Pedro Osorio y Fernández
15. Juana Osorio y Bazán
31. María Bazán y Quiñones
