= Ottaviano de' Medici, 1st Prince of Ottajano =

Don Ottaviano de' Medici (1604 – 1629), 3rd Lord and 1st Prince of Ottajano, was an Italian patrician, belonging to Napolitan branch of House of Medici. He was the first to hold the title of Prince of Ottajano.

== Biography ==
A member of a cadet branch of the Medici family (the one later called the Princes of Ottajano), he was the son of Alessandro de' Medici and his wife Delia San Severino.

== Marriage and issue ==
He married Donna Diana Caracciolo of the Princes of Santo Buono and Dukes of Feroleto. They had:

- Donna Francesca de' Medici; married Prince Filippo II Caetani (1620-1687)
- Don Giuseppe de' Medici, 2nd Prince of Ottajano. He was the first to hold the title of Duke of Sarno.
- Don Domenico de' Medici

Italian nobility
Preceded by Alessandro de' Medici	Prince of Ottajano; 1606 – 1629	Succeeded by Giuseppe de' Medici
