= Portrait of Bia de' Medici =

Painting by Bronzino

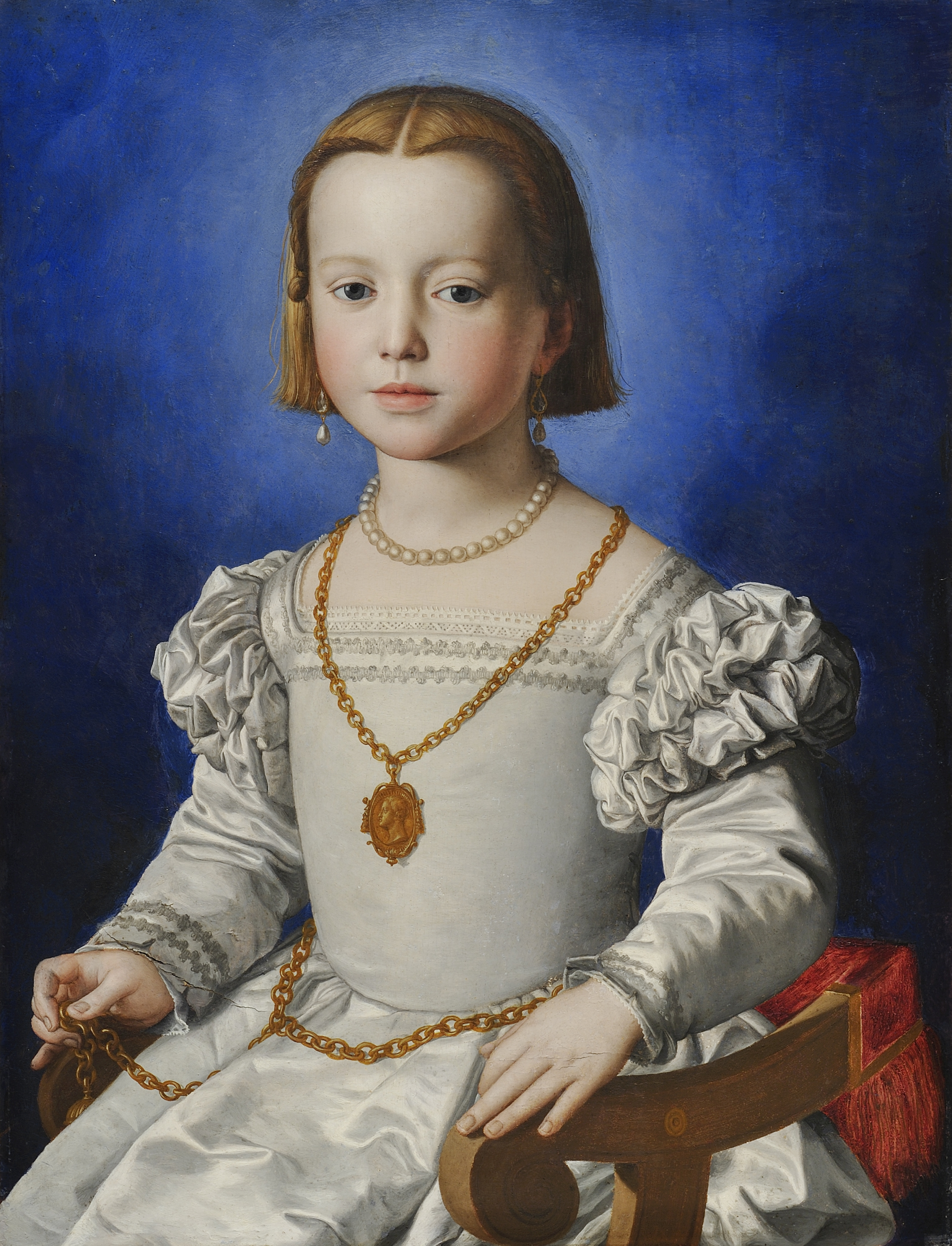
- Artist: Agnolo Bronzino
- Year: c. 1542
- Medium: Tempera on wood
- Dimensions: 64 cm × 48 cm (25 in × 19 in)
- Location: Uffizi, Florence

The Portrait of Bia de' Medici is a tempera on wood painting by the Italian Mannerist painter Agnolo Bronzino, dating to around 1542 and now in the Uffizi in Florence. For a long time it was displayed in the Tribuna at the heart of the museum, but since 2012 it has been moved to the "sale rosse" of the Nuovi Uffizi. A second portrait, by Pontormo, has also been argued to show Bia de' Medici, but this identification is disputed.

== Description ==
After her death, many art historians believe her father commissioned a posthumous painting of his illegitimate daughter by Agnolo Bronzino, which often is regarded as one of his finest works. The work is 64 by 48 cm (25 by 19 in) and was painted in tempera on wood. The painting is on display in the Galleria degli Uffizi in Florence.

Bronzino shows the child half-length and sitting on a chair, similar to the pose in his Portrait of Lucrezia Panciatichi – a rigid official pose offset by some hints of hand movement, as if the character was about to get up, along with an intense but emotionless gaze straight at the viewer. The face is lit and highlighted by the blue background, whilst the cold light and absence of any strong chiaroscuro effect accentuates the smoothness of the subject's complexion and idealises her features.

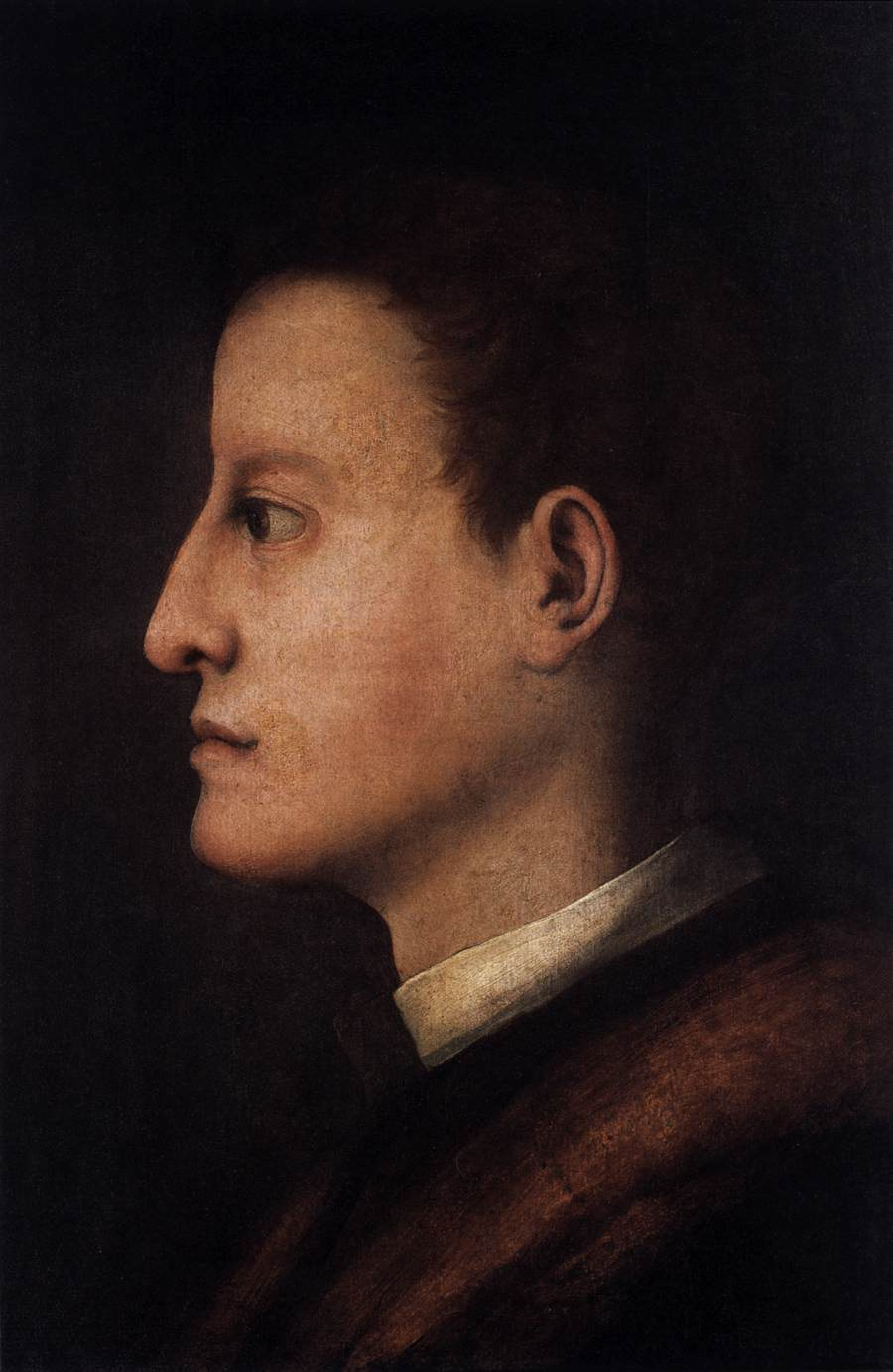
Portrait of Cosimo de Medici by Pontormo (1537)

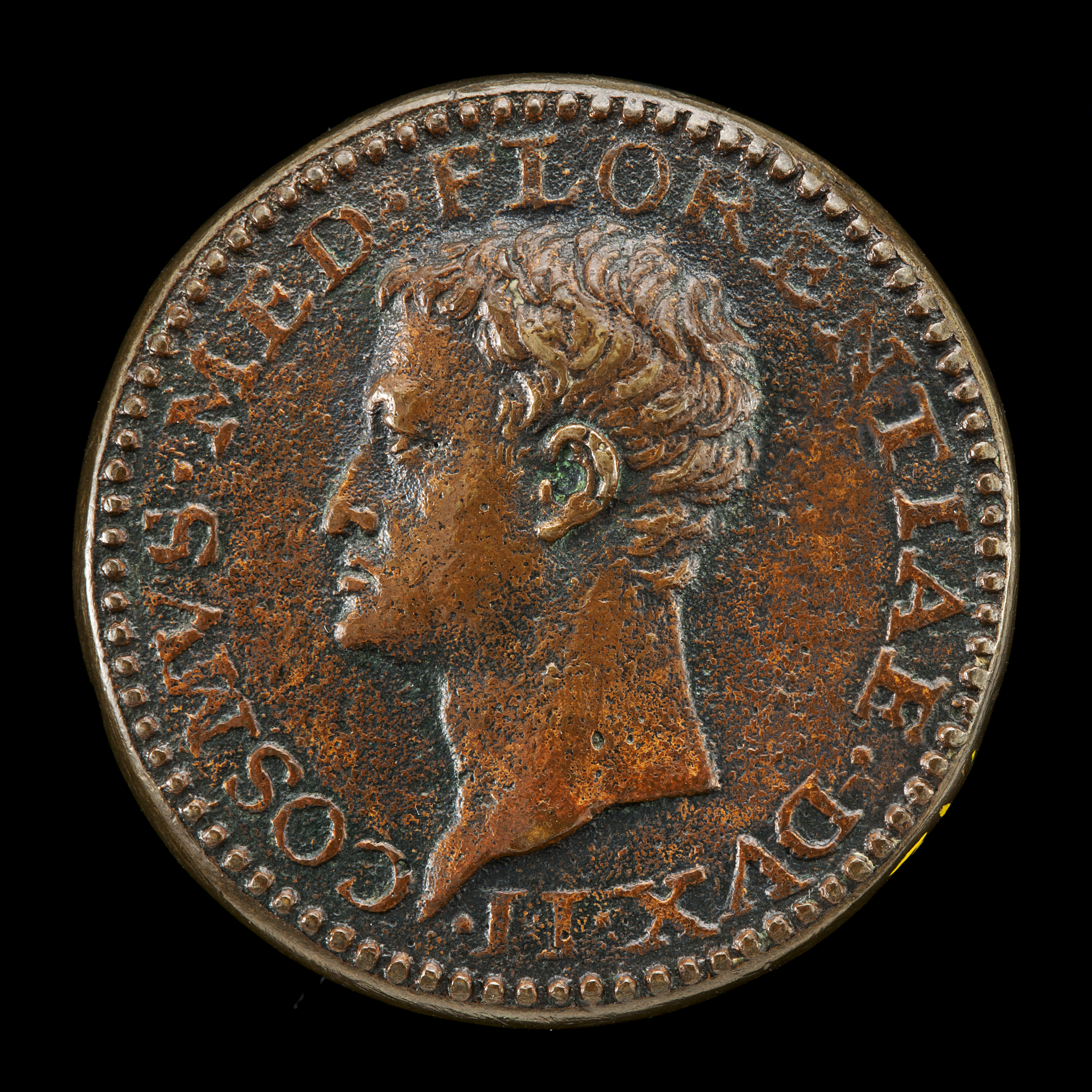
Domenico di Polo di Angelo de' Vetri (1537)

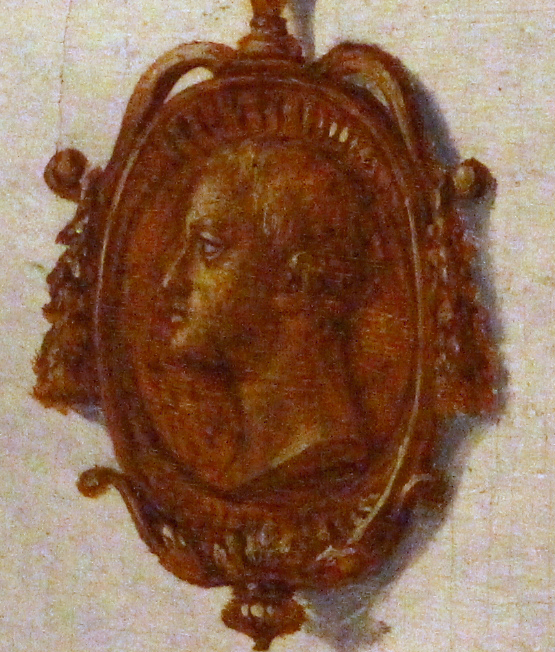
Detail of the medallion portrait from the portrait of Bia de Medici

Bia has her hair parted in the middle of her forehead and a falling bob, with two carefully tied braids framing the face. She wears pearl earrings, a gold chain with a pendant or medallion with her father's profile on it, emphasizing her bond with her father. The medallions portrait of her father is modeled after a portrait of Cosimo by Pontormo and then made into a medallion by Domenico di Poli. The appearance of the medallion in the portrait helped to identify the subject as a daughter of Cosimo.

She also wears a sumptuous dress, made of blue satin with puffy sleeves, produced in the silk factories Cosimo was setting up in Florence at the time. With her right hand she is fiddling with the end or tassel of a golden chain or belt around her waist.

The portrait would have hung in the family's private rooms as a reminder to them of the dead child and an inspiration and guide on the path to salvation. As art historian Gabrielle Langdon argues, Bronzino painted the child with a halo effect, in "light-emitting white satin and pearls" as a metaphor for both her purported name "Bianca," which means "white" and her childish innocence. "Like (Petrarch's) 'Laura,' the posthumous Bia is a riveting emanation from Heaven who bestows purifying grace on the beholder," Langdon wrote in the 2004 collection The Cultural World of Eleanora Di Toledo.

== Identification ==
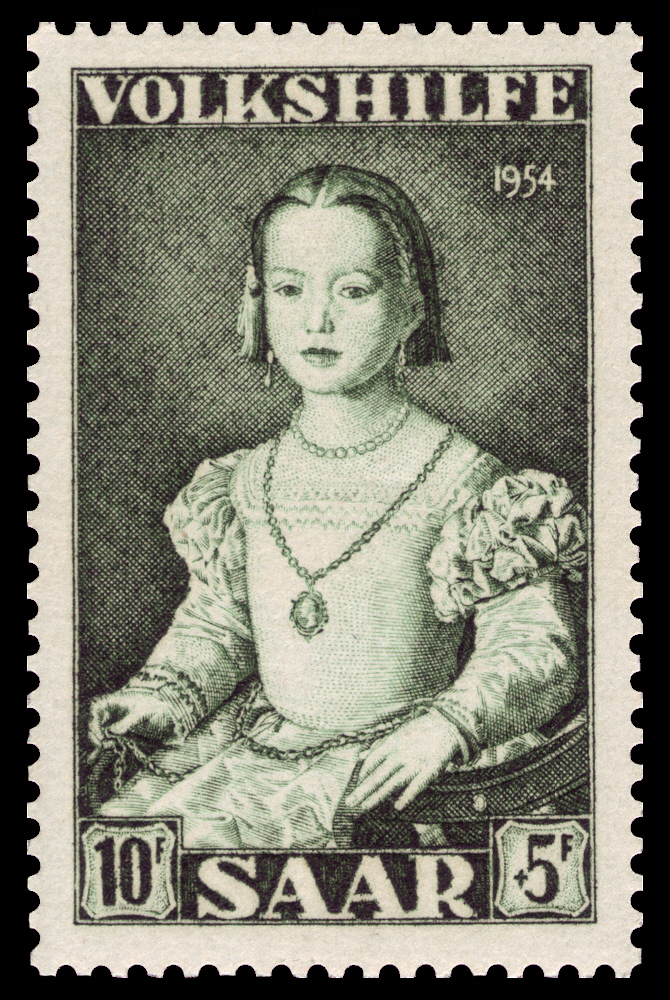
A 1954 Saarland stamp of the Bia de' Medici portrait, commemorating the work of Agnolo Bronzino.

Until 1893 it was thought to represent Maria de' Medici, the younger legitimate sister of Bia and that the name "Bia" was a contraction or nickname of Maria. This was until the Italian painter, restorer and art historian Cosimo Conti found archival evidence for the existence for a daughter of Cosimos by the name of Bia.

Some other researchers like Maike Vogt-Lüerssen however argues the viewpoint held previously that the portrait actually depicts Bia's younger, legitimate half sister, Maria de' Medici. Vogt-Lüerssen says in an article in Medicea – Rivista interdisciplinare di studi medicei that the subject of the portrait was identified as Maria until the 1950s and the pearls depicted in the portrait were a common symbol of the Medicis, often worn by legitimate female members of the house. Such pearl necklaces were a common fashionable accessory for women of the Italian nobility.

Vogt-Lüerssen believes that the child depicted in a famous portrait by Pontormo with Maria Salviati is actually Bia, her eldest granddaughter, because group portraits in that era depicted family members with close blood relationships and Salviati's two younger granddaughters, Maria and Isabella, were too young at Salviati's death to be the 5- or 6-year-old girl in the portrait.

Other equally credible identifications for the child in the Pontormo painting have also been put forth, such as Giulia de' Medici, the daughter of Cosimo de Medicis predecessor. After her father Alessandro de' Medici's assassination, his daughter was put in the care of Maria Salviati.

== Influence ==
Regardless of which Medici daughter it depicts, the painting has continued to inspire modern artists. American sculptor Joseph Cornell's 1948 sculpture Medici Princess incorporates Bronzino's portrait of the girl. The sculpture, one of a series depicting members of the Medici family, shows an enameled reproduction of Bronzino's portrait in a dark wooden box, behind a blurred, deep blue glass pane. On either side of the main portrait are smaller vignette reproductions of the same portrait, behind glass as well. Below the girl's image, in a pull-out drawer, are a feather and a floor plan of the palace in Florence that was once her home. The sculpture, which is owned by a private collector, was on display during a recent retrospective of Cornell's work originating with the Smithsonian American Art Museum.

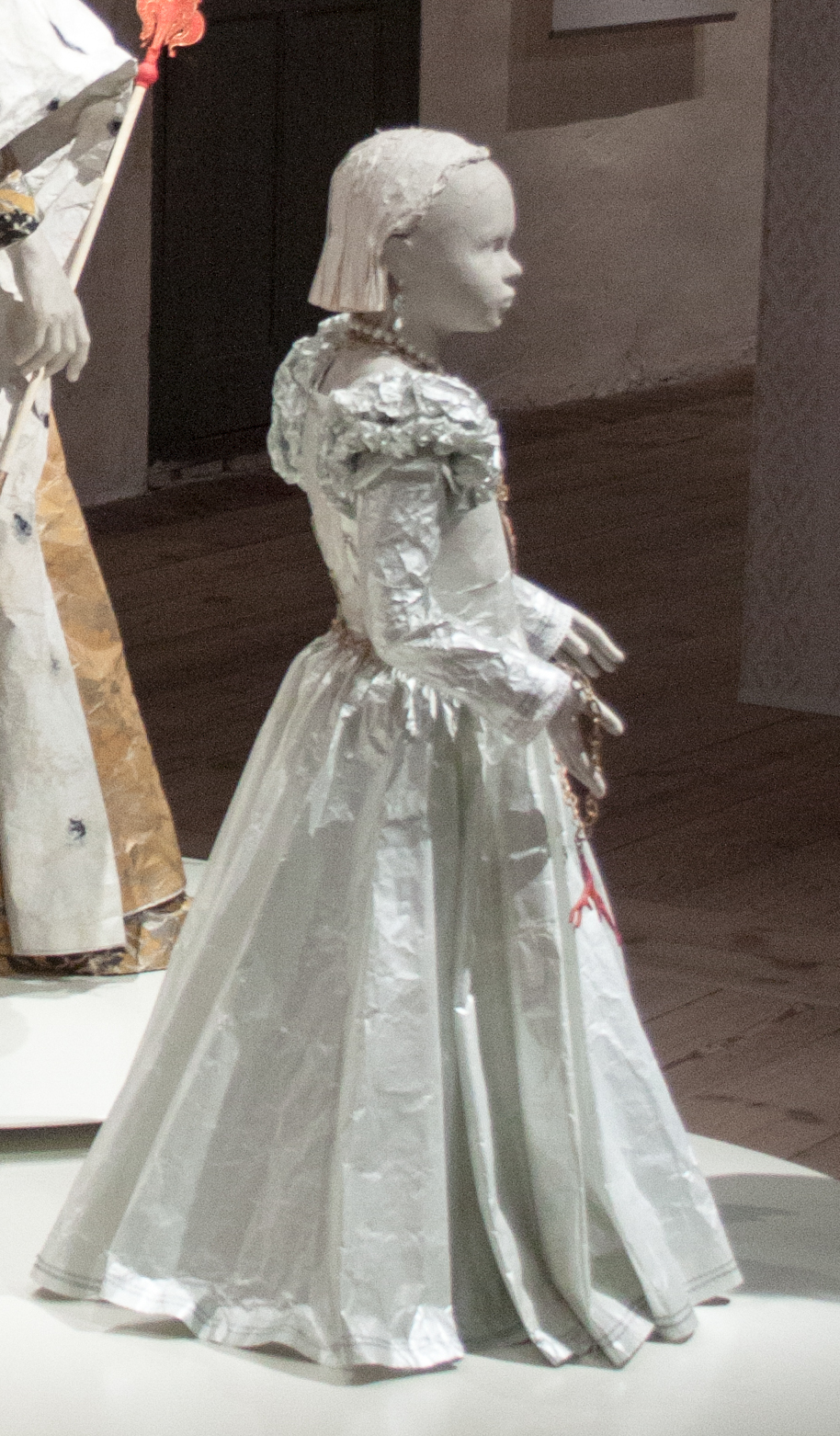
Bia de Medici (2006) Isabelle de Borchgrave exhibition in Kalmar Castle, 2017

Isabella de Borchgrave recreated Bia de Medici in paper.

The portrait of Bia has also been recreated (wearing a scuba diving mask) by the street artist Blub in Lerici and Ravenna.

== Bia de' Medici ==
Bia de' Medici, (c. 1536 – 1 March 1542) was the illegitimate daughter of Cosimo I de' Medici, Grand Duke of Tuscany, born before his first marriage.

The identity of Bia's mother is not known, but Cosimo I was likely no older than sixteen when he fathered her. According to Edgcumbe Staley's The Tragedies of the Medici, some stories said the girl's mother was a village girl from Trebbio, where the Medicis had built one of their first villas, while others said she was a gentlewoman from Florence. Only Cosimo I and the girl's paternal grandmother, Maria Salviati, knew the identity of the girl's mother, but Salviati refused to reveal it, though she did acknowledge Bia was the daughter of Cosimo.

Staley wrote that the little girl was called La Bia, short for Bambina (little girl or baby). The name might also have been short for Bianca or perhaps a classical name, deriving from Pallas' daughter. Staley wrote that her father's new wife, Eleonora di Toledo, refused to tolerate her presence in the palace after their marriage, so Cosimo sent her off to the Villa di Castello, her paternal grandmother's chief residence north of Florence. However, other more reliable reports indicate that her stepmother "brought her up very lovingly." Her paternal grandmother supervised the nurseries for all of the children of Cosimo I. All of them, not only Cosimo's illegitimate daughter, spent most of their time at the Villa di Castello and were raised by nurses, with minimal day-to-day contact with their parents, though both Cosimo and Eleonora heard reports of their progress and offered directions for their education, their living arrangements, and the clothing they wore. Bia shared her nursery with Giulia de' Medici, the illegitimate daughter of Alessandro de' Medici, Duke of Florence, who was close to her in age. She grew into a high-spirited, loving little girl who kept her grandmother and nurses entertained with her antics. Bia's father adored his first-born child, and her paternal grandmother, Maria Salviati, said the little girl "was the comfort of our court, being so very affectionate."

Both Bia and her cousin Giulia contracted a fast-moving fever in February 1542, from which Giulia recovered but Bia did not. Cosimo I received almost daily reports of Bia's worsening condition from his mother, Maria Salviati. The child grew weaker between 25 February and 28 February and finally died on 1 March 1542. She was buried in the Medici family crypt in San Lorenzo.

When her legitimate half-sister Isabella de' Medici was born six months after her death, her father rejoiced to have another daughter. Contemporaries who might normally have consoled him on his wife's failure to present him with a second son instead congratulated him on her birth, knowing how he had grieved for the loss of Bia. "(I) congratulate you on the beautiful baby girl God has conceded to you in recompense for the one he has taken to join him in paradise," wrote Paolo Giovio after the birth of Isabella. A comparison of portraits of Bia and Isabella reveal that, had she lived past early childhood, Bia likely would have closely resembled her half-sister Isabella, who shared her reddish-blonde hair, brown eyes, and dainty features.

== Pontormo painting ==
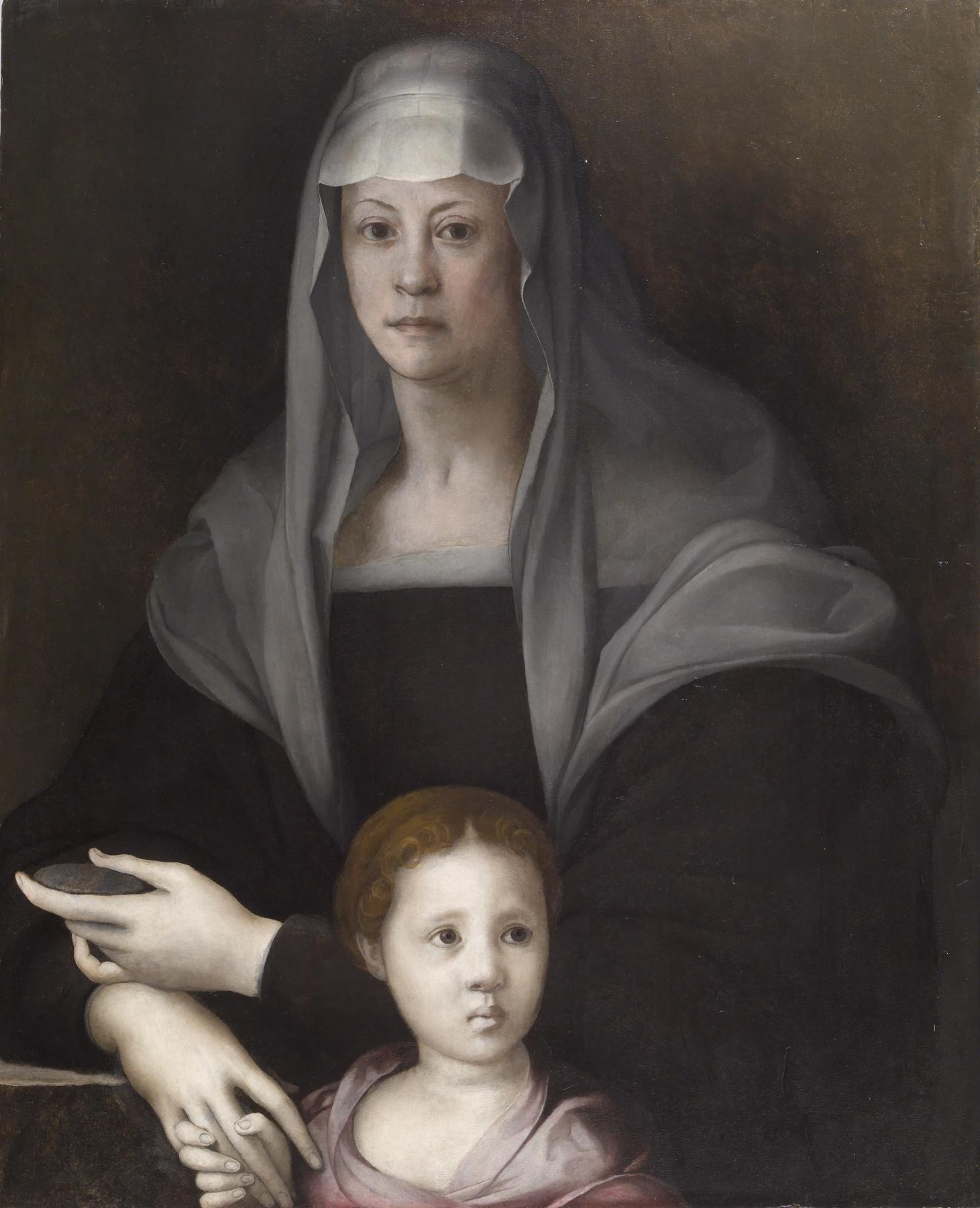
Maria Salviati with Giulia de' Medici or Bia de' Medici in a portrait by Pontormo, c. 1537 or 1542; Oil on panel, Baltimore, The Walters Art Museum.

In a portrait by Pontormo, the child's identification, according to the Walters Art Museum and scholarship sponsored by the National Endowment for the Humanities is likely to be Giulia de' Medici. However, Maike Vogt-Lüerssen argues in an article in Medicea – Rivista interdisciplinare di studi medicei that the child in the portrait with Maria Salviati is actually Salviati's granddaughter Bia de' Medici. She believes that the child does not resemble the known portrait of an adult Giulia de' Medici and that the relationship between Maria Salviati and Giulia was not close enough to have warranted a portrait. Most group portraits were of family members with close blood ties.

Some art historians once identified the child as a young Cosimo I de' Medici, but it is now generally accepted to be Giulia. The child in the portrait appears to be a little girl, rather than a boy, and her expression is anxious. Maria Salviati, who is dressed soberly as befitted a widow, is seen sheltering the vulnerable child against her side. Art historian Gabrielle Langdon argues that the girl's demeanor in the portrait is different than would have been expected for the child Cosimo, whose family anticipated his role as a strong leader from his earliest days. It would have been to Cosimo I's advantage to commission a portrait depicting his mother as an exemplary widow, affectionately bringing up the orphaned daughter of Cosimo I's predecessor. The child's full lips, round nose, and curly reddish hair also bear little resemblance to known portraits of Cosimo as a child, though they do to portraits of the young Alessandro. Other girls of about the right age who were at court during this period also do not resemble the child in the portrait. The portrait might be one of the first in Renaissance-era Europe of a girl of presumed African and European ancestry. This painting is in the permanent collection of The Walters Art Museum in Baltimore, Maryland.

The portrait has also been identified with other women, such as Isabella or Maria.

== Bibliography ==
- AA.VV., Galleria degli Uffizi, collana I Grandi Musei del Mondo, Roma 2003.
- Langdon, Gabrielle (2006). Medici Women: Portraits of Power, Love, and Betrayal. University of Toronto Press. ISBN 0-8020-3825-5
- Eisenbichler, Konrad (2004). The Cultural World of Eleanora Di Toledo. Ashgate Publishing, Inc. ISBN 0-7546-3774-3
- Murphy, Caroline P. (2008). Murder of a Medici Princess. USA: Oxford University Press. ISBN 0-19-531439-5
- Staley, Edgcumbe. The Tragedies of the Medici.
- Vogt-Lüerssen, Maike. The True Faces of the Daughters and Sons of Cosimo I de' Medici
- Schultes, Lothar (2017). Der Tod und das Mädchen – Bia oder Maria de' Medici? In: Mitteilungen der Gesellschaft für vergleichende Kunstforschung in Wien, 69, Nr. 1/2, Febr. 2017, 1–6.
