= Giuseppe de' Medici, 2nd Prince of Ottajano =

Giuseppe de' Medici (1635–1717) was an Italian patrician, belonging to Napolitan branch of House of Medici. He was the first to hold the title of Duke of Sarno.

== Early life ==
A member of a cadet branch of the Medici family, called the Princes of Ottajano, he was the son of Ottaviano de' Medici, 1st Prince of Ottajano and his wife, Donna Diana Caracciolo.

== Marriage and issue ==
In 1658 he married Andreana d' Avalos, daughter of Andrea d'Avalos, Prince di Montesarchio (1618-1709) and his wife, Andreana di Sangro. They had one son:

- Ottaviano di Medici (1660-1710); married Teresa de Mari, daughter of Carlo I de Mari, Prince di Acquaviva (1661-1689) and his wife, Gironima Doria. They had issue.

Italian nobility
Preceded by Ottaviano de' Medici	Prince of Ottajano	Succeeded by Giuseppe de' Medici
