= Giulio de' Medici (died 1598) =

Illegitimate son of Alessandro de' Medici

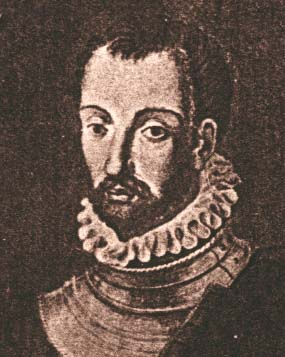
- Born: c. 1532; Prato, Duchy of Florence
- Died: 25 March 1598 (aged 65–66); Pisa, Grand Duchy of Tuscany
- Buried: San Frediano, Pisa
- Noble family: Medici
- Spouse: Angelica Malaspina
- Issue: Caterina de' Medici; Cosimo de' Medici (illegitimate); Giuliano de' Medici (illegitimate)
- Father: Alessandro de' Medici, Duke of Florence
- Mother: Taddea Malaspina

Giulio di Alessandro de' Medici (c. 1532–25 March 1598) was the illegitimate son of Alessandro de' Medici, the Duke of Florence, and probably of Taddea Malaspina.

Aged about four at the time of his father's assassination, he was passed over as a choice for the succession in favour of Cosimo I de' Medici, the first of the "junior" branch of the Medici to rule Florence. He was placed under the guardianship of Cosimo I and raised at his court. In 1562 he was appointed the first knight of the Order of Saint Stephen, an order founded to combat pirates and Turks in the Mediterranean Sea. As Admiral of the Order, from 1563 to 1566, he was sent to help the Knights Hospitallers during the Siege of Malta in 1565. He also acted as an ambassador, to Mantua in 1565; to Rome in 1571 and again in 1573.

Pompeo Litta mistakenly stated that Giulio was married to Lucrezia Gaetani, who was in fact married to his son Cosimo and bore him Angelica de' Medici (1608-1636). Actually Giulio married Angelica Malaspina and had a daughter, Caterina, who became a Benedictine nun at the Monastero delle Murate in Florence and died in 1634. He also had two illegitimate sons, Cosimo (1550-1630), who followed him as a knight of the Order of Saint Stephen, and Giuliano (d.1598).
