= Princes of Ottajano =

Italian noble family

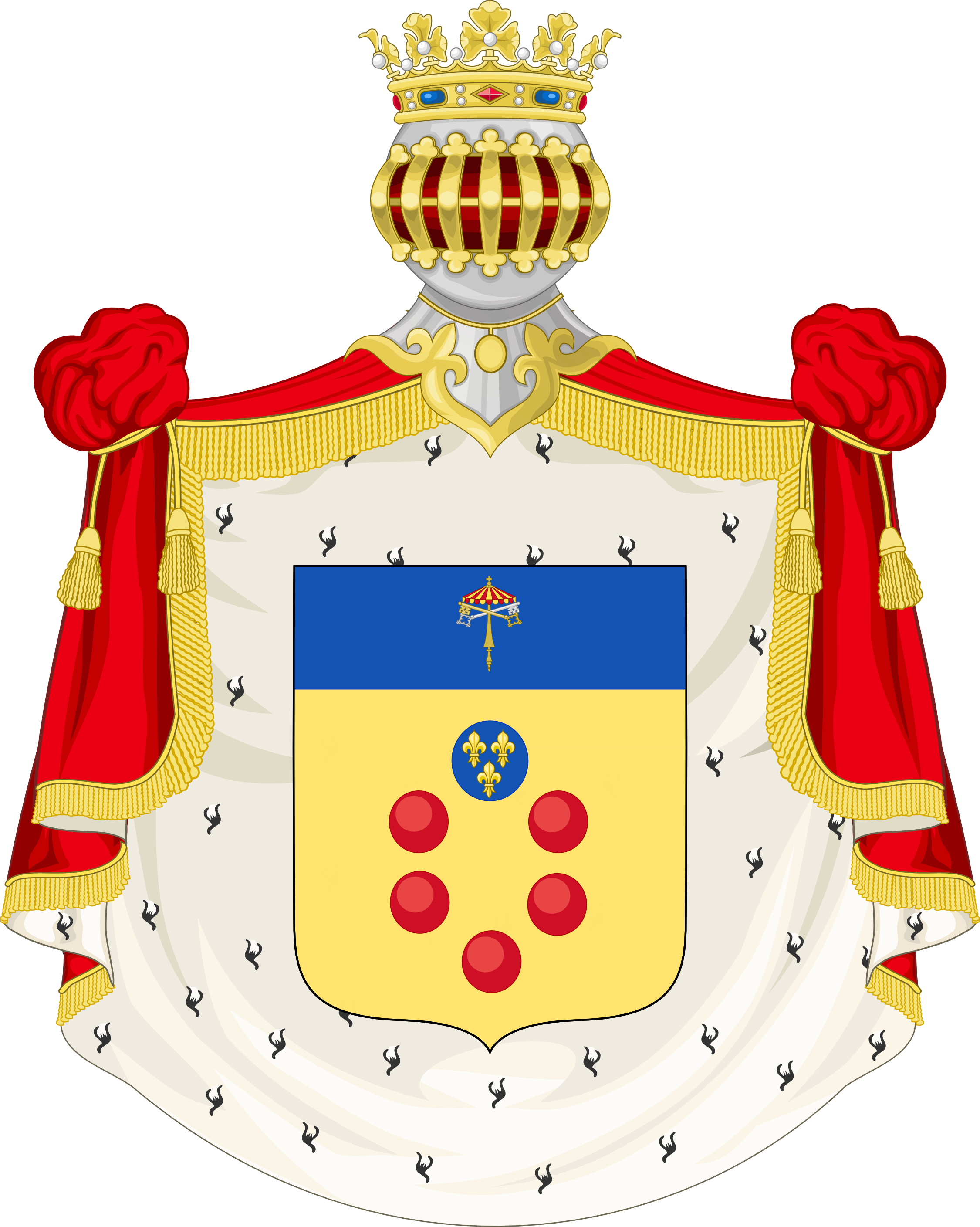
Coat of arms of the family

The Princes of Ottajano (or Ottaiano) are a cadet branch of the ducal dynasty of Tuscany. Along with the Veronese Medici Counts of Caprara, and Gavardo, they make up the closest relatives to the main line of the House of Medici, which ended in the 18th century with no descendants.

== History ==
The founder of the Ottajano line was Ottaviano de' Medici, who married Bartholomea Giugni and gave issue to Bernardetto and Countess Constance, della Gherardesca of Donoratico. Bernardetto married Giulia de' Medici, an illegitimate daughter of Alessandro de' Medici, Duke of Florence, descended from Cosimo il Vecchio and Lorenzo the Magnificent of the Medici family's senior line. It was Bernardetto who bought from Gonzaga in 1567 the fiefdom of Ottaviano, located near Naples.

Over the centuries, this remaining House of Medici has reached a leading position in the aristocracy of the Kingdom of Two Sicilies. Among the members of the dynasty are leaders of the Roman Catholic Church, ambassadors, cardinals (Francesco de Medici di Ottaiano), a pope, and Don Luigi de' Medici, representative of the Kingdom of Naples at the Congress of Vienna.

=== Tuscan succession claim ===
In his book "The History of My Dynasty," Ottaviano de' Medici points to Vatican law at the time and claims that either the Medici Princes of Ottaiano or the Veronese Medici should have inherited the Grand Duchy of Tuscany upon the death of last of the Medici Grand Dukes, Gian Gastone de' Medici, instead of the Habsburg-Lorraine line, since both Medici branches were closer descendants than Francis Stephen of Lorraine (Francis I, Holy Roman Emperor), who was a great-great-great-grandson of Francesco I de' Medici via the female line. However, due to the Habsburg-Lorraine influence, they were able to secure Florence for themselves.

=== 21st century ===
The branch is still in existence under the current head, Giuliano de' Medici di Toscana di Ottajano, who holds the titles of 14th Prince of Ottajano and 12th Duke of Sarno. The Princes of Ottaiano and the Veronese Counts have common ancestry with most royal monarchies, and the branches are the collateral branch of the House of Medici. In the modern day, the resulting House of Medici has still maintained close ties with the remains of the House of Bonaparte.

== List of princes of Ottajano ==
- 1606–1693: Ottaviano de' Medici, 1st Prince of Ottajano
- 1693–1717: Giuseppe de' Medici, 2nd Prince of Ottajano
- 1717-1763: Giuseppe de' Medici, 3rd Prince of Ottajano
- 1763-1770: Michele de' Medici, 4th Prince of Ottajano
- 1770-1793: Giuseppe de' Medici, 5th Prince of Ottajano
- 1793-1832: Michele de' Medici, 6th Prince of Ottajano
- 1832–1874: Giuseppe de' Medici, 7th Prince of Ottajano
- 1874–1883: Michele de' Medici di Ottajano, 8th Prince of Ottajano
- 1883–1894: Giuseppe de' Medici, 9th Prince of Ottajano
- 1894–1912: Angelica de' Medici, 10th Princess of Ottajano
- 1912–1925: Alberto Marino de' Medici, 11th Prince of Ottajano
- 1925–1983: Armando de' Medici, 12th Prince of Ottajano
- 1983–2015: Giovanni Battista de' Medici di Ottajano, 13th Prince of Ottajano
- 2015–Current Giuliano de' Medici di Ottajano, 14th Prince of Ottajano

== See also ==
- Republic of Florence
- Medici
- Albizzi
- Duchy of Florence
- Alberti
- Italian Renaissance
- Medici family tree
- Grand Duchy of Tuscany
- Pazzi
