= Taddea Malaspina =

Italian noble

- Born: 1505
- Died: 1559 (aged 53–54)
- Spouse: Count Giambattista Boiardo di Scandiano
- Children: likely, illegitimate Giulio de' Medici; Giulia de' Medici
- Parent(s): Antonio Alberico II Malaspina (father), Lucrezia d'Este (mother)

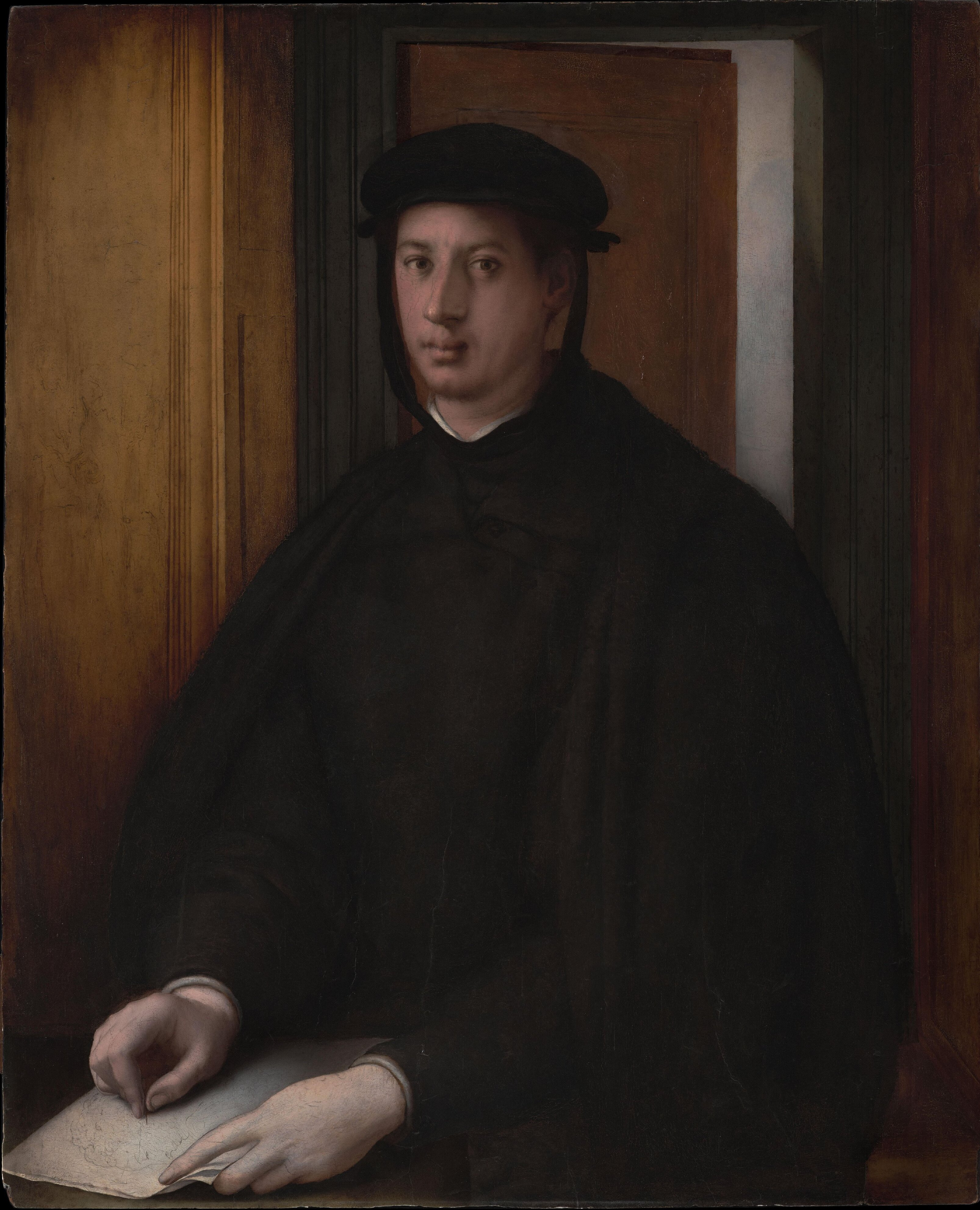
Alessandro de' Medici, Duke of Florence draws the profile of a woman in silverpoint in about 1535 in this portrait by Pontormo. The woman's profile is thought to be that of Taddea Malaspina, his mistress.

Taddea Malaspina (1505 - 1559) was an Italian noblewoman of the 16th century. A scion of the Massa branch of the ancient Malaspina family, she was the mistress of Alessandro de' Medici, Duke of Florence, from the early 1530s to about 1537 and was likely the mother of at least two of his children, Giulio and Giulia de' Medici. Giulio de' Medici was associated with the Malaspina family at different points throughout his life.

== Biography ==
Taddea was born as the youngest daughter of Antonio Alberico II Malaspina, sovereign Marquis of Massa, and his wife, Lucrezia d'Este, who fathered no sons. She married Count Giambattista Boiardo di Scandiano. After his death and the death of her father, Malaspina lived with her mother in Florence and had a number of lovers, including young Duke Alessandro de' Medici himself. Her elder sister Ricciarda, who had shrewdly managed to retain their father's feudal titles in defiance of the Salic law, lived for long periods with Taddea and their mother: the three enjoyed a dubious reputation as "the marquises of Massa" and were also joined by Ricciarda's siblings-in-law, Cardinal Innocenzo Cybo (also her lover en titre and father of several of her children, probably including her heir Alberico) and Caterina Cybo, former Duchess of Camerino, in whose family's Florentine residences they used to dwell. Through Ricciarda's marriage to the Genoese nobleman Lorenzo Cybo, the family was related to erstwhile Pope Innocent VIII and to the Medici: Pope Leo X and Pope Clement VII were respectively Ricciarda's uncle-in-law and cousin-in-law, and, moreover, she was probably one of Alessandro's lovers herself.

== Legacy ==
In a portrait of Alessandro by Pontormo, dated to about 1535, the Duke, dressed in black, draws the profile of a woman in silverpoint. The portrait may have been a gift for Malaspina for the birth of their daughter Giulia.

The Chiesa della Madonna del Carmine and the adjoining Santa Chiara monastic complex in Massa were built at Taddea Malaspina's behest in 1554; they still stand.

== See also ==
- Ricciarda Malaspina, Taddea's sister
