= Maria Salviati =

Florentine noblewoman

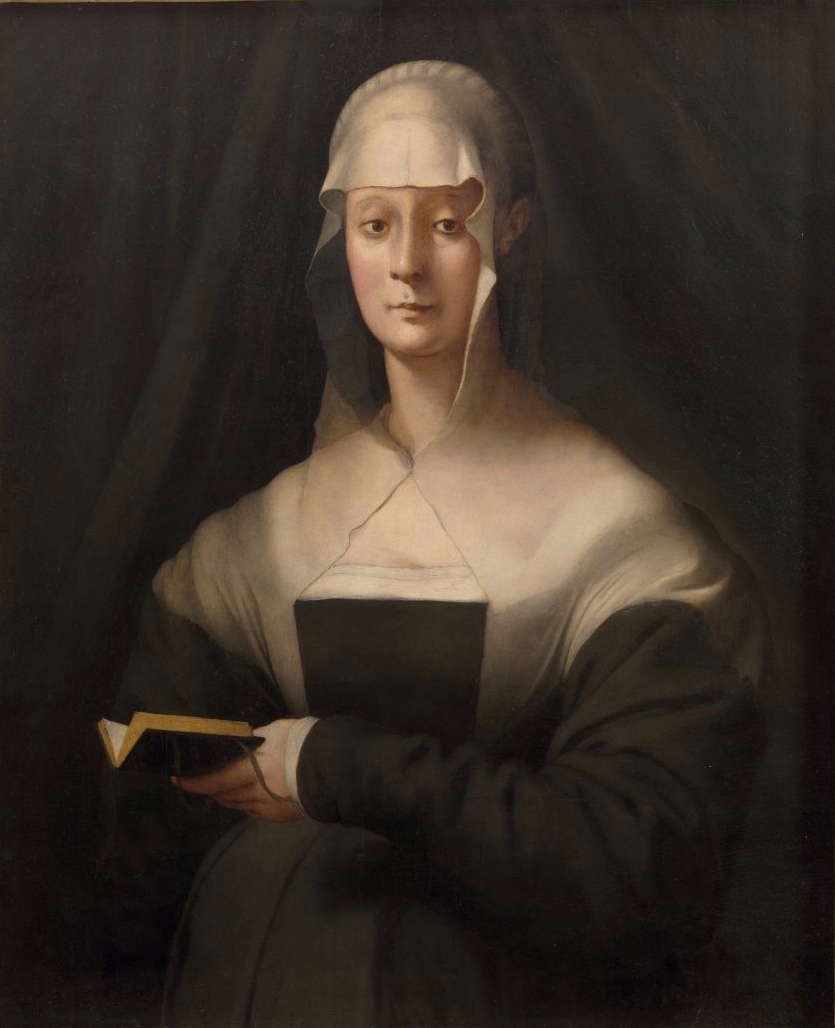
- Portrait of Maria Salviati by Pontormo, c. 1543. Oil on panel; 87 x 71 cm. Florence, Uffizi Gallery
- Born: 17 July 1499; Florence, Republic of Florence
- Died: 12 December 1543 (aged 44); Villa di Castello, Republic of Florence
- Noble family: Salviati (by birth); Medici (by marriage)
- Spouse: Giovanni delle Bande Nere
- Issue: Cosimo I de Medici
- Father: Jacopo Salviati
- Mother: Lucrezia di Lorenzo de' Medici

Maria Salviati (17 July 1499 – 29 December 1543) was a Florentine noblewoman, the daughter of Lucrezia di Lorenzo de' Medici and Jacopo Salviati. She married Giovanni delle Bande Nere and was the mother of Cosimo I de Medici. Her husband died 30 November 1526, leaving her a widow at the age of 27. Salviati never remarried; after her husband's death she adopted the somber garb of a novice, which is how she is remembered today as numerous late portraits show her attired in black and white.

== Life ==
Maria Salviati was born in Florence. She descended from two of Florence's most powerful banking families: the Salviati on her father's side, and the de' Medici on her mother's. Her maternal grandfather was Lorenzo "il Magnifico".

When her cousin, Alessandro de' Medici was assassinated in 1537, Maria used her family connections to get involved in the discussions to decide the next Duke of Florence. She played a key role in getting her son, Cosimo I de' Medici, elected.

=== Bia de' Medici ===
Maria set up residence at Villa di Castello in northern Florence, where she would look after her grandchildren. Her son Cosimo had an illegitimate daughter named Bia de' Medici. Maria described Bia as a very happy and talkative little girl, often having long conversations with her.

Cosimo married Eleonora di Toledo in 1539. It was rumoured that Eleonora refused to tolerate Bia's presence in the palace after their marriage so Cosimo sent Bia off to live with Maria. Other sources say that Eleonora brought Bia up very lovingly. Bia shared a nursery with Giulia de' Medici an illegitimate daughter of Alessandro de' Medici, Duke of Florence, the pair being close in age. Maria knew who Bia's mother was but she would never tell Bia or anyone else the name of the woman. Both Bia and her cousin Giulia contracted a virulent fever; Giulia recovered from the illness but Bia only worsened and eventually died on 1 March 1542 aged only five years. Maria and Cosimo were said to be very sad by her loss.

Maria died one year after Bia on 29 December 1543.

=== Portrait of Maria Salviati with Giulia de' Medici ===
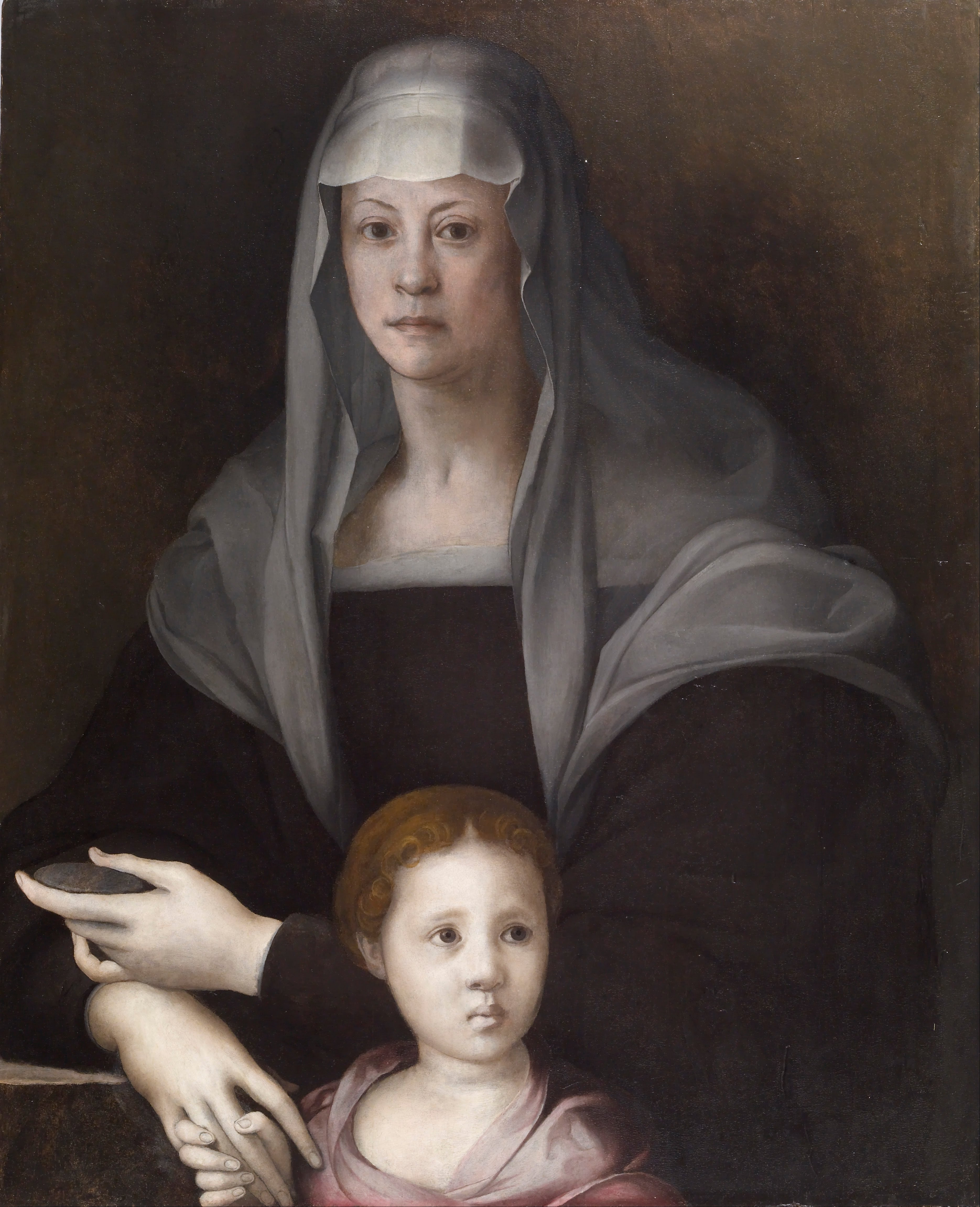
Maria Salviati with Giulia de' Medici, by Pontormo, c. 1537; Oil on panel, Baltimore, The Walters Art Museum

In the portrait called "Maria Salviati with Giulia de' Medici", there are many theories on who the portrait portrays. However, the almost universally accepted portrait is the one depicted by Pontormo in 1543-1544. The different theories arise from the overpainting of the portrait as well as the views of different sellers.

At the end of the nineteenth century, the work was attributed to Piombo where the portrait looked different by the child being taken out and the single women identified as being Vittoria Colonna. In 1937, the overpainting by Piombo was removed, revealing the child where Edward S. King (1940) misinterpreted the child to be a boy, publishing it as the portrait of Maria Salviati and Her Son Cosimo. Others came forward disagreeing with the gender of the child asserted in King's argument. It was not until 1992, where Gabrielle Langdon proposed the painting of the child to not only be a girl, but Giulia de' Medici. He was able to discover this based on the different attributes the painting held. He pointed out that the child was under the age of seven, the connection between the bare throat of Maria's and the child is strong showing femininity, as well as being shown as vulnerable under the protection of Maria Salviati.

== Influence on medicine ==
Maria Salviati had an influence on medicine that is not as pronounced as other aspects of her life. Her influence with medicine is expressed in daily care routine and critical decision making that brought her into contact with many different professionals of medicine. The beginning of her interaction with medicine took place in the 1530-1540s as a household healer. Her familiarities arose in remedies and health regimens which left impacts on pharmacy, pediatrics, and local healing. It was believed that Maria Salviati, with her social standing, had access to information that promoted health literacy such as manuscripts. Most of them being handwritten recipe books that provided a basis for medical authority for women in order to navigate problems and pharmaceutical practices. One of the more significant recipe books believed to be in Salviati's hand was an Italian recipe book compiled by Caterina Sforza (1463–1509), her mother-in-law. Part of the book contained recipes for powders and pills to cure fever, elixirs to strengthen the body, and concoctions to help with infection. With this underlying knowledge of remedies, Salviati was able to experiment and develop a "secrete" remedy for intestinal worms which were found mostly in children.

Maria Salviati's influence in medicine abundant with pediatrics. With her medical knowledge, she partook in overseeing practices with Wet nursing and the selection process, which was uncommon at the time, for the Medici ducal couple's offspring. Over the years, she continued to oversee the Medici children with their health statuses mainly through Humorism reasoning and influences of celestial bodies.

== Death ==
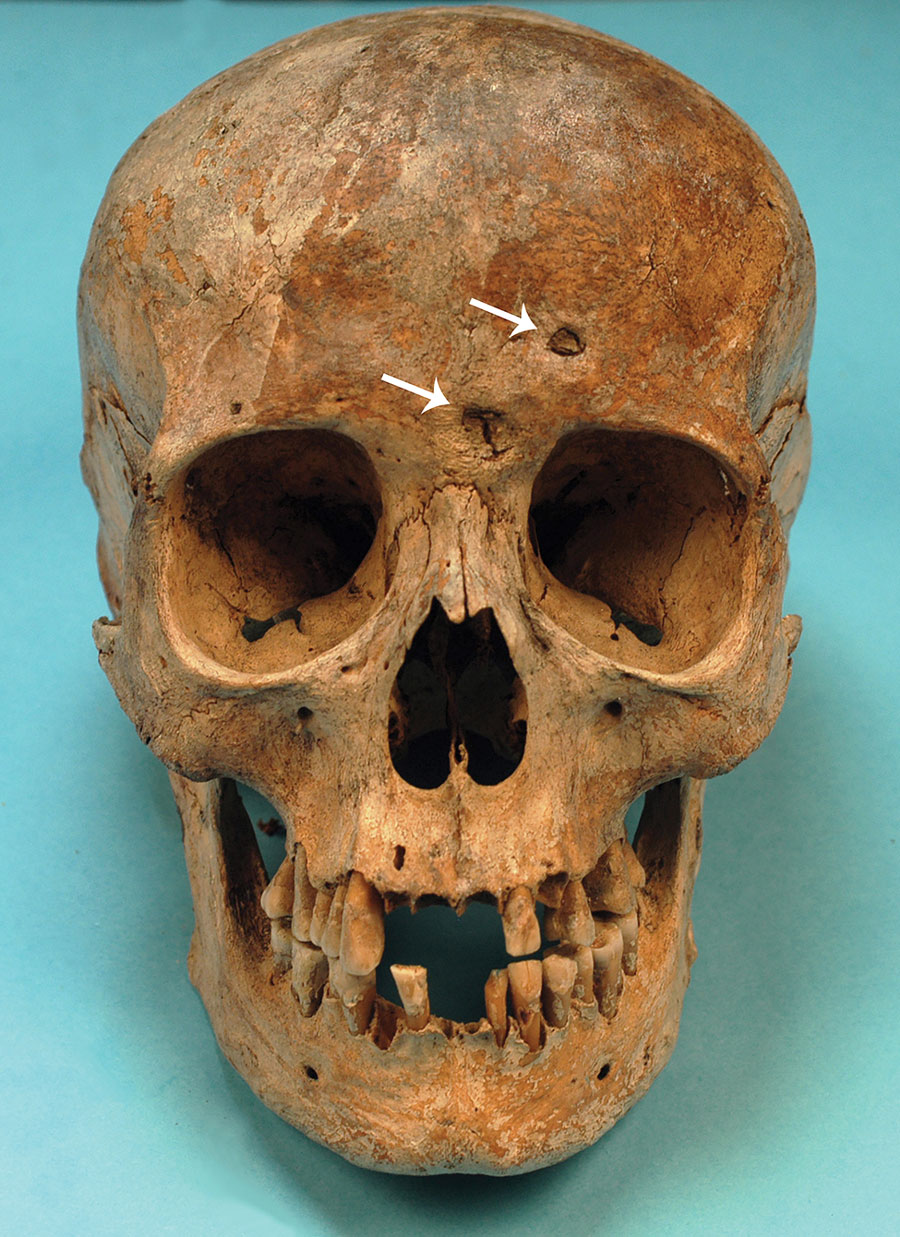
Lesions in the skull of Maria Salviati showing tertiary signs of syphilis

Syphilis became a prominent disease around the time of Maria's existence. Maria Salviati's skeletal remains showed skeletal lesions, corresponding to effects syphilis has in the third stage of the infection. In the 1540s, Maria started to decline in health where the court physician, Andrea Pasquali, included symptoms such as recurring proctorrhagia, headaches, and rectal and perianal ulcers. To further back the evidence of Maria's effect with syphilis, scientists and archeologist exhumed her skeletal remains and performed studies. Studies showed that Maria had lytic lesions in her skull which strongly suggest tertiary syphilis.

== Ancestors ==
Alemanno Salviati
Giovanni Salviati
Catherine de' Medici
Jacopo Salviati
Simone Gondi
Elena Gondi
Maria Buondelmonti
Maria Salviati
Piero di Cosimo de' Medici
Lorenzo de' Medici
Lucrezia Tornabuoni
Lucrezia de' Medici
Jacopo Orsini, Lord of Monterotondo
Clarice Orsini
Maddalena Orsini

== Descendants ==
Salviati's descendants became crowned figureheads of Europe over the succeeding generations. Her grandson Francesco I de' Medici married Johanna of Austria; they were the parents of Eleonora de' Medici, who married Vincenzo I Gonzaga and was the mother of Francesco IV Gonzaga. Francesco and Johanna's other daughter was Marie de' Medici, who married Henry IV of France and was the mother of Louis XIII and Henrietta Maria of France. Louis was the father of Louis XIV, Henrietta Maria was the mother of Charles II of England and James II of England.

Descendants of Maria Salviati in 5 generations
Maria Salviati	Son: Cosimo I de' Medici Grand Duke of Tuscany	Grandson: Francesco I de' Medici Grand duke of Tuscany	Great-granddaughter: Marie de' Medici Queen of France	Great-Great-granddaughter: Henrietta Maria of France Queen of England	Great-Great-Great-granddaughter: Henrietta Anne Stuart Duchess of Orleans

== Sources ==
- Langdon, G. (2006). The Medici Women- Portraits of Power, Love, and Betrayal. University of Toronto Press.
- Tomas, Natalie R. (2003). The Medici Women: Gender and Power in Renaissance Florence. Aldershot: Ashgate. ISBN 0754607771.
