= Cosimo I de' Medici =

Duke of Florence later Grand Duke of Tuscany (1537–1574)

Cosimo I
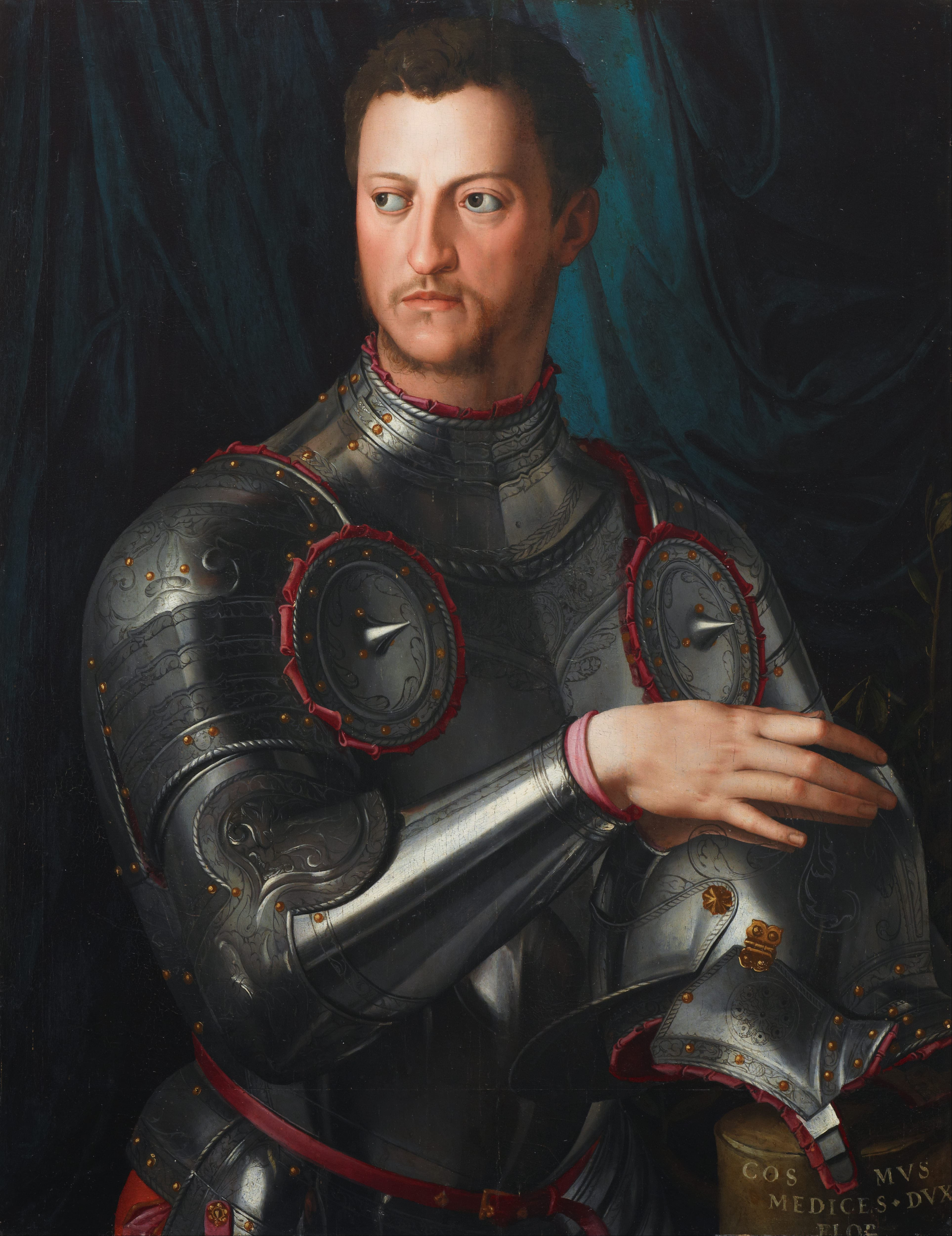
- Portrait of Cosimo I de' Medici, c. 1545

Duke of Florence
- Reign: 6 January 1537 – 21 August 1569
- Predecessor: Alessandro

Grand Duke of Tuscany
- Reign: 21 August 1569 – 21 April 1574
- Successor: Francesco I
- Born: 12 June 1519; Florence, Republic of Florence
- Died: 21 April 1574 (aged 54); Florence, Grand Duchy of Tuscany
- Spouse: Eleanor of Toledo (m. 1539; died 1562) Camilla Martelli (m. 1570)
- Issue more...: Bia de' Medici; Maria de' Medici; Francesco I de' Medici; Isabella, Duchess of Bracciano; Cardinal Giovanni; Lucrezia, Duchess of Modena; Garzia; Ferdinando I de' Medici; Pietro; Virginia, Duchess of Modena
Names
- Cosimo I de' Medici
- House: Medici
- Father: Giovanni delle Bande Nere
- Mother: Maria Salviati
- Religion: Catholicism

Cosimo I de' Medici (12 June 1519 – 21 April 1574) was the second and last duke of Florence from 1537 until 1569, when he became the first grand duke of Tuscany, a title he held until his death. Cosimo I succeeded his cousin to the duchy. He built the Uffizi (office) to organize his administration, and conquered Siena to consolidate Florence's rule in Tuscany. He expanded the Pitti Palace and most of the Boboli Gardens were also laid out during his reign.

== Life ==
=== Rise to power ===
Cosimo was born in Florence on 12 June 1519, the son of the famous condottiere Ludovico de' Medici (known as Giovanni delle Bande Nere) and his wife Maria Salviati, herself a granddaughter of Lorenzo the Magnificent. He was the grandson of Caterina Sforza, the Countess of Forlì and Lady of Imola. Cosimo became Duke of Florence in 1537 at age 17, after the former Duke of Florence, Alessandro de' Medici, was assassinated. Cosimo was from a different branch of the Medici family, descended from Giovanni il Popolano, the great-grandson of Giovanni di Bicci de' Medici, founder of the Medici Bank. It was necessary to search for a successor outside of the "senior" branch of the Medici family descended from Cosimo di Giovanni de' Medici, since the only male child of Alessandro, the last lineal descendant of the senior branch, was born out-of-wedlock and was only four years old at the time of his father's death.

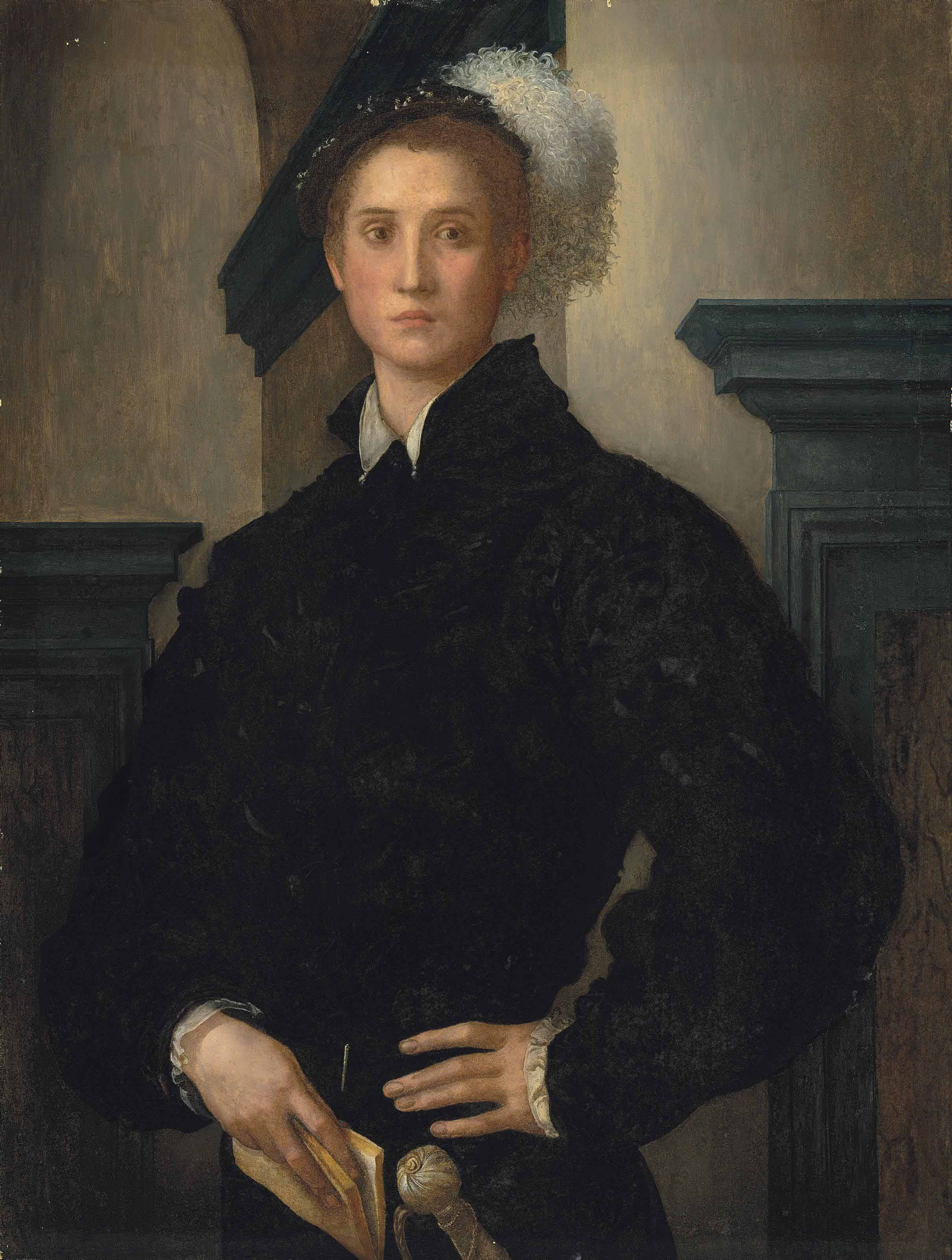
Cosimo I de' Medici at about 19 years of age (by Pontormo, c. 1538)

Up to the time of his accession, Cosimo had lived only in Mugello (the ancestral homeland of the Medici family) and was almost unknown in Florence. However, many of the influential men in the city favoured him as the new duke. Several hoped to rule through him, thereby enriching themselves at the state's expense. However, as the Florentine literatus Benedetto Varchi famously put it, "The innkeeper's reckoning was different from the glutton's." Cosimo proved strong-willed, astute and ambitious and soon rejected the clause he had signed that entrusted much of the power of the Florentine duchy to a Council of Forty-Eight.

When the Florentine exiles heard of the death of Alessandro, they marshalled their forces with support from France and from disgruntled neighbors of Florence. During this time, Cosimo had an illegitimate daughter, Bia (1537 – 1542), who was portrayed shortly before her premature death in a painting by Bronzino.

Toward the end of July 1537, the exiles marched into Tuscany under the leadership of Bernardo Salviati and Piero Strozzi. When Cosimo heard of their approach, he sent his best troops under Alessandro Vitelli to engage the enemy, which they did at Montemurlo. After defeating the exiles' army, Vitelli stormed the fortress, where Strozzi and a few of his companions had retreated to safety. It fell after only a few hours, and Cosimo celebrated his first victory. The prominent prisoners were subsequently beheaded on the Piazza della Signoria or in the Bargello. Filippo Strozzi's body was found with a bloody sword next to it and a note quoting Virgil, but many believe that his suicide was faked.

=== Rule of Tuscany ===
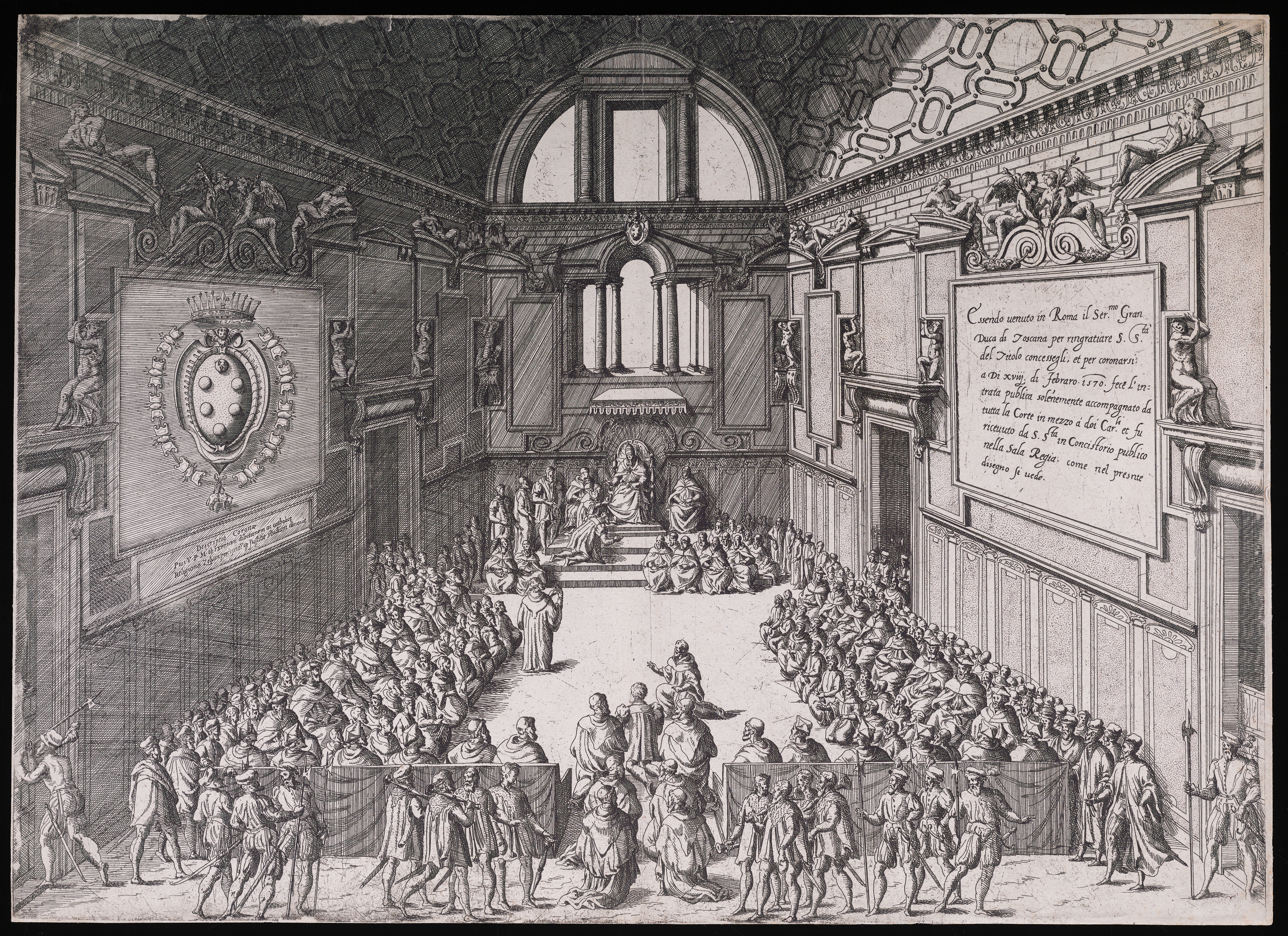
The coronation of Cosimo as Grand Duke of Tuscany by Pope Pius V in the Sala Regia of the Vatican Palace

In 1537, Cosimo sent Bernardo Antonio de' Medici to Holy Roman Emperor Charles V to gain recognition for his position as head of the Florentine state. That recognition came in June 1537 in exchange for help against France in the course of the Italian Wars. With this move, Cosimo firmly restored the power of the Medici, who thereafter ruled Florence until the death of the last of the Medici rulers, Gian Gastone de' Medici, in 1737. The help granted to Charles V allowed him to free Tuscany from the Imperial garrisons and to increase as much as possible its independence from the overwhelming Spanish influence in Italy.

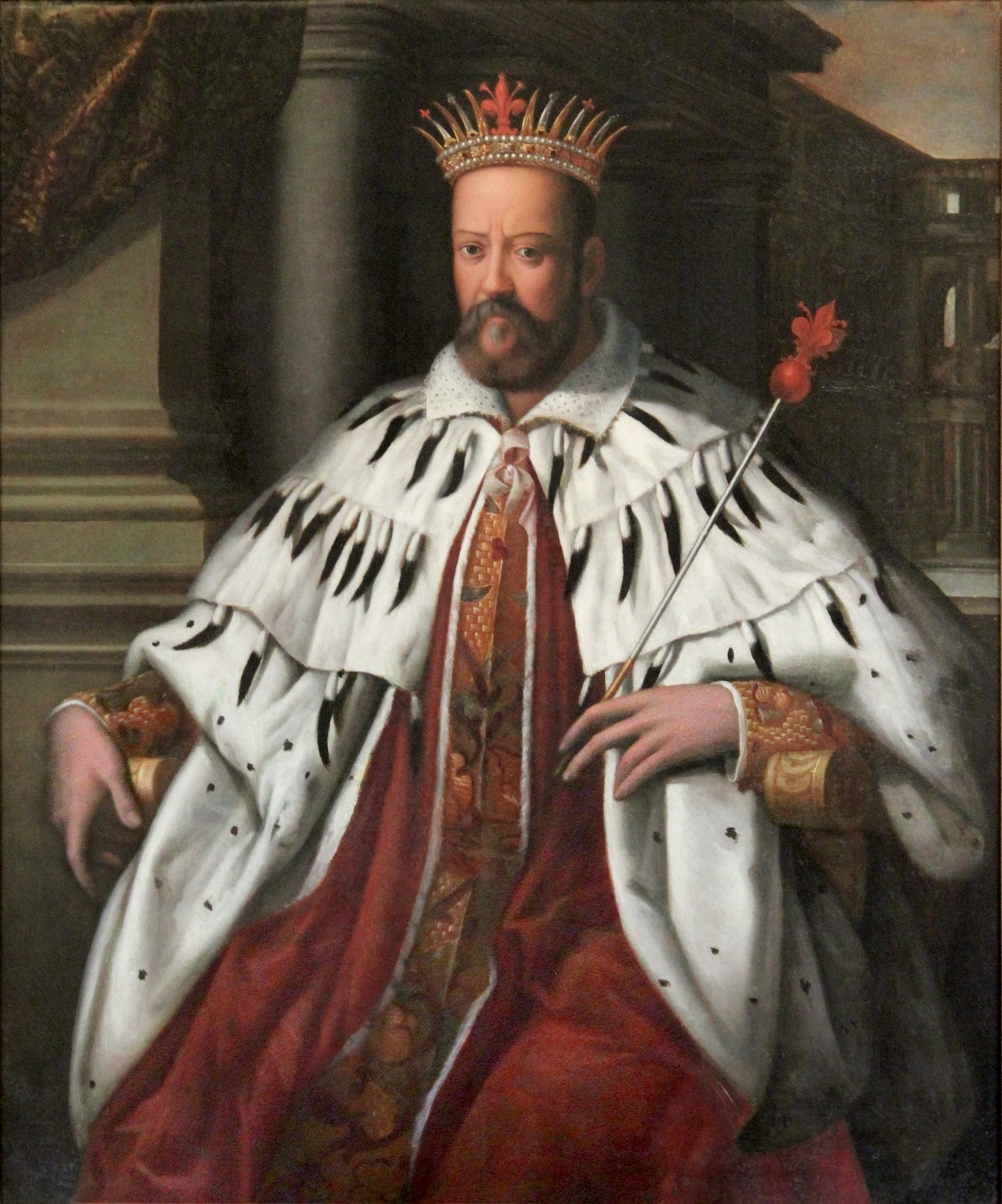
Official portrait of Cosimo I de' Medici as Grand Duke of Tuscany by Giovanni Battista Naldini

Cosimo next turned his attention to Siena. With the support of Charles V, he defeated the Sienese at the Battle of Marciano in 1554 and laid siege to their city. Despite the inhabitants' desperate resistance, the city fell on 17 April 1555 after a 15-month siege, its population diminished from 40,000 to 8,000 people. In 1559, Montalcino, the last redoubt of Sienese independence, was annexed to Cosimo's territories. In 1569, Pope Pius V elevated him to the rank of Grand Duke of Tuscany.

In the last 10 years of his reign, struck by the death of two of his sons by malaria, Cosimo gave up active rule of the Florentine state to his son and successor Francesco I. He retreated to live in his villa, the Villa di Castello, outside Florence.

== Statesmanship ==
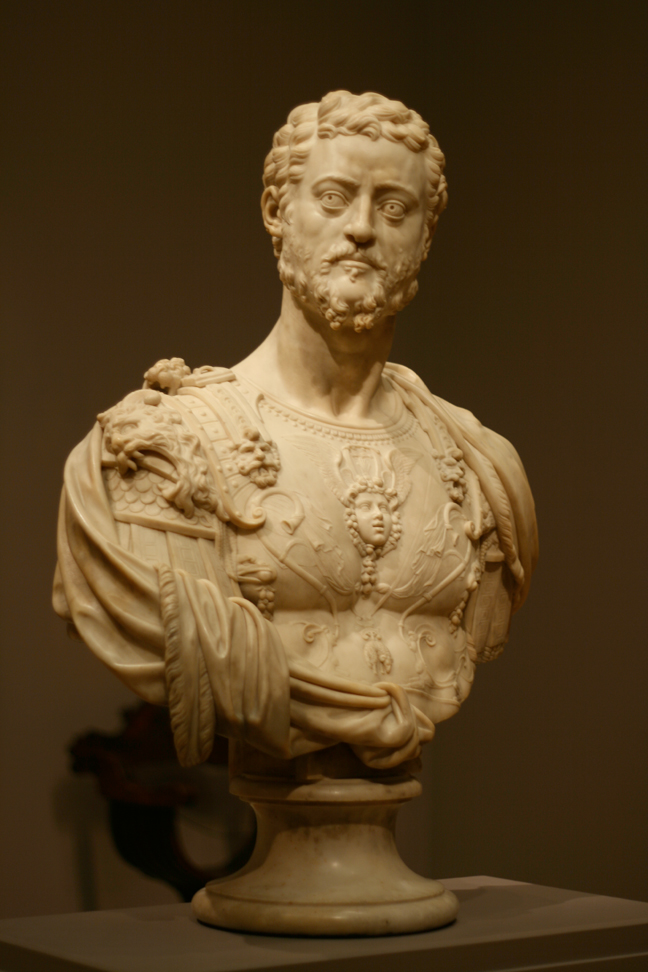
Portrait bust from the workshop of Benvenuto Cellini, ca. 1550

Cosimo was an authoritarian ruler and secured his position by employing a guard of Swiss mercenaries. In 1548, he managed to have his relative Lorenzino, the last Medici claimant to Florence who had earlier arranged the assassination of Cosimo's predecessor Alessandro, assassinated himself in Venice. Cosimo also was an active builder of military structures, as a part of his attempt to save the Florentine state from the frequent passage of foreign armies. Examples include the new fortresses of Siena, Arezzo, Sansepolcro, the new walls of Pisa and Fivizzano and the strongholds of Portoferraio on the island of Elba and Terra del Sole.

He laid heavy tax burdens on his subjects. Despite his economic difficulties, Cosimo I was a lavish patron of the arts and also developed the Florentine navy, which eventually took part in the Battle of Lepanto, and which he entrusted to his new creation, the Knights of St. Stephen.

== Patronage of the arts ==
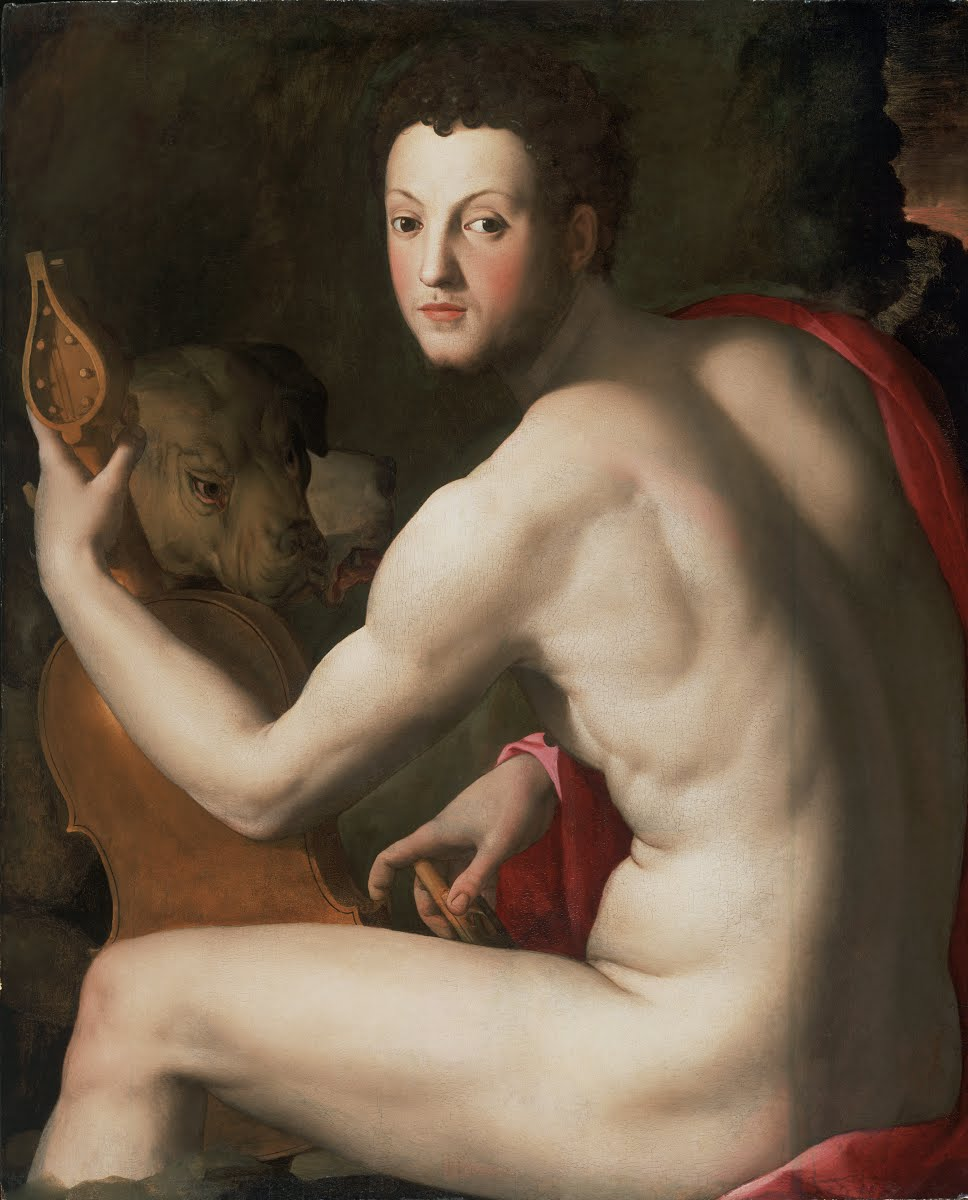
Cosimo as Orpheus, by Bronzino

Cosimo is perhaps best known today for the creation of the Uffizi ("offices"). Originally intended as a means of consolidating his administrative control of the various committees, agencies, and guilds established in Florence's Republican past, it now houses one of the world's most important collections of art, much of it commissioned and/or owned by various members of the Medici family.

His gardens at Villa di Castello, designed by Niccolò Tribolo when Cosimo was only seventeen years old, were designed to announce a new golden age for Florence and to demonstrate the magnificence and virtues of the Medici. They were decorated with fountains, a labyrinth, a grotto and ingenious ornamental water features, and were a prototype for the Italian Renaissance garden. They had a profound influence on later Italian and French gardens through the eighteenth century.

Cosimo also finished the Pitti Palace as a home for the Medici and created the magnificent Boboli Gardens behind the Pitti. As his more prominent ancestors had been, he was also an important patron of the arts, supporting, among others, Giorgio Vasari, Benvenuto Cellini, Pontormo, Bronzino, the architect Baldassarre Lanci, and the historians Scipione Ammirato and Benedetto Varchi.

A large bronze equestrian statue of Cosimo I by Giambologna, erected in 1598, still stands today in the Piazza della Signoria, the main square of Florence.

Cosimo was also an enthusiast of alchemy, a passion he inherited from his grandmother Caterina Sforza.

== Marriage and family ==
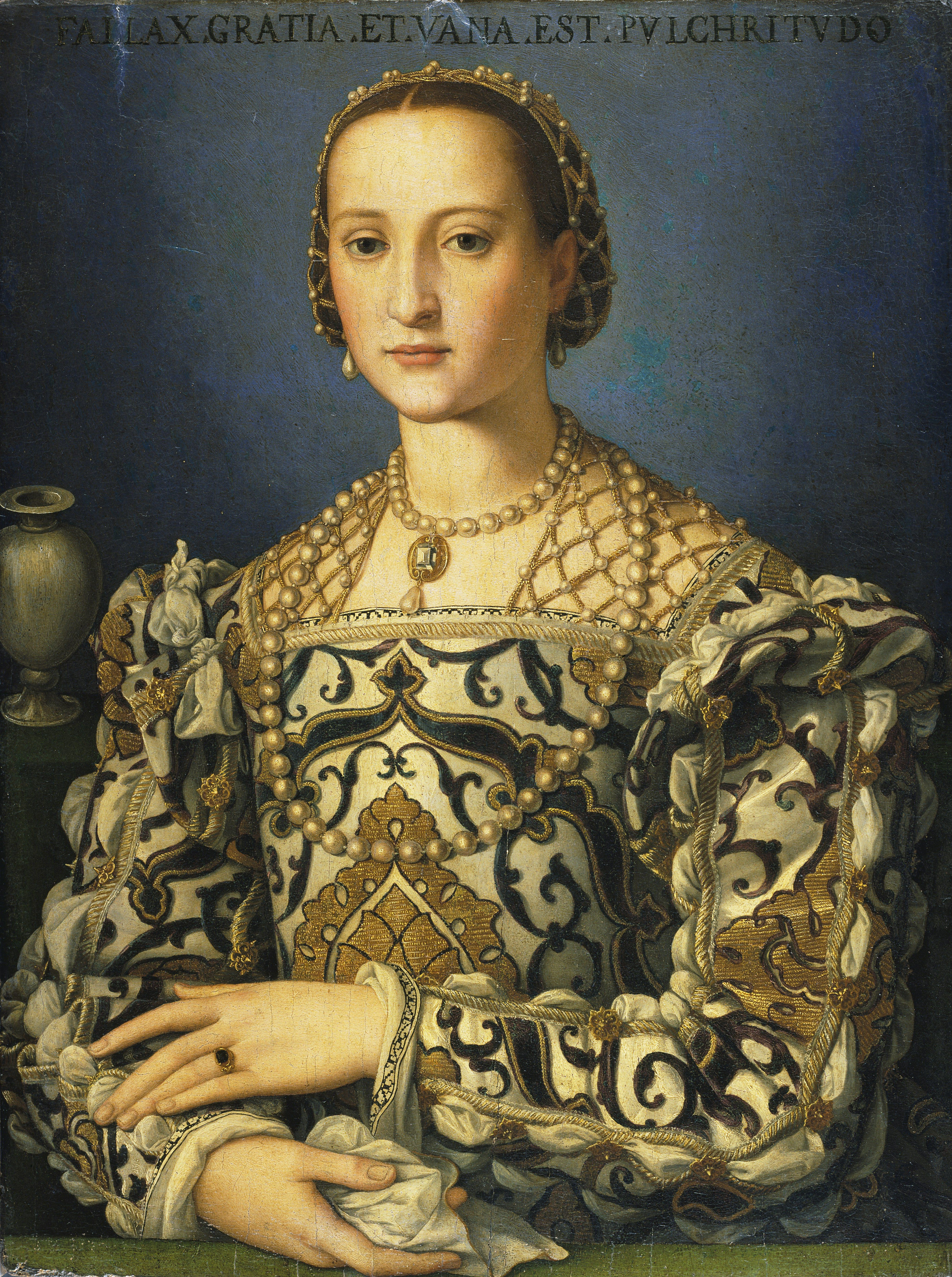
Eleanor of Toledo, Duchess of Florence, who purchased the Palazzo Pitti in 1549 for the Medici family.

In 1539, Cosimo married the Spanish noblewoman Eleanor of Toledo (1522 – 1562), the daughter of Don Pedro Álvarez de Toledo, the Spanish viceroy of Naples. The couple had a long and peaceful married life. Surprisingly for the era, Cosimo was faithful to his wife throughout their married life. The example of a traditional couple served to strengthen his various reforms and separate their association with the former Duke. Eleanor was a political adviser to her husband and often ruled Florence in his absence. She provided the Medici with the Pitti Palace and was a patron of the new Jesuit order. The Duchess died with her sons Giovanni and Garzia in 1562, when she was only forty; all three of them were struck down by malaria while traveling to Pisa.

Cosimo and Eleanor had:

- Maria (3 April 1540 – 19 November 1557), engaged to Alfonso II d'Este, but died before the marriage
- Francesco (25 March 1541 – 19 October 1587), Cosimo's successor as Grand Duke of Tuscany
- Isabella (31 August 1542 – 16 July 1576), murdered by her husband Paolo Giordano I Orsini because of infidelity
- Giovanni (28 September 1543 – 20 November 1562), who became Bishop of Pisa and a cardinal
- Lucrezia (7 June 1545 – 21 April 1561), who married Alfonso II d'Este, Duke of Ferrara and Modena, in 1560
- Pietro (Pedricco) (10 August 1546 – 10 June 1547), who died in infancy
- Garzia (5 July 1547 – 12 December 1562), who died of malaria at age 15
- Antonio (1 July 1548 – July 1548), who died in infancy
- Ferdinando (30 July 1549 – 17 February 1609), Francesco's successor as Grand Duke of Tuscany
- Anna (19 March 1553 – 6 August 1553), who died in infancy
- Pietro (3 June 1554 – 25 April 1604), who murdered his wife Eleonora di Garzia di Toledo

Before his first marriage, Cosimo fathered an illegitimate daughter with an unknown woman:

- Bia de' Medici (ca. 1536 – March 1, 1542)

After Eleanor's death in 1562, Cosimo fathered two children with his mistress Eleonora degli Albizzi:

- an unnamed daughter (born and died 1566) who died before baptism
- Giovanni (1567 – 1621), later legitimized by his father

In 1570, Cosimo married Camilla Martelli (died 1590) and fathered one child with her:

- Virginia (29 May 1568 – 15 January 1615), who married Cesare d'Este, Duke of Modena

== Sources ==
- Acidini, Cristina, ed. (2002). The Medici, Michelangelo, & the Art of Late Renaissance Florence. Yale University Press.
- Bercusson, Sarah (2017). "Strategies for survival: women at the court of the Medici (1565-1578)". In Norrhem, Svante; Daybell, James (eds.). Gender and Political Culture in Early Modern Europe, 1400-1800. Routledge. pp. 158–176.
- Clifton, James (2016). "The Triumph of Truth in an Age of Confessional Conflict". In Melion, Walter; Ramakers, Bart A. M. (eds.). Personification: Embodying Meaning and Emotion. Brill. pp. 162–185.
- Crews, Daniel A. (2008). Twilight of the Renaissance: The Life of Juan de Valdés. University of Toronto Press.
- Davies, Jonathan (2009). Culture and Power: Tuscany and Its Universities 1537-1609. Brill.
- Fletcher, Catherine (2016). The Black Prince of Florence: The Spectacular Life and Treacherous World of Alessandro De' Medici. Oxford University Press.
- Fossi, Gloria (2001). Uffizi Gallery: Art, History, Collections. Giunti.
- Landon, William J. (2013). Lorenzo di Filippo Strozzi and Niccolo Machiavelli. University of Toronto Press.
- Langdon, Gabrielle (2007). Medici Women: Portraits of Power, Love and Betrayal from the Court of Duke Cosimo I. University of Toronto Press.
- Loffredo, Fernando (2022). "Cosimo I and His Spanish In-Laws: The Duke and the Toledo Family". In Assonitis, Alessio; van Veen, Henk Th. (eds.). A Companion to Cosimo I de' Medici. Brill.
- Mason, Roger (1989). "The Medici-Lazara Map of Alanya". Anatolian Studies. 39: 85–105. doi:10.2307/3642815. JSTOR 3642815. S2CID 140560594.
- McHam, Sarah Blake (2017). "Giambologna's equestrian monument to Cosimo I: the monument makes the memory". In Drogin, David J. (ed.). Patronage and Italian Renaissance Sculpture. Routledge.
- Murphy, Caroline (2008). Murder of a Medici Princess. Oxford University Press.
- Sherrill, Tawny (2006). "Fleas, Fur, and Fashion: Zibellini as Luxury Accessories of the Renaissance". In Netherton, Robin; Owen-Crocker, Gale (eds.). Medieval Clothing and Textiles. Vol. 2. The Boydell Press. pp. 121–150.

Regnal titles
Preceded by Alessandro de' Medici	Duke of Florence; 1537–1569	Elevated to Grand Duchy of Tuscany
Elevated from Duchy of Florence	Grand Duke of Tuscany; 1569–1574	Succeeded by Francesco I de' Medici
