= Benvenida Abrabanel =

Italian philanthropist and businesswoman

- Born: c.1473
- Died: c.1560s
- Spouse: Samuel Abravanel (1473-1547)
- Children: Jacob, Judah, Isaac, Gioia, Letizia
- Parent: Jacob Abravanel
- Relatives: Isaac Abravanel (uncle)

Benvenida Abrabanel (Hebrew: בנבנידה אברבנאל), also written as Benvenida Abravanel, was a Sephardic philanthropist and banker-businesswoman. She lived in early modern Italy and was an influential member of the wealthy Abrabanel family. She is mentioned in numerous literary, rabbinic, legal, and archival sources of the time.

== Life ==
Benvenida was born into a prominent Spanish Jewish family as the daughter of Jacob Abravanel (d. 1528), the brother of Isaac Abravanel. Her date and place of birth remain uncertain. She received an education in both Jewish and secular subjects. Benvenida married her first cousin Samuel Abravanel, the youngest son of Isaac Abravanel. Following the Spanish Expulsion of the Jews in 1492, the Abravanel family immigrated to Naples. In Naples, Benvenida became the tutor to Eleanor of Toledo, the daughter of the Spanish Viceroy of Naples, with whom she would maintain a close friendship later in life, after Eleanor's marriage to Cosimo I de' Medici. Benvenida's husband, Samuel, meanwhile served as financial advisor to Eleanor's father, the viceroy Don Pedro.

Benvenida had several children, including three sons, Jacob, Judah, and Isaac, and three daughters, two of whom were named Gioia and Letizia. She also raised an illegitimate son of Samuel's.

In 1524–25, Benvenida became a supporter and patron of the mystic and false messiah David Reubeni, to whom she sent money and a silk banner embroidered with the Ten Commandments. Reubeni's travel diary mentions Benevenida with praise, stating that she fasted daily, ransomed a thousand captives, and was known for her charity. She was also a patron of scholarship, donating money to support the printing of books and to provide for scholars.

In 1533, the Holy Roman Emperor Charles V declared an expulsion of the Jews from Naples. Benvenida, joined by several princesses, petitioned the Emperor, leading to the order being postponed for ten years. However, in 1540, the Emperor issued an edict forcing Jews to wear a Jewish badge; following this, Benvenida and her family left Naples in 1541, eventually settling in Ferrara at the invitation of Ercole II. In Ferrara, she may have crossed paths with another powerful Sephardic Jewish woman, Dona Gracia.

Samuel died in Ferrara in 1547, and in his will made Benvenida heir to all his property except sums reserved as gifts for his children, including gifts on their marriages with the condition that Benvenida approved. His illegitimate son contested the will, arguing that a woman could not be an heir under Jewish law, which led to a major rabbinic debate over Benvenida's right to inherit in 1550–51. In one of the few points in the historical record where language is directly attributed to Benvenida, she responded to defend her rights. Ultimately, Benvenida took over Samuel's business affairs, receiving permission to open five banks in the Duchy of Florence. Many sources give her date of death as 1560, but there may be evidence that she was still alive in the 1560s.
