= Giovanni de' Medici (cardinal) =

- Cardinal of the Holy Roman Church
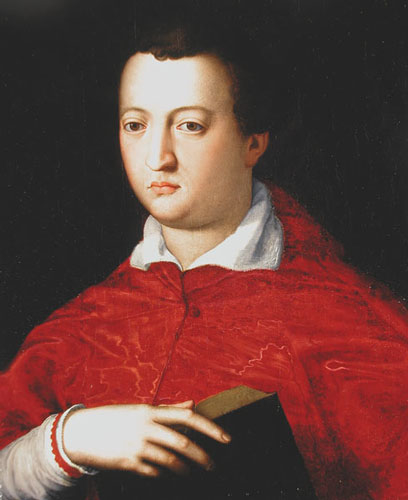
- Giovanni de' Medici
- Born: 29 September 1543; Florence, Republic of Florence
- Died: 20 November 1562 (aged 19); Livorno, Republic of Florence
- Burial: Medici Chapel
- House: House of Medici
- Father: Cosimo I
- Mother: Eleanor of Toledo
- Religion: Catholicism

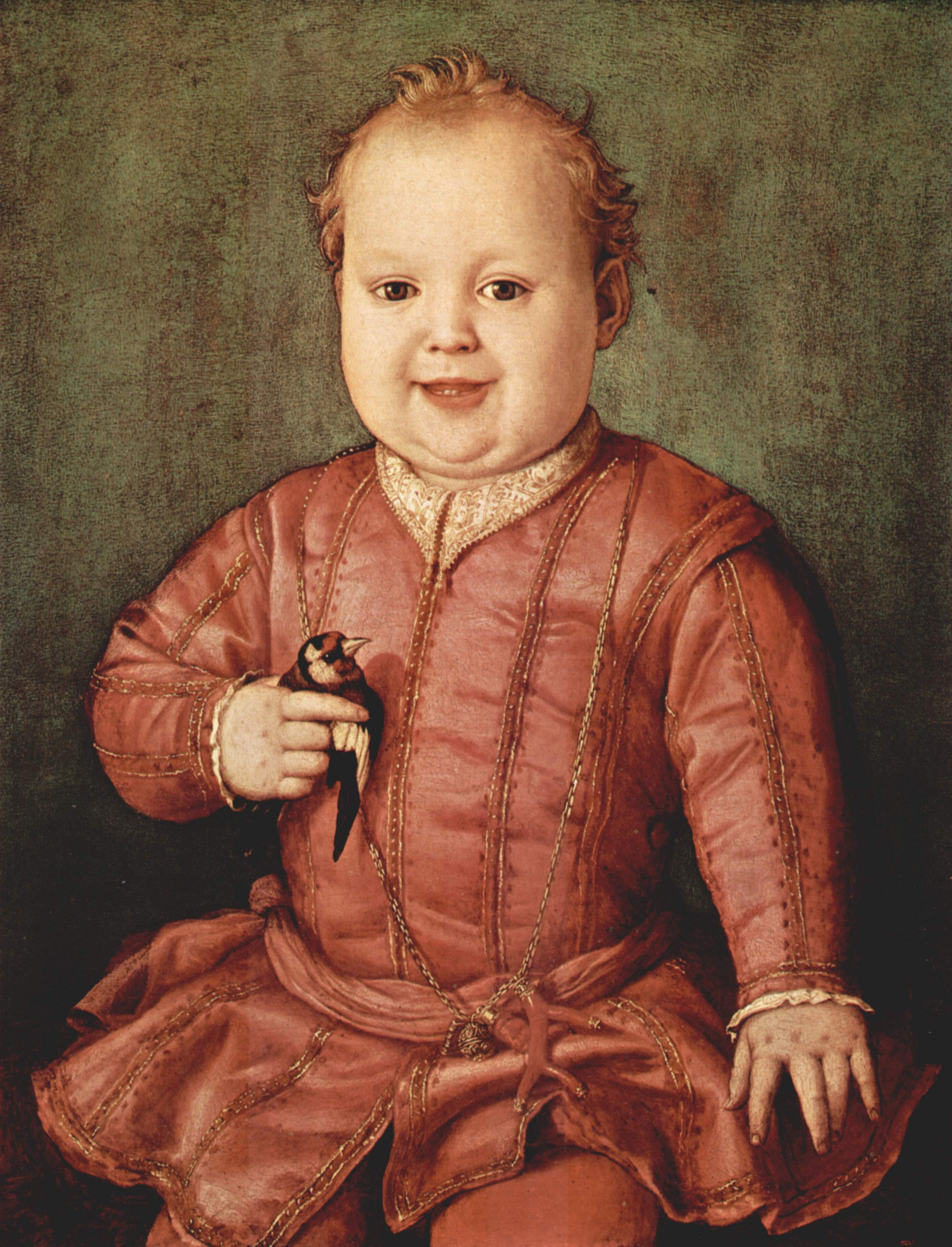
Agnolo Bronzino, Portrait of Giovanni de' Medici (c. 1545), Uffizi, Florence.

Giovanni di Cosimo I de' Medici (29 September 1543 – 20 November 1562), also known as Giovanni de' Medici the Younger, was an Italian cardinal.

== Early years ==
He was born in Florence, the second son of Cosimo I de' Medici, Grand Duke of Tuscany, and Eleanor of Toledo. While his elder brother Francesco went on to a political and military career, Giovanni had reserved for him the ecclesiastical career.

He was the subject of two famous portraits by Bronzino, one as an infant and another of some years later, together with Eleonora of Toledo (although the subject of the latter has been identified also as Francesco or Garzia).

Aged only sixteen, after having already been made Archbishop of Pisa, Giovanni was created cardinal of Santa Maria in Domnica, by Pope Pius IV in the consistory of 31 January 1560.

== Death ==
Probably already suffering from tuberculosis, Giovanni died in Livorno two years after he was made a cardinal, from an attack of malaria. His mother and his brother Garzia died of the same illness a few days after him.

Centuries after his death, a myth arose to the effect that Garzia had killed Giovanni, following a dispute in 1562. In turn, their father Cosimo was supposed to have killed Garzia in a rage with his own sword. However, exhumations in 1857 showed no signs of violence on the bodies and it was concluded that they had both died of malaria in 1562.

Cosimo had another son in 1563 whom he also named Giovanni (he is best known as Don Giovanni de' Medici).

== Ancestry ==
Ancestors of Giovanni de' Medici (cardinal)

8. Giovanni il Popolano
4. Giovanni delle Bande Nere
9. Caterina Sforza
2. Cosimo I de' Medici, Grand Duke of Tuscany
10. Jacopo Salviati
5. Maria Salviati
11. Lucrezia de' Medici
1. Giovanni de' Medici
12. Fadrique Álvarez de Toledo y Enríquez, 2nd Duke of Alba
6. Pedro de Toledo y Zúñiga
13. Isabel de Zúñiga y Pimentel
3. Eleanor of Toledo
14. Luis Pimentel y Pacheco, 1st Marquis of Villafranca del Bierzo
7. María Osorio y Pimentel, 2nd Marquise of Villafranca del Bierzo
15. Juana Osorio y Bazán, 1st Marquise of Villafranca del Bierzo

== Sources ==
- Catholic Hierarchy (David M. Cheney): Giovanni di Cosimo I de' Medici
- FIU.edu (Florida International University): The Cardinals of the Holy Roman Church (Salvador Miranda) - MEDICI, iuniore, Giovanni de'
- Dizionario biografico degli italiani, vol. 73, Roma, Istituto dell'Enciclopedia Italiana, 2009 (Paola Volpini): MEDICI, Giovanni de'
