= Leo Hebraeus =

Leo Hebraeus may refer to:

- Judah Leon Abravanel
- Gersonides
