= Abravanel =

Sephardic Jewish family claiming descent from David

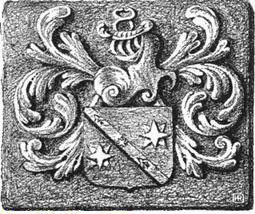
Coat of arms

The Abravanel family (Hebrew: אַבְּרַבַנְאֵל ʾAbravanʾēl or אַבַּרבְּנְאֵל ʾAbarbənʾēl), also spelled as Abarbanel, Abrabanel, Avravanel, Barbernell, or Barbanel – literally meaning Ab ("father") rabban ("of our master/teacher/rabbi") el ("of God") – is one of the oldest and most distinguished Jewish families. It first achieved prominence on the Iberian Peninsula during the Middle Ages. Its members claim to trace their origin to the biblical King David. Members of this family lived in Seville, Córdoba (Spanish province), Castile-Leon, and Calatayud. Seville is where its most prominent representative, Don Judah Abravanel, once dwelt.

Don Judah Abravanel was treasurer and tax collector under Sancho IV of Castile (1284–95) and Ferdinand IV of Castile (1295–1312). In 1310 he and other Jews guaranteed the loans made to the crown of Castile to finance the siege of Algeciras. He probably was almoxarife ("collector of revenues") of Castile. Don Judah Abravanel and his family later fled to Lisbon, Portugal, where they reverted to Judaism and filled important governmental posts. His son, Judah (died 1471), was in the financial service of the infante Ferdinand of Portugal, who by his will (1437) ordered the repayment to him of the vast sum of 506,000 reis blancs. Later, he was apparently in the service of the Duke of Braganza. His export business also brought him into trade relations with Flanders. He was the father of Don Isaac Abrabanel and grandfather of Judah Leon Abravanel and Samuel Abravanel.

Another eminent member of the family was Samuel of Seville, of whom Menahem ben Aaron ibn Zerah wrote that he was "intelligent, loved wise men, befriended them, was good to them and was eager to study whenever the stress of time permitted". He had great influence at the court of Castile. In 1388, he served as royal treasurer in Andalusia. During the anti-Jewish riots of 1391 he was forcibly converted to Christianity under the name of Juan Sánchez (de Sevilla) and was appointed comptroller in Castile. It is thought that a passage in a poem in the Cancionero de Baena, attributed to Alfonso Álvarez de Villasandino, refers to him.

Samuel Abravanel, Don Judah Abravanel's grandson, settled in Valencia, and Samuel's son, Judah (and perhaps Don Judah himself), left for Portugal. Isaac, the son of Judah, returned to Castile, where he lived until the time of the great expulsion of the Jews from Spain in 1492. Then, with his three sons, Judah, Joseph, and Samuel, Isaac went to Italy. Their descendants, as well as other members of the family who arrived later from the Iberian Peninsula, have lived in the Netherlands, England, Ireland, Germany, Turkey, Greece and American continent since the sixteenth century.

The high relative status of the family among the people of Iberia is indicated by a Ladino saying in Thessaloniki: Ya basta mi nombre ke es Abravanel, meaning "My name is enough, and my name is Abravanel."

== Claimed descent from King David ==
Don Isaac Abravanel wrote that his family claimed descent from King David.

== Notable Abravanels ==
Several of the more prominent members of this family include:

- Judah Abravanel was a receiver of customs at Seville, Spain, in 1310. He rendered substantial service to the grandees of Castile. The infante Don Pedro, in his will, dated from Seville, May 9, 1317, ordered that Judah be paid: (1) 15,000 maravedis for clothes delivered; (2) 30,000 maravedis as part of a personal debt, at the same time requesting Judah to release him from paying the rest. Judah had been in great favor with King Alfonso the Wise, with whom he once had a conversation regarding Judaism.
  - Samuel Abravanel was the son of Judah Abravanel of Seville. He settled in Castile and became a patron of learning. He supported the scholar Menahem ben Zerah and had him elected rabbi of Toledo. As a mark of his gratitude, Menahem dedicated to Abravanel his work Ẓedah la-Derek (Provision for the Journey). During the persecution of 1391 he submitted to Christianity and was baptized, according to Zacuto, Juan of Seville. He soon, however, returned to Judaism.
- Don Isaac Abravanel, also Isaac ben Judah Abravanel or Abarbanel (1437–1508) was born in Lisbon, Portugal. He was a Jewish statesman, philosopher, Bible commentator, and financier.
  - Judah Leon Abravanel, also Leon Hebreo, Leone Ebreo or Leo Hebraeus (c. 1460 – c. 1535), was a European Jewish physician, poet and philosopher, author of the "Dialogues of Love", the eldest son of Don Isaac Abravanel.
  - Joseph Abravanel (Lisbon, 1471 – c. 1552), son of Don Isaac Abravanel, was a physician and scholar. He lived in Venice and later in Ferrara, and enjoyed a great reputation.
    - Isaac Abravanel II (died 1573) was son of Joseph Abravanel and grandson of the Bible-commentator. He lived in Ferrara.
  - Samuel Abravanel (Lisbon, 1473 – Ferrara, 1551) was the youngest son of Isaac Abravanel, and the grandson of Judah. His father sent him to Salonica to pursue his Talmudic studies, where he became the pupil of Joseph Fasi. He lived in Naples and was employed as financier by the viceroy Don Pedro de Toledo. Samuel was a patron of Jewish learning. His house was a favorite resort for Jewish and Christian scholars. The Portuguese refugee David ben Yachya, whom Samuel succeeded in placing as rabbi in Naples, and the Baruch of Benevento, a Kabbalist, were his close friends. Following in the footsteps of his father, and aided by his wife, Samuel was always ready to defend his fellow Jews. When Charles V issued an edict to expel the Jews from Naples, Benvenida, with the assistance of Leonora, intervened in their behalf so effectively that the decree was revoked. But several years later, when Charles V ordered the Jews either to leave the land or to wear the badge, the Abravanels settled in Ferrara, where Samuel died 1551, and Benvenida three years later.
- Yona Abravanel (died 1667) was a poet who lived in Amsterdam in the seventeenth century. He was the son of the physician Joseph Abravanel, and a nephew of Manasseh ben Israel. He wrote, in Portuguese, Elegio em Louvar da Nova Yesiba, instituido por o Senhor Yshac Pereira, de que he Ros Yesiba o Senhor Haham Menasse ben Israel (Elegy in Praise of New Yesiba, instituted by Lord Yshac Pereira, the Ros Yesiba of which is Lord Haham Menasse ben Israel, Amsterdam, 1644). He also wrote elegies upon the martyrs Isaac de Castro Tartas (1647) and the Bernals (1655). After 1630, with Dr. Ephraim Bueno, he published ritualistic works and Psalterio de David... transladado con toda fidelidad (Psalterio of David... translated with full fidelity, Amsterdam, 1644).
- Maurice Abravanel (b. 1903 in Saloniki, Greece – d. 1993 in Salt Lake City, Utah) was raised in Lausanne, Switzerland and, after emigrating to the USA, became the conductor of the Utah Symphony Orchestra.
- Senor Abravanel, better known as Silvio Santos (b. December 12, 1930 - d. August 17, 2024), a well-known Brazilian television host and owner of the Sistema Brasileiro de Televisão conglomerate.
- Patricia Abravanel, Brazilian TV hostess, producer and businesswoman
- Tiago Abravanel, Brazilian actor, voice actor and singer
- Yuri A. Barbanel, was a distinguished Soviet/Russian scientist in the field of physical chemistry, born in 1935.
- The family name exists in the forms "Barbanel", "Voronel", "Abraben" and "Arnell".
- Boris Pasternak, the Russian 20th-century author of Dr. Zhivago, whose family claimed to be descended from Isaac Abravanel.

== See also ==
- Abravanel Hall
- Davidic line
- Benveniste
- Sephardi
- Pinkas haKehilot
- 1632 series which has fictional members of the Abrabanel family with one (Rebecca) a central character

== Notes ==
- (in Portuguese) Usque, Samuel, Consolaçam as Tribulaçoẽs de Ysrael (Ferrara, 1553; 2d ed. Amsterdam, n.d.)
- (in German) Grätz, Heinrich, Geschichte der Juden, ix 47 et seq., 327 et seq.
- (in German) Kayserling, Meyer, Geschichte der Juden in Portugal, p. 264
- (in German) —, Die Jüdischen Frauen, pp. 77 et seq.
- Max Nordau, the important writer and vice-president of the Zionist movement alongside Theodor Hertlz, belonged to the Abravanel family, as stated in his biography by his daughters Maxa and Anna Nordau. In that book, the Abravanel coat of arms is displayed ("Max Nordau, a Biography" by Maxa and Anna Nordau. New York 1943, translated from the French). In this book "Frontispice", don Isaac Abravanel from the time of Ferdinand and Isabella in Spain is alluded to as their illustrious ancestor. Nordau spoke Spanish from familial tradition (the Sefardic modality).
