= Garzia de' Medici =

Italian noble

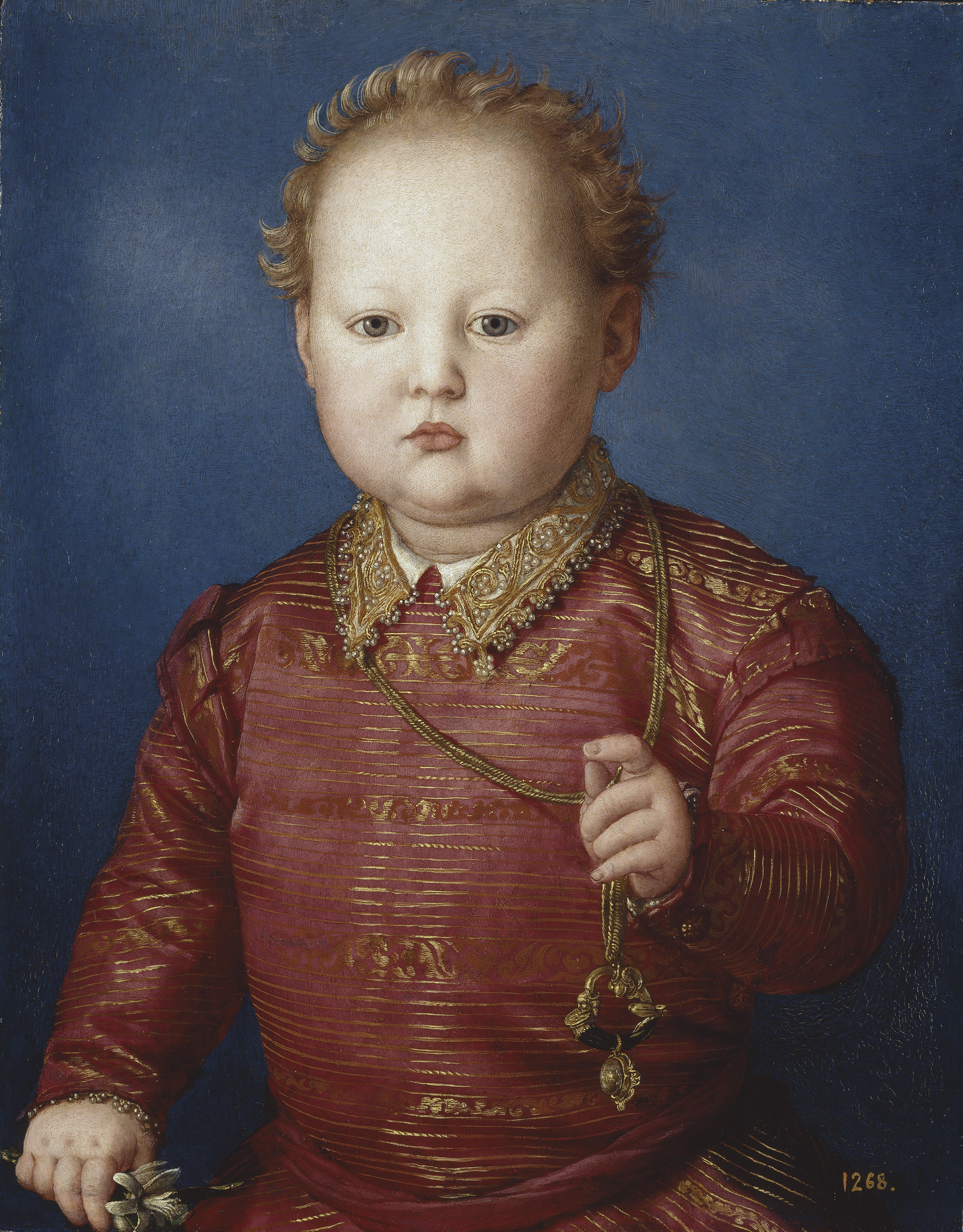
- Garzia by Bronzino
- Born: 5 July 1547; Florence
- Died: 6 December 1562 (aged 15)
- Burial: Medici Chapel
- House: House of Medici
- Father: Cosimo I
- Mother: Eleanor of Toledo

Garzia de' Medici (July 5, 1547 – December 6, 1562) was the son of Cosimo I de' Medici, Grand Duke of Tuscany, and Eleanor of Toledo. He was the subject of a famous painting by Bronzino when he was an infant. He was born in Florence and died of malaria along with his mother while traveling to Pisa, a few days after his brother, Cardinal Giovanni, also died of the disease.

== Early years ==
Born in Florence, he was the son of Cosimo I de' Medici, Grand Duke of Tuscany, and Eleanor of Toledo. His parents had planned for him a military career, and at only 13 years old he had been named Honorary Commander and Supreme Commander of the Tuscan galleys.

== Malaria and death ==
In 1562, he accompanied his father and brothers Giovanni and Ferdinando, to the Tuscan coast to embark to Spain, where the eldest son Francesco lived. But his mother Eleanor and the children contracted malaria, and all except Ferdinando died in a few weeks.

Many sudden deaths in the family of the Duke immediately aroused the suspicions of the family, who also attended the Council of Trent. Several sources confirm, however, that during the period there was a violent flu epidemic.

Centuries after his death, a myth arose saying that Garzia had murdered his brother, Giovanni, following a dispute in 1562. In turn, his father Cosimo, furious, killed Garzia with his own sword. However, modern exhumations showed no signs of violence on the bodies and they were found to have died together of malaria in 1562.

== Ancestry ==
Ancestors of Garzia de' Medici

16. Pierfrancesco di Lorenzo de' Medici
8. Giovanni di Pierfrancesco de' Medici
17. Laudomia Acciaiuoli
4. Ludovico di Giovanni de' Medici
18. Galeazzo Maria Sforza
9. Caterina Sforza
19. Lucrezia Landriani
2. Cosimo I de' Medici, Grand Duke of Tuscany
20. Giovanni Salviati
10. Jacopo Salviati
21. Maddalena Gondi
5. Maria Salviati
22. Lorenzo de' Medici
11. Lucrezia de' Medici
23. Clarice Orsini
1. Garzia de' Medici
24. García Álvarez de Toledo y Carrillo
12. Fadrique Álvarez de Toledo y Enríquez de Guzmán
25. María Enríquez de Toledo y Guzmán
6. Pedro Álvarez de Toledo y Zúñiga
26. Álvaro de Zúñiga y Guzmán (pt)
13. Isabel de Zúñiga y Pimentel
27. Leonor Pimentel y Zúñiga
3. Eleanor of Toledo
28. Rodrigo Pimentel y Quiñones
14. Luis Pimentel y Pacheco
29. María Luisa Pacheco y Portocarrero
7. María Osorio y Pimentel
30. Pedro Osorio y Fernández
15. Juana Osorio y Bazán
31. María Bazán y Quiñones
