= Portrait of Eleanor of Toledo =

1540s painting by Bronzino

Portrait of Eleanor of Toledo and Her Son
- Eleonora di Toledo col figlio Giovanni (Italian)
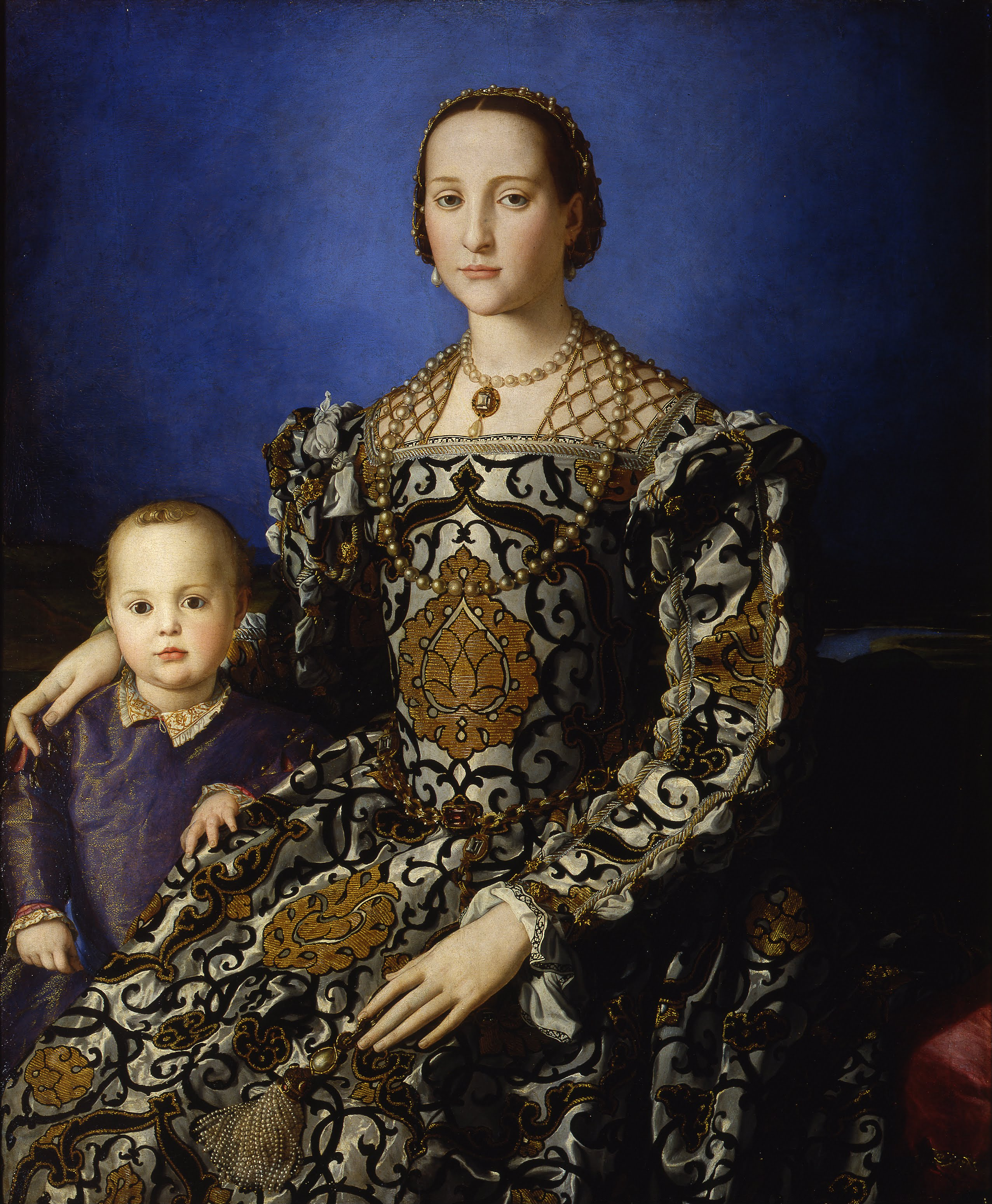
- Artist: Bronzino
- Year: circa 1545
- Type: Oil on panel
- Dimensions: 115 cm × 96 cm (45 in × 38 in)
- Location: Uffizi; Florence
- Website: https://www.uffizi.it/en/artworks/eleonora-di-toledo

The painting, Portrait of Eleanor of Toledo and Her Son Giovanni, was painted c. 1545 by Agnolo di Cosimo, known as Bronzino. The painting is of Eleonora di Toledo, the Duchess of Florence, and her son Giovanni. This portrait uses the position of the two and their clothing to exemplify her power, fertility, and the legacy of the Medici family. It is housed in the Uffizi Gallery of Florence, Italy and is considered one of the preeminent examples of Mannerist portraiture.

== History ==
=== Medici Family ===
Duke Cosimo I de' Medici (1519–1574) and his Spanish wife, Duchess Eleonora di Toledo (1522–1562), were Bronzino's most famous and longstanding patrons. Emperor Charles V granted the Ducal title on Cosimo I de' Medici following the assassination of Alessandro de' Medici in 1537. Despite their wealth and connections, the Medici were merchant bankers whose political influence emerged from their clever business practices. They did not gain their wealth from being royalty. Cosimo I de' Medici commissioned numerous works of art and architectural projects in an effort to enhance Florence's beauty and position himself as a powerful leader, dynasty securer, and educated, devout individual. In 1539, Cosimo married the Spanish Eleonora di Toledo, the daughter of the viceroy of Naples, Don Pedro de Toledo.

=== Eleonora di Medici ===
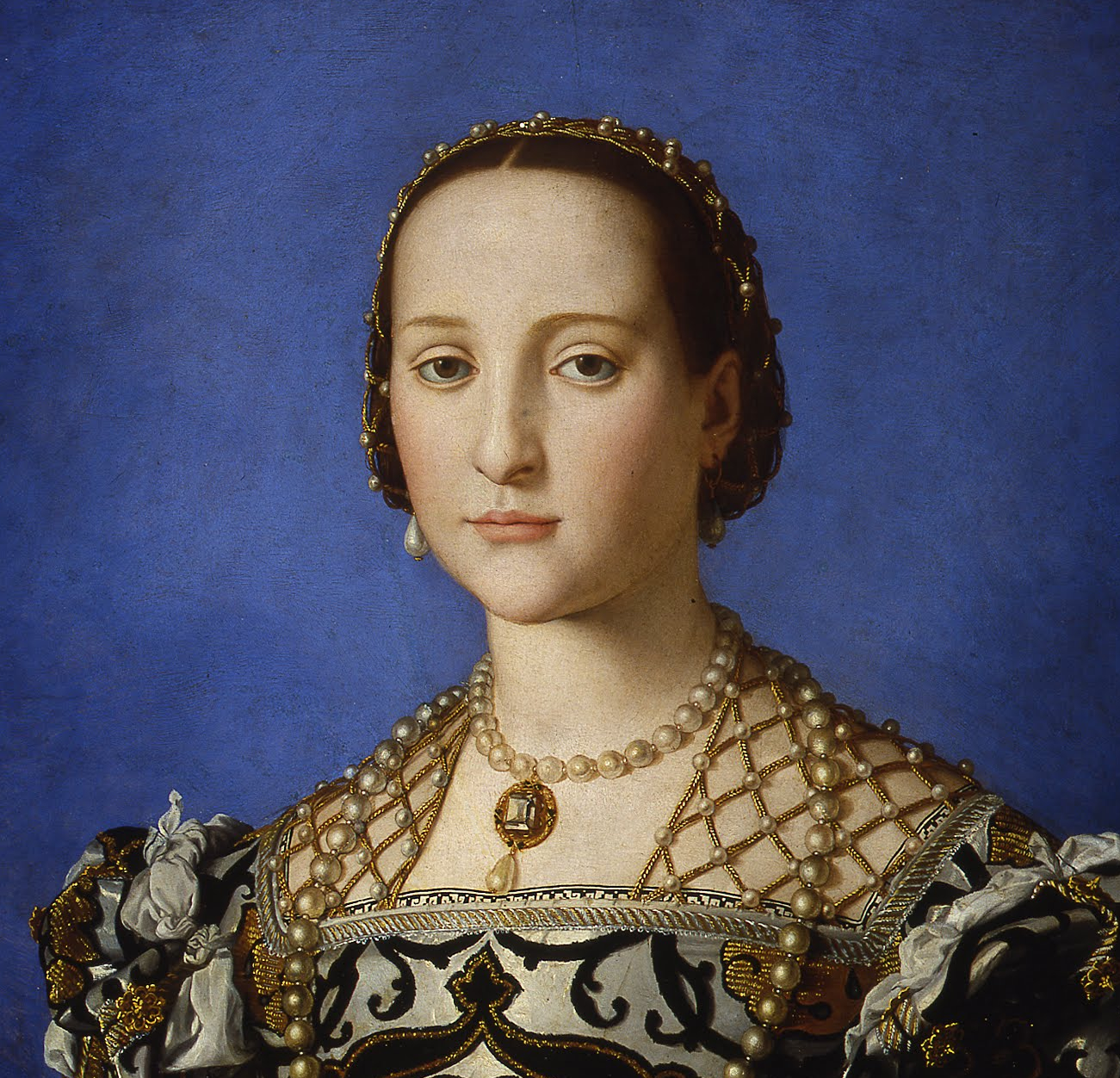
Detail of Eleonora

In 1522, Eleonora was born in Spain. Eleonora, her mother Doña María Osorio y Pimentel, and her siblings joined her father, Don Pedro de Toledo, at the luxurious court of Naples in 1534. Eleonora was an attractive prospect for marriage, having been born into Spanish aristocracy and growing up in a royal court with a father who was close to the Holy Roman Emperor. She married Cosimo I de' Medici five years later when she was seventeen years old. Eleonora's sharp economic ability and imperial connections benefited Cosimo's new government, while her eleven children guaranteed the new Medici family bloodline. Being the Duchess of Florence, Eleonora would take her husbands place in governing while he was away handling situations regarding war or diplomacy. She borrowed money from the state in both her name and jointly with Cosimo, confirming that Eleonora's money was extremely paramount regarding how the city-state of Florence became so successful. Along with the assistance of her advisors, Eleonora proved to everyone she was a well-adjusted Duchess. Eleonora played a key role in shaping her position as a consort into both a matriarchal and political position. Because of her role as “first lady,” she is often regarded as the first modern woman.

The public opinion of Eleonora was split between those who viewed her as a woman who was hard to please as she enjoyed spending most of her time at the Medici rural homes as well as gambling, while others perceived her to be a Florentine monarch who refused to learn Italian and was overwhelmingly a devout Spaniard. Regardless of these opinions, Eleonora's birth to her children and her transfer of wealth was unquestionably beneficial to the people of Florence. In fact, it was this power that she held that Bronzino portrays in the painting Portrait of Eleonora of Toledo and her Son Giovanni.

=== Agnolo di Cosimo, a.k.a. Bronzino ===
According to Vasari, Bronzino first gained recognition for his artistic skills at Cosimo and Eleonora's wedding on July 6, 1539, when he painted two images from the history of the Medici family that were used as decoration for the wedding celebration. Cosimo was drawn to these wedding decorations, which led him to hire Bronzino to decorate a chapel in the Ducal Palace for Eleonora. Bronzino created both private and public portraits of the Duke, Duchess, and their kids in addition to religious and devotional pieces, allegories, and the chapel of Eleonora, which was his first significant commission for the Ducal union. The paintings of the Medici children were important not only for the commemoration of the family, but also served as memorials to the children that Cosimo and Eleonora lost at a young age. For almost 25 years, Bronzino was the court painter for the Medici family. During his career he was known as a talented artist by coworkers, friends, and even competitors, who had compared him to the Apollo and Apelles of the Renaissance. Bronzino's most well-known portrait of the Medici family is the Portrait of Eleonora of Toledo and her Son Giovanni.

== Visual details ==
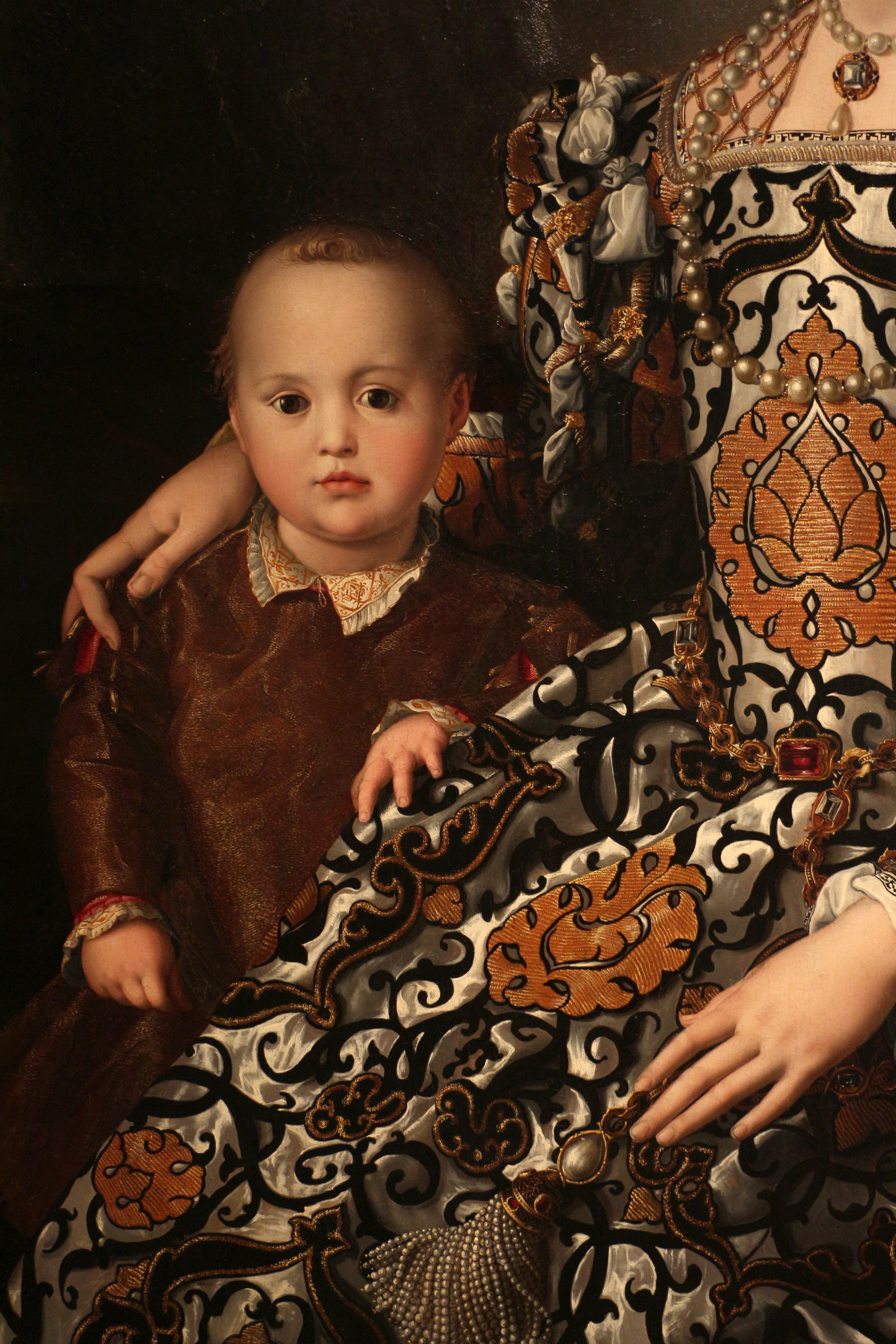
Detail of Giovanni

The painting depicts Eleonora of Toledo sitting with her hand resting on the shoulder of her son Giovanni. The painting is the first known state-commissioned portrait to include the ruler's heir. This gesture referred to her role as mother exemplifying fertility, immortality, divine protection, and the terrestrial power of the elite. Eleonora's fecundity, purity, legacy, and the Medici supremacy is seen through many motifs in this portrait of her and her son Giovanni. Bronzino used the powers of wealth and fertility of Eleonora to idealize her in the extravagantly decorated dress, which is the most attention seeking part of the portrait. On Eleonora's right is her son Giovanni, dressed in a high-priced outfit. Giovanni's baby fat-filled face is full and gleaming, a testament for his health and the potential promise that he will grow into being a ruler for the Medici family. Giovanni was the second son of Eleonora and Cosimo, but no portraits are known to exist of Francesco, their first son. The healthy image of the pair in this portrait serves as a reminder for the future leaders of the Medici's and the exciting future of Florence.

Giovanni and Eleonora are sitting against radiating royal blue background that has a lighter value around Eleonora's head. This lighter value can create an image of a halo around her head. The halo and the position of the pair sitting together can allude to the iconography of the Madonna and Child, a popular image throughout the Renaissance. In this portrait, Eleonora looks unemotional, reflecting the sober formality of Eleonora's native Spanish Court, without the warmth typically expected of a portrait of mother and child. She is depicted as not showing affection to her child, while also giving the impression that she is looking down on the viewer. Such distancing is typical of the Mannerist school's rejection of naturalism and the difference in the way secular and non-secular subjects are portrayed.

=== Clothing ===
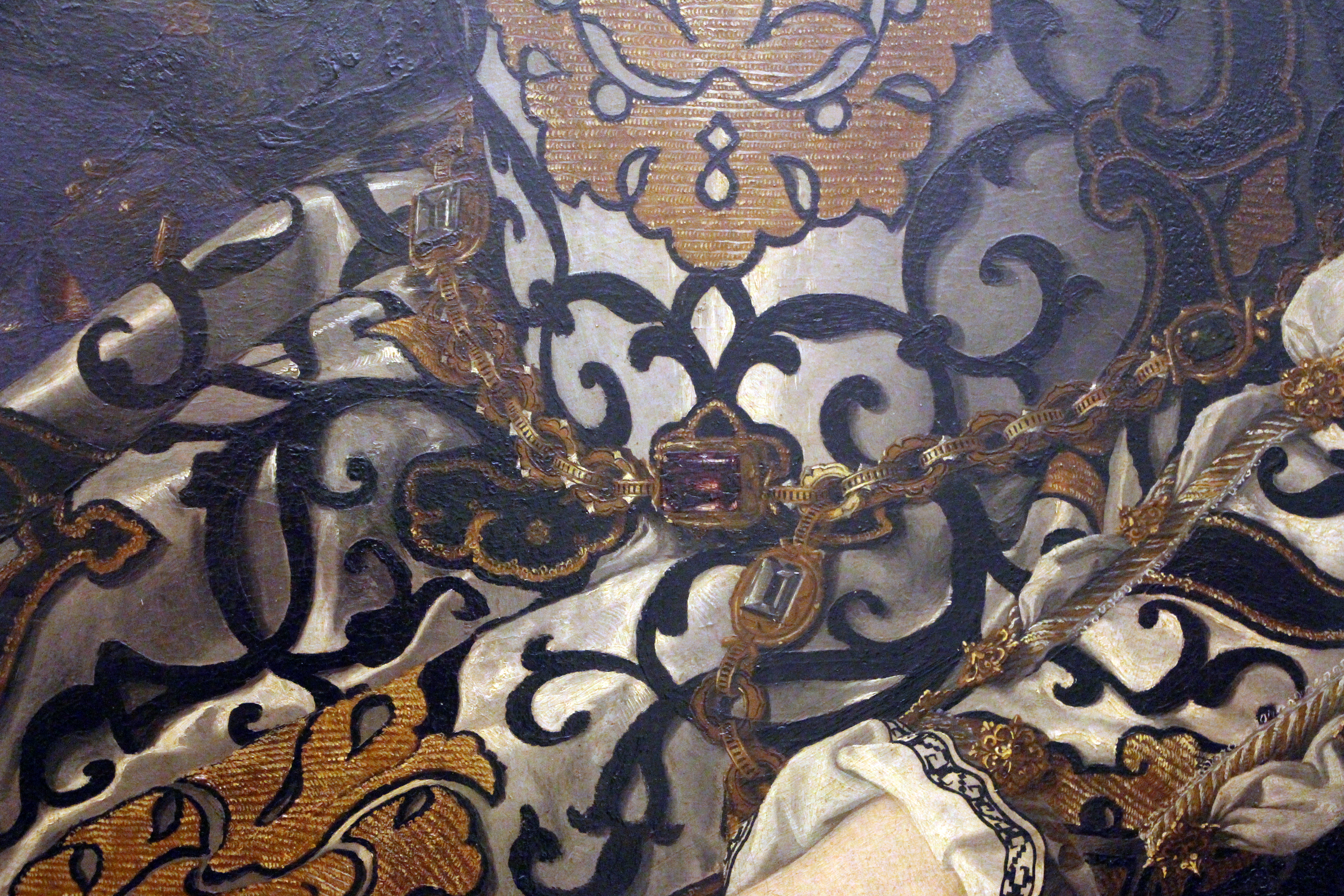
Detail of gold belt

Eleonora's gown of elaborate brocaded velvet, with its massed bouclé effects of gold weft loops in the style called riccio sopra riccio (loop over loop), is painstakingly replicated. The pomegranate motif design, included in Eleonora's dress, has a long history that had originated in the Middle East and became a popular design around the world by the sixteenth century. Using a damask with a pomegranate motif was very common, and considered one of Florence's most successful products. It was used for interior furniture and decoration, ceremonial vestments as well as regular garments. This pomegranate pattern is on top of a white background surrounded by black velvet volutes. The golden belt, decorated with jewels and beads with a tassel, may have been made by the goldsmith Benvenuto Cellini.

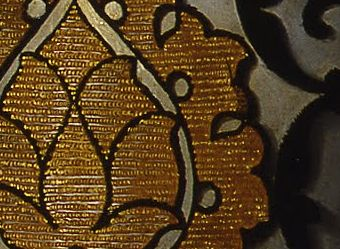
Detail of the brocaded velvet

Through Bronzino, this portrait became a representative of Eleonora as the economic success of Florence and its textile industry as well as Cosimo's wife. Bronzino's talent is obvious in his hand at creating marvelous textures. Bronzino's delicate hand exemplifies the elegance and refinement of Mannerist art in this portrait. The dress that Eleonora is wearing constitutes the wealth she brought with her from Spain due to the majority of her dowry being Spanish textiles. This painting also shows that Eleonora was not abiding by the Florentine sumptuary laws, or laws limiting any member of all social classes from spending too much money on extravagant garments and objects, based on the wealth that is displayed through her dress and accessories. Eleonora's beautiful and elaborate dress also shows how Spanish influence was affecting fashion. The neckline has moved upward in contrast to the garments of the early years of the century. Her bodice constricts her chest into an unnatural cylinder, which, although undoubtedly uncomfortable, presents an ideal surface for the display of the magnificent pomegranate pattern of the fabric. This specific dress was not a part of Eleonora's everyday wardrobe and was most likely chosen as a specific dress to admire her elegance.

=== Academic discussion on the fabric ===
According to those who saw the dress in person, the main fabric is satin. The eyewitnesses identifying the undergown of Eleonora's dress as velvet indicates that they knew the differences between the two fabrics, satin and velvet. These eyewitnesses also identified the brocading as embroidery. The differences between these two are harder to distinguish, for embroidery is stitched onto the fabric and brocades are woven into the fabric. Because of this distinction, the fabric is most likely a form of satin that was made from one warp-faced weave and one weft-faced weave. This process can create a fabric with patterned areas that can be super glossy or lightly glossy. The pomegranate damask is then brocaded into the area of the fabric that is patterned.

In contrast, the textile industry of the sixteenth century would suggest that Eleonora's dress was manufactured domestically with silk. Due to an increase in production during this era, Cosimo became increasingly involved with this economy and revived the Florentine silk industry that had fallen before his reign. In Florence, silk became to replace the use of wools and laws came into place to ban other popular silks that were being imported. Cosimo had an attitude of protector for the guilds he ruled over, including the silk guild, and therefore would most likely direct Bronzino to paint his wife in those Florentine silks. It is likely that Eleonora herself commissioned the fabric to resemble the brocaded pomegranate pattern in gold due to this pattern being very popular in Spain. By using Florentine silk, Eleonora would be showing her support of the silk industry and their ability to create products as luxurious as those in Spain, and she would also be gaining local support for her as the new Duchess, even with her "suspicious" Spanish background.
