= Samuel Abravanel =

Samuel Abravanel HaNasi also spelt Abarbanel (1473-1551) was a prominent Sephardic-Italian financier, academic, and supporter of Italian Jewry. He is best known as the chief financier of viceroy Don Pedro de Toledo.

== Biography ==
Born in Lisbon, Portugal, into the Abravanel family, Samuel was the youngest of three sons; his father Isaac Abarbanel was a notable Portuguese Jew. In his early years, his father sent him to Salonica to pursue his Talmudic studies where he became the pupil of Joseph Nasi. He later moved to Naples, Italy, where he was employed as the chief financier of viceroy Don Pedro de Toledo. It was during this time that Samuel amassed a great fortune, becoming richer than anyone in his immediate family.

Samuel later married his first cousin Benvenida Abrabanel, however, the two had to move to Ferrara in 1541 when the Neapolitan government banned Jews from the city. It was in Ferrara that the couple began to support several Jewish institutions. Their house became a favorite resort for Jewish and Christian scholars alike, such as David ben Yahya and Baruch of Benevento. The poet Samuel Usque famously said that Samuel [Abravanel] deserved the surname "Tremegisto," meaning, "thrice great": because Samuel was great in scholarship, great in name (ancestry), and great in wealth. Stating that "he generously employs his wealth in promoting the welfare of his coreligionists. He enables many orphans to marry, supports the needy, and endeavors strenuously to free captives so that in him are combined all the great qualities which make one fitted for the gift of prophecy." Samuel died in 1551 in Ferrara.
