= Baruch of Benevento =

Italian rabbi

Baruch of Benevento was an Italian Jewish Cabalist in Naples, during the first half of the 16th century.

He was the teacher of Cardinal Ægidius of Viterbo and of Johann Albrecht Widmanstadt in the Zohar and other cabalistic works, and lectured on these subjects in the house of Samuel Abravanel. In a note at the end of one of his manuscripts, Widmanstadt says: "Eodem tempore (MDXLI.) audivi Baruch Beneventanum optimum cabalistam, qui primus libros Zoharis per Ægidium Viterbiensem Cardinalem in Christianos vulgavit."

Graetz, Perles, and others have taken this to mean that Baruch translated the Zohar, or parts of it, into Latin; but Steinschneider has remarked that it means nothing more than that he made the Zohar known to Christian scholars.
