= Giles of Viterbo =

Roman Catholic theologian and scholar

His Eminence Giles Antonini O.E.S.A.
- Cardinal Priest of San Marcello al Corso
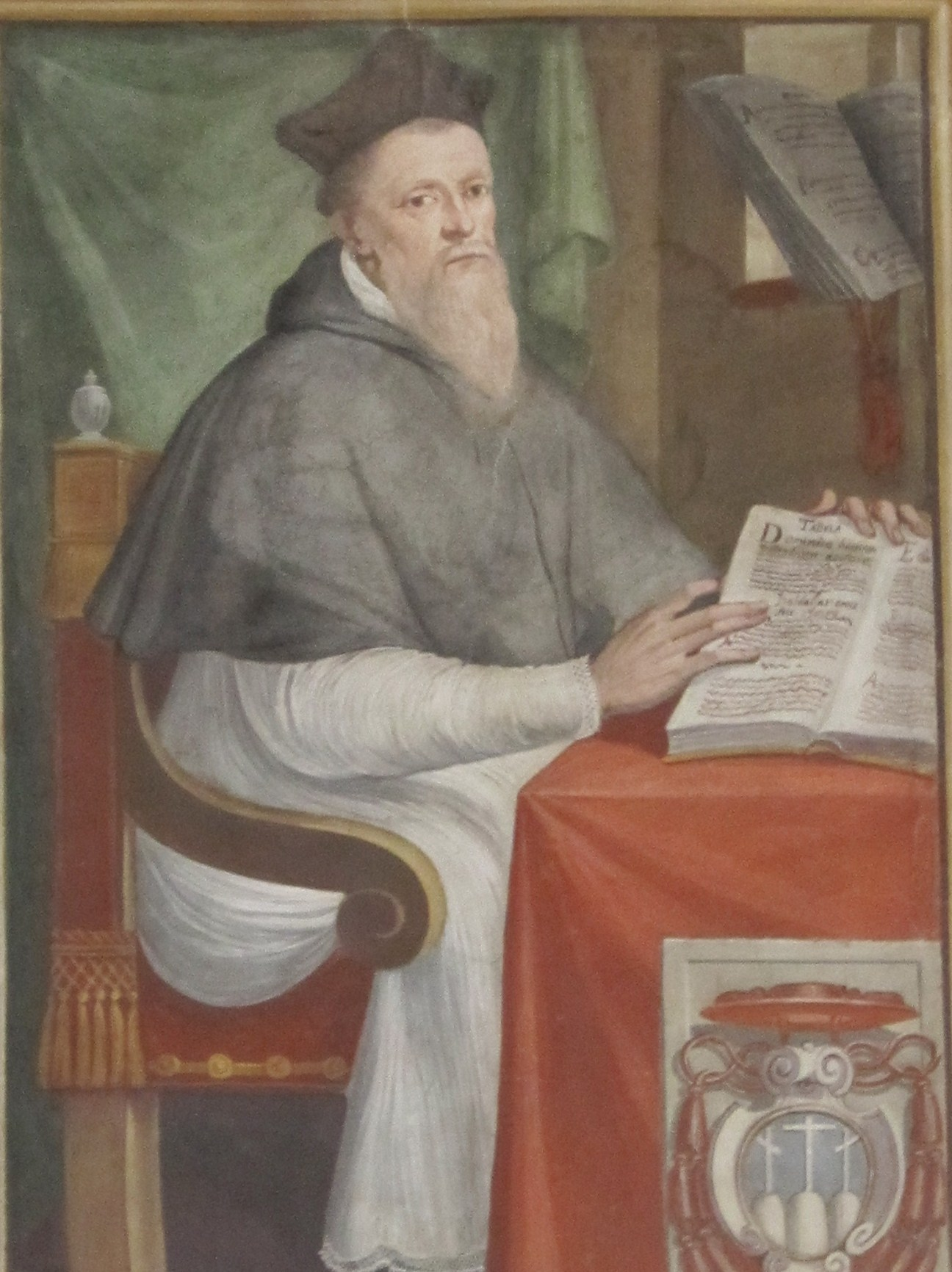
- Cardinal Bishop Giles of Viterbo, 17th-century fresco in the Priori Palace, Viterbo, Italy.
- Province: Holy See
- Diocese: Bishop of Viterbo e Tuscania
- Installed: 2 December 1523
- Term ended: 12 November 1532
- Predecessor: Ottaviano Visconti Riario
- Successor: Giampietro Grassi
- Other posts: Prior General of the Order of St. Augustine (June 1507 – February 1519); Latin Patriarch of Jerusalem (8 August 1524 – 19 December 1530); Bishop of Lanciano (10 April 1532 – 12 November 1532)

Orders
- Ordination: c. 1495
- Consecration: December 1523
- Created cardinal: 1 July 1517
- Rank: Cardinal Priest

Personal details
- Born: unknown 1472 Viterbo, Papal States
- Died: 12 November 1532 (aged 59–60) Rome, Papal States
- Buried: Basilica of Sant'Agostino, Rome, Italy
- Parents: Lorenzo Antonini & Maria del Testa

Giles Antonini O.E.S.A. commonly referred to as Giles of Viterbo (Latin: Ægidius Viterbensis, Italian: Egidio da Viterbo), was a 16th-century Italian Augustinian prelate, reforming theologian, orator, humanist and poet who served as Bishop of Viterbo e Tuscania. He was made a cardinal in 1517.

== Early life ==
Antonini was born to humble parents and his given name is not known; his father was Lorenzo Antonini, of Canepina, near Viterbo, and his mother, Maria del Testa. He entered the Order of St. Augustine in June 1488, at which time he was given the name Giles. He began a course of studies at priories of the Order in Ameria, Padua, Istria, Florence and Rome, studying philosophy, and later made a doctor of theology. He became Vicar General of the Order in 1506. Upon the death of the Prior General, he was elected as his successor at three successive General Chapters of the Order: in 1507, 1511 and 1515, with the patronage of Pope Julius II.

He was a noted preacher, presiding at several papal services of Pope Alexander VI. He also travelled widely, due to his responsibilities as head of the Order. This allowed him to be in touch with leading intellectual figures of the period, with whom he formed working collaborations. One friend, Giovanni Pontano, dedicated a work to him, entitled Ægidius. He is famous in ecclesiastical history for the boldness and earnestness of the discourse which he delivered at the opening of the Fifth Lateran Council, held in 1512, at the Lateran Palace.

== Cardinal ==
Following his service to his Order, Antonini was elevated to the rank of cardinal by Pope Leo X in the consistory of 1 July 1517, and given the titular church of San Bartolomeo all'Isola, but he immediately had the appointment changed to the Church of San Matteo in Via Merulana. He resigned the office of Prior General in February 1519, and Pope Leo assigned him to several sees in succession, employed him as legate on important missions, notably to Charles of Spain, soon to become Holy Roman Emperor Charles V.

His zeal for the genuine reformation of conditions in the Catholic Church prompted him to present Pope Adrian VI with a promemoria. He was given the title of Latin Patriarch of Constantinople in 1524. When the riotous soldiers of Charles V sacked Rome in 1527, Antonini's extensive library was destroyed, and he spent the next year living in exile in Padua. He requested the transfer of his titular church to the Church of San Marcello al Corso in 1530. He was universally esteemed as a learned and virtuous member of the great pontifical senate, and many deemed him destined to succeed Pope Clement VII.

Antonini died in Rome and was buried in the Basilica of Sant'Agostino.

== Christian Kabbalist ==
Antonini knew Marsilio Ficino from a visit to Florence, and he was familiar with Pico della Mirandola's interpretations of the Kabbalah. His interest in the Talmud led him into correspondence with Johannes Reuchlin.

He is known in Jewish history for taking in as patron the grammarian Elia Levita, who helped the cardinal's knowledge of Hebrew and Aramaic. When the turmoil of war drove Levita from Padua to Rome, he was welcomed at the palace of the cardinal with his family, where he was supported and lived for more than ten years. While there, Levita became the foremost tutor of Christian notables in Hebrew lore. The first edition of Levita's Baḥur is dedicated to Antonini, who introduced Levita to classical scholarship and the Greek language. This enabled him to utilize Greek in his Hebrew lexicographic labours, a debt acknowledged by Levita, who dedicated his Concordance in 1521 to the cardinal.

Antonini's main motive was to penetrate the mysteries of the Kabbalah. He belonged to the group of sixteenth-century Christian kabbalists, including Johann Reuchlin and Pico della Mirandola. They believed that Jewish mysticism, particularly the Zohar, contained incontrovertible testimony to the truth of the Christian religion. During Reuchlin's conflict with the obscurantists, concerning the preservation of Jewish books, the cardinal wrote to his friend in 1516: "While we labour on thy behalf, we defend not thee, but the law; not the Talmud, but the Church."

He also engaged another Jewish scholar, Baruch di Benevento, to translate the Zohar for him. Benevento may also have been partly responsible for the numerous kabbalistic translations and treatises which appeared under the name of Ægidius. The cardinal was a collector of Hebrew manuscripts, many of which are still at the Bavarian State Library, bearing both faint traces of his signature and brief Latin annotations.

In the Biblioteca Angelica at Rome, an old Hebrew manuscript is extant, which was given to Antonini by Pope Leo X. The richly illuminated manuscript (Ms. Or 72), produced in the 14th century, contains Biblical texts in Hebrew, grammatical and rabbinic works. The British Museum contains a copy of Makiri and the Midrash on the minor Prophets, written for the cardinal at Tivoli, in the year 1514, by Johanan ben Jacob Sarkuse. The study of Jewish literature led the cardinal to a friendly interest in the Jews themselves, which he manifested both in his energetic encouragement of Reuchlin, and a vain attempt working with cardinal Geronimo de Ghinucci in 1531 to prevent the issue of the papal edict authorizing the introduction of the Inquisition against the Maranos.

== Works ==
Antonini was a profound student of the Scriptures and a good scholar in Greek as well as Hebrew. Giovanni Pontano dedicated to him one of his Dialoghi.

The writings commonly attributed to Antonini are numerous. Most of them are to be found in manuscript form in the Bibliothèque Nationale, Paris, but their authenticity is still to be established. Aside from minor works on the Hebrew language, the majority by far are of a cabalistic nature. There is scarcely a classic of Jewish medieval mysticism that he has not translated, annotated, or commented upon. Among these works may be mentioned the Zohar.

Only a few of Antonini's writings have been printed in the third volume of the Collectio Novissima of Martène. When urged by Pope Clement VII to publish his works, he is said, by the Augustinian historian, Friar Tomás de Herrera, O.E.S.A., to have replied that he feared to contradict famous and holy men by his exposition of Scripture. The Pope replied that human respect should not deter him; it was quite permissible to preach and write what was contrary to the opinions of others, provided one did not depart from the truth and from the common tradition of the Church.

Antonini's major original work is a historical treatise: Historia viginti sæculorum per totidem psalmos conscripta. It deals in a philosophical-historical way with the history of the world before and after the birth of Christ, is valuable for the history of its own time, and offers a certain analogy with Bossuet's famous Discours sur l'histoire universelle.

The six books of Antonini's important correspondence (1497–1523) concerning the affairs of his Order, much of which is addressed to Friar Gabriel of Venice, his successor as Prior General, are preserved in Rome in the Biblioteca Angelica. Cardinal Joseph Hergenröther, a leading Church historian of the 19th century, praised particularly the circular letter in which Antonini made known (27 February 1519), his resignation of the office of Prior General of the Augustinian friars.

Other of Antonini's known works are a commentary on the first book of the Sentences of Peter Lombard, three Eclogae Sacrae, a dictionary of Hebrew roots, a Libellus de ecclesiae incremento, a Liber dialogorum, and an Informatio pro sedis apostolicae auctoritate contra Lutheranam sectam.

In 1518, Juan Gabriel of Teruel (formerly known as Ali Alayzar), a Muslim convert to Christianity, prepared a Latin translation of the Quran for Giles of Viterbo, who had commissioned the translation for the purpose of converting Muslims to Christianity. Leo Africanus, a Muslim convert who was a godson of Giles of Viterbo, revised the translation in 1525. Surviving manuscripts of the translation are Cambridge MS Mm. v. 26 (C) and Milan MS D 100 inf. (M). MS D 100 Inf was copied by Scottish scholar David Colville in 1621, from a manuscript at the library of El Escorial in Spain. Colville later brought the manuscript to Milan. Today, it is archived at the Biblioteca Ambrosiana.
