= Pedro de Toledo (viceroy of Naples) =

Spanish viceroy (1484–1553)

- Portrait by Titian, 1542

Viceroy of Naples
- In office 4 September 1532 – 21 February 1553
- Monarch: Charles V
- Preceded by: Pompeo Colonna
- Succeeded by: Pedro Pacheco de Villena

Personal details
- Born: 13 July 1484 Madrid, Crown of Castile
- Died: 21 February 1553 (aged 68) Florence, Republic of Florence
- Spouse(s): María Osorio y Pimentel, 2nd Marquise of Villafranca del Bierzo
- Children: Eleanor of Toledo; García Álvarez de Toledo y Osorio

Pedro Álvarez de Toledo y Zúñiga (13 July 1484 – 21 February 1553) was a Spanish politician. The first effective Spanish viceroy of Naples, in 1532–1552, he was responsible for considerable social, economic and urban improvement in the city and southern Italian kingdom in general. He was the father-in-law of Cosimo I de' Medici, Grand Duke of Tuscany.

== Biography ==
=== Early life ===
Pedro was born in 1484 near Salamanca in Spain, the second son of Fadrique Álvarez de Toledo, 2nd Duke of Alba and Isabel de Zúñiga y Pimentel. His paternal grandmother was Maria Enríquez, the half-sister of Juana Enríquez, the Queen Consort of Aragon through her marriage to widower king of Aragon Juan II of Aragon, and the mother of Ferdinand II of Aragon and ancestress of Habsburgs. Through this relation, Charles V, Holy Roman Emperor and King of Spain was a second cousin of Don Pedro.

=== Viceroy of Naples ===
Spain took over the Kingdom of Naples in 1503 and solidified her grasp after the final, failed attempt by France in 1529 to retake the kingdom. For the first three decades of the century, a succession of inconsequential viceroys ruled the vicerealm. Don Pedro arrived as viceroy in September 1532.

Don Pedro’s rebuilding of the city went on for years. Old city walls were expanded and an entirely new wall was built along the sea front. Fortresses along those walls and further up and down the coast from the city were modernized, and the Arsenale—the naval shipyards—were expanded considerably. Don Pedro also built the viceregal palace as well as a dozen blocks of barracks nearby, a square grid of streets lined with multi-storied buildings—unique in Europe for its time. Today, that section of Naples is still called the “Spanish Quarter”. The goal was to make not just the city of Naples, but the Gulf of Naples and eventually, the entire vice-realm invulnerable—that is, the entire southern Italian peninsula.

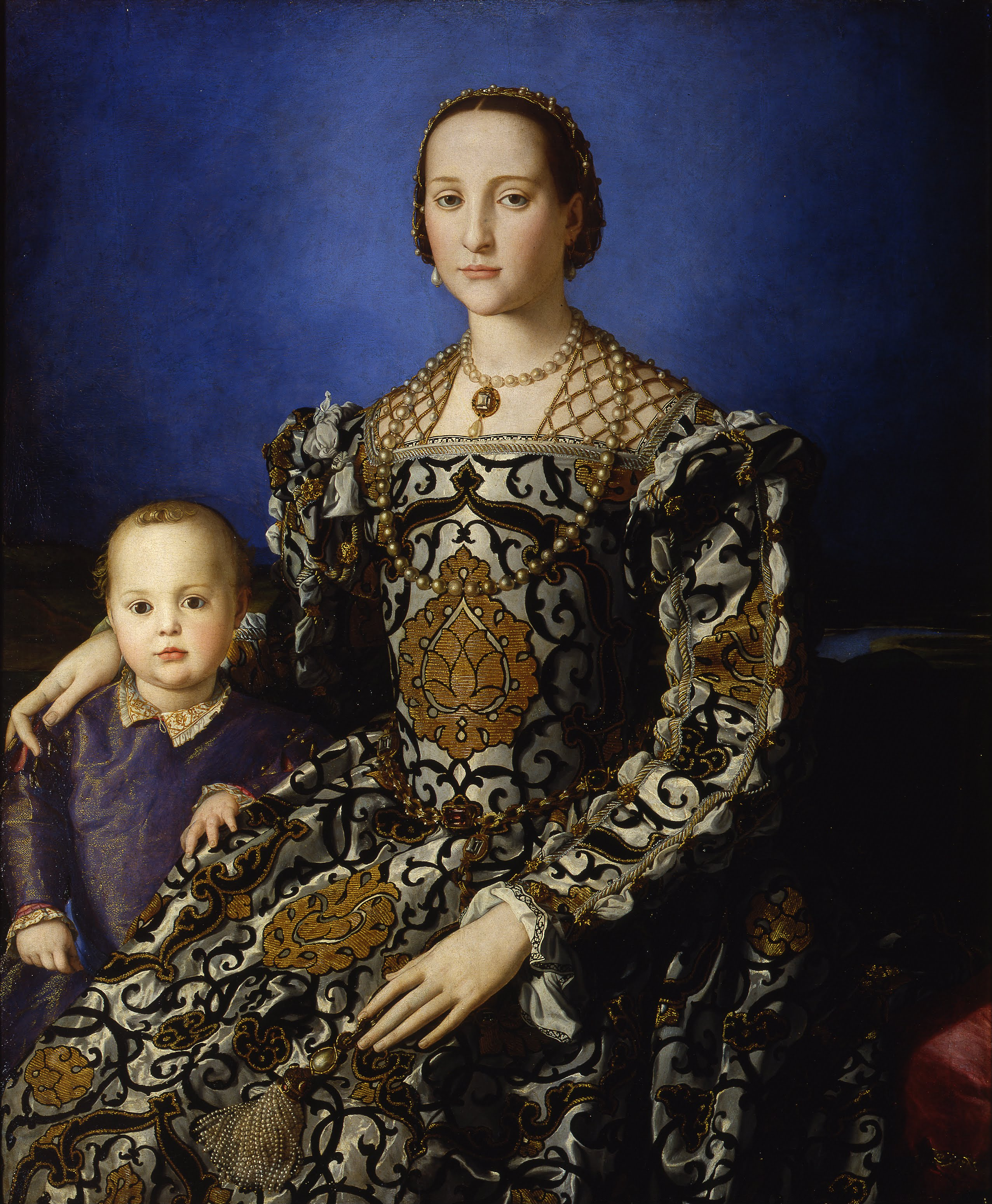
Eleanor of Toledo, daughter of Pedro Álvarez de Toledo, Viceroy of Naples, 1532- 1553, was the wife, since 1539, of Cosimo I de' Medici, Duke of Florence. Portrait by Agnolo Bronzino, oil on wood, 115x96 cm. Galleria degli Uffizi, Florence

Don Pedro ruled harshly. In 1542 he closed the Accademia Pontaniana. He instituted summary execution for petty theft on public streets and made it a capital crime to go armed at night in the city. He was ruthless in dealing with feudal barons in the countryside and encouraged their moving into the city within reach of a central authority. This breaking-up of land holdings began a trend to urbanization as both the landed class and the landless peasant class poured into Naples. By 1550, the population of 200,000 was second only to Paris in all of Europe. Within the city, he centralized administration, moving all courts onto the same premises, the Castel Capuano, also known as the "Vicaria".

Don Pedro is remembered as the viceroy who tried without success to institute the Spanish Inquisition in Naples, in 1547. When the announcement of the Inquisition finally came in May 1547, the protest was immediate, turning violent very quickly. It was not a "popular" revolution, but rather a revolt by many of the landed nobility in and around Naples and Salerno, property owners who knew that the Inquisition had a reputation for confiscating the wealth and property of those whom it questioned. Additionally his Jewish chief financier Samuel Abravanel along with his wife Benvenida, may have had some influence on him, in regards to ending his aspirations of an Inquisition.

Don Pedro, upon the order of the emperor Charles V, backed down and the Inquisition was called off. In 1552, Charles V calmed the populace further by sending Toledo off to Siena to handle a local problem. The viceroy died in Florence, where one of his daughters, Eleanor of Toledo was duchess consort of Medici the following year.

Don Pedro's reputation as a city-builder has stood the test of time. The city of Naples still bears his stamp in countless places. He was supposed to be entombed in the church of San Giacomo degli Spagnoli in Naples, but his sudden death in Florence meant that he was buried there, in the Cathedral of Florence.

== Marriage and issue ==
Don Pedro Álvarez de Toledo married in 1508 Maria Osorio y Pimentel, 2nd Marchioness of Villafranca del Bierzo. They had:

- Eleanor of Toledo, married in 1539 Cosimo I de' Medici, Grand Duke of Tuscany. With issue.
- Fadrique Álvarez de Toledo y Osorio, 3rd Marquess of Villafranca del Bierzo; (1510 - 1569). 3rd Marquess on the death of his mother in 1539. He married Inés Pimentel, but no issue.
- García Álvarez de Toledo, 4th Marquess of Villafranca del Bierzo, a.k.a. García Álvarez de Toledo y Osorio (1514–1577, in Naples, Italy) became the 4th Marquess of Villafranca del Bierzo in 1569, when his brother Fadrique died without issue, albeit being married. He married Vittoria Colonna, having issue, Pedro, who survived till 1627.
- Ana de Toledo, married Lopo de Moscoso Osório, 4th count of Altamira.
- Juana Álvarez de Toledo, married Fernando Ximenez de Urrea, 2nd Count of Aranda
- Isabel de Toledo, married Gian Battista Spinelli, 2nd Prince of Cariati
- Luis Álvarez de Toledo y Osorio, interim Viceroy of Naples for 2 months in 1552, commander in the Order of Santiago.

== Sources ==
- Amabile, Luigi (1892). Il santo Officio della Inquisizione in Napoli (in Italian). Città di Castello, Italy: S. Lapi.
- Croce, Benedetto (1915). Storia del Regno di Napoli (in Italian). Bari, Italy.
- Boase, Roger (2017). Secrets of Pinar's Game: Court Ladies and Courtly Verse in Fifteenth-Century Spain. Vol. 1. Brill. ISBN 9789004338364.
- De Seta, Cesare (1981). Le Città nella Storia d'Italia: Napoli, 'Il Viceregno' (in Italian). Bari, Italy: Laterza. pp. 106–128.
- Domínguez Ortiz, Antonio (1971). Los judeoconversos en España y América (in Spanish). Madrid, Spain.
- "Don Pedro de Toledo". Around Naples Encyclopedia. September 2008. Archived from the original on 2008-05-09.
- Gaston, Robert W. (2017). "Eleanora di Toledo's Chapel: Lineage, Salvation and the War Against the Turks". In Eisenbichler, Konrad (ed.). The Cultural World of Eleonora Di Toledo: Duchess of Florence and Siena. Taylor & Francis. ISBN 9781351545174.
- Tejada, Francisco Elías (1958). Nàpoles hispanico (in Spanish). Madrid, Spain.

Spanish nobility
Preceded by Luis Pimentel, 1st Marquess of Villafranca	Marquess of Villafranca; 1497–1553	Succeeded by Fadrique de Toledo, 3rd Marquess of Villafranca
Government offices
Preceded by Pompeo Cardinal Colonna	Viceroy of Naples; 1532–1552	Succeeded by Luis Álvarez de Toledo y Osorio, interim, 2 months, in 1552, on his father illness
