= Flag of Florence =

- Use: Civil flag
- Adopted: 1250
- Design: A white field charged with a red giglio
- Use: State flag of the Republic of Florence
- Adopted: From Middle Age to 1569
- Design: A red field charged with a white cross

The flag of Florence, also known as the Giglio of Florence (Italian: Il Giglio Fiorentino), was the flag of the Republic of Florence between 1250 and 1532. The flag persisted as a symbol of the city following the dissolution of the Republic and enjoys continued usage throughout Florence today.

The flag consists of a white field charged with a stylized red iris, commonly referred to as the giglio.

== History ==
One theory surrounding the origins of the flag can be traced back to founding of the city during the Roman Empire in 59 BC. The founding of the city during the period of the celebrations for the Roman goddess Flora led to flowers, in particular the iris, being celebrated as a symbol of Florence. Another explanation for the adoption of the flag stems from the abundance of the flower Iris florentina around the city.

The usage of red and white on the flag may possibly have derived from the coat of arms of Hugh, Margrave of Tuscany (969–1001), who adopted a palleted shield of alternating red and white vertical stripes.

Despite the ambiguity surrounding the origins of the giglio, by the 11th century the Florentine Ghibellines faction had adopted a coat of arms bearing a white giglio on a field of red, resulting in the symbol becoming associated with the city. However, in 1250 the Ghibellines were defeated and exiled by their rivals, the Guelphs.

The continued use of the white giglio on a red field by the exiled Ghibellines led to the Guelphs inverting the colours of the city, creating a flag bearing a red giglio on a white background. The symbol was then used extensively in the city, being adorned on multiple public buildings whilst the flag was flown atop many others. The giglio was also featured in other ways, such as featuring on the shield of Marzocco, the heraldic lion symbol which came to personify Florence in the 14th century. The best known depiction of the giglio and Marzocco can be found in Piazza della Signoria, which was created some time between 1418 and 1420 by Donatello.

The new symbol of Florence came to be used throughout the city and beyond as a symbol of Florentine power and strength. The Giglio of Florence could be found in the areas surrounding Florence, such as in Scarperia and Castlefiorentino, yet they were depicted without the stamens of the iris, which were exclusively reserved for usage on symbols in the city of Florence.

The flag also featured on the first Florins minted by the city in 1252.

In 1532 Pope Clement VII created the title Duke of the Florentine Republic to his relative Alessandro de' Medici, replacing the Republic with the Duchy of Florence, ruled by the Medici family. By 1532 the Giglio of Florence was replaced with depictions of the Medici coat of arms. Yet, usage of the Giglio of Florence saw continued widespread use by the population and remained synonymous with the city.

Between 1808 and 1814, Florence was under the control of Napoleon Bonaparte, becoming the prefecture of the Arno department of the First French Empire. Napoleonic control of the city led to attempts to ban the Giglio of Florence and replace it with another flag. Strong dissent and violent protests from the population led to the abandonment of such an idea.

The Giglio of Florence can also be found adorning the elaborate facade of Florence Cathedral and Giotto's Campanile.

== Modern-day usage ==
The Giglio of Florence continues to enjoy usage throughout the city. The flag is featured on the crest of Serie A side Fiorentina. The flag also features heavily in the traditional flag throwing competition for the Marzocco Trophy, which takes place on 1 May every year in the Piazza della Signoria.

Throughout the city of Florence, the flag can be found flying from multiple public and private buildings, such as from the Palazzo Vecchio.

The flag of Florence also features on numerous public amenities and services. For example, the flag can be found on garbage bins, ambulances, and trolly poles throughout the city.

== Gallery ==
Flags of Florence

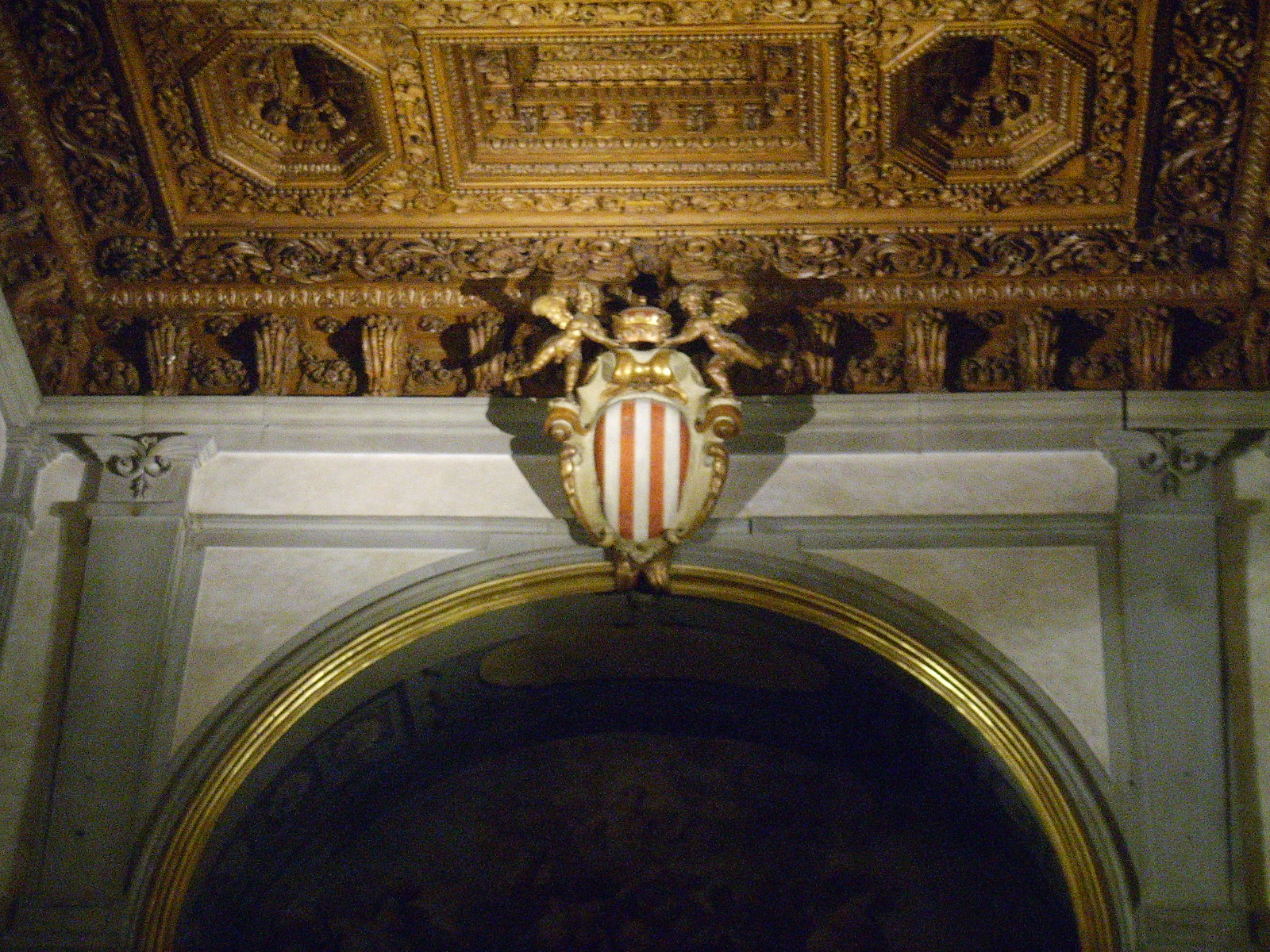
Coat of arms of Hugh, Margrave of Tuscany
(969–1001)

Flag used until the defeat of the Ghibellines in 1250

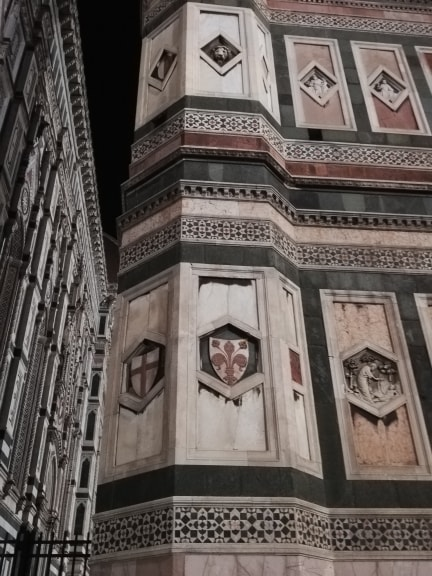
The Giglio of Florence as seen on Giotto's Campanile

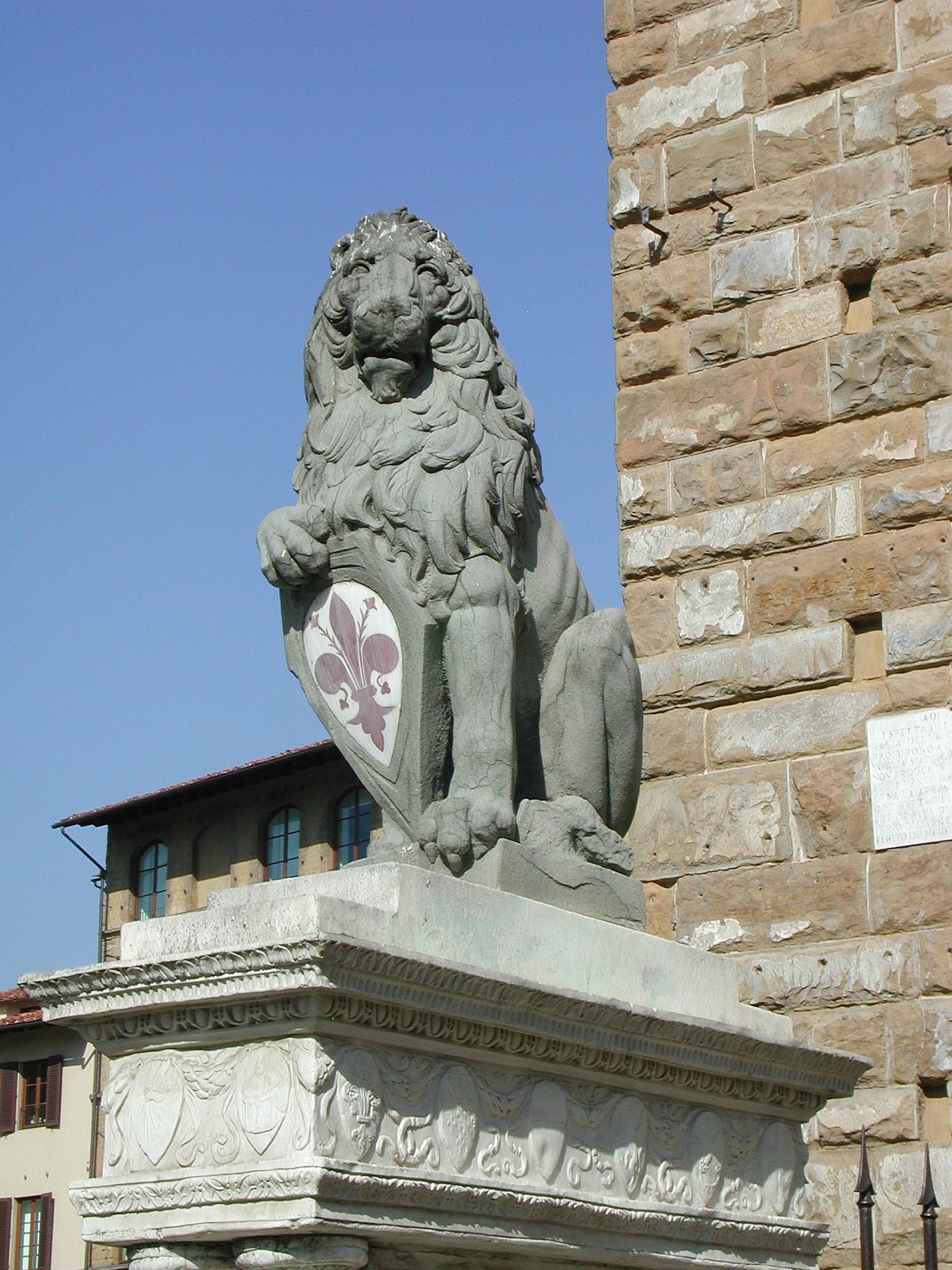
The Marzocco holding a shield emblazoned with the flag of Florence

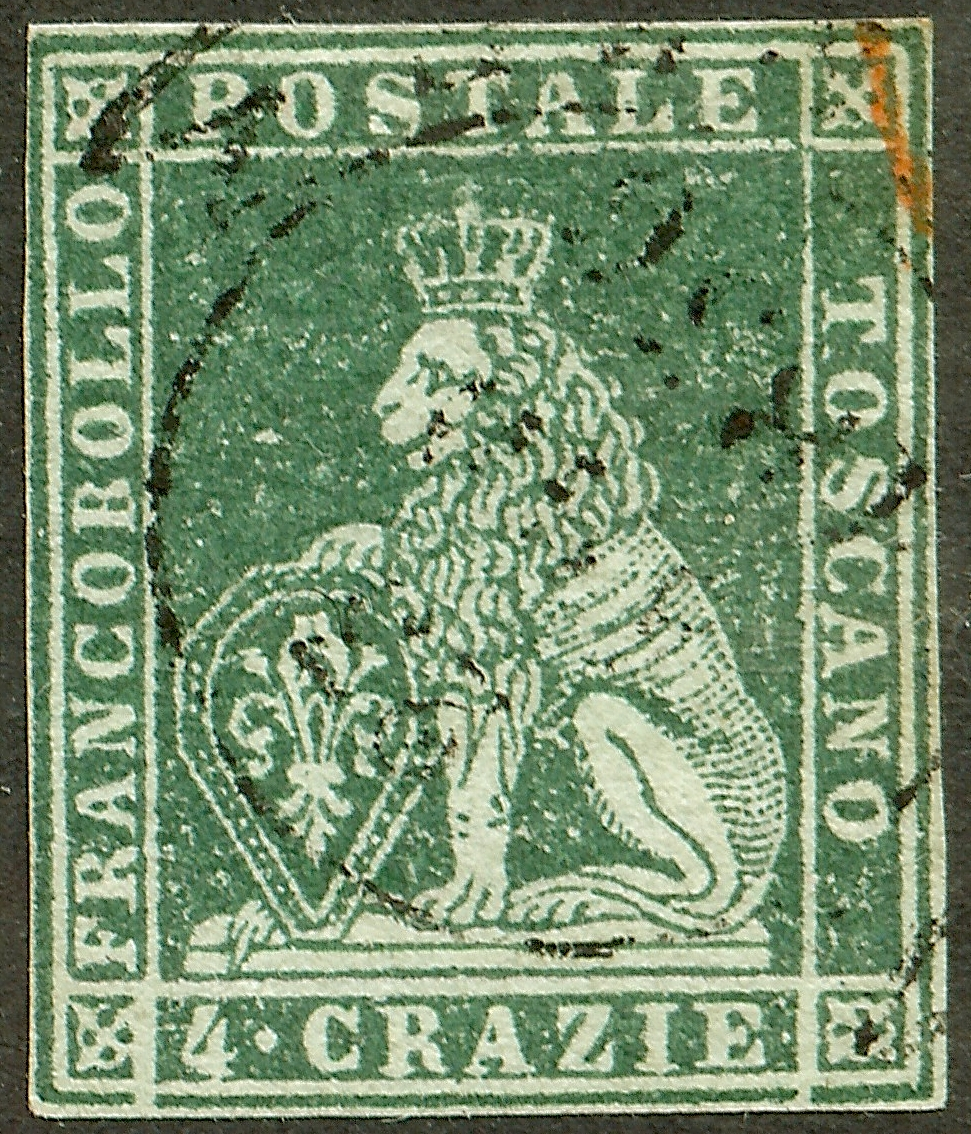
The flag of Florence on a postage stamp, 1851
