= Duchy of Florence =

Italian municipality (1532–1569)

Duchy of Florence Ducato di Firenze (Italian)
- 1532–1569
- Flag Coat of arms

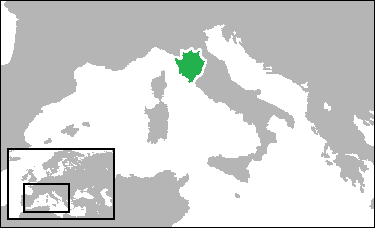
- The Duchy of Florence (green) in 1548
- Capital: Florence; 43°47′N 11°15′E
- Common languages: Italian
- Religion: Catholic Church
- Government: Hereditary monarchy
- Duke of Florence
  - 1532–1537: Alessandro
  - 1537–1569: Cosimo I
- History
  - Established: 1532
  - Battle of Marciano: 1554
  - Elevated to Grand Duchy: 1569
- Currency: Florin
Preceded by	Succeeded by
Republic of Florence; Republic of Siena	Grand Duchy of Tuscany
- Today part of: Italy

The Duchy of Florence (Italian: Ducato di Firenze) was an Italian principality that was centred on the city of Florence, in Tuscany, Italy. The duchy was founded after Pope Clement VII, himself a Medici, appointed his relative Alessandro de' Medici as Duke of the Florentine Republic, thereby transforming the Republic of Florence into a hereditary monarchy.

The second Duke, Cosimo I, established a strong Florentine navy and expanded his territory, purchasing Elba and conquering Siena. In 1569, Pope Pius V declared Cosimo Grand Duke of Tuscany. The Medici ruled the Grand Duchy of Tuscany until 1737.

== Origins and constitution ==
Florence had been under informal Medici control since 1434. During the War of the League of Cognac, the Florentines rebelled against the Medici, then represented by Ippolito de' Medici, and restored the freedom of their republic. Following the Republic's surrender in the Siege of Florence, Charles V, Holy Roman Emperor issued a proclamation explicitly stating that he and he alone could determine the government of Florence. On 12 August 1530, the Emperor created the Medici hereditary rulers (capo) of the Republic of Florence.

Pope Clement VII intended his relative Alessandro de' Medici (Note: Alessandro is usually considered an illegitimate son of Lorenzo II, Duke of Urbino, though some historians suggest that Clement himself was the father.) to be the ruler of Florence, but also wanted to give the impression that the Florentines had democratically chosen Alessandro as their ruler. The title "Duke of Florence" was chosen because it would bolster Medici power in the region. In April 1532, the Pope convinced the Balía, Florence's ruling commission, to draw up a new constitution, which formally created a hereditary monarchy. It abolished the age-old signoria (elective government) and the office of gonfaloniere (titular head-of-state elected for a two-month term) and replaced it with three institutions:

- the consigliere, a four-man council elected for a three-month term, headed by the "Duke of the Florentine Republic".
- the Senate, composed of forty-eight men, chosen by the Balía, was vested with the prerogative of determining Florence's financial, security, and foreign policies. Additionally, the senate appointed the commissions of war and public security, and the governors of Pisa, Arezzio, Prato, Voltera and Cortona and ambassadors.
- the Council of Two Hundred was a petitions court; membership was for life.

== Alessandro's reign ==
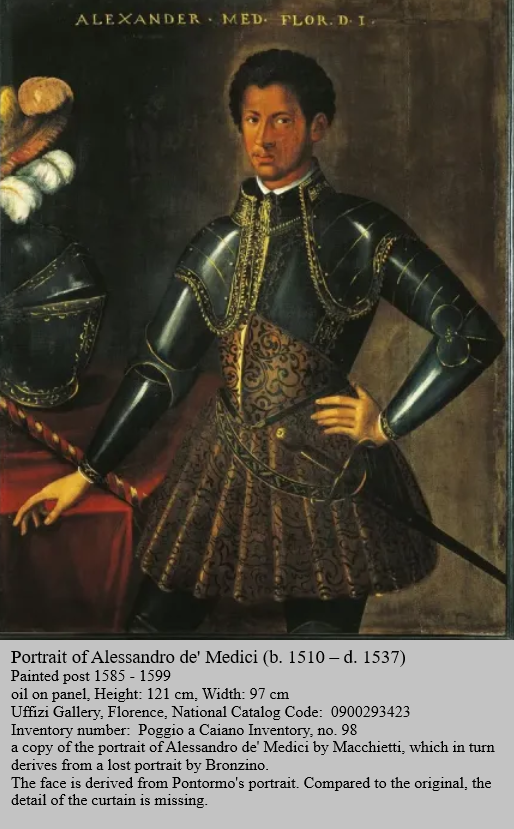
Pottrait of Alessandro de' Medici at Uffizi galleries.

Even after Alessandro's accession, Imperial troops remained stationed in Florence. In 1535, several prominent Florentine families, including the Pazzi (who attempted to kill Lorenzo de' Medici in the Pazzi Conspiracy) dispatched a delegation under Ippolito de' Medici, asking Charles V to depose Alessandro. Much to their dismay, the Emperor rejected their appeal. Charles had no intention of deposing Alessandro, who was married to Charles' daughter Margaret of Parma.

Alessandro continued to rule Florence for another two years until he was murdered on 6 January 1537 by his distant relative Lorenzino de' Medici.

== Cosimo's accession and rule ==
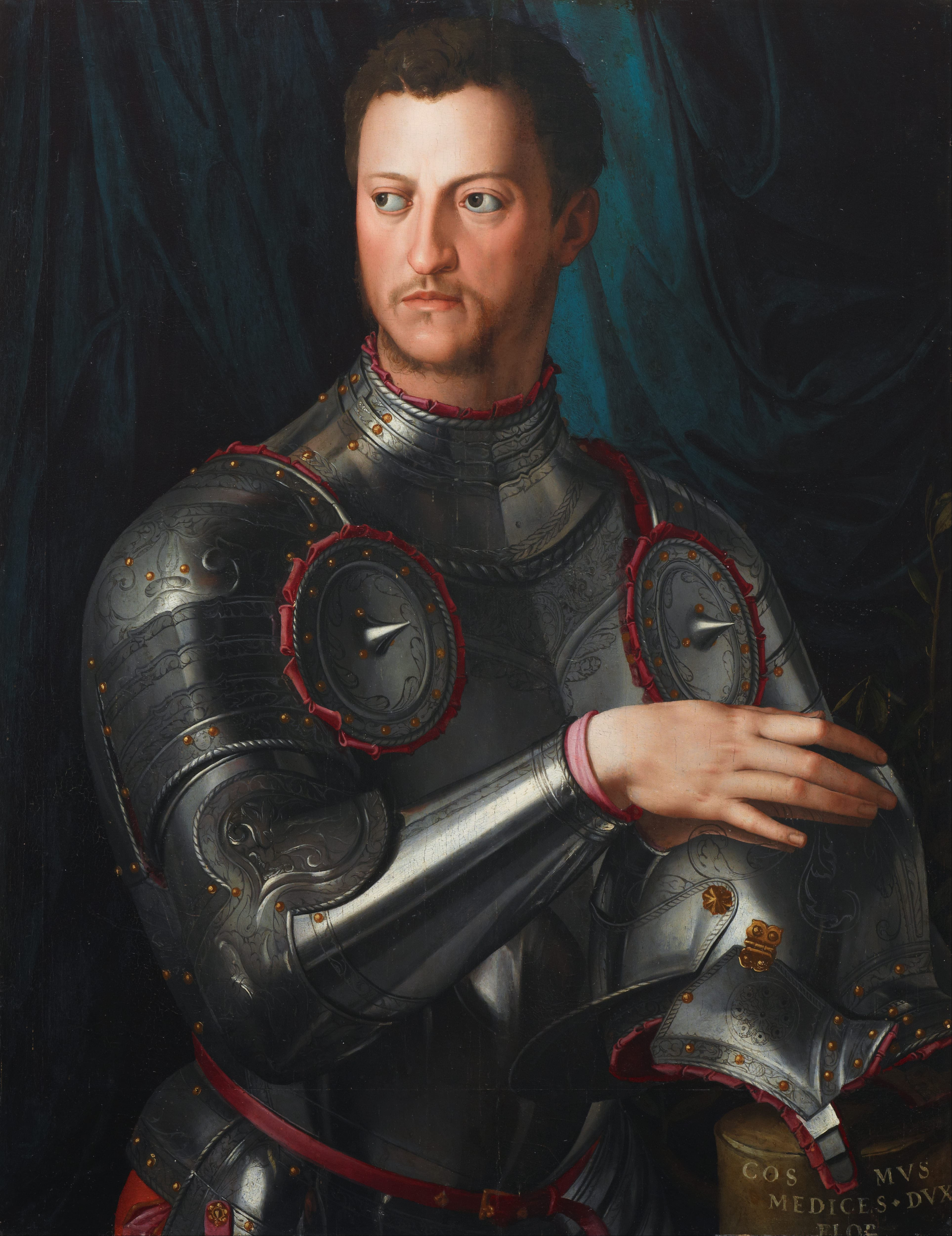
Cosimo I de' Medici

As Alessandro left no legitimate issue, the question of succession was open. Florentine authorities selected Cosimo I in 1537. At the news of this, the exiled Strozzi family invaded and tried to depose Cosimo, but were defeated at Montemurlo. Cosimo completely overhauled the bureaucracy and administration of Florence. In 1542, the Imperial troops stationed in Florence by Charles V were withdrawn.

In 1548, Cosimo was given Elba by Charles V, and based his new developing navy there. Cosimo founded the port city of Livorno and allowed the city's inhabitants to enjoy freedom of religion. In alliance with Spain and the Holy Roman Empire, Cosimo defeated the Republic of Siena, which was allied with France, in the Battle of Marciano on 2 August 1554. On 17 April 1555 Florence and Spain occupied the territory of Siena, which, in July 1557 Philip II of Spain bestowed on Cosimo as a hereditary fiefdom. The ducal family moved into the Palazzo Pitti in 1560. Cosimo commissioned the architect Vasari to build the Uffizi, as offices for the Medici bank, continuing the Medici tradition of patronage of the arts. In 1569, Cosimo was elevated to the rank of Grand Duke of Tuscany in 1569 by Pope Pius V. Medici rule continued into the Grand Duchy of Tuscany until the family became extinct in 1737.

== Sources ==
- Crum, Roger J.; Paoletti, John T., eds. (2008). Renaissance Florence: A Social History. Cambridge University Press.
- Fletcher, Catherine (2016). The Black Prince of Florence: The Spectacular Life and Treacherous World of Alessandro de' Medici. Bodley Head.
- Goudriaan, Elisa (2018). Florentine Patricians and Their Networks: Structures Behind the Cultural Success and the Political Representation of the Medici Court (1600–1660). Brill.
- Hale, J.R. (2001). Florence and the Medici. Phoenix Publishing. ISBN 1-84212-456-0.
- Hattendorf, John B.; Unger, Richard W., eds. (2003). War at Sea in the Middle Ages and the Renaissance. The Boydell Press.
- Landon, William J. (2013). Lorenzo di Filippo Strozzi and Niccolo Machiavelli. University of Toronto Press.
- Langdon, Gabrielle (2006). Medici Women: Portraits of Power, Love and Betrayal from the Court of Duke Cosimo I. University of Toronto Press.
- van Veen, Henk Th. (2013). Cosimo I De' Medici and His Self-Representation in Florentine Art and Culture. Cambridge University Press.
