= Alessandro de' Medici, Duke of Florence =

Duke of Florence from 1532 to 1537

Alessandro de' Medici
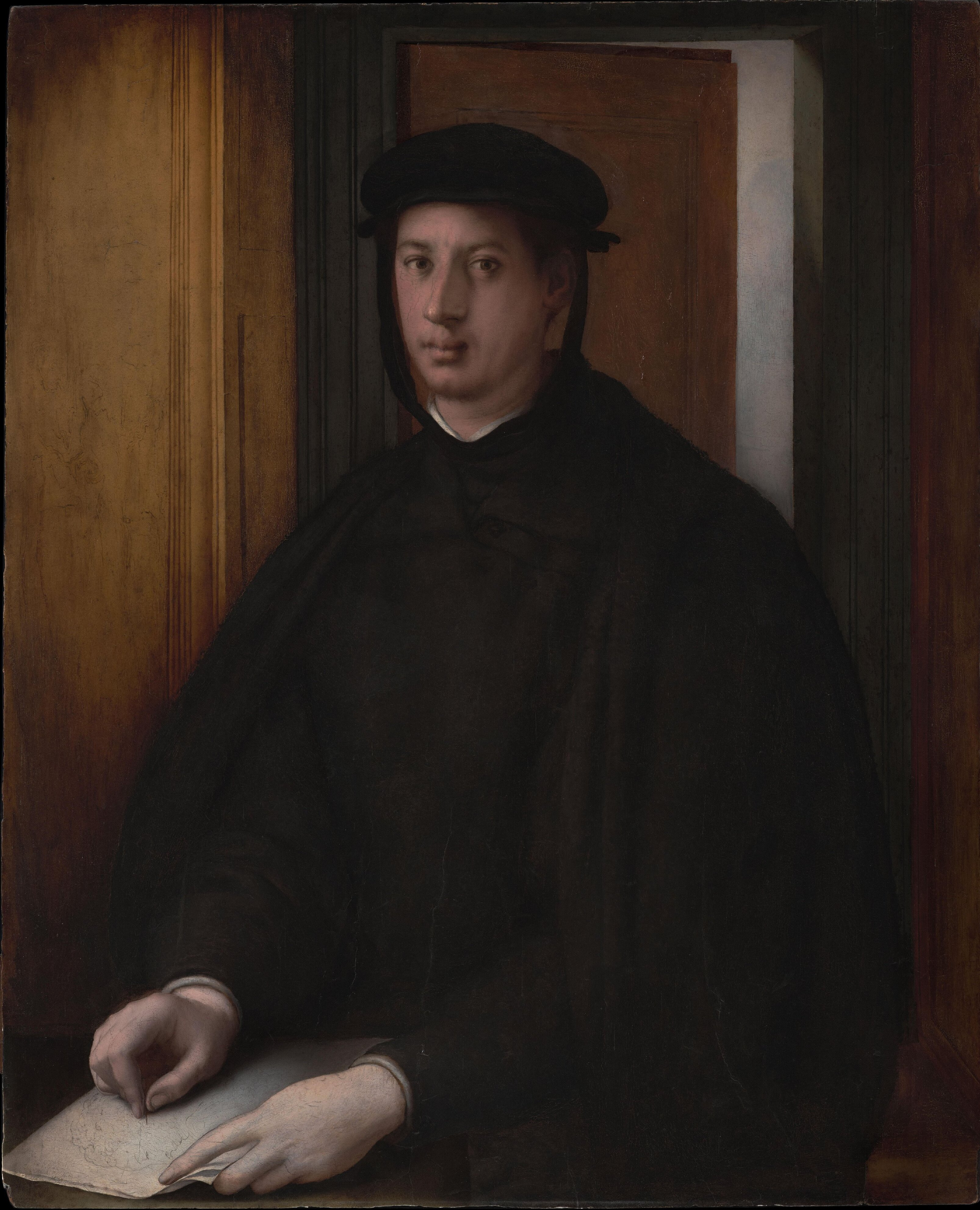
- Portrait of Alessandro de' Medici, duke of Florence, painted by Pontormo, oil on canvas, c. 1534–1535, Philadelphia Museum of Art

Duke of Florence
- Reign: 1 May 1532 – 6 January 1537
- Predecessor: Ippolito de' Medici
- Successor: Cosimo I de' Medici
- Born: 22 July 1510; Florence, Republic of Florence
- Died: 6 January 1537 (aged 26); Florence, Duchy of Florence
- Spouse: Margaret of Parma (m. 1536)
- Issue: Giulio de' Medici (illegitimate); Giulia de' Medici (illegitimate); Porzia de' Medici (illegitimate)
- House: Medici
- Father: Lorenzo de' Medici, Duke of Urbino
- Mother: Simonetta da Collevecchio
- Religion: Catholicism

Alessandro de' Medici (22 July 1510 – 6 January 1537), nicknamed "il Moro" due to his dark complexion, Duke of Penne and the first Duke of the Florentine Republic (from 1532), was ruler of Florence from 1530 to his death in 1537. The first Medici to rule Florence as a hereditary monarch, Alessandro was also the last Medici from the senior line of the family to lead the city. His assassination at the hands of distant cousin Lorenzaccio caused the title of Duke to pass to Cosimo I de Medici, from the family's junior branch.

== Life ==
Born in Florence, Alessandro was recognized by a plurality of his contemporaries as the only son of Lorenzo II de' Medici, Duke of Urbino, grandson of Lorenzo de' Medici "the Magnificent". Others believed him to be the illegitimate son of Giulio de' Medici (later Pope Clement VII), but at the time and today that was a minority view. Scipione Ammirato, the court historian of the Medicean grand duchy writes that "...some whose authority is credible and that have obtained this secret from penetralia servants, think he was son of Clement, born of a servant of the house when he was a knight of Saint John."

His nickname "il Moro" is attributed to his relatively dark pigmentation.

Some historians, such as Christopher Hibbert, present two hypotheses as to Alessandro de Medici's ancestry: he was "rumoured to be Cardinal Giulio's son by either a Moorish slave or a peasant woman from the Roman Campagna". His mother was identified in documents as Simonetta da Collevecchio, a servant of Alfonsina Orsini, grandmother of Alessandro. French author Jean Nestor reported in the 1560s that the claim of a Moorish slave origin was a false rumor first spread by Alessandro's exiled enemies in Naples. University of Florence historian Giorgio Spini too described this rumour as unfounded, instead tracing Alessandro's mother to a peasant from the Roman countryside who would later go on to marry a carrier from Lazio.

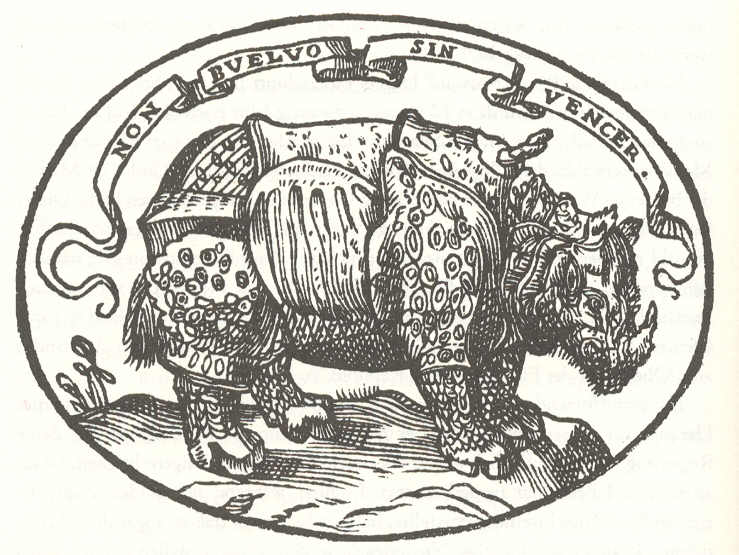
Emblem of Alessandro de' Medici, based on Dürer's Rhinoceros. Motto: "Non vuelvo sin vencer" (old Spanish for "I shall not return without victory") (From Paolo Giovio's Dialogo dell'imprese militari et amorose, 1557)

=== Early life ===
Alessandro spent his early childhood in Rome, where he received a humanist education by Pierio Valeriano Bolzani, under the supervision of Pope Leo X and Cardinal Giulio de’ Medici. During those years, a number of unexpected deaths occurred in the Medici family’s senior line: Giuliano de' Medici, Duke of Nemours (1516); Lorenzo II de' Medici, Duke of Urbino (1519); and eventually Pope Leo X (1521). This prompted Cardinal Giulio (then Gran Maestro of Florence, later Pope Clement VII), to relocate the remaining Medici heirs to Poggio a Caiano, near Florence: Alessandro; his half-sister Catherine, (later Queen Consort of France); and his cousin Ippolito, (later Vice-Chancellor of the Catholic Church). In 1522, Cardinal Giulio purchased the title 'Duke of Penne' for Alessandro from Charles V, Holy Roman Emperor.

When Cardinal Giulio became Pope Clement VII in 1523, he left leadership of Florence to Alessandro and Ippolito, under the regency of Papal representative Cardinal Silvio Passerini. Unfortunately, Alessandro and Ippolito were “alike in one respect only, their mutual hatred of each other.” They openly feuded throughout their short lives. Passerini was extremely unpopular with the anti-Medici faction in Florence, as well as with members of the Medici family such as Clarice Strozzi, daughter of Piero the Unfortunate. She disparaged not only Passerini but Alessandro as well, calling him unworthy of the family name. Outrage over the Medici-backed Passerini regency led to a popular revolt four years later.

During the Sack of Rome in 1527, a faction of Florentines overthrew the Medici and installed a theocratic, Savonarola-influenced Republic. Alessandro and Ippolito de' Medici were advised to leave the city with Cardinal Passerini. Many of the Medicis’ main supporters fled Florence; but eight-year-old Catherine de' Medici was left behind. Alessandro lived in exile for the next three years.

=== Duke of Florence ===
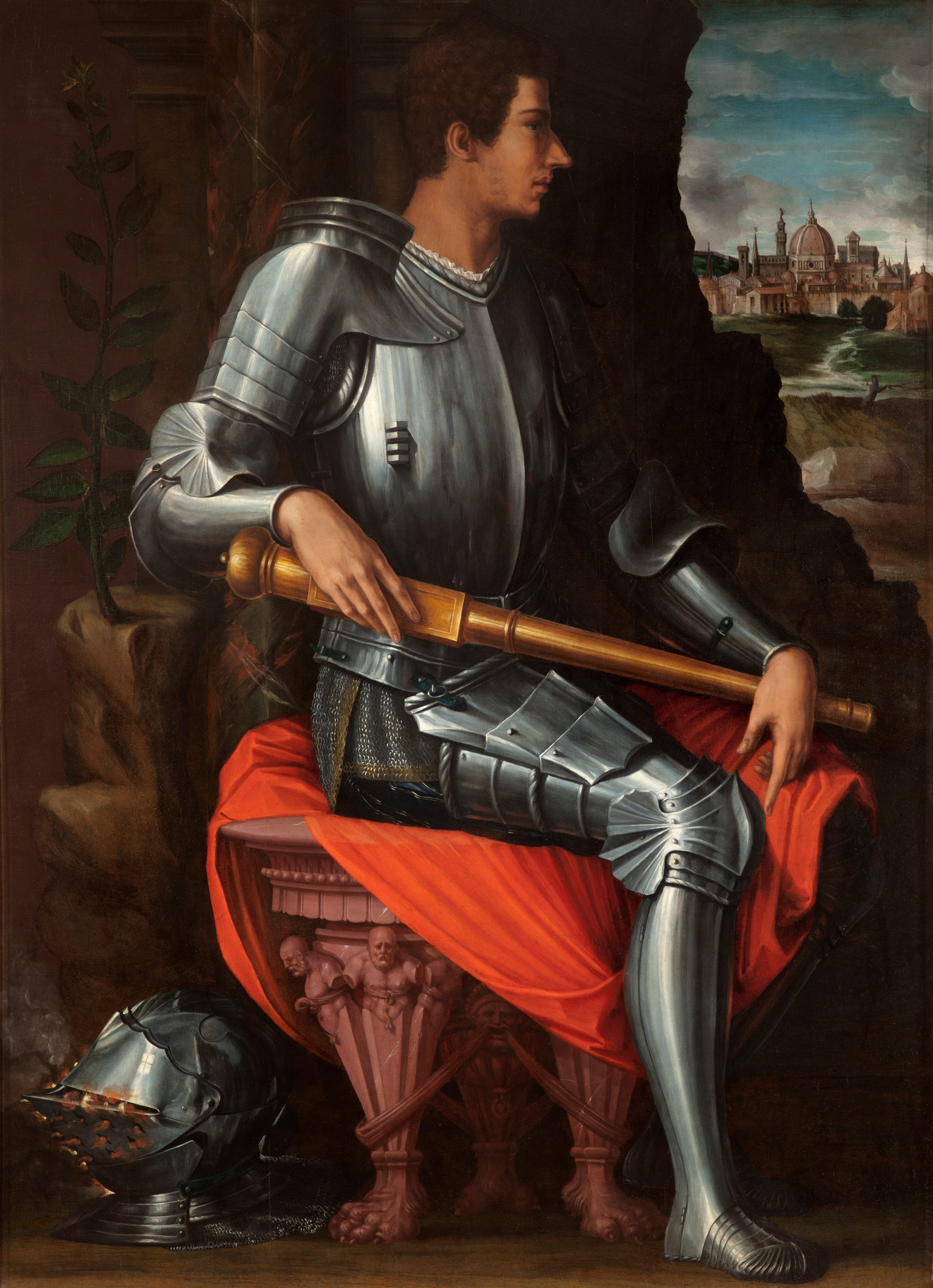
Portrait of Alessandro de’ Medici, by Giorgio Vasari (1534).

In 1530, after a nearly ten month siege of Florence supported by Spanish troops, Alessandro was named head of state. Pope Clement VII chose him for the position over Ippolito, who was made cardinal. Clement’s choice increased tension between the Medici cousins; for the rest of Ippolito’s life, he spoke openly about wanting to overthrow Alessandro and lead Florence. Alessandro arrived in Florence to rule on 5 July 1531. Nine months later he was made hereditary duke by Charles, as Tuscany was technically part of the Holy Roman Empire. This ended the Florentine Republic and started over 200 years of Medici monarchy.

The Florentine Constitution of 1532 consolidated Duke Alessandro’s power. While Clement lived, Alessandro ruled "with the advice of elected councils, trying to calm the nerves of the defeated republicans"; however, as his reign progressed he showed authoritarian tendencies. In 1534, he ordered construction of Florence’s Fortezza da Basso, “to secure the Medici’s control of the city following their recent return after the Siege of Florence, and to provide lodging for a massive contingent of troops.”

Duke Alessandro’s government drew both praise and criticism. His “common sense and his feeling for justice won his subjects’ affection”; and he “enjoyed some status as the champion of the poor and the helpless, as ballads and novelle record.” He was also a patron of the arts, commissioning notable works by Giorgio Vasari, Jacopo Pontormo, Benvenuto Cellini, and Antonio da Sangallo the Younger. Conversely, Florence’s vocal exile community judged his rule as harsh, depraved, and incompetent, an assessment debated by historians. In 1535, the exiles enlisted Cardinal Ippolito to meet with Emperor Charles V to denounce Alessandro's government; however, en route to the meeting, Ippolito died under questionable circumstances. Rumors spread that he was poisoned on Alessandro's orders. After the exiles voiced their complaints to Charles, Florentine diplomat Francesco Guicciardini responded, “his Excellency’s virtue, his fame, the opinion of him held throughout the city, of his prudence, of his virtuous habits, are a sufficient reply". Emperor Charles dismissed the complaints, continuing to support Alessandro.

== Assassination ==
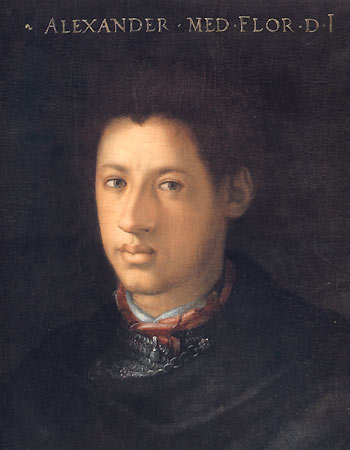
Portrait of Alessandro de' Medici in the Uffizi.

In 1537, Duke Alessandro's distant cousin and close friend Lorenzino de' Medici, "Lorenzaccio" ('bad Lorenzo'), assassinated him.

On 5/6 January, the Night of Epiphany, Lorenzino entrapped Duke Alessandro through the ruse of a promised sexual encounter with a beautiful widow. As Duke Alessandro waited alone and unarmed, Lorenzino and his servant Piero di Giovannabate, also called Scoronconcolo, ambushed him and "stabbed Alessandro with a dagger several times while the Duke fought back to the point that he bit off a significant portion of one of Lorenzino's fingers. Eventually, Alessandro succumbed to his wounds and Lorenzino and Scoronconcolo fled from the palace – after locking the door to the chamber to prevent their crime from being discovered too quickly."

For fear of starting an uprising if news of his death became public, Medici officials wrapped Alessandro's corpse in a carpet and secretly carried it to the cemetery of San Lorenzo, where it was hurriedly buried. In Valladolid, Spain, at the imperial court of Charles V, a solemn funeral was held for Alessandro.

Lorenzino, in a declaration published later, said that he had killed Alessandro to preserve the Republic of Florence. When Florence's anti-Medici faction failed to rise, Lorenzino fled to Venice, where he was killed in 1548 at the direct orders of Emperor Charles V. Florence's Medici supporters – called Palleschi from the balls on the Medici arms – ensured that power passed to Cosimo, the first of the "junior" branch of the Medici to rule Florence.

== Personal life ==
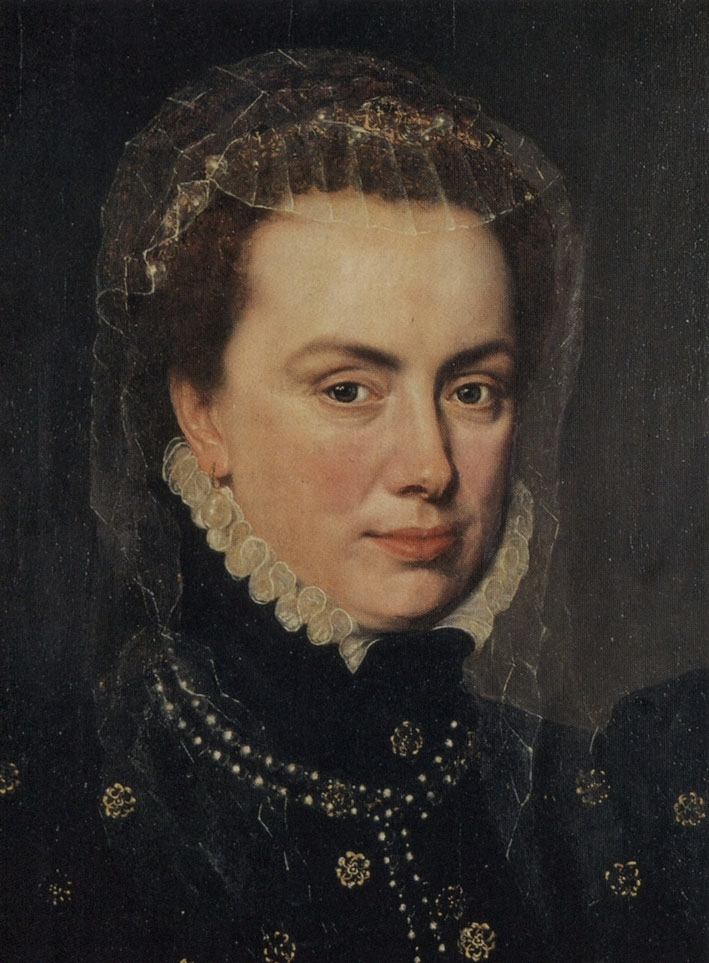
Margaret of Austria

In 1536, Emperor Charles kept a promise to Pope Clement by marrying his illegitimate daughter, Margaret of Austria, to Duke Alessandro. The couple were childless as he seems to have remained faithful to his mistress, Taddea Malaspina, who bore him two children: Giulio de' Medici (c. 1533/37–1600), and Giulia de' Medici. Giulio was married to Angelica Malaspina. Giulia was married first to Francesco Cantelmo, the Duke of Popoli, and then to Bernadetto de' Medici, the Prince of Ottajano. Some months after his death, he had an other illegitimate daughter by unknown mother: Porzia, who took holy vows and became an abbess.

== Popular culture ==
Alessandro’s assassination is the subject of Alfred de Musset’s play Lorenzaccio; Alexandre Dumas’ play Lorenzino; and the basis for Thomas Middleton’s play The Revenger's Tragedy, among other works.

The 2023 Italian short film Il Moro directed by Daphne di Cinto is based on Alessandro de' Medici's life. The film has won several awards and was considered for the 96th Academy Awards in the Best Live Action Short Film category.

Alessandro de' Medici was portrayed by Ashley Thomas in the second season of the American TV series The Serpent Queen in 2024. The show portrays de' Medici visiting France in 1572 (when he had in reality already been dead for over three decades) to aid her half-sister Catherine de Medici (played by Samantha Morton) in the intrigues of the French court in midst of the French wars of religion.

== Sources ==
- Hibbert, Christopher (1999). The House of Medici, Its Rise and Fall. Morrow. ISBN 978-0-688-00339-5.
- Schevill, Ferdinand (1936). History of Florence: from the founding of the city through the Renaissance (1st ed.). New York: Harcourt, Brace and Co.
- Brackett, John (2005) "Race and Rulership: Alessandro de' Medici, first Medici Duke of Florence, 1529–1537," in T.F. Earle and K.J.P. Lowe, Black Africans in Renaissance Europe.
- Fletcher, Catherine (2016). The Black Prince of Florence: The Spectacular Life and Treacherous World of Alessandro de' Medici. Oxford University Press. ISBN 978-0-19-061272-6.

Regnal titles
| Preceded by new office | Duke of Florence; 1532–1537 | Succeeded by Cosimo I |
