= Porzia de' Medici =

Illegitimate daughter of Alessandro de' Medici

- Born: 1537; Florence, Duchy of Florence
- Died: 1565 (aged 27–28); Florence, Duchy of Florence
- Noble family: Medici
- Father: Alessandro de' Medici, Duke of Florence

Porzia de' Medici (1537–1565) was an Italian missionary and illegitimate daughter of Alessandro de' Medici, Duke of Florence and an unknown mother. She was born after the assassination of Alessandro and was placed as a young child in the Augustinian convent of San Clemente in Via San Gallo. The convent was founded by Maria Salviati, the mother of Cosimo I de' Medici, to shelter the illegitimate daughters of Alessandro. Porzia took her final vows and became a Roman Catholic nun. Eventually she became the abbess of the convent.

Porzia was in close contact with members of the de' Medici family, including her half-sister Giulia de' Medici and her half-brother Giulio. A mural was painted depicting Porzia with Francesco, Ferdinando, Giovanni, and Garzia, the four sons of Cosimo I de' Medici. That mural has since been lost. Her half-sister Giulia often visited Porzia at her convent. She died in the convent at the age of twenty-seven.
