= Palleschi =

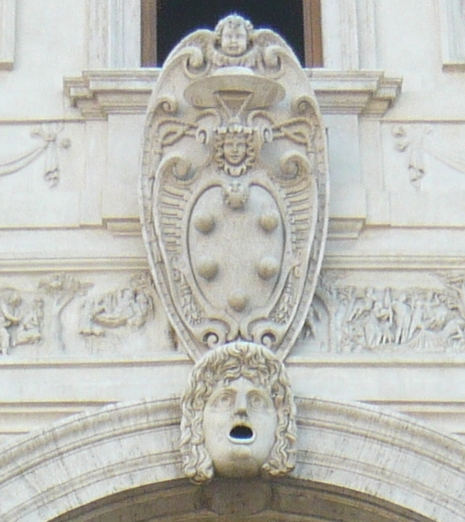
The Medici palle on their coat-of-arms at the Villa Medici, Rome

The palleschi, also known as bigi, were partisans of the Medici family in Florence. The name derived by the Medici coat-of-arms, bearing six 'balls' (palle).

Massimo D'Azeglio, Italian writer and historian, in his Niccolò de' Lapi, or the Palleschi and the Piagnoni (1866), wrote explicitly: "the part of the citizens which improved their reputation and got rich under the Medici.... was called pallesca".

On April 26, 1478, at the end of the so-called Pazzi conspiracy which resulted the death of Giuliano de' Medici (brother of Lorenzo, who was himself seriously wounded), the people of Florence responded to the cry "Freedom, Freedom!" by the conspirator Jacopo de' Pazzi with "Palle, palle!", in a clear reference to the Medici coat-of-arms and, more broadly, to their partisans the palleschi. Aldo Arcangeli, in his book The Strozzavolpe Castle writes that the conspirator Jacopo Bracciolini, secretary of Girolamo Riario, 'was hung by the Palleschi because of the Pazzi conspiracy" (Arcangeli, 1960).

The substantial equivalence between Palleschi and Medici partisans is confirmed by the letter written by the Florentine philosopher, writer and politician Niccolò Machiavelli "Il ricordo ai Palleschi del 1512" , a plea to the Palleschi, returned in Florence after twenty years of exile, in favor of the Gonfaloniere Piero Soderini "exiled by the government of the Florence Republic" (Vivanti, 1997).

Likewise, the rivalry between the Palleschi, partisans of the Medici family, and the Piagnoni ("Weepers"), followers of Girolamo Savonarola, developed into conflict. Massimo D'Azeglio in Niccolò de' Lapi says that "the parts of Piagnoni and Palleschi, rivals for old rancors and new insults, kept the city divided' (D'Azeglio, 1866).

After the death of Savonarola, the interests of the Palleschi came to be differentiated from purely Medici interests, as testified by the Storia Fiorentina of Benedetto Varchi (Firenze 1503–1565) in relation to the opposition of the Palleschi against the Medici Pope Clement VII (Varchi, 1857).

The fortunes of the Palleschi were nevertheless strictly connected to the Medici. For example, during the siege of Florence by Charles V when the Florentine government hardly repressed "the enemies within the walls", references the Palleschi who stayed in the city (Bertelli, 1986)

Many of them preferred the exile to Venice, Bologna or Rome so as to avoid being arrested or falling victim to the violence described by D'Azeglio in "Niccolò de' Lapi" (D'Azeglio, 1866)

== Bibliography ==
- F. Serafino Montorio, "Lo Zodiaco di Maria", Napoli 1715
- Benedetto Varchi, "Storia Fiorentina", Felice Le Monnier, Firenze 1857
- Massimo D'Azeglio, "Niccolò de' Lapi, ovvero, i Palleschi e i Piagnoni", Felice Le Monnier, Firenze 1866
- Sergio Bertelli, Franco Cardini, Elvira Galbero Zorzi, "Le Corti Italiane del Rinascimento", Mondadori 1986
- Aldo Arcangeli, "Il castello di Strozzavolpe", Ed. Nencini, Poggibonsi 1960.
- "Niccolò Machiavelli - Opere - volume I", a cura di Corrado Vivanti, Einaudi-Gallimard, Torino 1997
