= Republic of Florence =

City-state on the Italian Peninsula (1115–1569)

Republic of Florence Res publica Florentina (Latin) Republica di Fiorenza (Italian)
- 1115–1569
- Civil flag adopted by Guelphs in 1251 Arms adopted by Guelphs in 1251

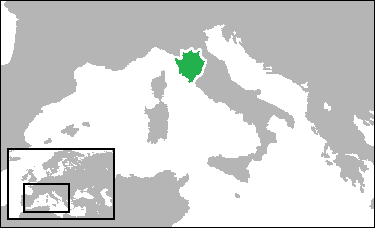
- The Florentine Republic in 1548
- Capital: Florence; 43°46′10″N 11°15′22″E
- Common languages: Latin, Italian
- Religion: Roman Catholicism
- Demonym: Florentine
- Government: Oligarchic republic (1115–1494; 1498–1532); Republic under a theocratic regime (1494–98) de jure Absolute Monarchy (1532-1569)
- Gonfaloniere
  - 1293–1295 (first): Giano della Bella
  - 1434–1464: Cosimo de' Medici
  - 1530–1532 (last): Alessandro de' Medici
- Duke of Florence
  - 1532–1537 (first): Alessandro
  - 1537–1569 (last): Cosimo I
- Legislature: Priorato delle Arti
  - Upper house: Council of Ancients
  - Lower house: Council of Consuls
- History
  - First established: 1115
  - Marquisate restored by Imperial force: 1185–1197
  - Ciompi Revolt: 1378
  - Incorporation of Pisa: 1406
  - Foundation of the House of Medici: 1434
  - Duchy of Florence: 1532
  - Occupation of Siena: 1555
  - Elevated to Grand Duchy of Tuscany: 1569
- Currency: Florin (from 1252)
Preceded by
1115: March of Tuscany
1254: Commune of Pistoia
1361: Lordship of Volterra
1384: Commune of Arezzo
1406: Republic of Pisa
1555: Republic of Siena
Succeeded by
Duchy of Florence
- Today part of: Italy

The Republic of Florence (Old Italian: Republica di Fiorenza; contemporary Italian: Repubblica di Firenze), also known as the Florentine Republic (Latin: Res publica Florentina; Old Italian: Republica Fiorentina; contemporary Italian: Repubblica Fiorentina [reˈpubblika fjorenˈtiːna]), was a medieval and early modern state that was centered on the Italian city of Florence in Tuscany. The republic originated in 1115, when the Florentine people rebelled against the Margraviate of Tuscany upon the death of Matilda of Tuscany, who controlled vast territories that included Florence. The Florentines formed a commune in Rabodo's (Matilda's successor) successors' place. The republic was ruled by a council known as the Signoria of Florence. The signoria was chosen by the gonfaloniere (titular ruler of the city), who was elected every two months by Florentine guild members.

During the Republic's history, Florence was an important cultural, economic, political and artistic force in Europe. Its coin, the florin, was the dominant trade coin of Western Europe for large scale transactions and became widely imitated throughout the continent. During the Republican period, Florence was also the birthplace of the Renaissance, which is considered a fervent period of European cultural, artistic, political and economic "rebirth".

The republic had a checkered history of coups and countercoups against various factions. The Medici faction gained governance of the city in 1434 under Cosimo de' Medici. The Medici kept control of Florence until 1494. Giovanni de' Medici, who later became Pope Leo X, reconquered the republic in 1512.

Florence repudiated Medici authority for a second time in 1527, during the War of the League of Cognac. The Medici reassumed their rule in 1531 after an 11-month siege of the city, aided by Emperor Charles V. Pope Clement VII, himself a Medici, appointed his relative Alessandro de' Medici as the first "Duke of the Florentine Republic", thereby transforming the Republic into a hereditary monarchy.

The second duke, Cosimo I, established a strong Florentine navy and expanded his territory, conquering Siena. In 1569, the pope declared Cosimo the first grand duke of Tuscany. The Medici ruled the Grand Duchy of Tuscany until 1737.

== Background ==
Italy in 1084, showing the Marquisate of Tuscany

The city of Florence was established in 59 BC by Julius Caesar. Since 846 AD, the city had been part of the Marquisate of Tuscany. After Margravine Matilda of Tuscany died in 1115, the city did not submit readily to her successor, Rabodo (r. 1116–1119), who was killed in a dispute with the city.

It is not known precisely when Florence formed its own republican/oligarchical government independent of the marquisate, although the death of Rabodo in 1119 should be a turning point. The first official mention of the Florentine republic was in 1138, when several cities around Tuscany formed a league against the then-margrave of Tuscany, Duke Henry X of Bavaria. The country was nominally part of the Holy Roman Empire.

According to a study carried out by Enrico Faini of the University of Florence, there were about fifteen old aristocratic families who moved to Florence between 1000 and 1100: Amidei; Ardinghi; Brunelleschi; Buondelmonti; Caponsacchi; Donati; Fifanti; Gherardini of Montagliari; Guidi; Nerli; Porcelli; Sacchetti; Scolari; Uberti; and Visdomini.

== History ==
=== 12th century ===
The newly independent Florence prospered in the 12th century through extensive trade with foreign countries. This, in turn, provided a platform for the demographic growth of the city, which mirrored the rate of construction of churches and palazzi. This prosperity was shattered when Emperor Frederick I Barbarossa invaded the Italian Peninsula in 1185. As a result, the margraves of Tuscany reacquired Florence and its townlands. The Florentines reasserted their independence when Emperor Henry VI died in 1197.

=== 13th century ===
Florence's population continued to grow into the 13th century, reaching 30,000 inhabitants. As has been said, the extra inhabitants supported the city's trade and vice versa. Several new bridges and churches were built, most prominently the cathedral of Santa Maria del Fiore, begun in 1294. The buildings from this era serve as Florence's best examples of Gothic Architecture. Politically, Florence was barely able to maintain peace between its competing factions. The precarious peace that existed at the beginning of the century was destroyed in 1216 when two factions, known as the Guelphs and the Ghibellines, went to war. The Ghibellines were supporters of the noble rulers of Florence, whereas the Guelphs were populists.

The Ghibellines, who had ruled the city under Frederick of Antioch since 1244, were deposed in 1250 by the Guelphs. The Guelphs led Florence to prosper further. Their primarily mercantile orientation soon became evident in one of their earliest achievements: the introduction of a new coin, the florin, in 1252. It was widely used beyond Florence's borders due to its reliable, fixed gold content and soon became one of the common currencies of Europe and the Near East. The same year saw the creation of the Palazzo del Popolo. The Guelphs lost the reins of power after Florence suffered a catastrophic defeat at the Battle of Montaperti against Siena in 1260. The Ghibellines resumed power and undid many of the advances of the Guelphs, for example the demolition of hundreds of towers, homes, and palaces. The fragility of their rule caused the Ghibellines to seek out an arbitrator in the form of Pope Clement IV, who openly favoured the Guelphs, and restored them to power.

The Florentine economy reached a zenith in the latter half of the 13th century, and its success was reflected by the building of the famed Palazzo della Signoria, designed by Arnolfo di Cambio. The Florentine townlands were divided into administrative districts in 1292. In 1293, the Ordinances of Justice were enacted, which effectively became the constitution of the republic of Florence throughout the Italian Renaissance. The city's numerous luxurious palazzi were becoming surrounded by townhouses built by the ever prospering merchant class. In 1298, the Bonsignori family of Siena, one of the leading banking families of Europe, went bankrupt, and the city of Siena lost its status as the most prominent banking center of Europe to Florence.

=== 14th century ===
In 1304, the war between the Ghibellines and the Guelphs led to a great fire that destroyed much of the city. Napier gives the following account:

Battles first began between the Cerchi and Giugni at their houses in the Via del Garbo; they fought day and night, and with the aid of the Cavalcanti and Antellesi the former subdued all that quarter: a thousand rural adherents strengthened their bands, and that day might have seen the Neri's destruction if an unforeseen disaster had not turned the scale. A certain dissolute priest, called Neri Abati, prior of San Piero Scheraggio, false to his family and in concert with the Black chiefs, consented to set fire to the dwellings of his own kinsmen in Orto-san-Michele; the flames, assisted by faction, spread rapidly over the richest and most crowded part of Florence: shops, warehouses, towers, private dwellings and palaces, from the old to the new market-place, from Vacchereccia to Porta Santa Maria and the Ponte Vecchio, all was one broad sheet of fire: more than nineteen hundred houses were consumed; plunder and devastation revelled unchecked amongst the flames, whole races were reduced in one moment to beggary, and vast magazines of the richest merchandise were destroyed. The Cavalcanti, one of the most opulent families in Florence, beheld their whole property consumed, and lost all courage; they made no attempt to save it, and, after almost gaining possession of the city, were finally overcome by the opposite faction.

— Henry Edward Napier, Florentine History, I. 394

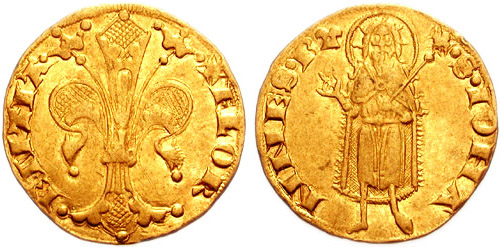
Front and back of a Florentine florin

The golden florin of the Republic of Florence was the first European gold coin struck in sufficient quantities to play a significant commercial role since the 7th century. As many Florentine banks were international companies with branches across Europe, the florin quickly became the dominant trade coin of Western Europe for large scale transactions, replacing silver bars in multiples of the mark.

In fact, with the collapse of the Bonsignori family, several new banking families sprang up in Florence: the Bardis, Peruzzis and the Acciaioli. The friction between the Guelphs and the Ghibellines did not cease, authority still passed between the two frequently.

Florence's reign as the foremost banking city of Europe did not last long; the aforesaid families were bankrupt in 1340, not because of Edward III of England's refusal to pay his debts, as is often stated (the debt was just £13,000) but because of a Europe-wide economic recession. While the banks perished, Florentine literature flourished, and Florence was home to some of the greatest writers in Italian history: Dante, Petrarch, and Boccaccio. They chose to write in the Tuscan dialect of Italian over Latin; as a result, Tuscan evolved into the standard Italian language.

Florence was hit hard by the Black Death. Having originated in the Orient, the plague arrived in Messina in 1347. The plague devastated Europe, robbing it of an estimated one-third of its population. This, combined with the economic downturn, took its toll on the city-state. The ensuing collapse of the feudal system changed the social composition of Europe forever; it was one of the first steps out of the Middle Ages.

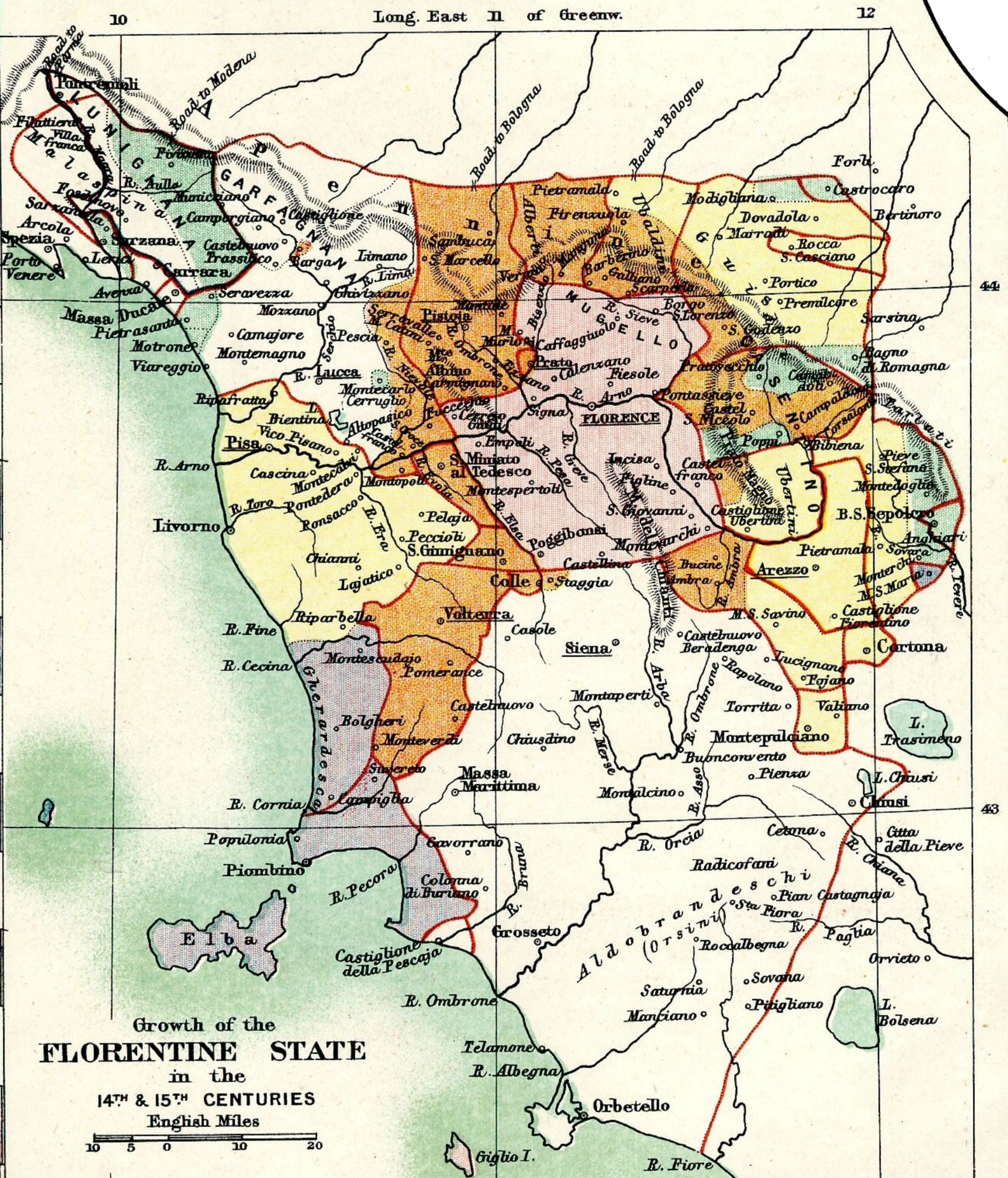
The growth of Florence from 1300 to 1500

The war with Avignon papacy strained the regime. In 1378 discontented wool workers revolted. The Ciompi revolt, as it is known, established a revolutionary commune. In 1382 the wealthier classes crushed the seeds of rebellion.

The famous Medici bank was established by Giovanni di Bicci de' Medici in October 1397. The bank continued to exist (albeit in an extremely diminished form) until the time of Ferdinando II de'Medici in the 17th century. But, for now, Giovanni's bank flourished.

Beginning in 1389, Gian Galeazzo Visconti of Milan expanded his dominion into the Veneto, Piedmont, Emilia and Tuscany. During this period Florence, under the leadership of Maso degli Albizzi and Niccolò da Uzzano was involved in three wars with Milan (1390–92, 1397–98, 1400–02). The Florentine army, commanded by John Hawkwood, contained the Milanese during the first war. The second war started in March 1397. Milanese troops devastated the Florentine contado, but were checked in August of that year.

The war expenses exceeded one million florins and necessitated tax raises and forced loans. A peace agreement in May 1398 was brokered by Venice, but left the struggle unresolved. Over the next two years Florentine control of Tuscany and Umbria collapsed. Pisa and Siena as well as a number of smaller cities submitted to Gian Galeazzo, while Lucca withdrew from the anti-Visconti league, with Bologna remaining the only major ally. In November 1400 a conspiracy involving both exiles and internal opponents was uncovered. Two Ricci were implicated as leaders of a plot to eliminate the regime's inner circle and open the gates to the Milanese. Confessions indicated that the plan had wide support among the elites, including a Medici and several of the Alberti.

The republic bankrolled the emperor-elect Rupert. However, he was defeated by the Milanese in the fall of 1401. Visconti then turned to Bologna. On 26 June 1402, combined Bolognese-Florentine forces were routed at Casalecchio, near Bologna, which was taken on the 30th. The road to Tuscany was open. However, Florence was saved after an outbreak of plague had spread from Tuscany to Emilia and Lombardy: Gian Galeazzo died from it on 3 September 1402.

=== 15th century ===
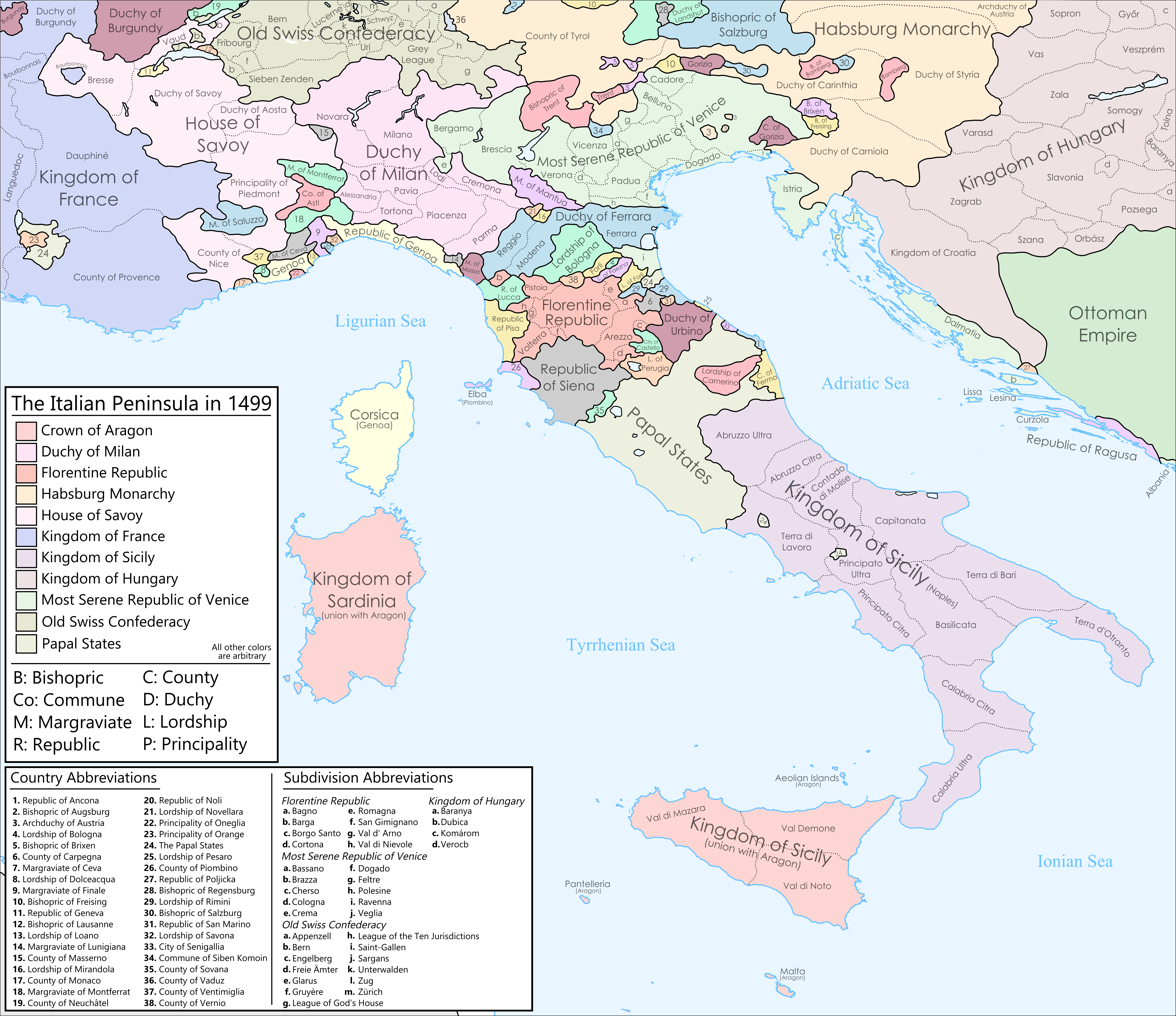
The Italian Peninsula in 1499

The Visconti domains were divided between three heirs. Gabriele Maria Visconti sold Pisa to the Republic of Florence for 200,000 florins. Since the Pisans did not intend to voluntarily submit to their long-time rivals, the army under Maso degli Albizzi took Pisa on 9 October 1406 after a long siege, that was accompanied by numerous atrocities.

The state authorities had been approached by the Duchy of Milan in 1422, with a treaty, that prohibited Florence's interference with Milan's impending war with the Republic of Genoa. Florence obliged, but Milan disregarded its own treaty and occupied a Florentine border town. The conservative government wanted war, while the people bemoaned such a stance as they would be subject to enormous tax increases. The republic went to war with Milan, and won, upon the Republic of Venice's entry on their side. The war was concluded in 1427, and the Visconti of Milan were forced to sign an unfavourable treaty.

The debt incurred during the war was gargantuan, approximately 4,200,000 florins. To pay, the state had to change the tax system. The current estimo system was replaced with the catasto. The catasto was based on a citizen's entire wealth, while the estimo was simply a form of income tax. Apart from war, Filippo Brunelleschi created the renowned dome of the Santa Maria del Fiore, which astounded contemporaries and modern observers alike.

==== Medicis' rule ====
Coat of arms of the House of Medici

The son of Giovanni di Bicci de' Medici, Cosimo de' Medici succeeded his father as the head of the Medici Bank. He played a prominent role in the government of Florence until his exile in 1433, after a disastrous war with Tuscany's neighbour, the Republic of Lucca. Cosimo's exile in Venice lasted for less than a year, when the people of Florence overturned Cosimo's exile in a democratic vote. Cosimo returned to the acclaim of his people and the banishment of the Albizzi family, who had exiled him.

===== Cosimo de' Medici =====
The Renaissance began during Cosimo's de facto rule of Florence, the seeds of which had arguably been laid before the Black Death tore through Europe. Niccolò Niccoli was the leading Florence humanist scholar of the time. He appointed the first Professor of Greek, Manuel Chrysoloras (the founder of Hellenic studies in Italy), at the University of Florence in 1397. Niccoli was a keen collector of ancient manuscripts, which he bequeathed to Cosimo upon his death in 1437. Poggio Bracciolini succeeded Niccoli as the principal humanist of Florence. Bracciolini was born Arezzo in 1380. He toured Europe, searching for more ancient Greco-Roman manuscripts for Niccoli. Unlike his employer, Bracciolini also authored his own works. Shortly before his death, he was made the Chancellor of Florence by Cosimo, who was his best friend.

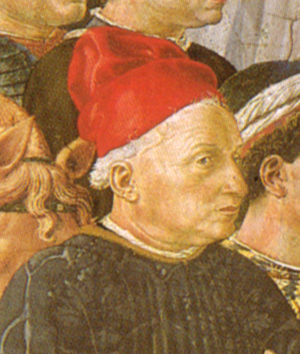
Cosimo de' Medici, founder of the House of Medici

Florence hosted the Great Ecumenical Council in 1439; this council was launched in an attempt to reconcile the Byzantine Eastern Orthodox Church with Roman Catholicism. Pope Eugenius IV convened it in reply to a cry for assistance from the Emperor of the Eastern Roman Empire (also known as the Byzantine Empire) John VIII Palaiologos. John VIII's empire was slowly being devoured by the Ottoman Turks.The council was a huge boost to Florence's international prestige. The council deliberated until July 1439. Both parties had reached a compromise, and the Pope agreed to militarily aid the Byzantine Emperor. However, upon John VIII's homecoming to Constantinople, the Greeks rejected the compromise, leading to riots throughout what remained of the Byzantine Empire. John VIII was forced to repudiate the agreement with the Roman church to appease the rioters. As a result, no Western aid was forthcoming and the Byzantine Empire's fate was sealed. Fourteen years later in 1453, Constantinople fell to the Ottomans.

Cosimo's fervent patronage transformed Florence into the epitome of a Renaissance city. He employed Donatello, Brunelleschi, and Michelozzo. All these artistic commissions cost Cosimo over 600,000 florins.

Foreign relations, both as a backdrop to Cosimo's rise to power and during the first twenty years of his rule, were dominated by the Wars in Lombardy. This series of conflicts between the Venetian Republic and the Duchy of Milan for hegemony in Northern Italy lasted from 1423 to 1454 and involved a number of Italian states, which occasionally switched sides according to their changing interests. Filippo Maria Visconti of Milan invaded Florence twice in the 1430s, and again in 1440, but his army was finally defeated in the battle of Anghiari. The Milanese invasions were largely instigated by the exiled Albizzi family. Death of Filippo Maria in 1447 led to a major change in the alliances. In 1450 Cosimo's current ally Francesco Sforza established himself as the Duke of Milan. Florentine trade interests made her support Sforza's Milan in the war against Venice, while the fall of Constantinople in 1453 dealt a blow to Venetian finances. Eventually, the Peace of Lodi recognized Venetian and Florentine territorial gains and the legitimacy of the Sforza rule in Milan. The Milan-Florence alliance played a major role in stabilizing the peninsula for the next 40 years.

The political crisis of 1458 was the first serious challenge to the Medici rule. The cost of wars had been borne by the great families of Florence, and disproportionately so by Medici's opponents. A number of them (Serragli, Baroncelli, Mancini, Vespucci, Gianni) were practically ruined and had to sell their properties, and those were acquired by Medici's partisans at bargain prices. The opposition used partial relaxation of Medici control of the republic institutions to demand political reforms, freedom of speech in the councils and a greater share in the decision-making. Medici's party response was to use threats of force from private armies and Milanese troops and arranging a popular assembly dominated by Cosimo's supporters. It exiled the opponents of the regime and introduced the open vote in councils, "in order to unmask the anti-Medician rebels".

From 1458 Cosimo withdrew from any official public role, but his control of Florence was greater than ever. In the spring of 1459 he entertained the new pope Pius II, who stopped in Florence on his way to the Council of Mantua to declare a crusade against the Ottomans, and Galeazzo Maria Sforza, Francesco's son, who was to escort the pope from Florence to Mantua. In his memoirs, Pius said that Cosimo "was considered the arbiter of war and peace, the regulator of law; less a citizen than master of his city. Political councils were held in his home; the magistrates he chose were elected; he was king in all but name and legal status…. Some asserted that his tyranny was intolerable."

===== Piero de' Medici =====
Piero the Gouty was the eldest son of Cosimo. Piero, as his sobriquet the gouty implies, suffered from gout and did not enjoy good health. Lorenzo the Magnificent was Piero's eldest son by his wife Lucrezia Tornabuoni. Piero's reign furthered the always fractious political divisions of Florence when he had called up huge debts owed to the Medici Bank. These debts were owed primarily by a Florentine nobleman, Luca Pitti. Lucca called for an armed insurrection against Piero, but a co-conspirator rebutted this. Duke Francesco Sforza of Milan died in 1466, and his son Galeazzo Maria Sforza became the new Milanese duke. With the death of Francesco Sforza, Florence lost a valuable ally among the other Italian states.

In August 1466, the conspirators acted. They received support from the Duke of Ferrara, who marched troops into the Florentine countryside with the intent of deposing Piero. The coup failed. The Florentines were not willing to support it, and soon after their arrival, Ferrara's troops left the city. The conspirators were exiled for life. While the internal problems were fixed, Venice took the opportunity to invade Florentine territory in 1467. Piero appointed Federigo da Montefeltro, Lord of Urbino, to command his mercenaries. An inconclusive battle ensued, with the Venetians forces retreating. In the winter of 1469 Piero died.

===== Lorenzo de' Medici =====
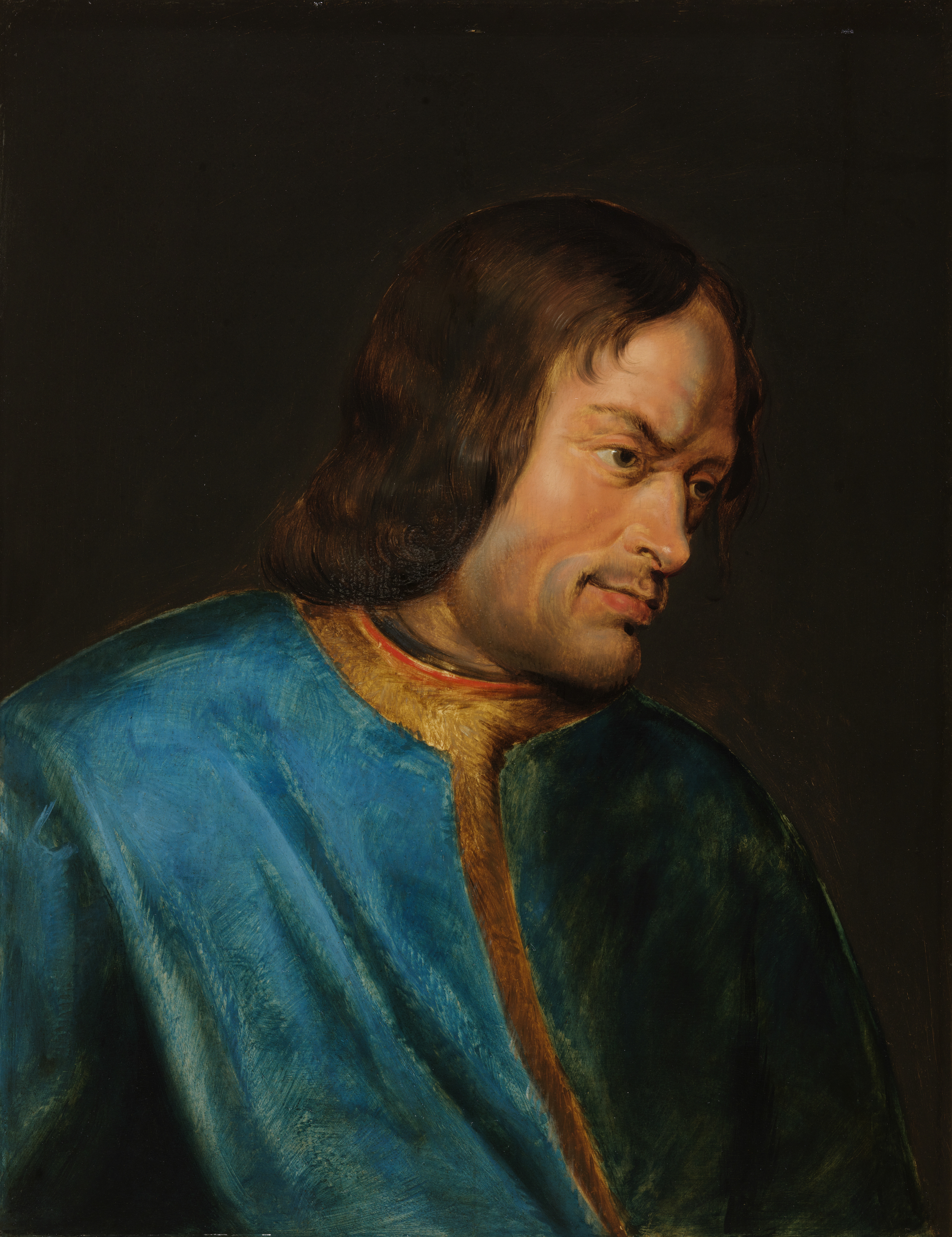
Lorenzo de' Medici

Lorenzo succeeded his father, Piero. Lorenzo, as heir, was accordingly groomed by his father to rule over Florence.

Lorenzo was the greatest artistic patron of the Renaissance. He patronised Leonardo da Vinci, Michelangelo and Botticelli, among others. During Lorenzo's reign, the Renaissance truly descended on Florence. Lorenzo commissioned a multitude of amazing pieces of art and also enjoyed collecting fine gems. Lorenzo had many children with his wife Clarice Orsini, including the future Pope Leo X and his eventual successor in Florence, Piero the Unfortunate.

Lorenzo's brother Giuliano was killed before his own eyes in the Pazzi conspiracy of 1478. This plot was instigated by the Pazzi family. The coup was unsuccessful, and the conspirators were executed in a very violent manner. The scheme was supported by the Archbishop of Pisa, Francesco Salviati, who was also executed in his ceremonial robes. News of this sacrilege reached Pope Sixtus IV (who had also supported the conspiracy against the Medicis). Sixtus IV was "outraged" and excommunicated everyone in Florence. Sixtus sent a papal delegation to Florence to arrest Lorenzo. The people of Florence were obviously enraged by the Pope's actions, and the local clergy too. The populace refused to surrender Lorenzo to the papal delegation. A war followed, which lasted for two years until Lorenzo tactfully went about diplomatically securing a peace. Lorenzo died in 1492 and was succeeded by his son Piero.

===== Piero 'the Unfortunate' =====
Piero ruled Florence for a mere two years. Charles VIII of France invaded Italy in September 1494. He demanded passage through Florence to Naples, where he intended to secure the throne for himself. Piero met Charles at the fringes of Florence to try and negotiate. Piero capitulated to all Charles' demands, and upon arriving back in the city in November, he was branded as a traitor. He was forced to flee the republic with his family.

==== Savonarola ====
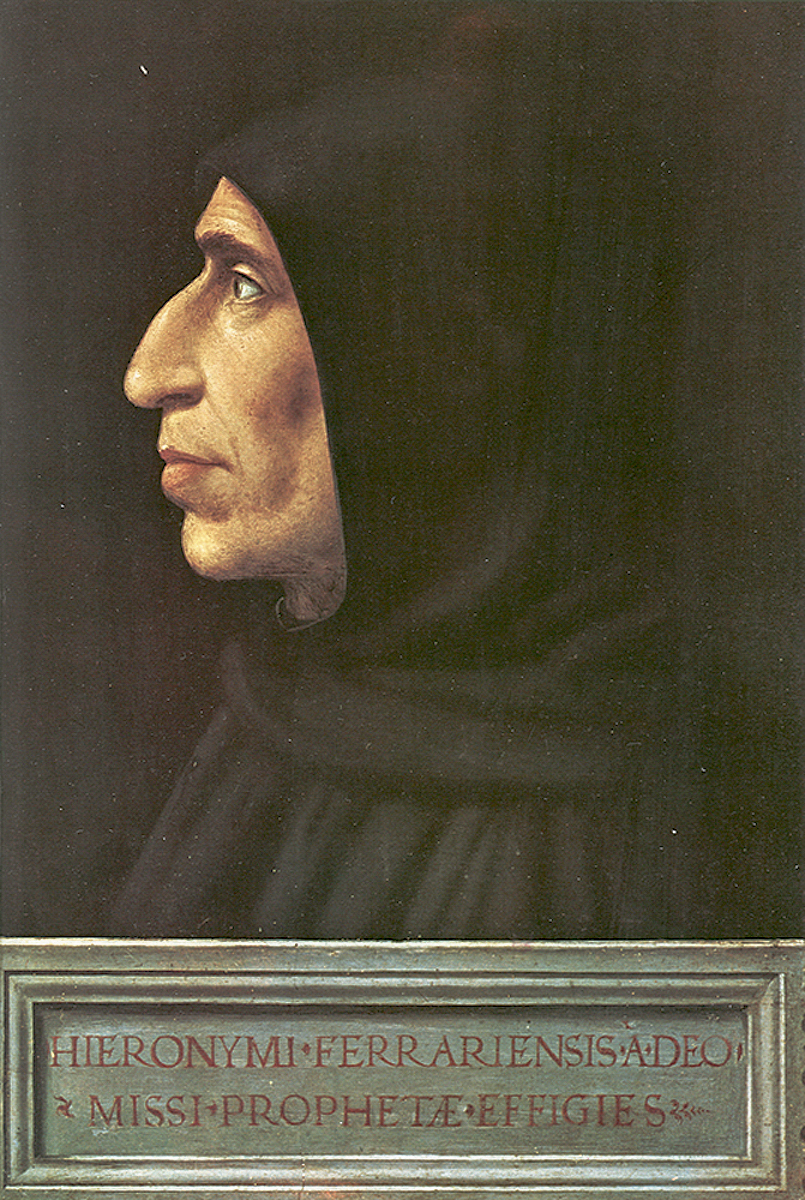
Girolamo Savonarola

After the fall of the Medici, Girolamo Savonarola ruled the state. Savonarola was a priest from Ferrara. He came to Florence in the 1480s. By proclaiming predictions and through vigorous preaching, he won the people to his cause. Savonarola's new government ushered in democratic reforms. It allowed many exiles back into Florence, who were banished by the Medici. Savonarola's ulterior goal, however, was to transform Florence into a "city of God". Florentines stopped wearing garish colours, and many women took oaths to become nuns. Savonarola became most famous for his "Bonfire of the Vanities", where he ordered all "vanities" to be gathered and burned. These included wigs, perfume, paintings, and ancient pagan manuscripts. Savonarola's rule collapsed a year later. He was excommunicated by Pope Alexander VI in late 1497. In the same year, Florence embarked on a war with Pisa, which had been de facto independent since Charles VIII's invasion three years before. The endeavour failed miserably, and this led to food shortages. That, in turn, led to a few isolated cases of the plague. The people blamed Savonarola for their woes, and he was tortured and executed in the Piazza della Signoria by being burned at the stake by Florentine authorities, in May 1498.

=== 16th century ===
==== Piero Soderini ====
In 1502, the Florentines chose Piero Soderini as their first ruler for life. Soderini succeeded where Savonarola had failed, when the Secretary of War, Niccolò Machiavelli, recaptured Pisa in 1509. It was at this time that Machiavelli introduced a standing army in Florence, replacing the traditional use of hired mercenaries.

==== Giovanni de' Medici ====
Soderini was repudiated in September 1512, when Cardinal Giovanni de' Medici captured Florence with Papal troops during the War of the League of Cambrai. The Medici rule of Florence was thus restored.

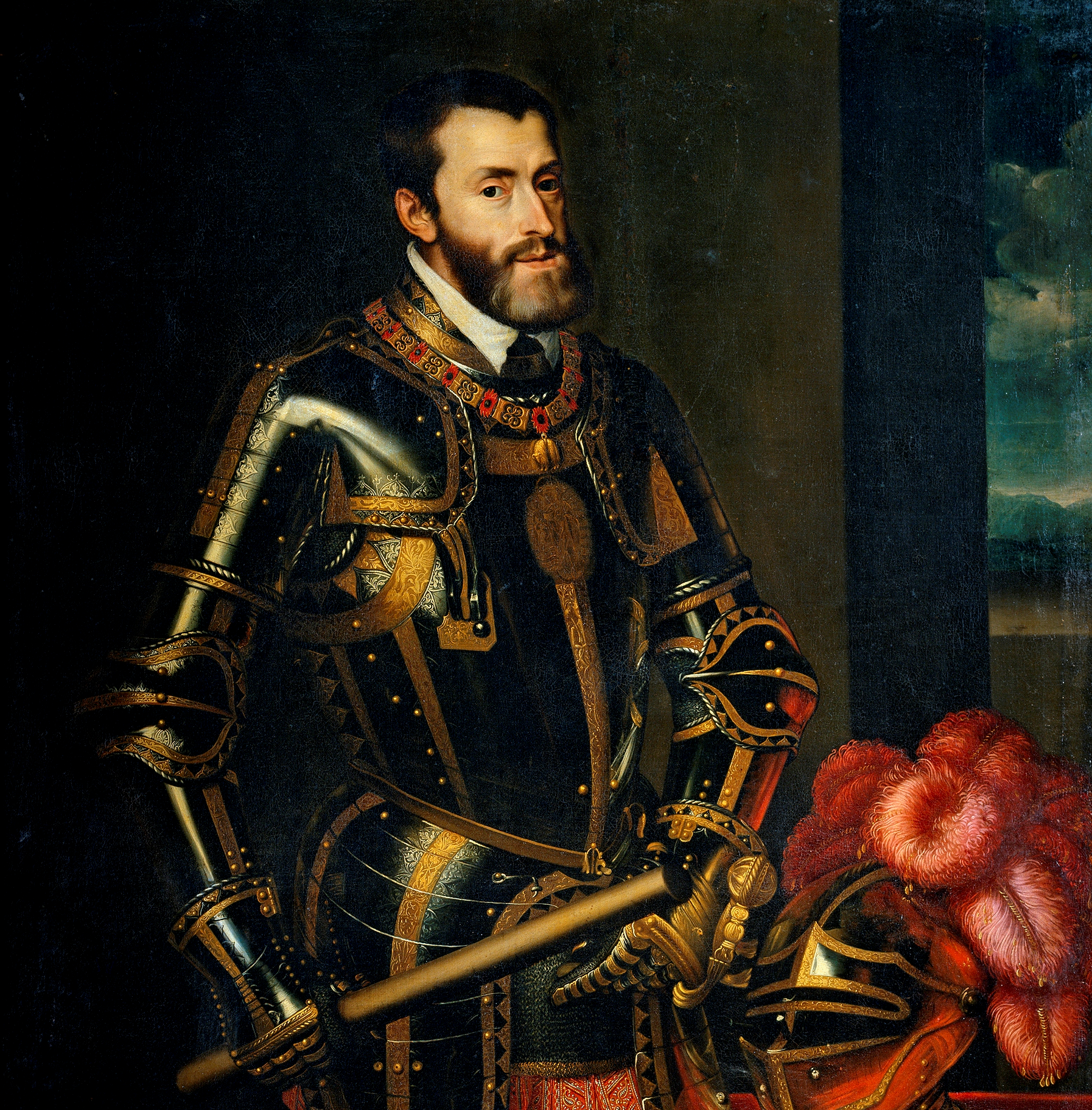
Holy Roman Emperor Charles V

Soon after retaking Florence, Cardinal Giovanni de' Medici was recalled to Rome. Pope Julius II had just died, and he needed to be present for the ensuing Papal conclave. Giovanni was elected Pope, taking the name Leo X. This effectively brought the Papal States and Florence into a political union. Leo X ruled Florence by proxy, first appointing his brother Giuliano de' Medici to rule in his stead, and then in 1516, replacing Giuliano with his nephew, Lorenzo II de' Medici.

Lorenzo II's government proved unpopular in Florence. According to U.S. President and historian John Adams, "at this time the citizens of the state of Florence were in secret very discontented, because the Duke Lorenzo, desiring to reduce the government to the form of a principality, appeared to disdain to consult any longer with the magistrates and his fellow-citizens as he used to do, and gave audiences very seldom, and with much impatience; he attended less to the business of the city, and caused all public affairs to be managed by Messer Goro da Pistoia, his secretary." In 1519, Lorenzo died from syphilis, shortly before his wife gave birth to Catherine de' Medici, the future Queen of France.

==== Giulio de' Medici ====
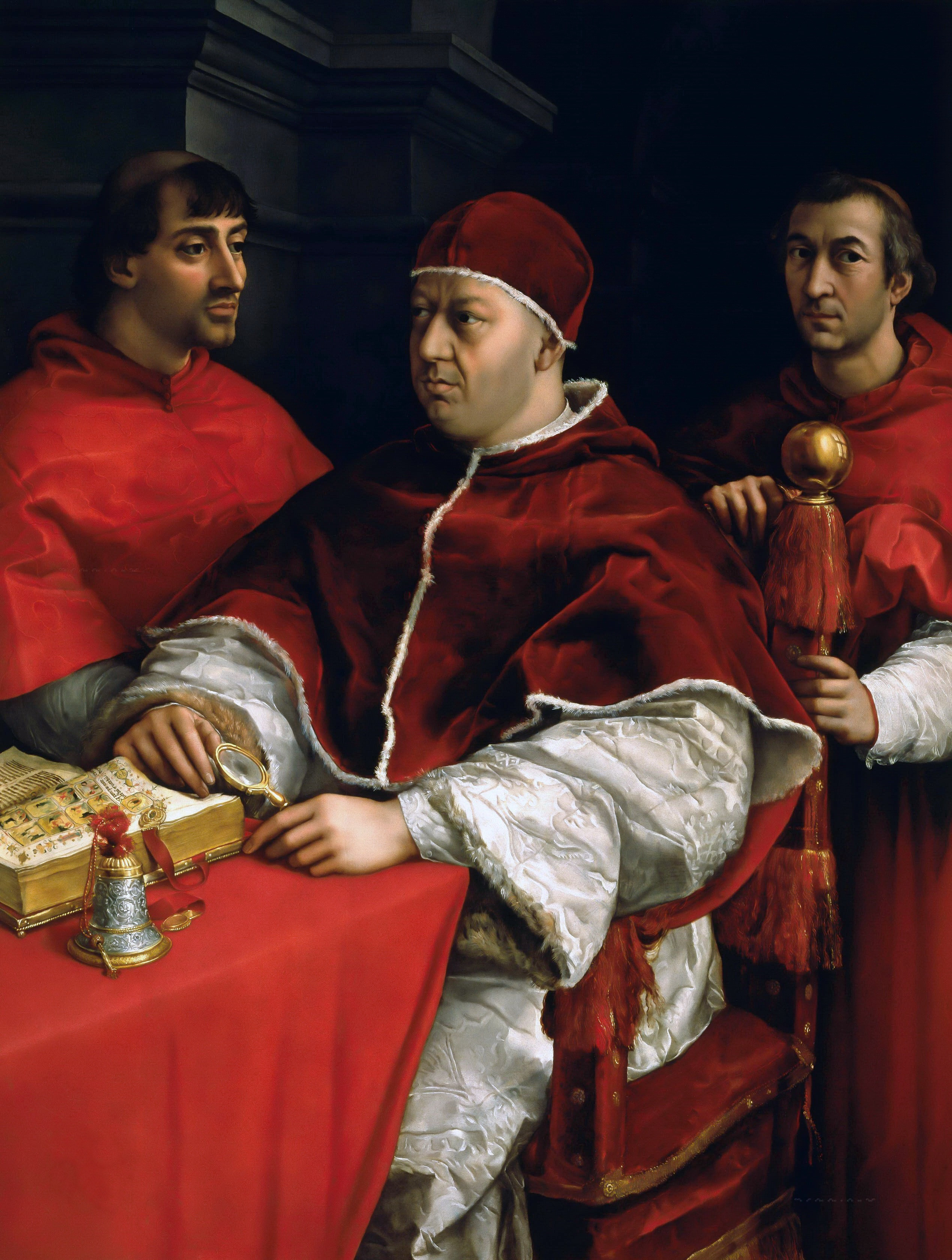
Leo X (center) and Cardinal Giulio de' Medici (left)

Following the death of Lorenzo II, Cardinal Giulio de' Medici governed Florence until 1523, when he was elected Pope Clement VII. U.S. President John Adams later characterized his administration of Florence as "very successful and frugal." Adams chronicles Cardinal Giulio as having "reduced the business of the magistrates, elections, customs of office, and the mode of expenditure of public money, in such a manner that it produced a great and universal joy among the citizens."

On the death of Pope Leo X in 1521, Adams writes there was a "ready inclination in all of the principal citizens [of Florence], and a universal desire among the people, to maintain the state in the hands of the Cardinal de' Medici; and all this felicity arose from his good government, which since the death of the Duke Lorenzo, had been universally agreeable."

When Cardinal Giulio was elected Pope Clement VII, he appointed Ippolito de' Medici and Alessandro de' Medici to rule Florence, under the guardianship of Cardinal Passerini. Ippolito was the son of Giuliano de' Medici, while Alessandro was allegedly the son of Clement VII. Cardinal Passerini's regency government proved highly unpopular.

In May 1527, Rome was sacked by the Holy Roman Empire. The city was destroyed, and Pope Clement VII was imprisoned. During the tumult, a faction of Republicans drove out the Medici from Florence. A new wave of Puritanism swept through the city. Many new restricting fundamentalist laws were passed.

In 1529, Clement VII signed the Treaty of Barcelona with Charles V, under which Charles would, in exchange for the Pope's blessing, invade Florence and restore the Medici. They were restored after a protracted siege.

=== "Dukes of the Republic of Florence" ===
Following the Republic's surrender in the Siege of Florence, Charles V, Holy Roman Emperor issued a proclamation explicitly stating that he and he alone could determine the government of Florence. On 12 August 1530, the Emperor created the Medici hereditary rulers (capo) of the Republic of Florence. The title "Duke of the Florentine Republic" was chosen because it would bolster Medici power in the region.

==== Alessandro de' Medici ====
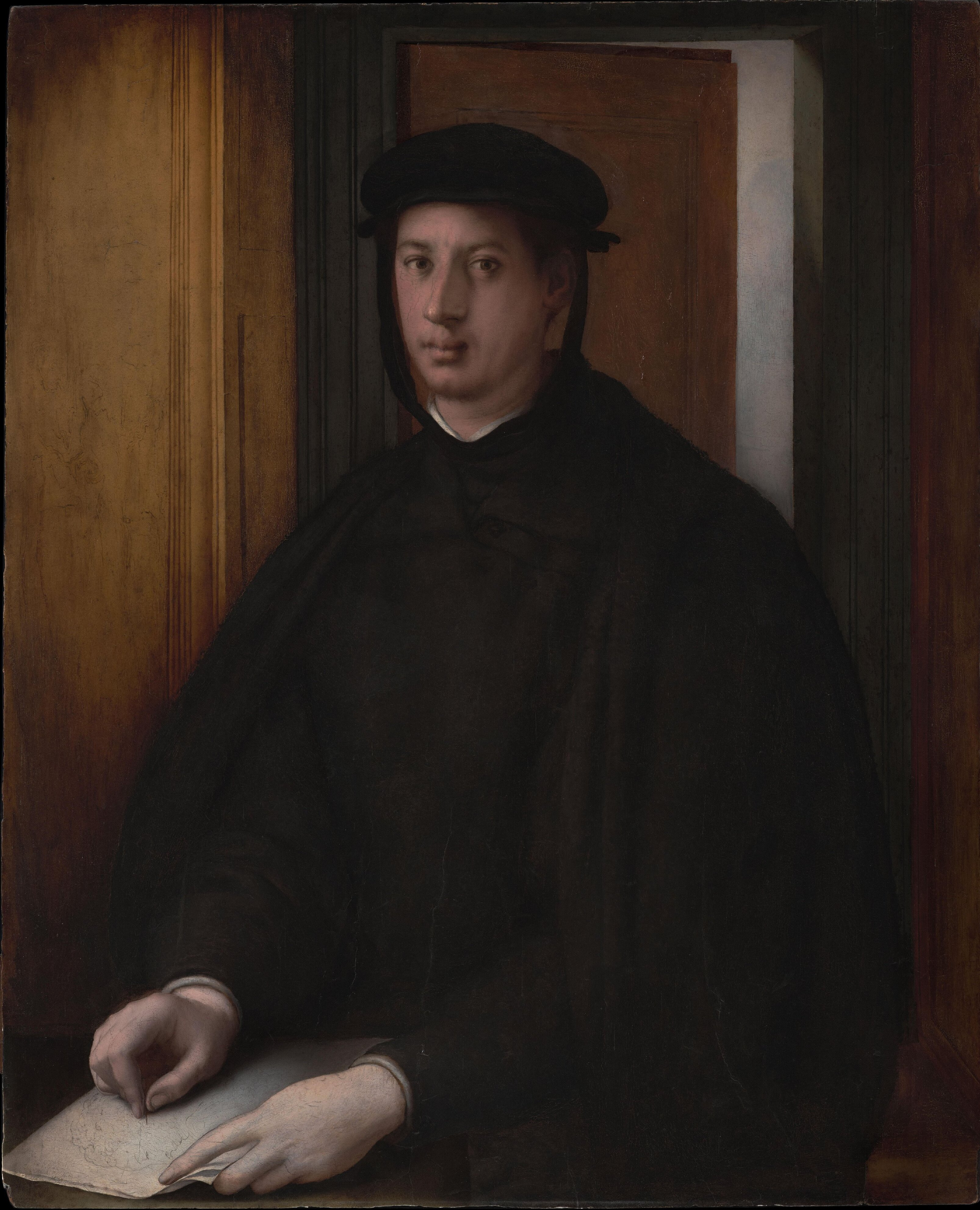
Alessandro de' Medici

Pope Clement VII intended his relative Alessandro de' Medici (Note: Allessandro is usually considered an illegitimate son of Lorenzo II, Duke of Urbino, though some historians suggest that Clement himself was the father.) to be the ruler of Florence, but also wanted to give the impression that the Florentines had democratically chosen Alessandro as their ruler. Even after Alessandro's accession in 1530 (he reigned as Duke of the Florentine Republic from 1532 on), Imperial troops remained stationed in Florence. In 1535, several prominent Florentine families, including the Pazzi (who attempted to kill Lorenzo de' Medici in the Pazzi Conspiracy) dispatched a delegation under Ippolito de' Medici, asking Charles V to depose Alessandro. Much to their dismay, the Emperor rejected their appeal. Charles had no intention of deposing Alessandro, who was married to Charles' daughter Margaret of Parma.

Alessandro continued to rule Florence for another two years until he was murdered on 1 January 1537 by his distant relative Lorenzino de' Medici.

==== Cosimo I de' Medici ====
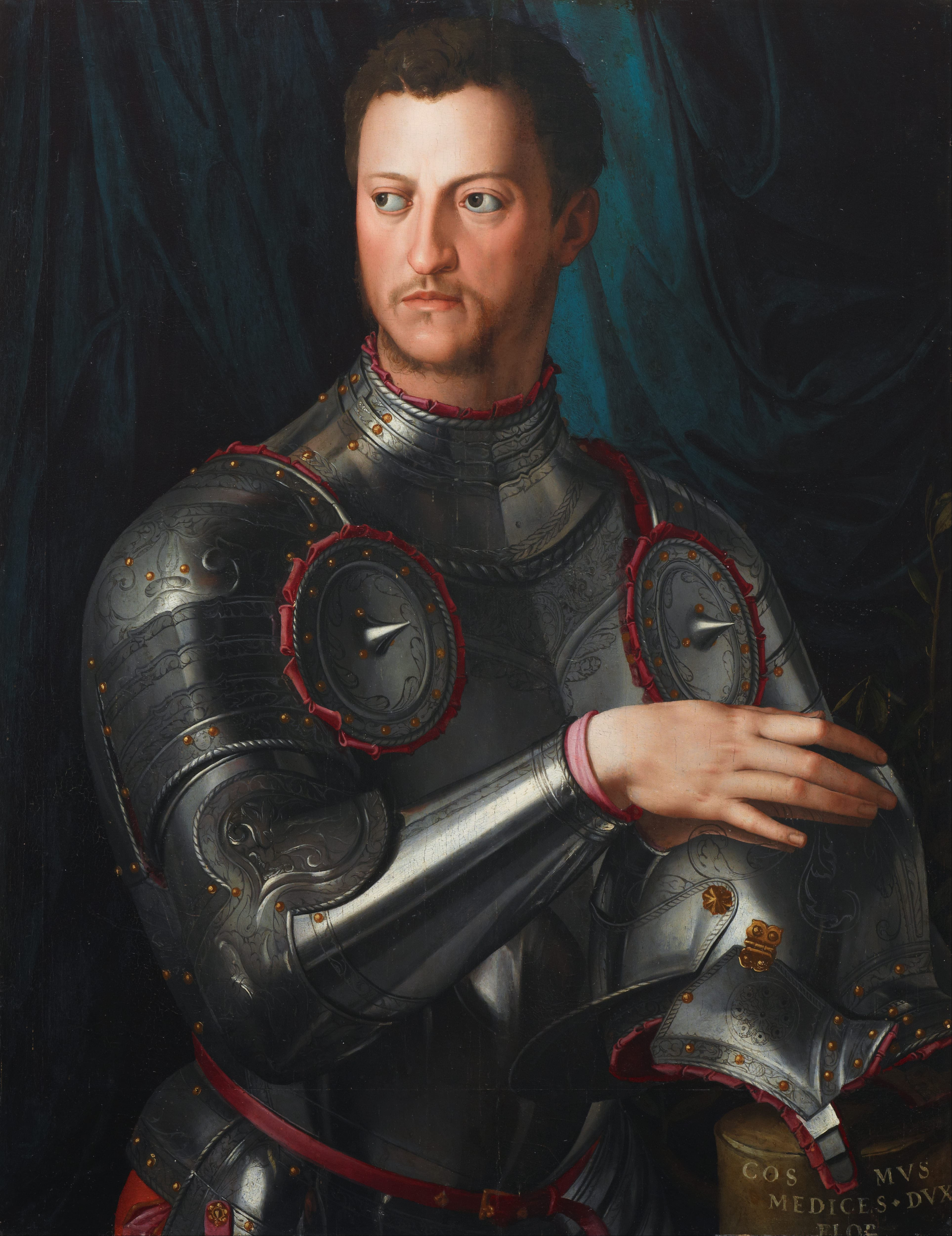
Cosimo I de' Medici

As Alessandro left no legitimate issue, the question of succession was open. Florentine authorities selected Cosimo I in 1537. At the news of this, the exiled Strozzi family invaded and tried to depose Cosimo, but were defeated at Montemurlo. Cosimo completely overhauled the bureaucracy and administration of Florence. In 1542, the Imperial troops stationed in Florence by Charles V were withdrawn.

In 1548, Cosimo was given a part of the Island of Elba by Charles V, and based his new developing navy there. Cosimo founded the port city of Livorno and allowed the city's inhabitants to enjoy freedom of religion. In alliance with Spain and the Holy Roman Empire, Cosimo defeated the Republic of Siena, which was allied with France, in the Battle of Marciano on 2 August 1554. On 17 April 1555, Florence and Spain occupied the territory of Siena, which, in July 1557 Philip II of Spain bestowed on Cosimo as a hereditary fiefdom. The ducal family moved into the Palazzo Pitti in 1560. Cosimo commissioned the architect Vasari to build the Uffizi, as offices for the Medici bank, continuing the Medici tradition of patronage of the arts.

=== End of the Republic ===
In 1569, Cosimo was elevated to the rank of the Grand Duke of Tuscany by Pope Pius V. This marks the end of the Florence Republic, and the beginning of the Grand Duchy of Tuscany.

Medici rule continued into the Grand Duchy of Tuscany until the family became extinct in 1737.

== Administrations of the Republic ==
Florence was governed by a council called the signoria, which consisted of nine men. The head of the signoria was the gonfaloniere, who was chosen every two months in a lottery, as was his signoria. To be eligible, one had to have sound finances, no arrears or bankruptcies, he had to be older than thirty, had to be a member of Florence's seven main guilds (merchant traders, bankers, two clothe guilds, and judges). The lottery was often pre-determined, and the results were usually favourable to influential families. The roster of names in the lottery were replaced every five years.

The main organs of government were known as the tre maggiori. They were: the twelve good men, the standard bearers of the gonfaloniere, and the signoria. The first two debated and ratified proposed legislation, but could not introduce it. The gonfaloniere's initial two month-term in office was expanded upon the fall of Savonarola in 1498, to life, much like that of the Venetian doge. The signoria held meetings each day in the Palazzo della Signoria. Various committees controlled particular aspects of government, e.g. the Committee of War. For administrative purposes, Florence was divided into four districts, which were divided into four sub-districts. The main purpose of these counties was to ease the gathering of local militias.

To hold an elective office, one had to be of a family that had previously held office. The Medici family effectively ruled Florence on a hereditary basis, from 1434 to 1494, and 1512–1527.

After Alessandro de' Medici was installed as the "Duke of the Florentine Republic" in 1530, in April 1532, Pope Clement VII convinced the Balía, Florence's ruling commission, to draw up a new constitution, which formally created a hereditary monarchy. It abolished the age-old signoria (elective government) and the office of gonfaloniere (titular head-of-state elected for a two-month term) and replaced it with three institutions:

- the consigliere, a four-man council elected for a three-month term, headed by the "Duke of the Florentine Republic".
- the Senate, composed of forty-eight men, chosen by the Balía, was vested with the prerogative of determining Florence's financial, security, and foreign policies. Additionally, the senate appointed the commissions of war and public security, and the governors of Pisa, Arezzio, Prato, Voltera and Cortona and ambassadors.
- the Council of Two Hundred was a petitions court; membership was for life.

== Flags and coats of arms ==
Flags of the Republic

Ghibelline civil flag (11th century - 1251)

Guelph civil flag (since 1251)

State flag (1251 - 1569)

Flag of the Capitano del popolo (1251 - 1569) and the Gonfaloniere of Justice (1293 - 1569)

Flag in use during the rule of Walter VI of Brienne, Duke of Athens (1342 - 1343)
Flags of the Sestieri (1173 - 1343)

Oltrarno

San Piero Scheraggio

Borgo Santi Apostoli

San Brancazio

Porta del Duomo

Porta San Pietro
Flags of the Quartieri (since 1343)

Santa Maria Novella

San Giovanni

Santo Spirito

Santa Croce
Coats of Arms

Guelph civil arms (since 1251)

Ghibelline civil arms (11th century - 1251)

State arms (1125 - 1569)

Arms of the People of Florence

Arms of the Masters of the Guilds of Florence

Arms of the Church in Florence

== See also ==
- Grand Duchy of Tuscany
- Guilds of Florence
- Lords and Dukes of Florence

== Sources ==
- Crum, Roger J.; Paoletti, John T., eds. (2008). Renaissance Florence: A Social History. Cambridge: Cambridge University Press. ISBN 978-0-521-72787-7.
- Fletcher, Catherine (2016). The Black Prince of Florence: The Spectacular Life and Treacherous World of Alessandro de' Medici. London: The Bodley Head. ISBN 978-1-84792-269-4.
- Goudriaan, Elisa (2018). Florentine Patricians and Their Networks: Structures Behind the Cultural Success and the Political Representation of the Medici Court (1600-1660). Leiden ; Boston: Brill. ISBN 978-90-04-34652-9.
- Hale, J. R. (2001) [1977]. Florence and the Medici. London: Phoenix. ISBN 978-1-84212-456-7.
- Hattendorf, John B.; Unger, Richard W., eds. (2003). War at Sea in the Middle Ages and the Renaissance. Woodbridge, Suffolk, UK: Boydell Press. ISBN 978-0-85115-903-4.
- Landon, William J. (2013). Lorenzo di Filippo Strozzi and Niccolo Machiavelli: Patron, Client, and the Pistola fatta per la peste/An Epistle Written Concerning the Plague. Toronto: University of Toronto Press. ISBN 978-1-4426-4424-3.
- Langdon, Gabrielle (2006). Medici Women: Portraits of Power, Love and Betrayal from the Court of Duke Cosimo I. Toronto: University of Toronto Press. ISBN 978-0-8020-3825-8.
- Najemy, John M. (2006). A History of Florence 1200-1575. Malden, MA: Blackwell Publishers. ISBN 978-1-4051-1954-2.
- Strathern, Paul (2007) [2003]. The Medici: Godfathers of the Renaissance. London: Vintage Books. ISBN 978-0-099-52297-3.
- van Veen, Henk Th. (2013). Cosimo I De' Medici and His Self-Representation in Florentine Art and Culture. Cambridge: Cambridge University Press. ISBN 978-1-107-61931-9.
