= Portrait of Ippolito de' Medici =

Painting by Titian

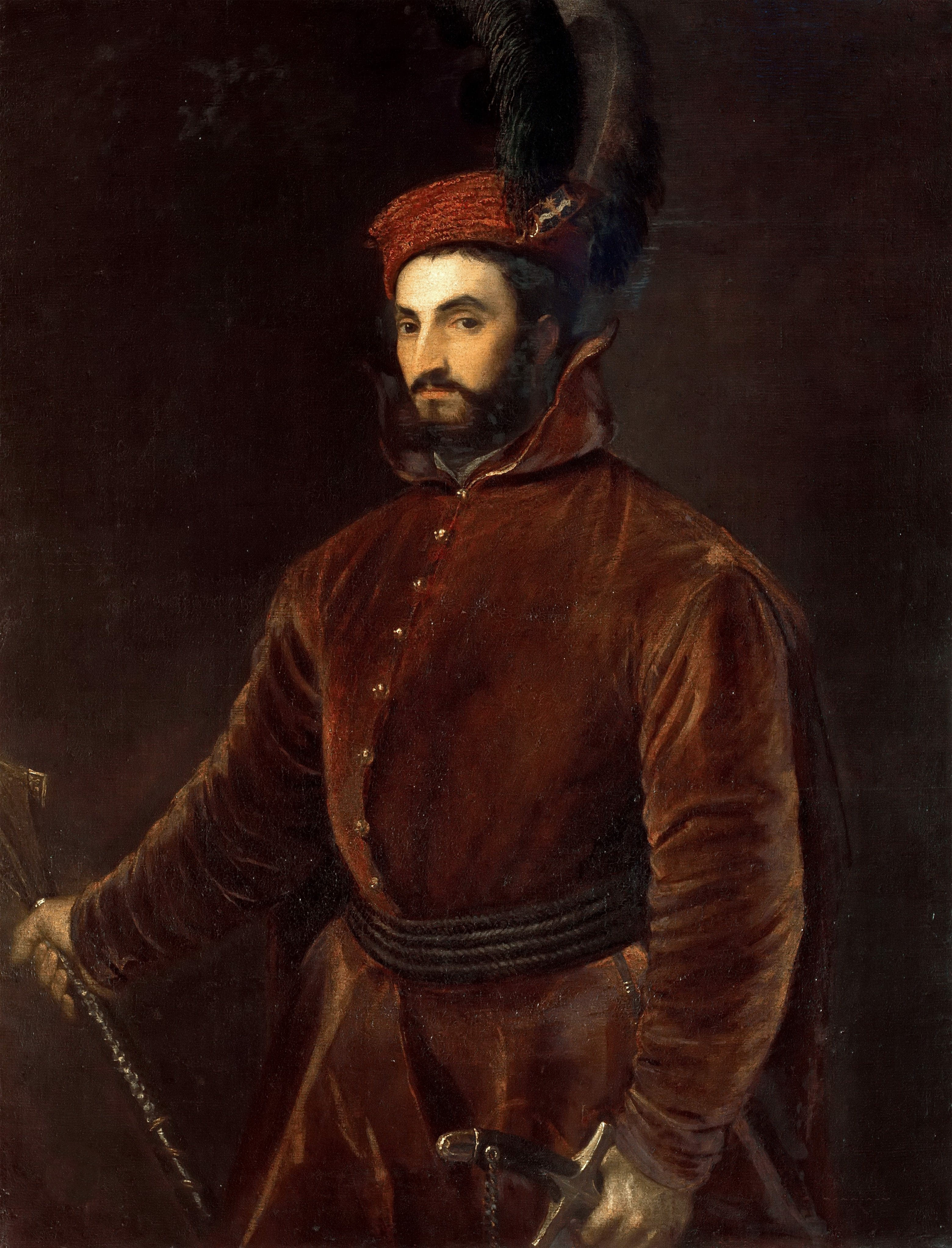
- Artist: Titian
- Year: 1532–1533
- Medium: Oil on canvas
- Dimensions: 139 cm × 107 cm (55 in × 42 in)
- Location: Palazzo Pitti, Florence

The Portrait of Ippolito de' Medici is an oil on canvas portrait of Ippolito de' Medici by Titian, from 1532–1533. It is held now in the Palazzo Pitti, in Florence. He appears dressed in a Hungarian outfit.

== History and description ==
Ippolito de' Medici, son of Giuliano de' Medici, Duke of Nemours, and nephew of Pope Clement VII, was appointed a cardinal at the age of 18, but as he matured he realized that he was more inclined to war than to Church affairs. This is evident in the current portrait that Titian painted of him in 1533, possibly in Bologna, as reported by Giorgio Vasari, or in Venice, as a source found in 2000 would testify.

The protagonist appears dressed as a Hungarian horseman, in memory of his exploits against the Turks (though he couldn't possibly have been present in Vienna during the siege by the Turks in 1529, since he had just been made a cardinal as well as archbishop of Avignon; in this capacity, he was in Bologna to attend the meeting between Pope Clement VII and Charles of Habsburg in November 1529, followed by the coronation of Charles V on February 24, 1530).

Ippolito was sent to Hungary in the spring of 1532 as Papal Legate, departing from Rome on 8 July, 1532, according to the diaries of the Italian literatus Pietro Aretino. There, he demonstrated a talent for soldiering, leading 8,000 Hungarian soldiers against the Ottoman Turks. When the Emperor returned to Italy early in 1533, Cardinal Ippolito followed him. With the help of Aretino, he summoned Titian from Venice to Bologna in 1530 to work for Charles V, with no immediate result. When Titian returned to Bologna for the Emperor’s second visit in 1533, he realized both the portrait of the Emperor with a Dog (Prado) and the portrait of Ippolito de’ Medici in Hungarian Costume (Palazzo Pitti).

From Vasari it is also known that Ippolito had a second and smaller portrait of himself made by Titian, in armor, which didn't survive.[2]

Against a dark background, the extraordinary accords of dark reds, purples and amaranths highlight the perfectly illuminated face, where the expression of Ippolito seems to have something of confidence and cruelty, suitable for a young leader. With a warlike attitude, he holds the baton of command, while his left hand rests on the hilt of his sword.

The portrait was used as a model for various printed reproductions. Since 1716 it has been registered at Pitti, where it passed through various rooms before arriving at the Mars room, where it still hangs.

== See also ==
- List of works by Titian
