= Duke of the Florentine Republic =

Title of the Ruler of the Florentine Republic

The ducal coronet used by the Italian states.

The Duca della Repubblica Fiorentina, rendered in English as Duke of the Florentine Republic or Duke of the Republic of Florence, was a title created in 1532 by Pope Clement VII for the Medici family (his own family), which ruled the Republic of Florence. There were effectively only two dukes of the Republic of Florence, Alessandro de' Medici and Cosimo de' Medici, the second duke being elevated to Grand Duke of Tuscany, causing the Florentine title to become subordinate to the greater Tuscan title.

== History ==
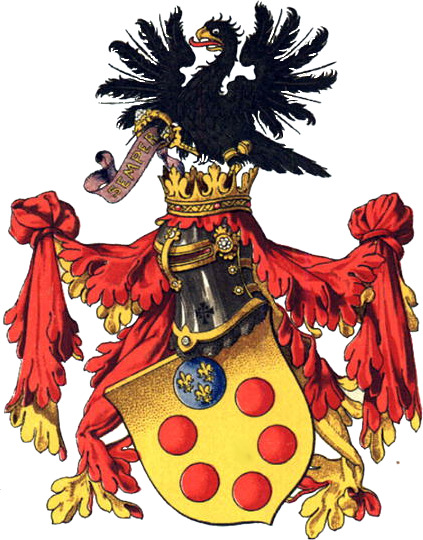
The heraldic achievement of the Medici, the family to which the two Dukes of the Florentine Republic belonged.

In 1532, Pope Clement VII, who was born Giulio di Giuliano de' Medici, appointed Alessandro de' Medici as duke over the Republic of Florence, the Medici family having acted as de facto rulers over the city of Florence since 1434 when Cosimo "the Elder" de' Medici (also known by his supporters as Pater Patriae, or "Father of the Country"), returned to the city from his short-lived exile in the Republic of Venice by the Alberti and Strozzi families who were also political rivals of the Medici family. The duchy would bolster Medici power and influence in the region, which had just a few years prior been restored by Charles V, Holy Roman Emperor after political upheaval against the Medici pope and Medici rulers of Florence in 1527. Alessandro is also believed by historians to have been the illegitimate son of either Pope Clement VII or Lorenzo II de' Medici, Duke of Urbino.

In 1535, a delegation of Florentine nobles, which included the Pazzi family who previously conspired to assassinate Lorenzo de' Medici and was headed by Alessandro’s cousin Ippolito de' Medici, sought to gain the assistance of Emperor Charles V to depose Alessandro. Charles rejected the delegations’ appeals, as Alessandro had been wedded to the emperor's daughter Margaret of Parma.

Alessandro ruled as duke less than four years, being assassinated by Lorenzino de' Medici on 6 January 1537. With no legitimate issue, Cosimo de' Medici was chosen to succeed his distant relative by Florentine officials. Cosimo completely overhauled the bureaucracy and administration of Florence, and, in 1542, the Imperial Armed Forces stationed in Florence by Charles V were withdrawn.

On 17 April 1555, Florentine and Spanish forces occupied the Republic of Siena after a brief conflict. Philip II of Spain bestowed the territory on Cosimo as a hereditary fiefdom in July 1557. In 1548, Cosimo purchased Elba from the Republic of Genoa and based his new developing navy there. Cosimo founded the port city of Livorno and allowed the city’s inhabitants to enjoy freedom of religion. The ducal family moved into the Palazzo Pitti in 1560. Cosimo commissioned the architect Vasari to build the Uffizi as offices for the Medici bank. Finally, Cosimo was elevated to The Grand Duke of Tuscany in 1569 by Pope Pius V. This effectively ended the Duchy of Florence, which became subordinate to the more elevated grand ducal title. The Medici continued to rule over Florence and Tuscany until their extinction in 1737 after the death of Gian Gastone de' Medici, who had no children.

== The Dukes ==
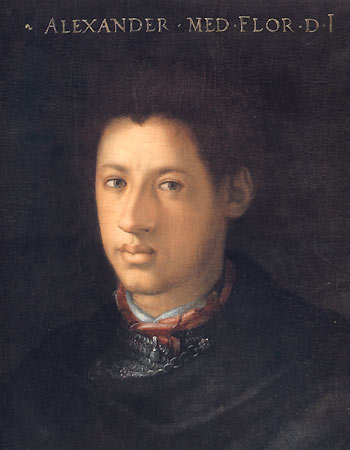

Alessandro de' Medici

Birth: 22 July 1510
Death: 6 January 1537
Reign: 1532 – 6 January 1537
Created the first Duke of the Florentine Republic in 1532 and reigned until his assassination on 6 January 1537. Alessandro died without legitimate issue, causing Florentine officials to select the next duke.

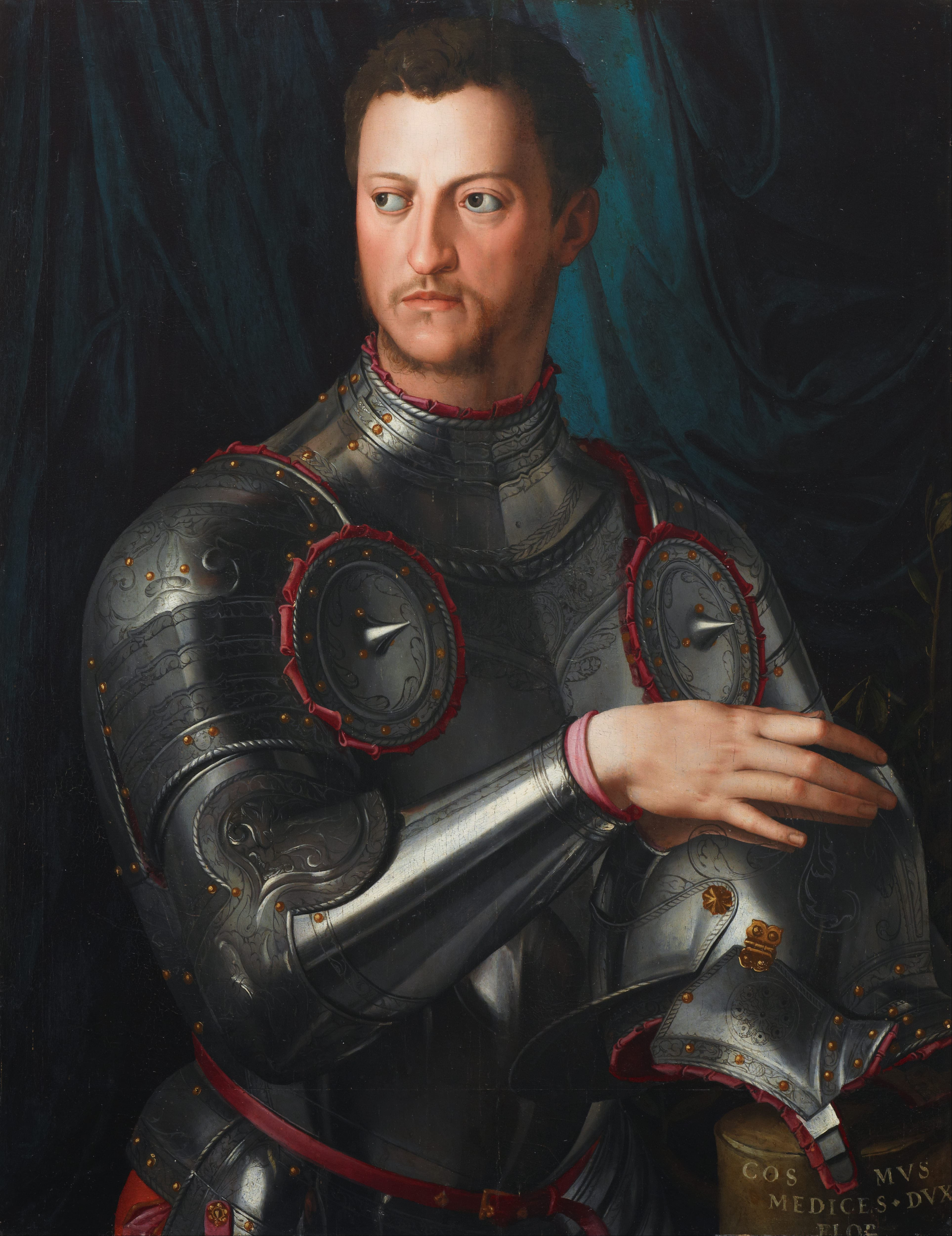

Cosimo de' Medici

Birth: 15 June 1519
Death: 21 April 1574
Reign: 1537–1574
Selected to succeed as second Duke of the Florentine Republic in 1537, reigning until his abdication in early 1574 in favour of his son, Francesco I de' Medici. From 1569 on, he was known as Cosimo I and created the first Grand Duke of Tuscany, which became the ruling title used by his successors.

== See also ==
- Republic of Florence, for the state that preceded the duchy
- Grand Duchy of Tuscany, for the state which succeeded the duchy
- House of Medici, for the noble family to which the dukes belonged
- Rulers of Florence and Tuscany, a comprehensive list of rulers over the city and region
