= Ferdinand Schevill =

American historian (1868–1954)

Ferdinand Schevill (1868– December 10, 1954, Tucson, Arizona) was an American historian.

He graduated from Yale University in 1889 and finished his PhD at Freiburg in 1892. That same year he arrived at the University of Chicago, where he taught from 1892 to 1937.

Schevill’s first book, a textbook on Western European history, was Political History of Europe from 1500 to the Present Day. It was revised and reissued many times. In 1922 he publishedThe History of the Balkan Peninsula: From the Earliest Times to the Present Day. Schevill retired in 1924. In 1930 he reentered the University in the Humanities General Course of general education. He retired five years later to finish The History of Florence (1936).

Schevill continued to research, and in his eightieth year he went from the University of Chicago to lecture in Frankfurt. During this period, Schevill specialized in the historiographies of famous writers from the Renaissance.

He was brother-in-law to the sculptor Karl Bitter.

== Partial Bibliography ==
- Siena: The History of a Medieval Commune. Charles Scribner's sons. 1909 – via Internet Archive.
- Germany and the Peace of Europe (1914)
- The Rise and Progress of Democracy (1915)
- Karl Bitter: A Biography (1917)
- A History of Europe: From the Reformation to the Present Day (1925)
- The First Century of Italian Humanism (1928)
- The History of Florence. New York: Harcourt, Brace and Company. 1936. — reprinted as Medieval and Renaissance Florence (1965)
- The Great Elector (1947)
- The Medici (1949)
- Six Historians (The University of Chicago Press, 1956)
