= Felice Le Monnier =

Felice Le Monnier (born Verdun, 1 December 1806 – died in Florence, 27 June 1884) was an Italian publisher of French origin, founder of Le Monnier publishing house. He is considered one of the first modern publishers, as he viewed publishing as a commercial enterprise and was the first among his peers to pay royalties to employees and authors even before the official copyright law was enacted.

== Biography ==
=== Early years ===
Born in France to Jean Le Monnier and Jeanne Michaud. In his letter book, , Felice Le Monnier described his background briefly:

I was born in Verdun, in the month of December 1806. My father, Jean, then garrisoned in Verdun, had married there a young lady, Jeanne Michaud, daughter of a watchmaker. These details will be enough for you, I hope: I would not be able to give you any others."

— letter no. 744, 1 May 1863

he started his military career, whose rigid discipline, however, was ill-suited to his free and inharmonious character. He fled from the Enrico IV school in Paris, and then was expelled.

His father, to punishment him and to train him in a profession, entrusted him to a family friend who headed a print shop in Paris. He was trained as a typist and then became a printer.

He left Paris after taking part in the 1830 strikes against the reactionary laws of Charles X and arrived in Florence as a stopover on his way to Greece, where he planned to establish a new publishing company with a friend. The sudden death of the partner with whom he had planned the venture and his fortunate hiring by the printer Pietro Borghi prompted him to stay in Florence, giving him the opportunity to launch first a major printing business and later a publishing house.

=== Relocation to Florence ===
In 1837 he founded with Borghi la Felice Le Monnier and C. It is the origin of the historic Le Monnier publishing house, still active today within the publishing group Mondadori. The new company for the first years worked as a simple typography, in 1937 they published the Divine Comedy. The company was still financed by Pietro and Giuseppe Borghi. Three years later, the profits generated by numerous printing commissions and a loan from bookseller Stefano Jouhaud enabled Le Monnier to take full ownership of the company for 4,000 Tuscan lire. In 1841 the first book chosen, chosen and promoted by Felice, was released: the Speeches on the Italian stories of Giuseppe Borghi.

The first great commercial success, the Arnaldo da Brescia by Giovan Battista Niccolini (1843), was perfectly in line with these premises, and there is no shortage of attention to Grand Ducal censorship. Niccolini's drama inaugurated the "National Library", a prestigious series from the rigorous pink covers that soon became the instrument of Le Monnier's cultural policy and the source of its greatest commercial success.

In the following decades, Le Monnier, while never interrupting the printing business on behalf of third parties (practices, among other things, common to all 19th century Italian publishers), built one of the most prestigious editorials in Italy, always coherently guided by a precise and modern philosophy, at the same time commercial and cultural. The Monnier was addressing the new broad public of the middle classes, the new emerging, unity and patriotic bourgeoisie. His choices followed the design, clear from the beginning, to publish works that would satisfy, as he himself stated, "the political concept and the literary criterion", that they associate patriotic spirit and artistic value. Frenchman Le Monnier then became a protagonist of the Risorgimento feelings of moderate Italy.

The National Library did not exhaust the editorial activity of Le Monnier, which printed periodicals and newspapers, both on behalf of third parties (La Patria) and on its own (The Gazette of the People, with an independent, unified, monarchical program). Intriguing intuitions and intended to develop in the future of the Le Monnier editorial brand, to this day, were the publication of dictionaries (from the vocabulary of the Italian language by Pietro Fanfani of 1855) and of school books (since 1856).

=== The Case of the Promessi Sposi ===
In 1845 Le Monnier republished the The Betrothed in the edition of Passigli of 1832, without the permission of Alessandro Manzoni (who had published the final edition in the meantime). From this episode was born a long cause that ended only in 1864, with the full victory of Manzoni. The issue was complicated because in 1840, as the various editions of the novel were being published, a new copyright law had gone into effect in some states on the Italian peninsula. Le Monnier and his defence argued that if we speak of “ownership” with regard to intellectual works, then such a right exists only by virtue of the law and not by nature. Therefore, editions published before 1840, those preceding the law, were not protected, and Le Monnier was right to share the fine novel in its first version.

In addition to this famous episode, which attracted the attention of leading jurists, Le Monnier, following a widespread custom at the time especially among small publishers, printed pirate editions of other works, including Margherita Pusterla by Cesare Cantù and Marco Visconti by Tommaso Grossi.

Nevertheless, the scholars Alberto Cadioli and Giuliano Vigini in Storia dell'editoria in Italia dall'Unità a oggi (2018) describe Le Monnier as the first contemporary publisher as he was the first to pay his collaborators and especially authors at a time when copyright was not yet officially recognised.

=== Late years ===
In 1865, disappointed by the new climate of united Italy, which he believed was dominated by politicians and far from the ideals that had led the Risorgimento struggles, and beginning to feel the weight of the age, Felice Le Monnier gave the company ownership to a company (Società Successori Le Monnier), formed by notable Florentines and Tuscans and presided over by Bettino Ricasoli, which impressed the publishing house with a culturally less defined editorial policy.

Felice Le Monnier, who remained in the company as director until 1879, fled to Florence and died on June 27, 1884. He is buried in the Sacred Doors Cemetery in Florence.

== Letters and Scraps ==
- Giuseppe Giusti, IX Lettere inedite di Giuseppe Giusti a Felice Le Monnier (New Unpublished Letters by Giuseppe Giusti at Felice Le Monnier), Tipografia di G. Carnesecchi e figli, 1889;
- Nino Cortese, Giannina Milli and her poetry edition in the National Library of Felice Le Monnier (Unpublished Letters), in Abruzzo Magazine of Letters and Linguistics, 1914, p. 505 and sgg;
- I primordi della "Biblioteca Nazionale" di Felice Le Monnier in LX lettere a lui (The Beginnings of Felice Le Monnier's 'National Library' in 60 Letters to Him), Pietro Giordani, 1916.

== Notes ==
- Maria Iolanda Palazzolo, Geography and Dynamics of Publishing Settlements, in History of Publishing in Contemporary Italy by Gabriele Turi, Florence, Giunti, 1997, pp. 42–43

== Literature ==
- Cadioli, Alberto; Vigini, Giuliano (2018). Storia dell'editoria in Italia dall'Unità a oggi. Milano: Editrice Bibliografica. p. 20. ISBN 9788893570053.
- Ceccuti, Cosimo (1974). Un editore del Risorgimento, Felice Le Monnier. p. 20.
- Palazzolo, Maria Iolanda (1997). Storia dell'editoria nell'Italia contemporanea. Giunti. p. 40-52. ISBN 9788809212367.
