= Ippolito de' Medici =

Italian Catholic cardinal (1511–1535)

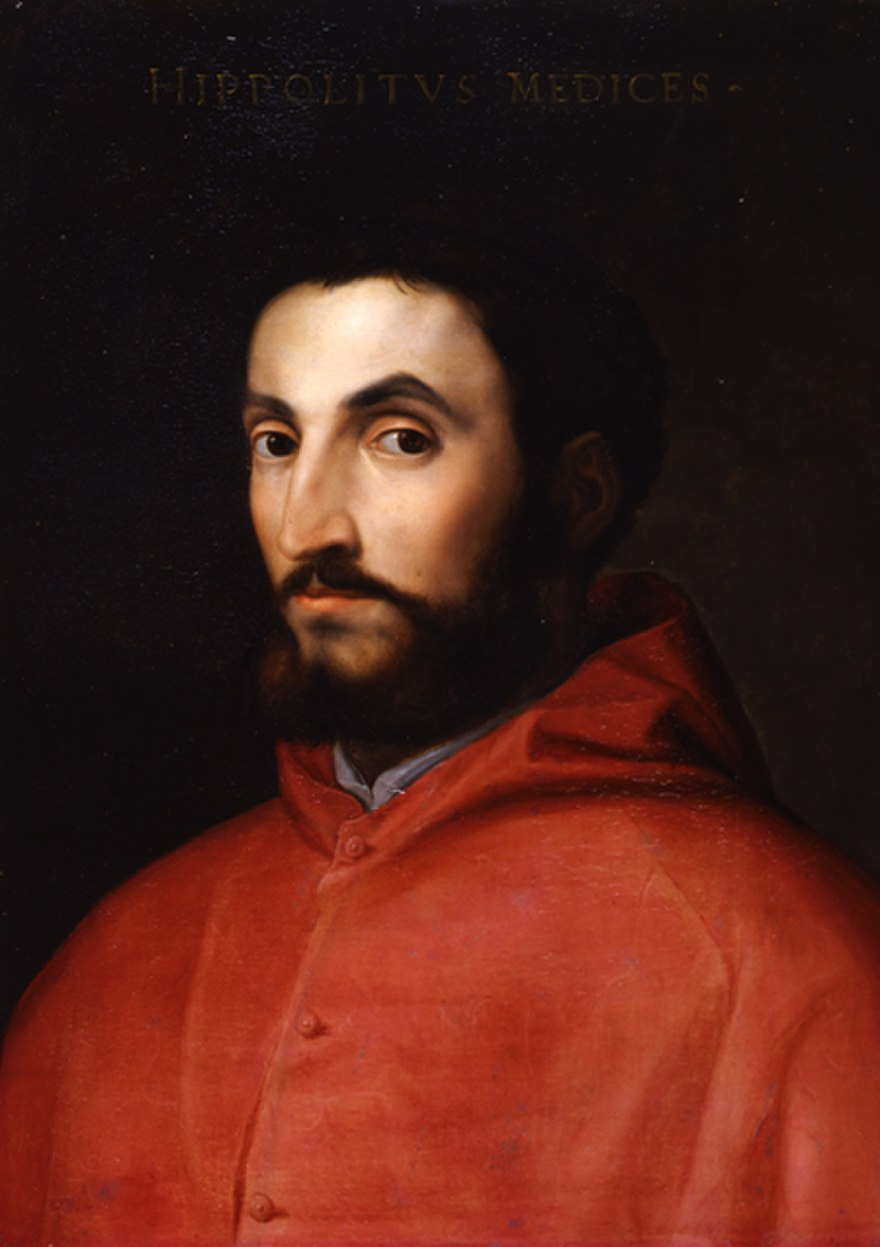
- Portrait by Cristofano dell'Altissimo, c. 1605

Lord of Florence
- Reign: 19 November 1523 – 16 May 1527
- Predecessor: Giulio de' Medici
- Successor: Alessandro de' Medici
- Born: March 1511; Florence, Republic of Florence
- Died: 10 August 1535 (aged 24); Itri, Kingdom of Naples
- Noble family: Medici
- Father: Giuliano de' Medici
- Mother: Pacifica Brandano

Ippolito de' Medici (March 1511 – 10 August 1535) was the only son of Giuliano di Lorenzo de' Medici, born out of wedlock to his mistress Pacifica Brandano.

== Biography ==
Ippolito was born in Urbino. His father died when he was only five (1516), and he was subsequently raised by his uncle Pope Leo X and his cousin Giulio de' Medici.

When Giulio was elected pope as Clement VII in 1523, Ippolito ruled Florence on his behalf (1524–1527). After the siege of Florence (1529–1530), however, Clement favored his nephew Alessandro de' Medici as the family member to take charge of Florence. To assist and succeed him in church affairs, Clement VII created his cousin Ippolito a cardinal on 10 January 1529, and on the same day named him first Archbishop of Avignon, a position that brought him a considerable income. Since he was only eighteen, he could not be consecrated a bishop or even be the administrator of the diocese without a papal dispensation. Ippolito was named Cardinal Priest of Santa Prassede, though there is no evidence that he was ever ordained a priest or consecrated as a bishop. His own preference was to be ruler of Florence, not a cleric, and he spent the rest of his life trying to renounce his clerical calling and depose his cousin Alessandro. On 3 May 1529, Cardinal Ippolito was named Papal Legate in Perugia.

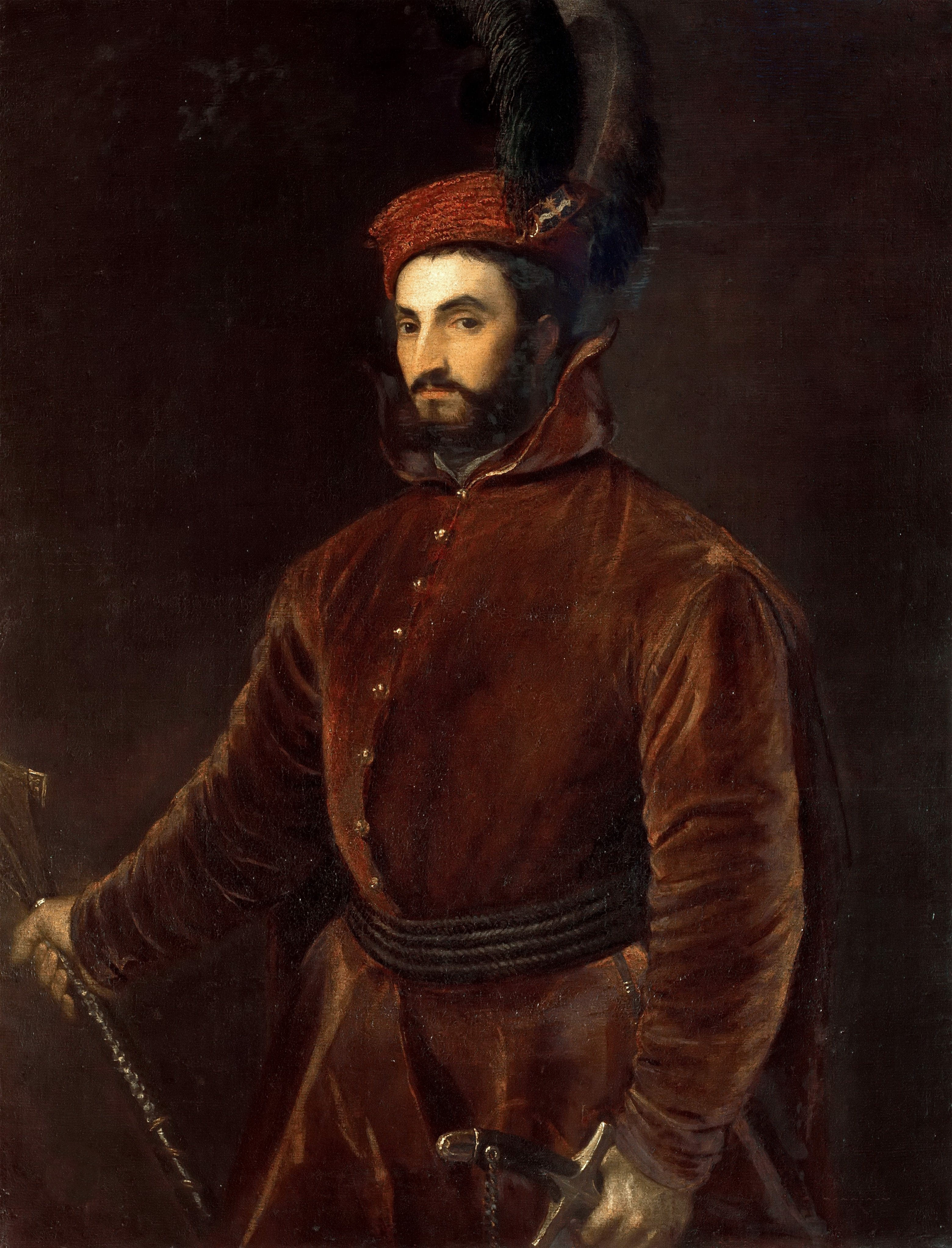
Portrait of Ippolito de Medici in a Hungarian Costume by Titian (1532–33)

On 12 August 1529, Cardinal Ippolito de' Medici was one of the three Cardinal Legates who met Holy Roman Emperor Charles V at Genoa with the purpose of conducting him in state to his coronation as Emperor in Bologna. In Bologna, he participated in the ceremonies of the coronation.

On 15 February 1530, Pope Clement granted Cardinal Ippolito a ⅓ share in the annual papal income from the town and territory of Chiusi for his lifetime.

Ippolito was sent to Hungary in the spring of 1532 as Papal Legate, departing from Rome on 8 July, according to the diaries of the Italian literatus Pietro Aretino. He was in Regensburg by 12 August. There he demonstrated a talent for soldiering, leading 8000 Hungarian soldiers against the Ottoman Turks, though the Sultan Suleiman the Magnificent was unwilling to move forward so late in the season, and the Emperor Charles V only had sufficient forces for defense, not offence. When the Emperor returned to Italy early in the next year, Cardinal Ippolito followed him.

On 3 July 1532, Cardinal Ippolito was named Vice-Chancellor of the Holy Roman Church, the most lucrative office in the Roman Curia. Along with that post he was transferred to the Titular church of San Lorenzo in Damaso.

He was a friend to, and possibly had a liaison with, Giulia Gonzaga, the Countess of Fondi. He loved Catherine de' Medici, but they never married. Alessandro de' Medici once caught him and Catherine de' Medici in a private embrace. However, when he was sent away as a Cardinal, they weren't allowed to see each other any longer. Some theories suggest that the reason Clement made Ippolito Cardinal was to keep him and Catherine de' Medici apart. By 24 April 1531, Catherine had been promised to Henry, the son of King Francis I of France, in a draft contract of marriage. Catherine was 12, and Cardinal Ippolito was 20.

Ippolito's cousin, Pope Clement, died on 25 September 1534. The Conclave elected Cardinal Alessandro Farnese on 12 October and he chose the name Paul III. In 1535, free of his cousin's influence, Cardinal Ippolito acted as Florentine ambassador to Emperor Charles V, happily conveying complaints against the administration of Alessandro de' Medici. Suffering from a low-grade fever for eight days, Ippolito died from malaria in Itri, in southern Lazio, although there were rumors that he had been poisoned either by Alessandro de' Medici, whose abuses he was intending to denounce, or by Pope Paul III, who aimed to acquire Ippolito's lucrative benefices for his own nephews.

During the Renaissance, the Medici developed a large menagerie with human zoo in Rome. In the 16th century, Cardinal Ippolito de' Medici had a collection of people of different races as well as exotic animals. He is reported as having a troupe of so-called Savages, speaking over twenty languages; there were also Moors, Tartars, Indians, Turks and Africans.

== Bibliography ==
- Baronio, Cesare (1878). Augustin Theiner (ed.). Annales ecclesiastici, denuo excusi et ad nostra usque tempora perducti ab Augustino Theiner... (in Latin). Vol. Tomus 32 (1527–1541). Barri-Ducis: Bertrand. pp. 233–237.
- Cardella, Lorenzo (1793). Memorie storiche de cardinali della Santa romana chiesa (in Italian). Vol. Tomo Quarto (IV). Roma: Pagliarini. pp. 107–112.
- Crews, Daniel A. (2003). "Spanish Diplomacy and the Mysterious Death of Cardinal Ippolito de' Medici". Mediterranean Studies. 12: 103–110. JSTOR 41166953.
- Giordani, Gaetano (1842). Della venuta e dimora in Bologna del S. P. Clemente VII per la coronazione di Carlo V, imperator ... 1530 (in Italian). Bologna: Fonderia e Tipografia Governativa - Alla Volpe.
- Knecht, R. J. (16 July 2014). Catherine De'Medici. New York: Routledge. p. 12. ISBN 978-1-317-89687-6.
- Moretti, Giuseppe (1940). "Il Cardinale Ippolito dei Medici dal trattato di Barcellona alla morte (1529-1535)". Archivio Storico Italiano (in Italian). 1: 137–178.
- Pastor, Ludwig (1910). The History of the Popes : from the close of the Middle Ages, Volume X. London: Kegan Paul Trench Trübner.
- Rebecchini, Guido (2010). Un altro Lorenzo: Ippolito de' Medici tra Firenze e Roma (1511-1535) (in Italian). Venezia: Marsilio. ISBN 978-88-317-0646-9.
- Weaver, Elissa Barbara (1982). "Ippolito de' Medici, Humanist". Renaissance Quarterly. 35 (4): 674–677.
