= Christian Hebraist =

Scholar of Hebrew who comes from a Christian background

A Christian Hebraist is a scholar of Hebrew texts who approaches the works from a Christian perspective. The main area of study is the Hebrew text of the Bible (known as the Old Testament to Christians and as the Tanakh to Jews), but Christians have occasionally taken an interest in the Talmud and Kabbalah.

The discipline has long been a site of Jewish–Christian intellectual interaction. The early church fathers got their knowledge of Hebrew traditions (Masoretic, Midrashim and Aggadah) from Jewish teachers. That is seen especially in the exegesis of Justin Martyr, Aphraates, Ephraem Syrus and Origen of Alexandria. Jerome's teachers are even mentioned by name such as Bar Ḥanina (Hananiah). In the Middle Ages, Christian converts from Judaism provided a key source of Hebrew education, as native Christians rarely learned the language. As the Renaissance and Enlightenment proceeded, the discipline increasingly came to investigate extrabiblical texts, and eventually became a branch of philology.

== Antiquity ==
The notion of Hebraica veritas (Hebrew truth)—that the Hebrew Bible was the original Old Testament and as such was superior to the Greek translations, the Septuagint—is generally traced back to Jerome. This was "a radical shift ... in the history of Christian thought", since before his time the Septuagint was generally treated as authoritative without any need for looking to the Hebrew text. This was bolstered by the legend of the Septuagint's miraculous origin, which turned it into a divinely inspired translation. Jerome expressed doubt about the legend and, rather than accepting the common view that the Hebrew textual tradition had been corrupted by the Jews, expressed the view that the Greek translations were not wholly accurate. When Jerome produced a new Latin translation from the original languages, he chose as his source text for the Old Testament the proto-Masoretic text.

== Middle Ages ==
In Western Christianity knowledge of Hebrew was historically scarce outside of converts from Judaism. The Venerable Bede (d.735) discusses Hebrew terms, but appears to rely entirely on Jerome for this. The same may be said of Alcuin (b.735), who revised the Biblical translation of Jerome. The ninth-century Pseudo-Jerome, who worked in the circle of Rabanus Maurus (d.856), knew Hebrew.

During the Twelfth-Century Renaissance, contact between Christian and Jewish scholars increased. Peter Abelard (d.1142) recommended that Christian scholars take up the language of the Old Testament and many followed this recommendation. The School of Saint Victor became the centre of Hebraism in western Europe. The school of Toledo also worked with Hebrew, but it was secondary to Arabic. Adam of Saint Victor (d.1146) was the most prominent Victorine Hebraist and his student, Herbert of Bosham (fl.1162–89), studied with Abraham ibn Ezra (d.c.1167) to acquire deeper grammatical understanding. The Cistercian tradition of Hebrew studies began with Nicholas Manjacoria.

Among prominent English Hebraists were Alexander Neckham (d.1217); Stephen Langton (d.1228), who composed a Hebrew–Latin dictionary of Biblical terms; William de la Mare (fl.1272–79), who was patronised by Robert Grosseteste (d.1253); and Roger Bacon (d.c.1292), who wrote a Hebrew grammar.

In the fourteenth century, the Franciscans and Dominicans were involved in setting up chairs of Hebrew in universities across Europe. The ecumenical Council of Vienne (1312) ordered chairs established at the universities of Rome, Oxford, Paris, Salamanca and Bologna. Paris had the leading Hebraist of the period in Nicholas of Lyra (d.1349), while following him was Bishop Paul of Burgos (d.1435), a Jewish convert.

== Renaissance ==
At the end of the 15th century the Renaissance and the Reformation, while awakening a new interest in the classics, brought about a return to the original text of Scripture and an attempt to understand the later literature of the Jews. Hieronymus Buslidius, the friend of Erasmus, gave more than 20,000 francs to establish a Hebrew chair at Louvain; as the chair of Hebrew at the University of Paris, Francis offered the chair to Elijah Levita, the friend of Cardinal Ægidius of Viterbo, who declined to accept it. Cardinal Grimani and other dignitaries, both of the state and of the Church, studied Hebrew and the Kabbalah with Jewish teachers; even the warrior Guido Rangoni attempted the Hebrew language with the aid of Jacob Mantino (1526). Pico de la Mirandola (d. 1494) was the first to collect Hebrew manuscripts, and Reuchlin was the first to write a dictionary and short grammar of the Hebrew language (1506). A more detailed grammar was published by Otto Walper in 1590.

During the 16th century there was an emphasis on Hebrew grammar and Jewish exegesis. One of the most noted Hebraists of this period was Immanuel Tremellius (1510–1580), who was born Jewish and converted first to Catholicism and soon thereafter became a Calvinist, producing the main Reformed translation of the Hebrew Bible into Latin (he also translated the New Testament from the Syriac into Latin). Sebastian Münster (d. 1552) was known as a grammarian; Pellicanus (d. 1556) and Pagninius (d. 1541), as lexicographers; Daniel Bomberg (d. 1549), as a printer of Hebrew books. Arius Montanus (d. 1598) edited the Masorah and the Travels of Benjamin of Tudela. Widmanstadt (1523), living in a colony of Spanish Jewish refugees in Naples, studied Hebrew with David ibn Ya'ya and Baruch of Benevento, and collected the Hebrew manuscripts which formed the basis of the Hebrew division of the Royal Library at Munich. Vatablé (d. 1547) made use of Rashi's commentary. Conrad Gesner (d. 1565) was the first Christian to compile a catalogue of Hebrew books; Jacob Christmann (d. 1613) busied himself with the Jewish calendar, and Drusius (d. 1616) with the ethical writings of the Jews.

== 17th century ==
Johannes Buxtorf (d. 1629) studied the Targum and the Talmud, and also endeavored to understand Jewish history. Women also showed interest in Hebraism: Anna Maria van Schurman, in the Dutch Republic; Dorothy Dury in England; Christina, Queen of Sweden (d. 1689); Maria Dorothea, consort of the Duke of Saxe-Weimar; Elizabeth, daughter of Frederick V of the Palatinate; Maria Eleanora, wife of Charles I Louis of the Palatinate; Antonia, daughter of Duke Eberhard of Württemberg.

Through Buxtorf a serious attempt was made to understand the post-Biblical literature, and many of the most important works were translated into Latin. In this connection the following names may be mentioned: Johannes Cocceius (d. 1667); Constantin L'Empereur (d. 1648); John Lightfoot (d. 1675); Johann Leusden (d. 1699); and especially Surenhuis (1698), who gave a complete translation of the Mishnah; Jewish theology was studied by Carpzov (d. 1699), Wagenseil (1705; whose letters show how he gathered information), and Johann Stephan Rittangel (1641); antiquities, by Samuel Bochart (d. 1667), Hottinger (d. 1667), Hyde (d. 1700), Trigland (d. 1705), Breithaupt (1707), and Johann Jakob Schudt (d. 1722). Hackspan (d. 1659) wrote upon the value to the theologian of studying the works of the Rabbis. Their writings on the Bible were read by Schickard (1635), Humphrey Hody (d. 1706), and Richard Simon (d. 1712), while catalogues of Hebrew collections were published by Plantavitius (d. 1651), Le Long (d. 1721), and Montfaucon (d. 1741). Hottinger gave this literature a place in his Bibliotheca Orientalis; Otho (1672) wrote a biographical lexicon of the Mishnah teachers; and Bartolocci's Bibliotheca Rabbinica (1675) continued these bibliographical labors.

== 18th century ==
Jacques Basnage knew no Hebrew, but his L'Histoire de la Religion des Juifs was the first attempt at a complete presentation of the history of Judaism. The Entdecktes Judenthum of Eisenmenger (d.1704) compiled a collection of Jewish learning. Johann Christoph Wolf (d. 1739), with the help of the Oppenheimer library, was able to produce his Bibliotheca Hebræa, which laid the foundation for all later works in Hebrew bibliography.

Johann Christian Georg Bodenschatz (d. 1797), though not a scholarly Hebraist, gave an accurate account of Jewish ceremonials. Bashuysen (d. 1750) was a translator and printer of Hebrew books. Reland (d. 1718), was the first to use Talmudic material for the study of the geography of Palestine. The bibliographers Unger (d. 1719) and Gagnier (d. 1720) gave Wolf his information regarding the manuscripts in the Bodleian. J. H. Michaelis (d. 1738) and Mai (d. 1732) compiled a catalogue of the Uffenbach library. Baratier (d. 1740), the youthful prodigy wrote on Benjamin of Tudela. Mill (d. 1756) treated rabbinical exegesis. Wähner (1762) described Hebrew antiquities.

In colonial America, most studies on Christian Hebraism continued at institutions like Harvard College through imported textbooks from Europe. During the 1730s, Harvard would try and produce their own Hebrew textbook with the assistance of Hebrew professor Judah Monis (d. 1764). Monis hoped that translating Christian texts into Hebrew would not only encourage Hebraism among students, but also allow Hebrew to be a bridge for the Christian conversion of colonial Jews. At Yale, Ezra Stiles, the president of Yale College (1778) similarly pursued Hebraism, learning from itinerant Jewish rabbi Haim Carigal (d. 1777) after he had preached a Pentecost sermon to Newport Jews.

However, scholars like Shalom Goldman have stressed that colonial Puritans' studies of Hebrew should be treated as a separate language from both how diasporic Jews used the language and how Christian Hebraism was practiced in Europe. When printers and ministers used Hebrew in small amounts, it functioned less as an object of study and more as an image or index of biblical expertise, which actually revealed little about an original meaning of the verse in question.

== Early 19th century ==
Towards the end of the 18th century the focus of Semitic scholars shifted to Biblical criticism and the study of other Semitic languages.

Interest in the text of the Bible caused some work to be done in the collecting of Hebrew manuscripts, especially by Benjamin Kennicott in England (1776–80) and Giovanni Bernardo De Rossi in Italy (1784–88).

== Late 19th century ==
The Institutum Judaicum in Leipzig, founded by Franz Delitzsch, and a similar society bearing the same name in Berlin and founded by Hermann Strack, attempted to diffuse in the Christian world a knowledge of Jewish writings. Gustav Dalman published philological works on Talmudic grammar and lexicography.

== List of Christian Hebraists ==
The following list of Christian Hebraists includes material taken from the Jewish Encyclopedia (1906), compiled upon the basis of Steinschneider's article mentioned in the bibliography below. Christian students of the Bible more generally were not included, as they may be found in other articles.

=== A ===
- Aarhus, Peter Sim. (c. 1711; Hafen ?)
- Abicht, Jo. Ge. (d. 1740; Wittenberg)
- Adler, Jac. Ge Chr. (d. 1805; Copenhagen)
- Ægidius de Viterbo (1471–1532; Italy)
- Alberta Katherina (17th century; Bohemia)
- Alfonso de Leon Zamora (16th century)
- Allixius, Petrus (17th century; Alençon)
- Alting, Jacob (17th century; Groningen, Dutch Republic)
- Amoena Amalia (wife of Duke Louis; d. 1625, Anhalt)
- Amoena, Louise (princess; 17th century; Anhalt)
- Anna Sophia, Abbess (c. 1658; Quedlinburg)
- Anna (Weissbrucker) Urban (16th century)
- Anchersen, Matthias (d. 1741; Jutland)
- Anslus, Gerebrard (17th century)
- Antonia, Duchess (d. 1679; Württemberg)
- Arias Montanus (Benedictine; d. 1598; Seville)
- Armengaud Blaise (d. 1312; Montpellier)
- Arnd, Joshua (c. 1626; Güstrow)
- Arnoldus, Michael (c. 1680; Dutch Republic)
- Asp, Matthias (1696–1763; Upsala)
- Assemani, Simon (1752 - 1821; Padua)
- Aubry, Esaias (c. 1730; Berlin ?)

=== B ===
- Bacon, Roger (1214–94; Oxford)
- Baldi, Bernardino (1553–1617; Urbino)
- Baratier, Johann Philipp/Jean-Phillipe (1721–40; Schwabach)
- Abbé Jean-Joseph-Léandre Bargès (1810 – December 31, 1896), French orientalist.
- Barozzi, Francesco (d. 1587; Italy)
- Bartolocci, Giulio (1613–87; Rome)
- Bashuysen, Heinrich Jacob (1679–1750; Hanau)
- Baynus, Rudolphus (c. 1554; Paris)
- Beckmann, Jo. Christ. (c. 1677; Frankfurt-an-der-Oder)
- Becks, Matth. Frid. (1649–1701; Augsburg)
- Bedwell, William (1561–1632; London)
- Beelen, Ian Theodor (c. 1841; Amsterdam)
- Beke, Matth. (c. 1708; Amsterdam)
- Bellermann, Johann Joachim (1754–1842; Erfurt)
- Bengel (?), Eric (c. 1692; Sweden)
- Bernard, Edward (1638–96; Oxford)
- Billerbeck, Paul (1853 - 1932, Germany)
- Bircherode, Jan. (1623–86; Copenhagen)
- Biscioni, Anton Maria (1674–1756; Florence)
- Bleibtreu, Philipp Johann (c. 1699; Frankfort-on-the-Main)
- Blesilla (5th century)
- Bodecker, Stephan (Bishop; c. 1438; Brandenburg)
- Bohlius, Sam. (1611, Greifenberg (Pomerania) – 1639, Rostock)
- Borel, Adam, Jun. (1603–67; Zealand)
- Böschenstain, Johannes, (1472–1540)
- Bourdelot (c. 1638; Paris)
- Breithaupt, Johann Friedrich (1639–1713; Gotha)
- Brighenti, Gio. Ant. (d. 1702; Verona)
- Broughton, Hugh (1549–1612; Tottenham)
- Sir Thomas Browne (1605–82)
- Buddaeus, Jo. Fr. (Johann Franz Buddeus) (1667–1729; Halle?)
- Burgonovo, Archangelus (Minorite; 16th century; Pozzo)
- Buxtorf, Johannes I. (1564–1629; Basel)
- Buxtorf, Johannes II. (1599–1664; Basel)
- Buxtorf, Johannes Jakob (1645–1705; Basel)
- Buxtorf, Johannes Jakob (1663–1732; Basel)

=== C ===
- Cademannus, Jos. Rud. (Johann Rudolf Cademann) (1680–1720; Pegau)
- Calonges, Madame de
- Campen, Joh. van (John van Campen) (1490–1538; Freiburg-im-Breisgau)
- Caninius, Angelus (1521–57; Paris)
- Cappellan, Claud. (d. 1667; Paris)
- Carpzov, Johann (Benedictine; 1639–99; Leipzig)
- Cartwright, Christopher (1602–58; York)
- Castell, Edmund (1606–85; Higham Gobion)
- Castro, Joh. Rodriguez de (1739–96; Madrid)
- Cellarius (?), Jo. (c. 1518)
- Chenery, Thomas (1826–84; London)
- Chevalier, Antoine Rodolphe (1523–1572); France)
- Chiarini, Luigi (Abbé; 1789–1832; Warsaw)
- Christmann, Jac. (1554–1613; Heidelberg)
- Chrysococca, Georgius (1340-56? Greece)
- Chytraeus, D. (c. 1551)
- Cibo—? (wife of Joh. Verano, Duke of Camerino; 1550)
- Ciselius, Phil. (c. 1696; Franeker)
- Clanner (J. G. ?) (c. 1726 ?)
- Samuel Clark (c. 1657; Oxford)
- Clavering, Robert (Bishop; 1671–1747; Peterborough)
- Clodius, Jo. Chr. (d. 1633; Leipzig)
- Cluverus, Jo. (17th century)
- Cnollen, Adam Andreas (1674–1714; Füth)
- Cnollen, Jos. Nicol. (brother of preceding)
- Coccejus (Koch), Jo. (1603–69; Leyden)
- Coddaeus, Giul. (Wilhelmus van der Codde) (1575–1630; Leyden)
- Collin, C. E. (c. 1705; Giessen)
- Collins, G. (c. 1890; Oxford)
- Cornaro, Piscopia Cornelia (Eleonora Lucretia; (1646–1684); Venice)
- Costus, Petrus (c. 1554)
- Cotta, Johann Friedrich (1701–79; Tübingen)
- Cramer, Anna Maria (1613–27; Magdeburg)
- Cramer, Johann Jakob (1673–1702; Zürich)
- Cramer, Johann Rudolf (1678–1731; Zürich)
- Crenius, Thom. (1648–1728; Leyden)
- Crocius, Lud. Mich. (c. 1673)
- Croius (?), Jo. (18th century; Oxford)

=== D ===
- Dachs, Fried. Bernh. (c. 1726; Utrecht)
- Dalmaki, Laurentius (c. 1643; Hunga)
- Danz, Jo. Andr. (1654–1728; Jena)
- Dassovius, Theod. (d. 1721; Wittenberg; Kiel)
- Delitzsch, Franz (1813–1890; Leipzig
- Diogo Correa Coelho (c. 1990; [Born Brazilian]{Australia})
- Disma, P. (c. 1757; Italy)
- Dithmar, Just. Christ. (c. 1706; Dutch Republic?)
- Donatus, Franc. (d. 1635; Rome)
- Dorothea Maria (wife of Duke John; 17th century; Saxe-Weimar)
- Dove, John (c. 1746; London)
- Johannes van den Driesche, "Drusius" (1550–1616; Leyden)
- Drusius, Jo. II. (son of preceding; 1588–1609; Chichester)
- John Duncan (1796 Aberdeen – 26 February 1870)

=== E ===
- Adam Easton (Benedictine; d. 1397; Hereford)
- Ebertus, Jac. (1549–1614; Frankfort-on-the-Oder)
- Ebertus, Theod. (d. 1630; Frankfort-on-the-Oder)
- Alfred Edersheim (1825–1889)
- Eggers, Jo. (c. 1719; Basel; Leyden)
- Einem, Jo. Justus von (c. 1738; Germany)
- Einsiedel, Marg. Sybilla (wife of Conrad Löser; c. 1670; Saxony)
- Eisenmenger, Joh. And. (1654–1704; Heidelberg)
- Elisabeth (Abbess of Herfort; d. 1680)
- Empereur, Constantin l' (1570–1648; Leyden)
- Etheridge, J. W. (c. 1856; Penzance)
- Eustochium Julia (5th century; Rome)

=== F ===
- Fabricius, Ern. Christ. (c. 1792)
- Fabricius, Fred. (1642–1703; Wittenberg)
- Fabricius, Johann Albert (1668–1736)
- Fagius Paul(us) (1504–49; Cambridge)
- Faust, Jo. Friedr. (c. 1706; Germany)
- Ferrand, Lud. (c. 1640–1700; Paris)
- Figueiro, Petrusa (c. 1615)
- Fourmont, Étienne, the elder (1683–1745; Paris)
- Franciscus, Maria (Capuchin)
- Franck, Sebastian (c. 1537; Ulm)
- Francke, August Hermann (1663–1727)
- Frey, Jo. Ludw. (1682–1759; Basel)
- Friesen, Henr. Kath. (17th century; Saxony)
- Frommann, Erh. Andr. (1722–74; Monastery of Berge, Magdeburg)
- Fronmüller, Conrad (c. 1679; Altdorf?)
- Fuller, Nicol. (1557–1626; Salisbury)

=== G ===
- Gaffarellus, Jacobus/Jacques Gaffarel (1601–81)
- Gagnier, Joseph (1670–1740; Oxford)
- Galatinus, Petrus/Galatino, Pietro Colonna (c. 1518)
- Galle, Joh. (c. 1711; Upsala)
- Gaudia, Barthol. Valverdio (Spain)
- Gaulmyn, Gilb. (d. 1667; France)
- Gejerus, Martin (1614–80; Freiberg)
- Genebrard, Gilbert (1537–97; Samur)
- Georgius Gentius (1618–87; Freiberg)
- Gesenius, Wilhelm (1786–1842; Halle an der Saale)
- Germberg, Herm. (1604)
- Giggeius, Ant. (d. 1632; Milan)
- Gill, John (1697–1771; London)
- Graser, Conrad (d. 1613; Germany)
- Greenup, Albert (1866–1952; England)
- Groddeck, Gaḅr. (1672–1709; Danzig)
- Guidacerius (Guidacier), Agathius (c. 1540)
- Guisius, Gulielmus (1653–90; Oxford)
- Guyenne, De (c. 1625; Paris)

=== H ===
- Susanna Habert (d. 1633; France)
- Hackspan, Theodor (1607–59; Altdorf)
- Haller, Albert (1708–77; Bern)
- Hanel, Melchior (c. 1661; Prague)
- Hannecken, Meno (1595–1677; Marburg
- Hardt, Anton Julius Von Der (1707–85; Helmstädt)
- Hardt, Herm. van der (1660–1746; Helmstädt)
- Hartmann, Anton Theodors (1774–1838; Rostock)
- Hartmann, Jo. Phil. (c. 1708)
- Hartmann, Martin (1851, Breslau – 1918, Berlin)
- Havemann, Chris. (17th century)
- Hebenstreit, Johann Christian (1686–1756; Leipsic)
- Helenius, Engelbart (c. 1727; Sweden)
- Helvig, Christoph (1581–1617; Giessen)
- Hepburn, James Bonaventure (1573–1621; Scotland)
- Herford, R. Travers (1860–1950) British
- Hilpert, Jo. (c. 1651)
- Hinckelmann, Alr. (1652–95; Hamburg)
- Hirt, Jo. Frid. (1719–84; Wittenberg)
- Hochsteter, Andreas Adam (1668–1717; Tübingen)
- Holten, Albert (c. 1675; Tübingen)
- Hommel, Carl Ferdinand (1722–81; Leipzig)
- Honorius (Monk; 1452)
- Hottinger, Johann Heinrich I. (1620–67; Heidelberg)
- Hottinger, Jo. Henr. II. (c. 1704)
- Houting, Henr. (c. 1695)
- Hufnagel, G. F. (c. 1795)
- Huldrich, Jo. Jac. (1683–1731)
- Hulsius, Anton (d. 1685; Holland)
- Husen, Franc. (c. 1676)
- Hyde, Thomas (1631–1703; Oxford)

=== I ===
- Ikenius, Conrad (1689–1753; Bremen)
- Imbonatus, Carlus Josephus/Carlo Giuseppe Imbonati (d. 1696; Rome)

=== J ===
- Jacobs, Henry (1608–52; Oxford)
- Janvier, Renatus Ambros. (1613–82; Paris)
- Johannes Lucæ (1406; Italy)
- Franciscus Junius (the elder)
- Justinianus, Augustin (1470–1531; "Episcopus Nebiensis")

=== K ===
- Keller, Gottl. Wilh. (17th century; Jena [?])
- Kennedy, Archibald Robert Stirling (1859–1938)
- Kinghorn, Joseph (1766–1832; Norwich)
- Kircher, Athanasius (Jesuit; 1602–80; Rome)
- Knorr, Christian, Baron de Rosenroth (1636–89; Sulzbach)
- Koccher, Herrm. Fried. (c. 1783; Jena)
- König, Friedrich Eduard (1846; Reichenbach)
- König, Sam. (1670–1750; Bern)
- Köppen, Nic. (c. 1709; Greifswald)
- Kosegarten, Johann Gottfried Ludwig (1792–1860; Greifswald)
- Krafft, Karl (c. 1839; Ansbach)
- Kraut, Paul (c. 1703; Lund)
- Kyber, David (16th century; Strasburg?)

=== L ===
- Lagarde, Paul de (1827–91; Göttingen)
- Lakemacher, Johann Gottfried (1695, Osterwieck - 1736, Helmstädt)
- Lange, Jo. Joachim (1670–1744; Halle)
- Lange, W. (c. 1710)
- Langens, Henr. (c. 1720; Dutch Republic)
- Lederlin, Johann Heinrich (1672–1737; Strasburg)
- Lehmann, Ge. Heinrich (1619–99; Leipsic)
- Lehmann, Maria Barbara (c. 1700; Schnekengrün)
- Leib, Chilian (Prior; 1471–1548; Rebdorf)
- Le Long, Jac. (1665–1721; Paris)
- Lenz, Jo. Leonh. (c. 1700; Germany)
- Lepusculus, Sebastian (c. 1516; Germany)
- Leusden, Johann (1624–99; Utrecht)
- Leydecker, Melchior (1642–1722; Utrecht, put on Index Librorum Prohibitorum by the Catholic Church)
- Lightfoot, John (1602–75; Ely)
- Lipomanni, Marco (c. 1440; Venice)
- Losa, Isabella (d. 1564; Cordova)
- Loscan, Joh. Frid. (c. 1710; Germany)
- Losius, Johann Justus, (1685-approximately 1737; Germany)
- Lowe, W. H. (William Henry), (1848–1917; Cambridge)
- Ludolf, Susanna Magdalena (c. 1700; Frankfort-on-the-Main)
- Ludwig, Christ. L. (b. 1663, Landshut; d. 1732)
- Lund, Dan. (b. 1666, Fogdoë; d. 1746, Strengnäs)

=== M ===
- McCaul, Alexander (b. 1799, Dublin; d. 1863, London)
- Mai, Joh. Hen. (1688–1732; Giessen)
- Malamina, Cæsar (c. 1774; Florence)
- Manfred (?), King (d. 1266; Germany)
- Mannetti, Giannozzo (b. 1396, Florence; d. 1459, Naples)
- Maria Eleonore (wife of Ludwig Philipp of Pfalz; c. 1669)
- Maria Elizabeth (daughter of Duke Christian Albrecht; c. 1706; Schleswig-Holstein)
- Marchina, Martha (d. 1646; Naples)
- Margoliouth, David Samuel (1858–1940) Oxford)
- Margoliouth, G. (living; London)
- Margoliouth, Moses (b. 1820, Suwałki; d. 1881, London)
- Marini, Marco (b. 1541, Brescia; d. 1594, Brescia)
- Mathews, H. J (1844 - 1905, England)
- Matthias Aquarius (c. 1581)
- Matthias, Elias (Germany)
- Meelführer, Rud. Martin (b. 1670, Ansbach; d. 1729)
- Mercer, Jo. (d. 1570; Uzès)
- Meyer, Jo. (c. 1693; Dutch Republic)
- Michaelis, Johann David (1717–1791)
- Michaelis, Johann Heinrich (1668–1738)
- Midhorp, Joh. (c. 1562)
- Mieg, Jo. Frid. (b. 1700, Marburg; d. 1788, Heidelberg)
- Mill, David (b. 1692, Königsberg; d. 1756, Utrecht)
- Millard, Alan
- Molinaea, Maria (17th century)
- Molitor, Christoph. (c. 1659; Altdorf)
- Molza-Porrino, Tarquinia (d. 1600; Modena)
- Bernard de Montfaucon (b. 1655, Soulange; d. 1741, Paris)
- Moré, Eugène (c. 1837; France)
- More, Henry (b. 1614, Grantham; d. 1687, Cambridge)
- Morin, Etienne (b. 1625, Caen; d. 1700, Amsterdam)
- Morin, Jean (b. 1591, Blois; d. 1659, Paris)
- Muhl, Henr. (b. 1666, Bremen; d. c. 1730, Kiel)
- Muhl, Jos. (Holstein)
- Muis, Simon de (b. 1587, Orléans; d. 1644, Paris)
- Münster, Sebastian (Minorite; b. 1489, Ingelheim; d. 1552, Basel)
- Murner, Thomas (Minorite; b. 1475; d. 1537?)
- Alexander Murray (b. 1775 Dunkitterick, Galloway; d. 1813 Edinburgh)
- Myerlin, David Fr. (d. 1778; Frankfort-on-the-Main)

=== N ===
- Nagel, Jo. Andr. Mich. (1740–1788; Altdorf)
- Neale, Thomas (1569-1569; Regius Professor of Hebrew: Oxford, England)
- Nicholas Of Lyra (Nicolaus Lyranus) (c. 1270–1349; Paris)
- Nigri (Schwartz), Peter (c. 1475; Cadana?)
- Fr. Nork (1803–50; Germany [actually Fr. Korn])
- Norrelius, Andr. (c. 1720; Upsala)
- Novenianus, Phil. (?) (c. 1520; Hasfurtensis?)

=== O ===
- Odhelius, Laur. (d. 1691; Upsala)
- Opfergeld, Friedrich (1668–1746; Breslau)
- Opitius, Paul Friedr. (1684–1745; Kiel)
- Osterbröck, Aaggaens.
- Otho, Jo. Henr. (d. 1719; Lausanne)
- Ouserl, Phil. (c. 1714; Frankfort-on-the Main)
- Owmann, Mart. Jac. (c. 1705; Germany)

=== P ===
- Pagninus, Xanthus/?Santes Pagnini (b. 1470, Lucca; d. 1536, Lyon)
- Palmroot, Jo. (c. 1696; Upsala)
- Pasinus, Jos. (b. 1687, Padua; d. 1770, Turin)
- Pastritius, Jo
- Paula, Cornelia (d. 408; Rome)
- Dom Pedro II (Emperor of Brazil; 1825–91)
- Pellikan, Konrad (1478–1556; Zürich)
- Peringer, Gustav (b. 1657; Upsala; Stockholm)
- Peritz, Ismar J. (living; Syracuse, US)
- Perreau, Pietro (Abbé; living, Parma)
- Pertsch, W. H. F. (c. 1720; Jena)
- Peter of St. Omer (1296; Paris)
- Petit, Pietro Giov, de (d. 1740; Rome)
- Petrus de Alexandrica (Augustinian; 1342)
- Petrus Montagnana (?) (1478; Italy)
- Pfeiffer, August (b. 27 October 1640, Lauenburg an der Elbe; d. 11 January 1698, Lübeck)
- Pico de la Mirandola (d. 1494; Italy)
- Picques, L. (c. 1670; Paris)
- Pistorius, Jo. Nidanus (b. 1544, Nidda; d. 1607, Freiburg im Breisgau)
- Plantavitius, Johannes/Jean VI. Plantavit de la Pause (Bishop; 1625–48; Lodève)
- Plato of Tivoli (Plato Tiburtinus, 1116; Barcelona)
- Pontacus, Arnold (Bishop; d. 1605; Bazas)
- Postel, Guillaume. (b. 1505. Delorie; d. 1581, Paris)
- Prache, Hilaric (b. 1614, Teutschel; d. 1679, London)
- Prideaux, Humphrey (Dean; b. 1648, Padstow; d. 1724, Norwich)

=== Q ===
- Quinquaboreus (Cinqarbre), Johannes (d. 1587; Paris)

=== R ===
- Rabe, Joh. Jac. (1710–98; Ansbach)
- Rapheleng, Franc. (b. 1539; Lannoy)
- Raymund Martin/Ramón Martí (Monk; c. 1286)
- Raymund de Peñaforte (Dominican; 1175–1275; Barcelona)
- Reineccius, Chr. (b. 1668, Großmühlingen; d. 1752, Weißenfels)
- Reiske, Johann Jakob (b. 1716, Zörbig; d. 1774, Leipzig)
- Reland, Adrian (b. 1676, Ryp; d. 1718, Utrecht)
- Rendtorf, Jo. (Hamburg)
- Reuchlin, Johann (b. 1455, Pforzheim; d. 1522, Stuttgart)
- Rezzonius, Franc. (b. 1731, Como; d. 1780)
- Rhegius, Urbanus (c. 1535; Celle)
- Rhenferdius, Jac. (b. 1654, Mühlheim; d. 1712, Franeker)
- Ritmeier, Chr. Henr. (c. 1697)
- Rivinius, Tileman Andreas (b. 1601, Halle; d. 1656, Leipzig)
- Robustellus, Jo. (1655; Rome)
- Rohan, Anna, Princess of (c. 1634)
- Rönnow, Magn. (d. 1690)
- Rossi, Giovanni Bernardo de (1742–1831; Parma)

=== S ===
- Sebutia, Cæcilia (c. 1683; Rome)
- Sigæa, Aloysa (wife of Alfonso du Guevas; d. 1569; Toledo)
- Sacy, Isaac Silvestre de (1758–1838; Paris)
- Salchli (?), Jo. Jac. (b. 1694, Eggwil; d. 1774, Bern)
- Saracena, Ludovica (wife of Marcus Offredus; c. 1606; France)
- Sartorius, Jo. (b. 1656, Eperies; d. 1729, Danzig)
- Saubert, Jo. (1638–88; Helmstädt)
- Scheidt, Balth. (1614–70; Strasburg)
- Scherping, Jacob (c. 1737; Stockholm)
- Scherzer, Jo. Adam (b. 1628, Eger; d. 1683, Leipzig)
- Schickard, Wilhelm (b. 1592, Herrenberg; d. 1635, Tübingen)
- Schindler, Valentin (d. 1604; Wittenberg; Helmstädt)
- Schmidt, Sebastian (c. 1656; Strasburg)
- Schnelle, Sebald (1621–51; Nuremberg)
- Schoettgen, Jo. Christ. (1687–1751)
- Scholl, J. C. F. (Tübingen)
- Schotanus, Christ. (b. 1603, Scheng; d. 1671, Franeker)
- Schramm, Jonas Conr. (c. 1700; Helmstädt)
- Schreckenfuchs, Erasmus Oswald (1511–75; Tübingen)
- Schroeder, Jo. Joachim (1680–1756; Marburg)
- Schulten, Albert (1686–1750; Dutch Republic)
- Schulten, Car. (c. 1725; Lund)
- Schulten, Heinrich Albert (1749–93; Dutch Republic)
- Schulten, Jo. Jac. (1716–78; Dutch Republic)
- Schurman, Anna Maria van (1607–78; Altona)
- Schwenter, Daniel (1585–1636; Nuremberg)
- Scotus, Jo. Duns (d. 1308, Scotland)
- Sebastianus, Aug. Nouzanus (c. 1532; Marburg)
- Seidel, Casp. (c. 1638; Hamburg)
- Seiferheld, J. L. (18th century)
- Seyfried, Christ. (c. 1664)
- Seyfried, Henr. (c. 1663; Altdorf)
- Sgambatus, Scipio (c. 1703; Italy)
- Sheringham, Robert (b. 1602, Guestwick; d. 1678, Cambridge)
- Siegfried, Carl (b. 1830, Magdeburg; d. Jena)
- Smith, Thomas (b. 1638, London; d. 1710)
- Sommer, Gottfr. Chris. (c. 1734; Gotha)
- Sonneschmid, Jo. Just. (c. 1719; Jena?)
- Spalding, G. L. (b. 1762, Barth; d. 1811, Friedrichsfelde)
- Sprecher, Jo. Died. (c. 1703; Helmstädt)
- Springer, Daniel (1656–1708; Breslau)
- Staemmen, Christoph. van (c. 1661; Preza-Holsatus?)
- Starke, Heinrich Benedict (b. 1672, Engelen; d. 1717, Leipsic)
- Steinmetz, Joh. Andr. (b. 1689, Gr. Knicymtzd; d. 1762)
- Strack, Herrmann L. (living; Berlin)
- Stridzberg, Nic. H. (c. 1731; Lund)
- Struvius, Jo. Jul. (c. 1697; Germany)
- Stucki, Johann Wilhelm (b. 1542, Zurich; d. 1607, Zurich)
- Surenhuys, Willem (d. 1729; Amsterdam)
- Svetonio, Agost. (Italy)

=== T ===
- Tanfeld, Elisabeth (d. 1639; London)
- Charles Taylor (Hebraist)
- Francis Taylor (1589-1656)
- Johannes Terentius, or Terrentius, (Jean Schreck), Swiss Jesuit (b. 1580, Constance; d. 1630, China)
- Theobald (?) (Subprior; 14th century; Paris)
- Immanuel Tremellius (1510 – 9 October 1580)
- Trigland, Jacobus (d. 1705; Leyden)
- Tychsen, Oluf Gerhard (1734–1815; Rostock)

=== U ===
- Ulmann, Jo. (c. 1663; Strasburg)
- Uranius, Heinrich (1492 - 1572, Germany)
- Urbanus Henricus Rhegius (Urbanus Rhegius) (c. 1535; Celle)
- Ury, Jo. (1724–1796, Hungarian; d. Oxford)
- Cnaeus Cornelius Uythage (c. 1680; Leyden)

=== V ===
- Bartolomè Valverde y Gandìa Bartholomaeus Valverdius (Spain)
- Varen, Aug. (d. 1684; Rostock)
- Vatablé/Watebled, François (d. 1547; Paris)
- Vehe, Matthias (d.1590)
- Vinding, Jo. Paul (c. 1633; Dutch Republic ?)
- Voorst, Dick Cornelis van (b. 1751, Delft; d. 1833, Amsterdam)
- Voss, Dionysius (b. 1612, Dordrecht; d. 1633, Amsterdam)
- Voysin (Vicinus), Jos. de (c. 1635; Paris)

=== W ===
- Wagenseil, Helena Sybilla (c. 1700; Altendorf)
- Wagenseil, Johann Christoph (1635–1703; Altdorf)
- Wakefield, Robert (d. 1537; Oxford)
- Wallin, Georg (c. 1722; Holm)
- Walper, Otto (Latin: Otho Gualtperius) (1543–1624; Marburg)
- Walter, Jo. (c. 1710)
- Walther, Christ. (c. 1705; Königsberg)
- Warner, Levin (d. 1663; Dutch Republic)
- Weiganmeier, Georg (1555–99; Tübingen)
- John Wemyss (c. 1579–1636)
- Wessel, Joh. (John Wessel Goesport) (b. 1419, Groningen; d. 1489)
- Widmannstetter, Johann Albrecht (b. 1500; d. 1559, Wellingen)
- Wilkins, David (b. 1685; d. 1748, Hadleigh)
- Winckler, Jo. Fried. (b. 1679, Wertheim; d. 1738, Germany)
- Winer, Jo. Ge. Bened. (1789–1858; Leipsic)
- Witter, Henr. Bernh. (c. 1703; Germany)
- Witzel, Georg, (1501 - 1573, Germany)
- Woeldicke, Marcus (1699–1750; Copenhagen)
- Wolf (?), Georg (c. 1557; Grimma)
- Wolf, Jo. Christoph. (1688–1739; Hamburg)
- Wolf, Jo. W. (d. 1571; Gera)
- Wolph (?), Jo. Hac. (Zürich)
- Wotton, William (1666–1720; London)
- Johann Wülfer (1651–1724; Nuremberg)
- Wünsche, August (living; Dresden)

=== Z ===
- Zanolini, Antonio (1693–1762; Padua)
- Andreas Christoph Zeller (c. 1711; Maulbronn)
- Gustav Georg Zeltner (1672–1738; Altdorf)

== See also ==
- Hebraism
- Muslim Hebraists

== Bibliography ==
The bibliography of that article is below:

- Moritz Steinschneider, Christliche Hebraisten, in Zeit. für Hebr. Bibl. i. 50 et seq.;
- Gesenius, Gesch. der Hebr. Sprache, passim, Leipsic, 1815;
- Zunz, Z. G. pp. 1 et seq. (re-published in G. S. i. 41 et seq.);
- L. Geiger, Studium der Hebraisch Sprache in Deutschland, Breslau, 1870;
- J. Perles, Beiträge zur Geschichte der Hebraisch und Aramaisch Studien, pp. 154 et seq.;
- Meyer Kayserling, Les Hébraisants Chrétiens, in R. E. J. xx. 264 et seq.;
- Kaufmann, Die Vertretung der Jüden Wissenschaft an den Universitäten, in Monatsschrift, xxxix. 145 et seq.;
- S. A. Hirsch, Early English Hebraists, in J. Q. R. xii. 34 et seq.;
- Kauffmann, Jacob Mantino, in R. E. J. xxvii. 30 et seq. (comp. J. Q. R. ix. 500);
- E. Sachau, Orientalische Philologie, in Die Deutschen Universitäten, p. 520, Berlin, 1893;
- William Rosenau, Semitic Studies in American Colleges, Chicago, 1896;
- Moritz Steinschneider, Hebr. Bibl. xx. 65 et seq.;
- Kayserling, A Princess as Hebraist, in J. Q. R. ix. 509.G.
