= Zeltner =

Zeltner is a surname. Notable people with the surname include:

- Bruno Zeltner (born 1967), Swiss sailor
- Gustav Georg Zeltner (1672–1738), German theologian
- Jürg Zeltner (1967–2020), Swiss businessman
- Michelle Zeltner (born 1991), Swiss heptathlete
- Paul E. Zeltner (1925–2018), American politician
- Peter Josef Zeltner (1765–1830), Swiss officer, politician and diplomat
- Thomas Zeltner (born 1947), Swiss physician, lawyer and politician
- Tina Zeltner (born 1992), Austrian judoka
- Trevor Zeltner (born 1951), Australian rules footballer
