= Johann Christoph Wolf =

German Christian Hebraist, polyhistor and collector of books

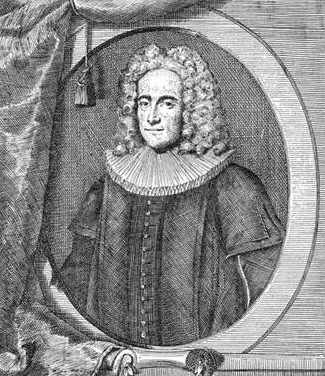
Johann Christoph Wolf

Johann Christoph Wolf (February 21, 1683, at Wernigerode – July 25, 1739, at Hamburg) was a German Christian Hebraist, polymath, and collector of books.

He studied at Wittenberg, and traveled in Holland and England in the interest of science, coming in contact with Campeius Vitringa, Willem Surenhuis, Adriaan Reland, Jacques Basnage, and others. He especially occupied himself with the study of Oriental languages and literature, of which he became professor at the Hamburg gymnasium in 1712.

At this time the Oppenheimer Collection was housed at Hamburg, and Wolf determined to devote himself to a description of Jewish literature based upon this collection. His researches resulted in Bibliotheca Hebræa (4 vols., Hamburg, 1715–33), the first volume of which contains a list of Jewish authors, while the second deals with the subject matter under the headings "Bible," "Talmud," "Cabala," etc. The knowledge of Christendom about the Talmud was for nearly a century and a half derived from Wolf's statements. Vol. iii. is a supplement to vol. i.; vol. iv. to vol. ii.

Wolf's work forms the basis of Steinschneider's catalogue of the Bodleian Library, which has references to it on nearly every page. In addition to this work, he issued a history of Hebrew lexicons (for his doctoral dissertation; Wittenberg, 1705), and Notitia Karæorum (Hamburg, 1721).

Wolf owned a large library of 25,000 volumes, books and oriental manuscripts. Among other things, he acquired the collection of the Frankfurt councillor Zacharias Conrad von Uffenbach.

== Selected works ==
- Curae philologicae et criticae in Novum Testamentum Basilee 1741.
