= Giovanni Bernardo De Rossi =

Italian Hebraist

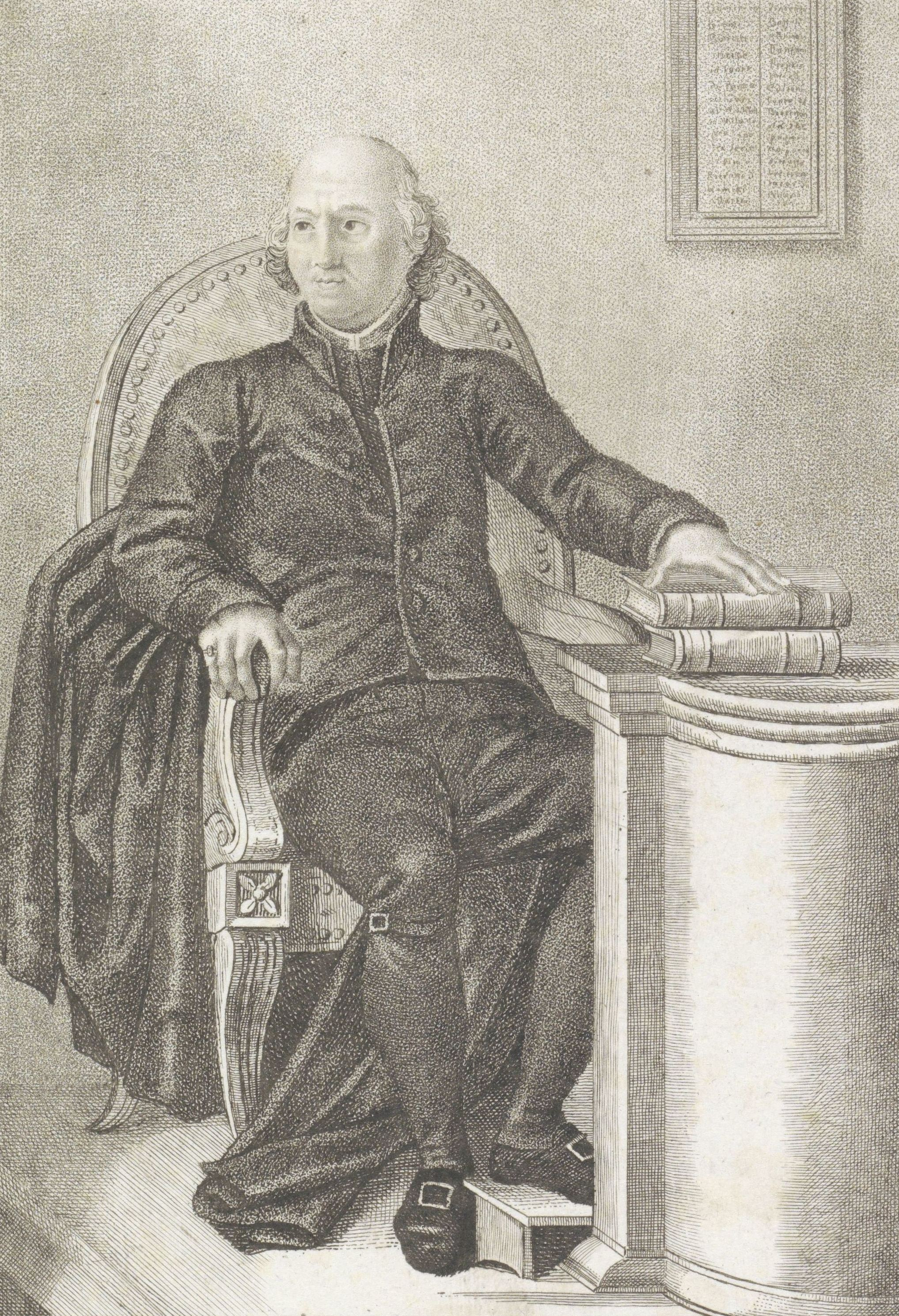
Giovanni Bernardo De Rossi

Giovanni Bernardo De Rossi (October 25, 1742 in Castelnuovo Nigra, Piedmont – March 23, 1831 in Parma) was an Italian Christian Hebraist. He studied in Ivrea and Turin. In October 1769, he was appointed professor of Oriental languages at the University of Parma, where he spent the rest of his life. His inaugural lecture on the causes of the neglect of Hebrew study was published in 1769 at Turin.

== Scholarly writings ==
De Rossi devoted himself to three chief lines of investigation—typographical, bibliographical, and text-critical. Influenced by the example of Benjamin Kennicott, he determined on the collection of the variant readings of the Old Testament, and for that purpose collected a large number of manuscripts and old editions. In order to determine their bibliographical position he undertook a critical study of the annals of Hebrew typography, beginning with a special preliminary disquisition in 1776, and dealing with the presses of Ferrara (Parma, 1780), Sabbionetta (Erlangen, 1783), and, later, Cremona (Parma, 1808), as preparatory to his two great works, Annales Hebræo-Typographici (Parma, 1795, sec. xv.) and Annales Hebræo-Typographici ab 1501 ad 1540 (Parma, 1799). This formed the foundation of his serious study of the early history of Hebrew printing; see Incunabula.

In connection with this work he drew up a Dizionario Storico degli Autori Ebrei e delle loro Opere (Parma, 1802; German translation by Hamberger, Leipzig, 1839), in which he summed up in alphabetical order the bibliographical notices contained in Wolf, and, among other things, fixed the year of Rashi's birth; he also published a catalogue of his own manuscripts (1803) and books (1812). All these studies were in a measure preparatory and subsidiary to his Variæ Lectiones Veteris Testamenti (Parma, 1784–88. Supplement 'Scholia Critica', 1798), still the most complete collection of variants of the Hebrew text of the Old Testament. In order to compile it he visited all the chief libraries of Italy, and through its compilation he obtained the knighthood of St. George at the court of Parma and seductive offers from Pavia, Madrid, and Rome. As examples of the use of his work, he issued a specimen of the Targum on Esther (Rome, 1782; 2d ed., revised, Tübingen, 1783).

He was also interested in the polemics of Judaism and Christianity, and wrote on this subject his Della Vana Aspettazione degli Ebrei del loro Re Messia (Parma, 1773), which he defended in a pamphlet two years later; he further published a list of anti-Christian writers, Bibliotheca Judaica Antichristiana (Parma, 1800). A select Hebrew lexicon, in which he utilized Parḥon's work (Parma, 1805), and an introduction to Hebrew (ib. 1815) conclude the list of those of his works which are of special Jewish interest. Rossi died in Parma in 1831.

== Works ==
- De praecipuis caussis, et momentis neglectae a nonnullis Hebraicarum litterarum disciplinae disquisitio elenchtica, Augustae Taurinorum : ex Tipographia Regia, 1769 (on-line)
- Della vana aspettazione degli ebrei del loro re Messia dal compimento di tutte le epoche trattato del teol. Giambern. De-Rossi, Parma : dalla Stamperia reale, 1773; Roma : Marini e Co., 1840 (on-line)
- Epithalamia exoticis linguis reddita, Parmae : ex regio typographeo, 1775
- De hebraicae typographiae originae ac primitiis, seu antiquis ac rarissimis hebraicorum librorum editionibus saeculi 15. disquisitio historico-critica, Parmae : ex Regio typographeo, 1776 (on-line)
- Specimen variarum lectionum sacri textus et chaldaica estheris additamenta cum Latina versione ac notis ex singulari codice privatae bibliothecae Pii VI P. O. M. edidit variisque dissertationibus illustravit Iohannes Bernardus De Rossi, Accedit eiusdem auctoris appendix de celeberr. codice tritaplo samaritano bibliothecae Barberinae, Romae : sumptibus Venantii Monaldini Bibliopolae, 1782 (on-line)
- Io. Bernhard De Rossi, Annales typographiae ebraicae Sabionetenses appendice aucti. Ex Italicis Latinos fecit m. Io. Frid. Roos, collega, Erlangae : sumtibus Io. Iac. Palm., 1783 (on-line)
- Variae lectiones Veteris Testamenti ex immensa mss. editorumq. codicum congerie haustae et ad Samar. textum, ad vetustiss. versiones, ad accuratiores sacrae criticae fontes ac leges examinatae opera ac studio Johannis Bern. De-Rossi. Prolegomena, clavis codicum, Genesis, Exodus, Leviticus, Parmae : ex regio typographeo, 1784 (on-line)
- Annales Hebraeo-typographici sec. 15. descripsit fusoque commentario illustravit Joh. Bernardus De-Rossi, Parmae : ex Regio Typographeo, 1795 (on-line)
- Joh. Bernardi De-Rossi Scholia critica in V. T. libros seu Supplementa ad varias sacri textus lectiones, Parmae : ex regio typographeo, 1798 (on-line)
- Annales hebraeo-typographici ab an. MDI ad MDXL digessit notisque hist.-criticis instruxit Joh. Bernardus De-Rossi, Parmae : ex Regio tipographeo, 1799 (on-line)
- Dizionario storico degli autori ebrei e delle loro opere, Parma : dalla Stamperia Imperiale, 1802 (Volume I, on-line) e (Volume II, on-line)
- Dizionario storico degli autori arabi più celebri e delle principali loro opere, Parma : dalla Stamperia Imperiale, 1808 (on-line)
- Mss. codices Hebraici biblioth. I. B. De-Rossi ling. Orient. prof. accurate ab eodem descripti et illustrati. Accedit appendix qua continentur mss. codices reliqui al. linguarum, Parma : dalla Stamperia Imperiale, 1803 (Volume I, on-line) (Volume II, on-line) (Volume III, on-line)
- Annali ebreo-tipografici di Cremona distesi dal dottore G. Bernardo De Rossi prof. di lingue orientali, Parma : dalla Stamperia Imperiale, 1808 (on-line)
- Il libro di Giobbe tradotto dal testo originale dal dottore G. Bernardo De-Rossi, Parma : dalla Stamperia reale, 1812 (on-line)
- Introduzione allo studio della lingua ebrea, dell'importanza di questo studio, e della maniera di ben instituirlo, del cavaliere G. Bernardo De-Rossi preside della facoltà di teologia e professore di lingue orientali, Parma : dalla stamperia Blanchon, 1815 (on-line)
- Introduzione alla Sacra Scrittura che comprende le prenozioni più importanti relative ai testi originali e alle loro versioni del professore G. Bernardo De-Rossi preside della facoltà teologica, Parma : dalla stamperia ducale, 1817 (on-line)
- Sinopsi della ermeneutica sacra o dell'arte di ben interpretare la Sacra Scrittura del professore G. Bernardo De-Rossi preside della facoltà teologica e riformatore nel magistrato supremo dell'università, Parma : dalla stamperia ducale, 1819 (on-line)
