= Otto Walper =

German theologian and philosopher

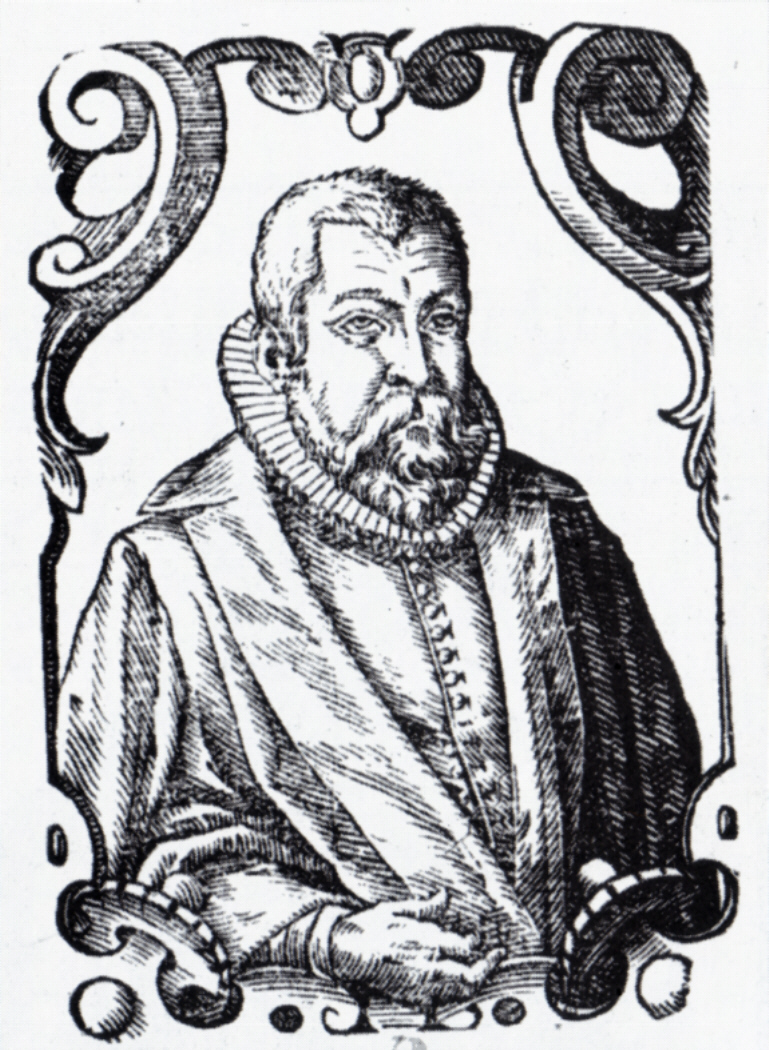
WP Otto Walper

Otto Walper (also Latin Otho Gual(t)perius; 1 January 1543 – 28 December 1624) was a German theologian and philosopher.

Otto Walper was born in Rotenburg an der Fulda, and studied at the University of Marburg, where he later became the main professor of Greek (from 1582) and Hebrew (from 1585), having received a Ph.D. degree at the University of Basel in 1582. Being a Lutheran, Walper left Marburg in 1593 after the ruling Prince of Hesse-Kassel (to which Marburg belonged) converted to Calvinism and professors at the territory's university were expected to follow suit. Walper went to Lübeck, where he became principal of the Catharineum Latin school.

Walper's Greek grammar was reprinted several times and remained in popular use as a school grammar until the 18th century. He was also one of the first Christian authors to write a Hebrew grammar.

He had a son and a daughter by his wife Zeitlose Orth. He died in Lübeck, aged 81.

== Works ==
- De Dialectis Graecae linguae praecipuis, Attica, Ionica, Dorica, Aeolica, et coronidis vice nonnulla de proprietate poetica, Spieß, Frankfurt am Main 1589
- Grammatica linguae sanctae, per quaestiones & responsiones duobus libris comprehensa: quorum prior etymologiae: posterior syntaxeos doctrinam continet, Selfisch, Wittenberg 1590
- Grammatica Graeca: Ex optimis quibusque autoribus, in usum Academiae Marpurgensis, ceterarumque Scholarum Hussiacarum, per quaestiones & Responsiones concinnata, Egenolff, Marburg 1590
- Dissertatio de incarnatione filii Dei, Johann Balhorn the Younger, Lübeck 1595
- Synkrisis sive comparatio logica, utriusque familiae logicae, Romeae scilicet et Aristotelicae, Reusner, Rostock 1599 (Vergleich römischer und aristotelischer Logik)
- Sylloge Vocum Exoticarum, H. E. Hebræarum, Syro-chaldaicarum, Persicarum, Latinarum, & Latinis respondentium, Quae habetur in contextu Græco Testamenti Novi : Cum Interpretatione Etymologica, & rerum utilium adhaerentium commonefactione, Auctore Othone Gualtperio, Selfisch/Henckel, Wittenberg 1608
