= Johann Christian Schöttgen =

German biblical scholar

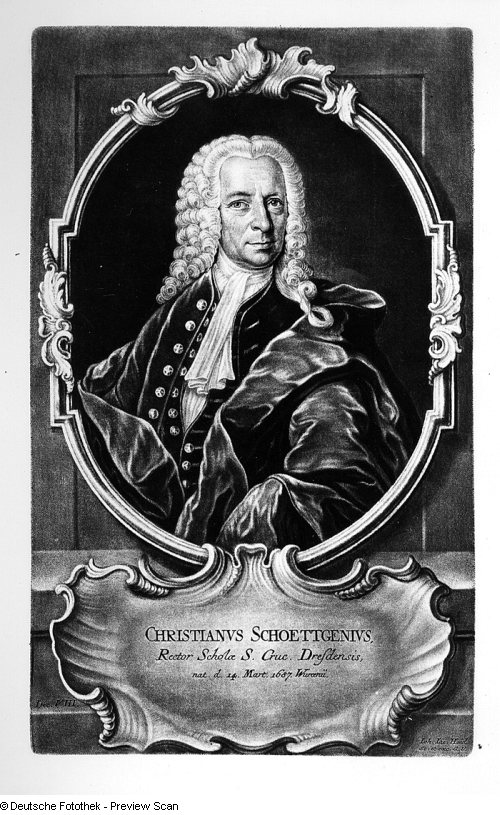
Johann Christian Schöttgen

Johann Christian Schöttgen (Wurzen, 14 March 1687- Dresden, 16 December 1751) was a German biblical scholar. He is mainly known for his Horae Ebraicae et Talmudicae in universum Novum Testamentum (1733) which follows on the model of John Lightfoot's use of Talmudic insights for commentary on the New Testament. Much of Schoettgen's work was expanded by Paul Billerbeck for Strack's Kommentar (1926).

Among English readers influenced by Schöttgen's argument for Messianism in early Judaism outside the Bible was Gladstone.
