= Heinrich Jacob Bashuysen =

Heinrich Jacob Bashuysen (October 26, 1679 – c. 1750) was a German Christian printer of Hebrew books and Orientalist.

Bashuysen was born at Hanau, Prussia. He founded a printing-establishment in his native city between 1709 and 1712; and over 100 publications were issued from his press. He was a zealous promoter of Hebrew and rabbinical literature; and, among other works, he translated extracts from the rabbinical commentaries to the Psalms (Hanau, 1712). In one of his dissertations he translated a part of the Mishneh Torah of Moses Maimonides (Hanover, 1705; Frankfort, 1708); and it was his intention to translate the whole work, as well as the Hebrew grammar Shoresh Yehudah, by Juda Neumark, director of Bashuysen's printing-office in Hanau. Bashuysen published Abravanel's commentaries on the Pentateuch, and intended to edit the entire work in four volumes. He also entertained the idea of amplifying Otho's Historia Doctorum Mishnicorum by adding the Amoraim.

Among Bashuysen's other works may be mentioned:

- "Panegyricus Hebr. de Ling. Hebr." (Hanover, 1706; also in German, ib. 1706)
- "Institutiones Gemarico-Rabbin." (Hanover, 1718)
- "Exercit. Paradoxa de Nova Methodo Discendi per Rabbinos Ling. Hebr." (Servestæ, 1720).

In 1701 he was appointed ordinary professor of Oriental languages and ecclesiastical history at the Protestant gymnasium of Hanau, and in 1703 became professor of theology in that institution (Bashuysen's father was preacher in the Dutch Reformed Church of the city). In 1716 he accepted the position of rector and "professor primarius" at the gymnasium of Zerbst. Bashuysen was a member of the Academy of Berlin and of the London Society for the Propagation of the Gospel.
