= David ben Solomon ibn Yahya =

Portuguese rabbi

David ben Solomon ibn Yaḥya (1455–1528) was a rabbi in Lisbon, in 1476.

== Life ==
Accused of inducing the Marranos to relapse into Judaism, he was sentenced by King João II to be burned at the stake. He fled to Naples with his family, but was captured; and he was compelled to sell his library in order to secure sufficient money to purchase his liberty.

On his release he fled to Corfu and stayed with Don Isaac Abravanel, and later went to Larta, where he died in extreme poverty.

== Works ==
He was the author of a Hebrew grammar entitled Leshon Limmudim, which was published in Constantinople (1506, 1528) and in Venice (1542). While at Larta he wrote to the wealthy Jew Isaiah Messene, asking his aid; and this letter was copied by Joseph David Sinzheim, and later published by Grätz ("Gesch." viii. 482–483).

According to Carmoly, David was the author of the following works also:

- "Ḳab we-Naḳi" (Lisbon, n.d.), a commentary on the Mishnah
- a selection of the best explanations by various commentators on the Bible (2d ed., Venice, 1518; 4th ed., Salonica, 1522)
- "Sheḳel ha-Ḳodesh" (Constantinople, 1520), on the rules for Hebrew poetry
- "Tehillah le-Dawid," an uncompleted commentary on the Psalms
- "Hilkot Ṭerefot" (ib. 1520); and a commentary on Maimonides's "Moreh," appended to his above-mentioned letter of supplication to Messene.
