= Jürg Zeltner =

Swiss businessman (1967–2020)

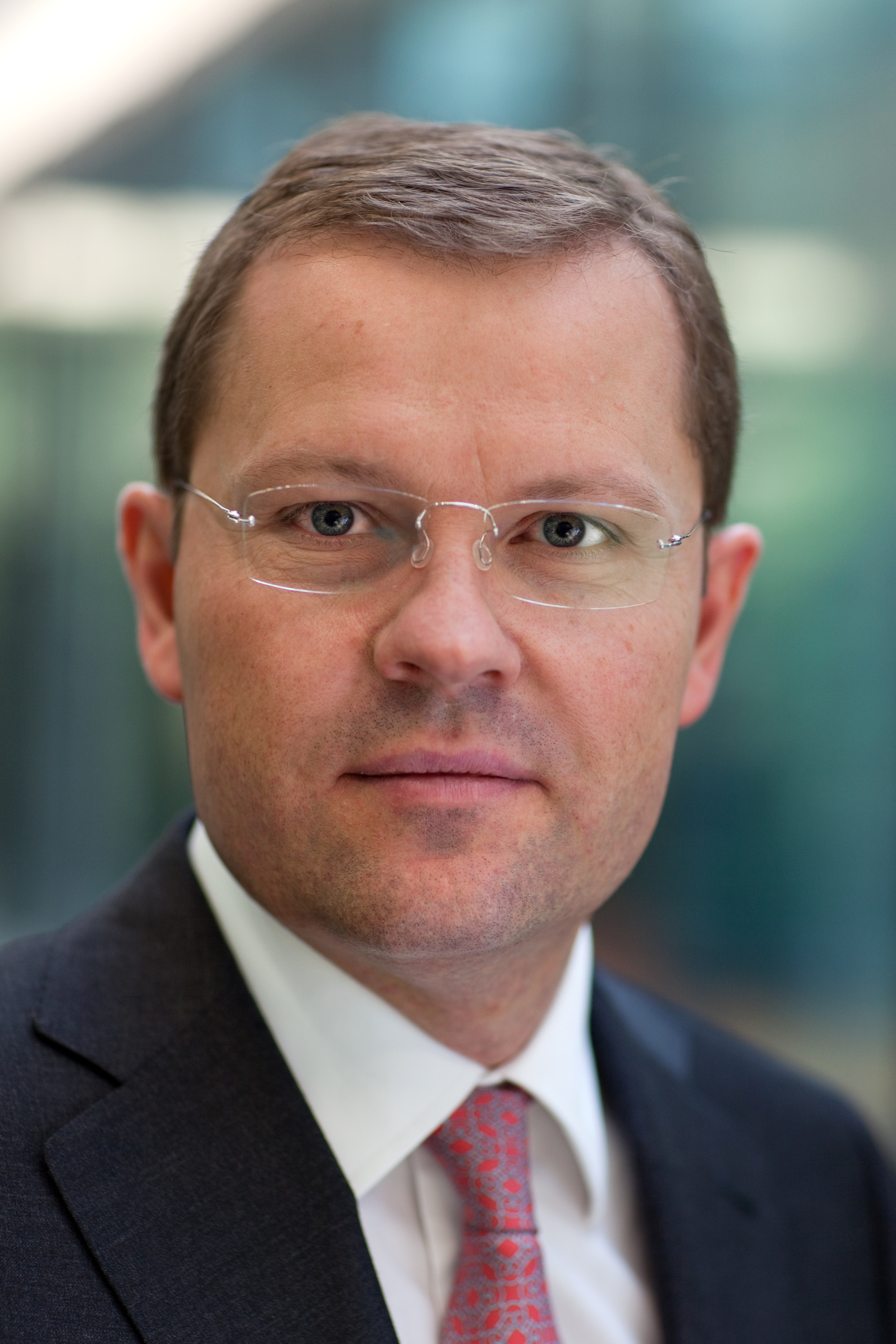

Personal details
- Born: 4 May 1967
- Died: 22 March 2020 (aged 52)
- Occupation: Group CEO & member of the Board of Directors at KBL European Private Bankers

Jürg Zeltner (4 May 1967 – 22 March 2020) was a Swiss corporate executive. He last served as Group CEO and member of the Board of Directors at KBL European Private Bankers. He was earlier the President of UBS Wealth Management from November 2014 to December 2017. He stepped down from the Group Executive Board at the end of 2017, and retired from the firm as of 2018. He had served as a member of the UBS Group Executive Board since February 2009. From February 2009 to January 2012 he was co-CEO of Wealth Management and Swiss Bank. In February 2016, Zeltner ranked first among the best global private banking CEOs, according to a 2016 Euromoney private banking survey.

In 2019, he was diagnosed with a severe brain tumor. He died on 22 March 2020. His son Thomas Zeltner founded Zeltner & Co GmbH in 2021 on the basis of Jürg Zeltner's legacy.

== Education ==
Growing up, Zeltner wanted to study veterinary medicine, but ended up doing an internship at Swiss Bank Corporation which later merged with Union Bank of Switzerland to form his current employer UBS. Zeltner holds a diploma in Business Administration from the College of Higher Vocational Education in Bern and attended the six-week Advanced Management Program at Harvard Business School.

== Career ==
=== Career progression ===
Zeltner joined the Corporate Client division of the Swiss Bank Corporation (SBC) in 1987. Between 1987 and 1998, Zeltner occupied numerous roles at Swiss Bank Corporation (SBC) within the Private and Corporate Client division in Bern, New York City, and Zurich: Amongst other roles, Zeltner was Credit Risk Officer for Corporate and Institutional clients.

Following the merger of SBC with the Union Bank of Switzerland (SBG/UBS) to become UBS in 1998, Zeltner was appointed as head of Portfolio Management for Risk Transformation and Capital Management.

From 2005 to 2007 he occupied the position of CEO at UBS Deutschland, Frankfurt. In November 2007, he was appointed as Head of Wealth Management North, East & Central Europe. From February 2009 to January 2012 he was co-CEO of Wealth Management and Swiss Bank.

He was the President of UBS Wealth Management from November 2014 to December 2017 with more than 2 Trillion Assets under Management globally.

On 4 December 2017, UBS announced Zeltner would step down from GEB at the end of the year. He retired from the firm in 2018. The Board of Directors then appointed Martin Blessing, a former President of Human Resources and Corporate Banking, and President of UBS Switzerland, to succeed him as President of Wealth Management.

In 2019, Zeltner was appointed Group CEO and member of the Board of Directors at KBL European Private Bankers. He made a significant co-investment in the pan-European private banking group.

Zeltner was nominated for the Supervisory Board of Deutsche Bank on 15 August 2019, but resigned from his position at the end of 2019. On 24 January 2020, Deutsche Bank nominated Sigmar Gabriel as Zeltner's successor.

=== Business strategy ===
On 17 November 2011, UBS held their annual Investor Day in New York. Zeltner gave a presentation on the UBS Wealth Management Division, in which he outlined how the business was positioned in the financial markets and in view of future growth. He pointed out that UBS's strategy is centered around its wealth management business.

In February 2015, Zeltner was awarded second place among the ten best global private banking CEOs of 2015. He revealed the strategies behind the Wealth Management division. According to him, there was a shift from asset gathering and product manufacturing to clients advisory, and, with the markets moving so rapidly, portfolio diversification. According to Zeltner, the focus of wealth management had to be advising clients on how to position their portfolio, and on carrying research on asset allocation and on investment management. With regard to the move of the Swiss National Bank to unpeg the Swiss franc from the euro, he affirmed "the sharp fall in the Swiss equity markets and the currency turmoil highlight the importance of portfolio diversification. Anyone who follows this principle and holds securities in all the world's major markets, hedging their currency risks, is financially better equipped to cope with this decision, giving UBS the opportunity to demonstrate to clients why they need us." In 2016, Zellner's work to improve private banking was appreciated even by his competition.

=== Activities and functions ===
- Member of the IMD Foundation Board, Lausanne

== Philanthropy ==
Zeltner was Chairman of the UBS Optimus Foundation until he retired from the UBS at end of 2017.

At the World Economic Forum of 2015, UBS presented the Davos Challenge, Walk for Education, encouraging 1000 delegates to walk for bicycles for children in South Africa. Zeltner took the challenge together with Axel A. Weber and other UBS participants.

== Publications ==
- June 2012
  - The changing face of wealth management
- November 2012
  - Portfolio returns in both good and bad times
- April 2013
  - The Wealth Management of the future
- November 2014
  - Aiming to create 'better insight from better data' - by Jürg Zeltner
- April 2015
  - "Wir reden über sehr viel Geld"
- September 2015
  - To survive and thrive, big banks need to collaborate and adapt - by Jürg Zeltner
- February 2016
  - Zeltner's Zeal for Private Banking
- September 2017
  - Seizing the Opportunities for Growth in Wealth Management
