= Paul Billerbeck =

Paul Billerbeck (4 April 1853 – 23 December 1932) was a Lutheran minister and scholar of Judaism, best known for his Commentary on the New Testament from the Talmud and Midrash (German, 1926) co-written with Hermann Strack.

Billerbeck was born in Bad Schönfließ, Neumark, Prussia and educated in Greifswald and Leipzig. Billerbeck's participation in Strack's Commentary on the New Testament from the Talmud and Midrash commenced in 1906 when Strack encouraged Billerbeck to compile and expand the material of John Lightfoot, Christian Schoettgen (1733) and Johann Jacob Wetstein for a new German commentary on the New Testament using rabbinical literature.

== Works ==
- Billerbeck, Paul; Strack, Hermann Leberecht (1922). Kommentar zum Neuen Testament aus Talmud und Midrasch: Book I: Das Evangelium nach Matthäus. München: Beck. OCLC 848243.
- ———; Strack, Hermann Leberecht (1924). Kommentar zum Neuen Testament aus Talmud und Midrasch: Book II: Das Evangelium nach Markus, Lukas und Johannes und die Apostelgeschichte. München: Beck. OCLC 848243.
- ———; Strack, Hermann Leberecht (1926). Kommentar zum Neuen Testament aus Talmud und Midrasch: Book III: Die Briefe des NT und die Offenbarung Johannis. München: Beck. OCLC 848243.
- ———; Strack, Hermann Leberecht (1928). Kommentar zum Neuen Testament aus Talmud und Midrasch: Book IV: Exkurse zu einzelnen Stellen des NT. München: Beck. OCLC 848243.

== Translations ==
- The Passover Meal, translated by Nathaniel J. Biebert (Red Brick Parsonage, 2013).
- Luke 18 and Fasting: Commentary on Luke 18:11b,12a, translated by Nathaniel J. Biebert (Red Brick Parsonage, 2013).
- John 10 and Hanukkah: Commentary on John 10:22-30, translated by Nathaniel J. Biebert (Red Brick Parsonage, 2013).
- Commentary on Luke 7:36-50, translated by Nathaniel J. Biebert (Red Brick Parsonage, 2013).
- Commentary on Matthew 5:13-14, translated by Nathaniel J. Biebert (Red Brick Parsonage, 2014).
