= Santes Pagnino =

Italian Dominican friar and philologist

Santes (or Xantes) Pagnino (Latin: Xanthus Pagninus) (1470–1536), also called Sante Pagnini or Santi Pagnini, was an Italian Dominican friar, and one of the leading philologists and Biblical scholars of his day.

== Biography ==
Pagnino was born 1470 at Lucca, in Tuscany, central Italy. At sixteen he took the religious habit at San Domenico in Fiesole, where he studied under the direction of Savonarola and other eminent professors. In acquiring the Semitic languages, then cultivated at Florence, he displayed unwonted quicksightedness, ease and penetration. His genius, industry and erudition won him influential friends, among them the Cardinals de'Medici, subsequently popes Leo X and Clement VII.

As a sacred orator his zeal and eloquence kept abreast with his erudition and were as fruitful. Summoned to Rome by Leo X, he taught at the recently opened free school for Semitic languages until his patron's death (1521).

He then spent three years at Avignon and the last seven years of his life at Lyon. Here he was instrumental in establishing a hospital for the plague-stricken, and by his zeal and eloquence, diverted an irruption of Waldensianism and Lutheranism from the city, receiving in acknowledgement the much coveted rights and privileges of citizenship. Here he also was in contact with the polymath and Hebraist Michael Servetus, whom he gave his notes to, and designated him as his heir to the scholarly study of the bible after he would have died. The epitaph of Pagnino, originally adorning his tomb in the Dominican church at Lyon, fixes the date of his death on 24 August 1541, at Lyon, beyond dispute.

== Writings ==
The merit of his Veteris et Novi Testamenti nova translatio (Lyon, 1527) is said to lie in its literal adherence to the Hebrew, which won for it the preference of contemporary rabbis and induced Leo X to assume the expenses of publication until his death. This version is also notable for introducing verse numbering in the New Testament, although the numbering system used there is not the same as the system used in modern bibles.

Several editions of it, as well as of the monumental Thesaurus linguæ sanctæ (Lyon, 1529), were brought out by Protestants as well as Catholics.

His other works all deal with scripture, Greek or Hebrew language. Among them were:

- Isagogae ad sacras literas liber unicus (Lyon, 1528, etc.)
- אוֹצַר לְשׁוֹן הַקֹּדֶשׁ, Thesaurus Linguae Sanctae sive Lexicon Hebraicum ("Treasury of the sacred language, or Hebrew lexicon") (1529)
- Catena argentea in Pentateuchum in six volumes (Lyon, 1536).
