= Philip Johann Bleibtreu =

Philip Johann Bleibtreu was born at Frankfurt-am-Main in the middle of the seventeenth century, he died there in 1702. Born by the name Meïr, he converted to Christianity from Judaism and took on Philip Johann Bleibtreu as his conversion name.

Bleibtreu published a German work entitled Meïr Naor (The Enlightened Meïr), a play on his Jewish name, Meïr. In 1787 he gave an account of his conversion in Frankfurt, notices on the Jewish festivals, and on some Jewish prayers. It is recorded that his last words were, "Ich bleibe treu" ("I remain faithful").
