= Georgius Chrysococca =

Greek physician, geographer, and astronomer

Georgius Chrysococca (Greek: Γεώργιος Χρυσοκόκκης, Georgios Chrysokokkes; fl. 1340s) was a Greek physician, geographer and astronomer.

He left a commentary astronomical system of medieval Persia, known as Syntaxis ton Person (Persian Compendium) recording a number of Perso-Arabic star and constellation names of c. the 11th century. This text circulated in late Byzantine-era astronomy and was also received in European astronomy in the 15th century. A partial Latin translation of the work is extant in manuscript form under the title Expositio In Syntaxin Persarum, in copies of the 15th and 16th century, one of these in the hand of Joseph Justus Scaliger.
