= Hermann Strack =

German Protestant theologian and orientalist (1848-1922)

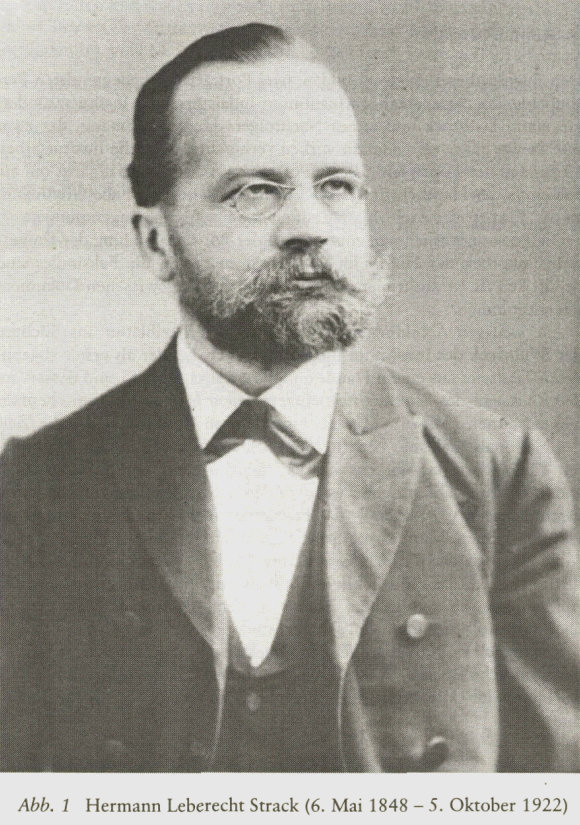
Hermann L. Strack.

Hermann Leberecht Strack (6 May 1848 – 5 October 1922) was a German Protestant theologian and orientalist; born in Berlin.

== Biography ==
From 1877, Strack was assistant professor of Old Testament exegesis and Semitic languages at the University of Berlin. He was the foremost Christian authority in Germany on Talmudic and rabbinic literature, and studied rabbinics under Steinschneider. Since the reappearance of anti-Semitism in Germany, Strack had been the champion of the Jews against the attacks of such men as Hofprediger Adolf Stoecker, Professor August Rohling, and others. In 1885 Strack became the editor of Nathanael. Zeitschrift für die Arbeit der Evangelischen Kirche an Israel, published at Berlin; and in 1883 he founded the Institutum Judaicum, which aimed at the conversion of Jews to Christianity. In the beginning of his career the Prussian government sent Strack to St. Petersburg to examine the Bible manuscripts there; on this occasion he examined also the antiquities of the Firkovich collection, which he declared to be forgeries. This claim was found to be untrue: the Firkovich collection is closely related to Cairo Geniza material found by Solomon Schechter.

== Selected works ==
- Prolegomena Critica in Vetus Testamentum Hebraicum (Leipzig, 1873);
- Katalog der Hebräschen Bibelhandschriften der Kaiserlichen Oeffentlichen Bibliothek in St. Petersburg (St. Petersburg and Leipzig, 1875), in collaboration with A. Harkavy;
- Prophetarum Posteriorum Codex Babylonicus Petropolitanus (ib. 1876);
- A. Firkowitch und Seine Entdeckungen (ib. 1876);
- editions of the Mishnah tractates Abot (Carlsruhe, 1882; 2d ed. Berlin, 1888), Yoma (ib. 1888), 'Abodah Zarah (ib. 1888), and Shabbat (ib. 1890);
- Hebräische Grammatik (Karlsruhe, 1883; 3d ed. Munchen, 1902); Hebrew Grammar (Berlin-London-New York, 1889; 2nd English ed.)
- Lehrbuch der Neuhebräischen Sprache und Litteratur (ib. 1884), in collaboration with Karl Siegfried;
- Herr Adolf Stöcker (ib. 1885; 2d ed. 1886);
- Einleitung in den Talmud (Leipzig, 1887; 2d ed. 1894), a revised reprint of his article on the subject in Herzog-Hauck's Real-Encyklopädie, to which he made a whole series of contributions on rabbinic subjects;
- Paradigmen zur Hebräischen Grammatik (Leipzig, 1887)
- Einleitung in das Alte Testament (Nördlingen, 1888; 5th ed. Munich, 1898);
- Der Blutaberglaube in der Menschheit, Blutmorde und Blutritus (ib. 1891; 5th ed. 1900), an investigation into the blood libel;
- Die Juden - Dürfen Sie 'Verbrecher von Religionswegen' genannt werden? (Berlin, 1893);
- Abriss des Biblischen Aramäisch (Leipzig, 1897).
- Jüdische Geheimgesetze? Mit 3 Anh.: Rohling, Ecker und kein Ende?. Artur Dinter u. Kunst, Wissenschaft, Vaterland. "Die Weisen von Zion" und ihre Gläubigen (Berlin 1920; ib. 3rd and 4th ed. 1921).
- Introduction to the Talmud & Midrash (1931), Jewish Publication Society of America, based on the 5th Edition of Einleitung in den Talmud & Midrasch.
- Kommentar zum Neuen Testament aus Talmud und Midrasch, with Paul Billerbeck; (1922–1928; 4 volumes).

From 1886 on, Strack worked together with Zoeckler at editing the Kurzgefasster Kommentar zu den Schriften des Alten und Neuen Testaments (Nördlingen and Munich). Strack was also a member of the Foreign Board of Consulting Editors of the Jewish Encyclopedia.

== Translations ==
- The Passover Meal, translated by Nathaniel J. Biebert (Red Brick Parsonage, 2013).
- Luke 18 and Fasting: Commentary on Luke 18:11b,12a, translated by Nathaniel J. Biebert (Red Brick Parsonage, 2013).
- John 10 and Hanukkah: Commentary on John 10:22-30, translated by Nathaniel J. Biebert (Red Brick Parsonage, 2013).
- Commentary on Luke 7:36-50, translated by Nathaniel J. Biebert (Red Brick Parsonage, 2013).
- Commentary on Matthew 5:13-14, translated by Nathaniel J. Biebert (Red Brick Parsonage, 2014).
