= Johann Balhorn the Younger =

German printer

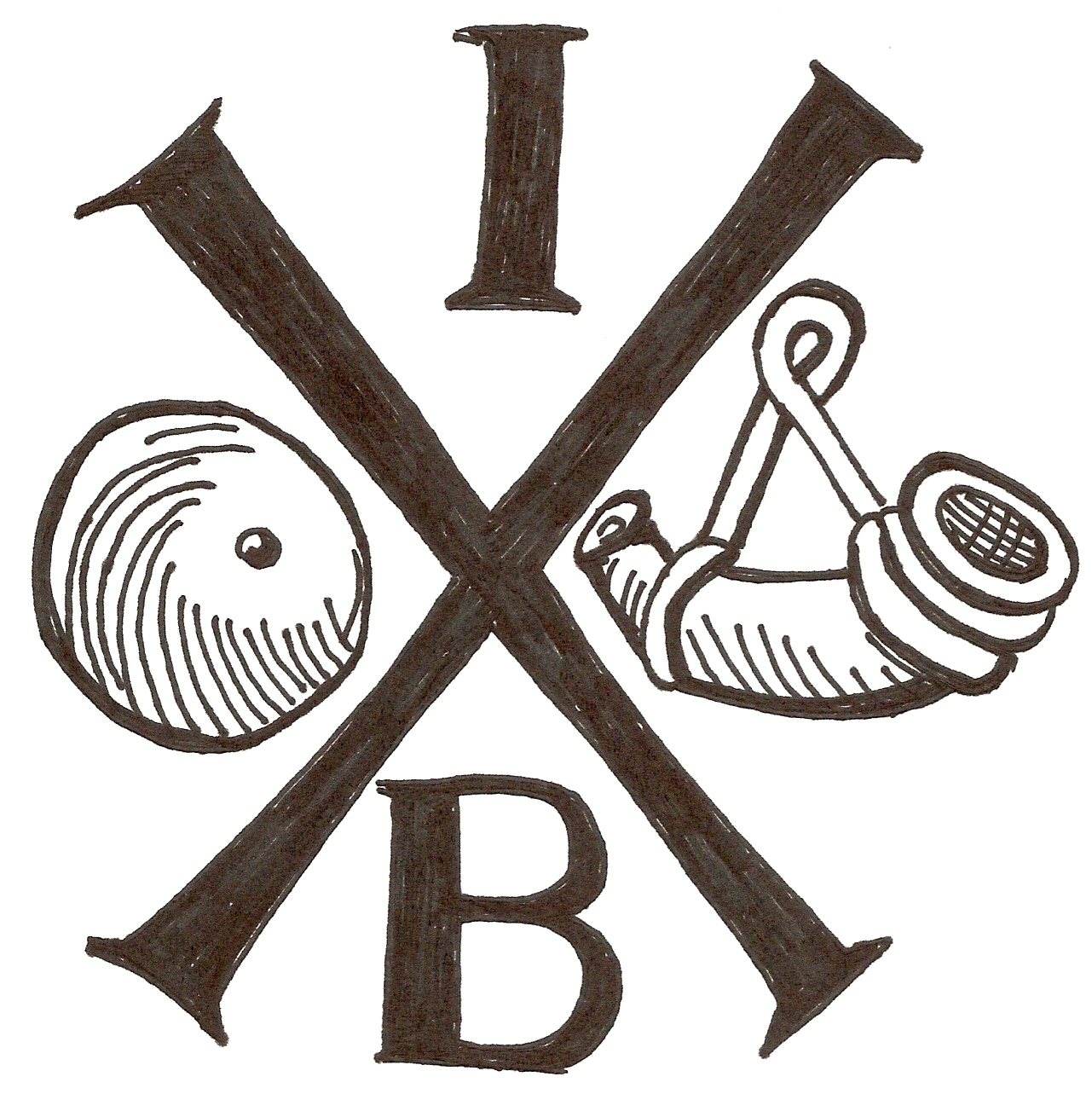
Printer's mark used by both Johann Balhorn the Elder and Johann Balhorn the Younger

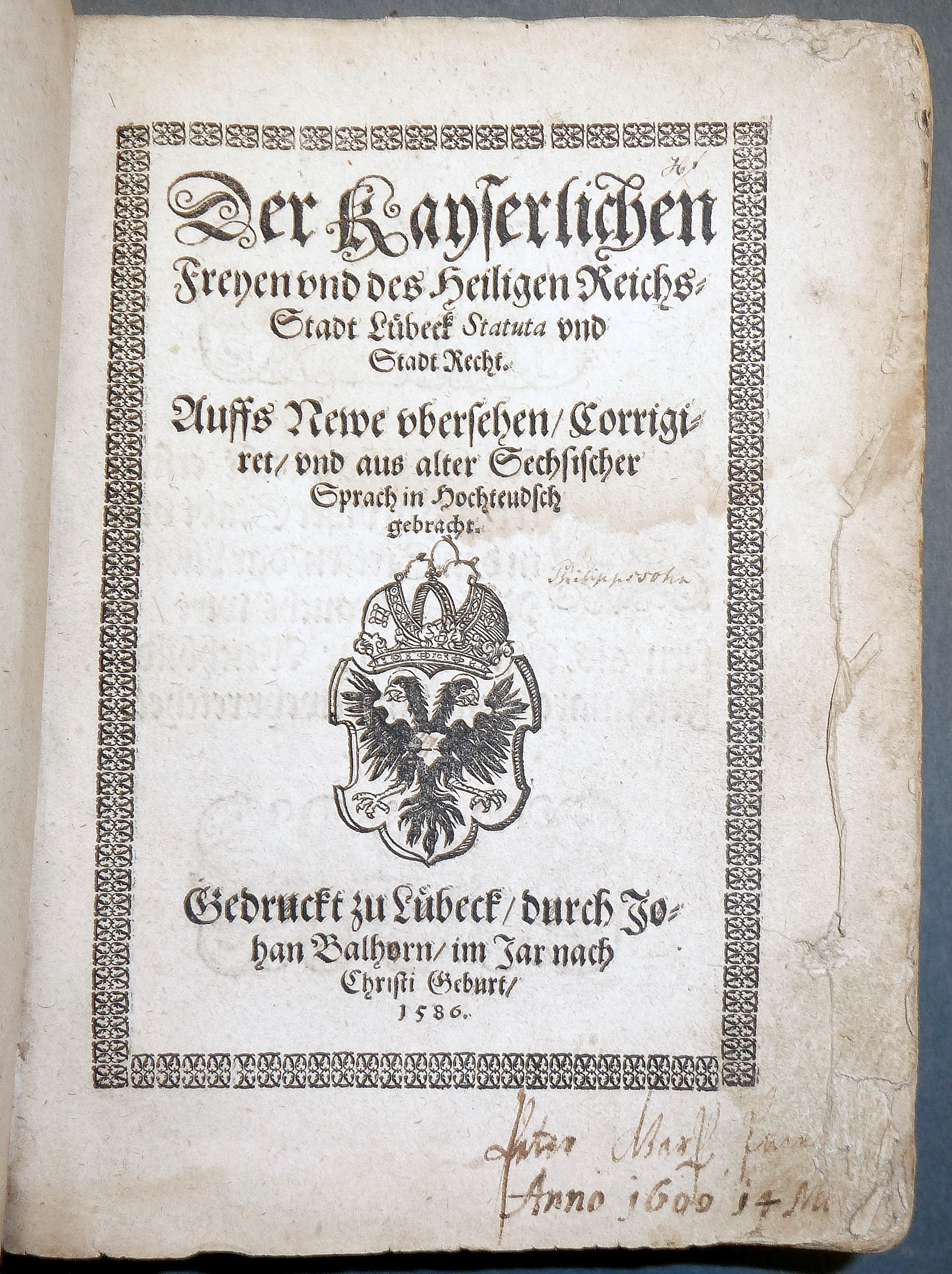
Der Kayserlichen Freyen und des Heiligen Reichs Stadt Lübeck Statuta und Stadtrecht, 1586

Johann Balhorn the Younger (sometimes mistakenly spelled Ballhorn) (born 1550, died after 1604) was a German printer in Lübeck. He followed his father, Johann Balhorn the Elder in the printing trade, from whom he took over the printing house. Both used as a monogram the pictured printer's mark and a seal with a horn and three balls. In a play on their name the German word verballhornen, which means "parody", was coined.

== Life ==
Johann Balhorn was the son of the printer Johann Balhorn the Elder and his second or third wife Elsabe (died after 18 October 1588). He had at least five siblings, two of whom died in childhood. The printer Jochim Balhorn, who died in 1559, was either his grandfather or uncle.

The elder Balhorn died in 1573, and his son took over his father's printing business in his own name in 1575, shortly after he attained legal age. In 1578 he married Ermgard Ehlers (born 1555 probably in Lübeck, died 1595 or later). The couple had no known children. In 1584 he and Asswerus Kröger were the only accredited book printers in Lübeck.

He primarily printed religious works and textbooks, but above all he expanded the existing assortment of "anything from almanacs, occasional poetry and pamphlets to eiifying works, sermons, and statute books." In addition he printed practical works, for example, how to navigate with sextants, the determination of ebb and flow, or about mercantile accounting. "Both the range of his books and the craftsmanship with which he executed them were fairly average." He mainly printed works in Low German, but also produced publications in High German, Latin, Danish and Swedish. Among his 80 or so printed works a few stand out: Johannes Stricker's spiritual play De Düdesche Schlömer (1584) as well as a Low German translation of the popular book Historia of D. Johann Fausten (1588).

His most famous, but also most disparaged, work was an insufficiently revised High German version of the Lübeck law, done on assignment from the Lübeck Council from Mayor Johann Lüdinghusen, Syndikus Calixtus Schein, and Councilman Gottschalk von Stiten: Der Kayserlichen Freyen und des Heiligen Reichs-Stadt Lübeck Statuta und Stadt Recht. Auffs Newe vbersehen / Corrigiret / und aus alter sechsischer Sprach in Hochteudsch gebracht. Gedruckt zu Lübeck / durch Johann Balhorn / im Jar nach Christi Geburt / 1586.. Since the persons responsible did not name themselves on the title page, and there only the reference to the printer, the published edition was quoted accordingly. From this developed the phrase "Improved by Johann Balhorn" (Verbessert durch Johann Balhorn), which has been known since 1644, or, more simply, the term "verballhornen", with the meaning of "mess something up with the intention of correcting it", to "disimprove."

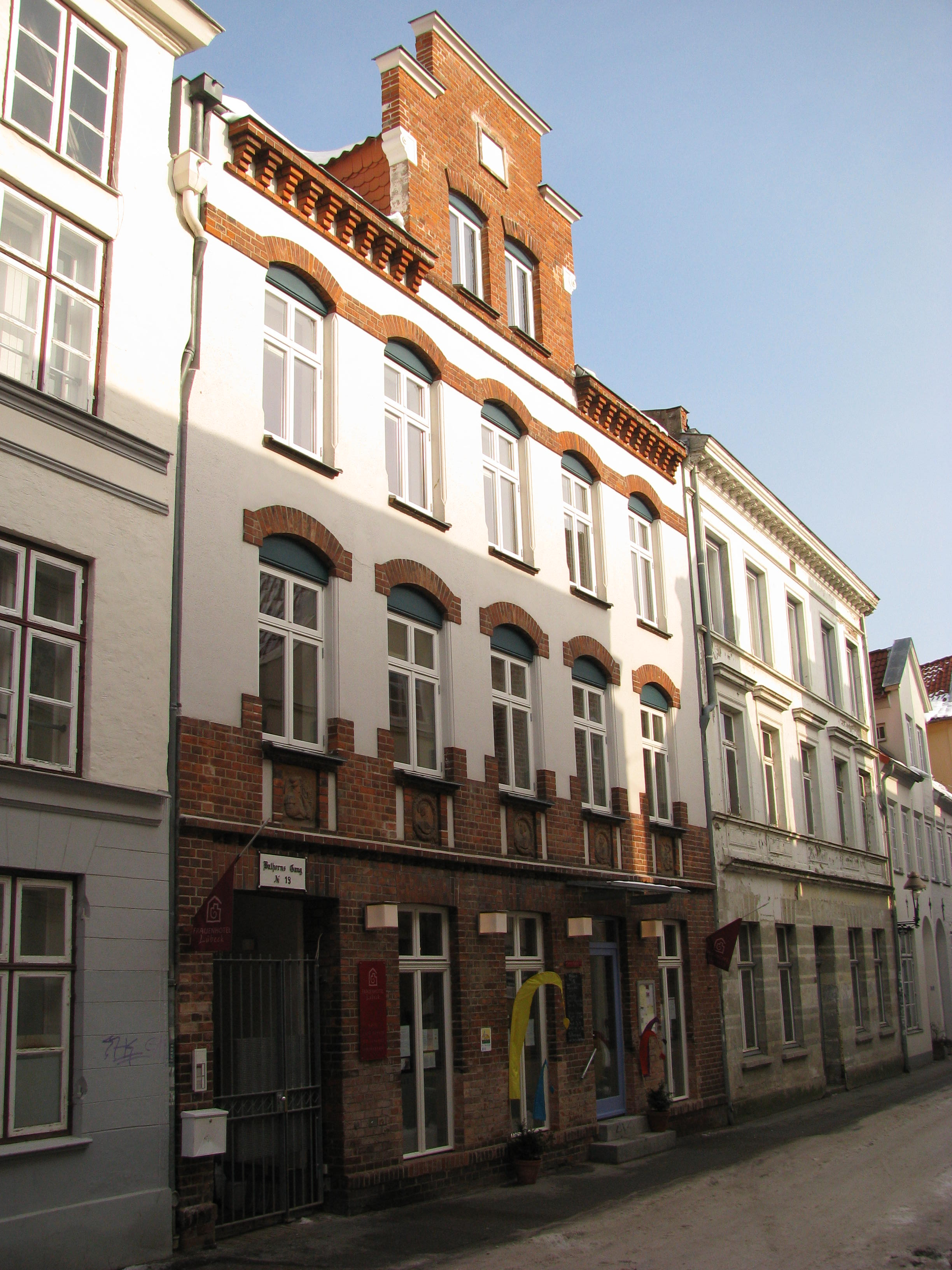
Grundstück Hundestraße 19–23, Today a wonen's hotel

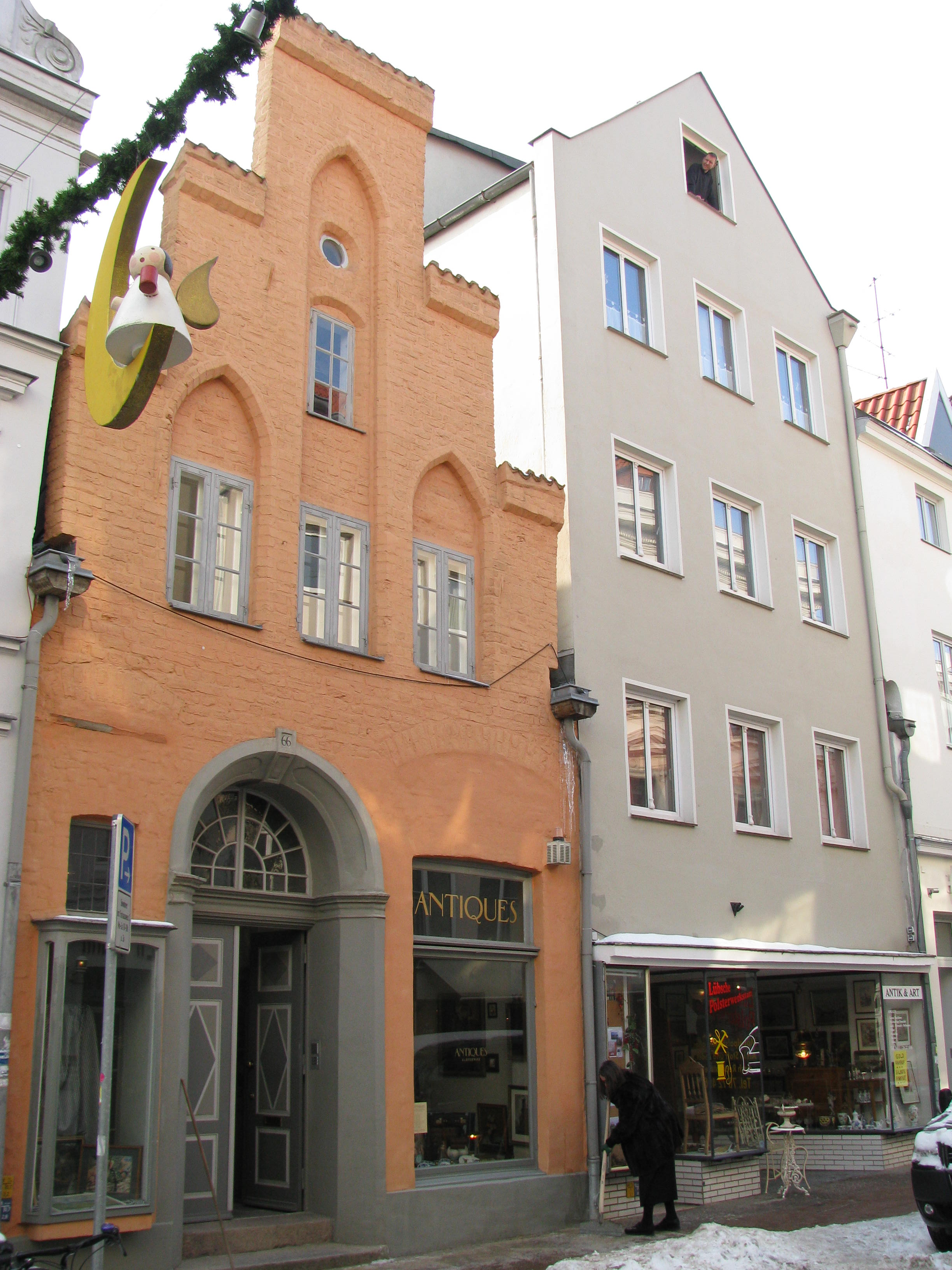
Right: Ground floor of Hüxstraße 64

The property of the Johann Balhorn family included the houses Königstraße 61 (1534–1569), Breite Straße 60 (southern half, 1541–1588), Hundestrasse 19, 21, 23 (1554–1588) and Hüxstraße 64 (1587–1604). Between 1588 and early 1604 he sold the landed property of the family in Lübeck. This may have been because of long-standing economic difficulties due to increasing competition. After 1604, the year of his last known publication, all track of him is lost.
