= Etienne Morin =

Étienne Morin (born around 1717, perhaps in the region of Cahors and died in Kingston, Jamaica in 1771), was a trader acting between the Caribbean and Bordeaux. He is best known for the central role he played in Freemasonry in the genesis of the Ancient and Accepted Scottish Rite.
