= Marco Marini =

Italian orientalist (1542–1594)

Marco Marini (Brescia 1542 – 20 May 1594) was an Italian orientalist, and censor of Hebrew language publications for the Vatican. He prepared the first published edition of Targum Yerushalmi.

== Biography ==
Marco Marini was born in Brescia to a wealthy and noble family. At a young age, he entered the Canons Regular of the Congregation of S. Salvatore in San Giovanni of Brescia. He engaged in Oriental studies and studied Hebrew with Paolo Veneto, a converted Jew who was also a member of the same Congregation. He authored a commentary on Psalms and a Hebrew-Latin dictionary. Among other things, he was charged by the Index with the censorship of several Hebrew books, including Rosh Emuna of Abravanel, the commentary of Obadja Sforno, and Midrash Rabba. He died in Brescia in 1594.

== Works ==
- ms61 – a translation into Hebrew of the Gospels of Matthew and Mark from the convent of the Canons Regular of San Salvatore at Candiana, where Marini was a canon in 1568.
- The first edition of Targum Yerushalmi.
- a Hebrew grammar entitled Gan Eden [The Garden of Eden]. Basel: Froben. 1580.
- a Hebrew dictionary entitled Tebat Noah [Noah's Ark]. Venice: Degara. 1593.
