= Valentin Schindler =

Lutheran Hebraist

Valentin Schindler (14 February 1543 – 11 June 1604) was a Lutheran Hebraist and professor of the University of Wittenberg, where he was an important teacher of the Hebrew language. He moved by 1594 to Helmstedt.

He is known for his dictionary "Lexicon Pentaglotton: Hebraicum, Chaldicum, Syriacum, Talmudico-Rabbinicum, et Arabicum", in which the vocabulary of Hebrew and of four other Semitic languages is translated to Latin. It was published posthumously in 1612, one year before the 1613 Arabic-Latin lexicon of Franciscus Raphelengius. An abridgement was published in 1637 by William Alabaster.
