= Christian Reineccius =

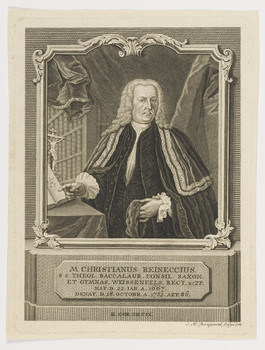
Christian Reineccius

Christian Reineccius (22 January 1668 – 18 October 1752, aged 84) was an 18th-century Saxon theologian. He was born in Großmühlingen in the Principality of Anhalt-Zerbst.

As rector of the gymnasium of Weissenfels, his writings served the study of Hebrew. He translated the Old and the New Testament into four languages (Leipzig, 1713–48).

== Sources ==
Marie-Nicolas Bouillet and Alexis Chassang (dir.), "Chrétien Reineccius" in Dictionnaire universel d’histoire et de géographie, (1878)
