= Jacques Basnage =

French Protestant divine, preacher, linguist, writer and man of affairs

Jacques Beauval
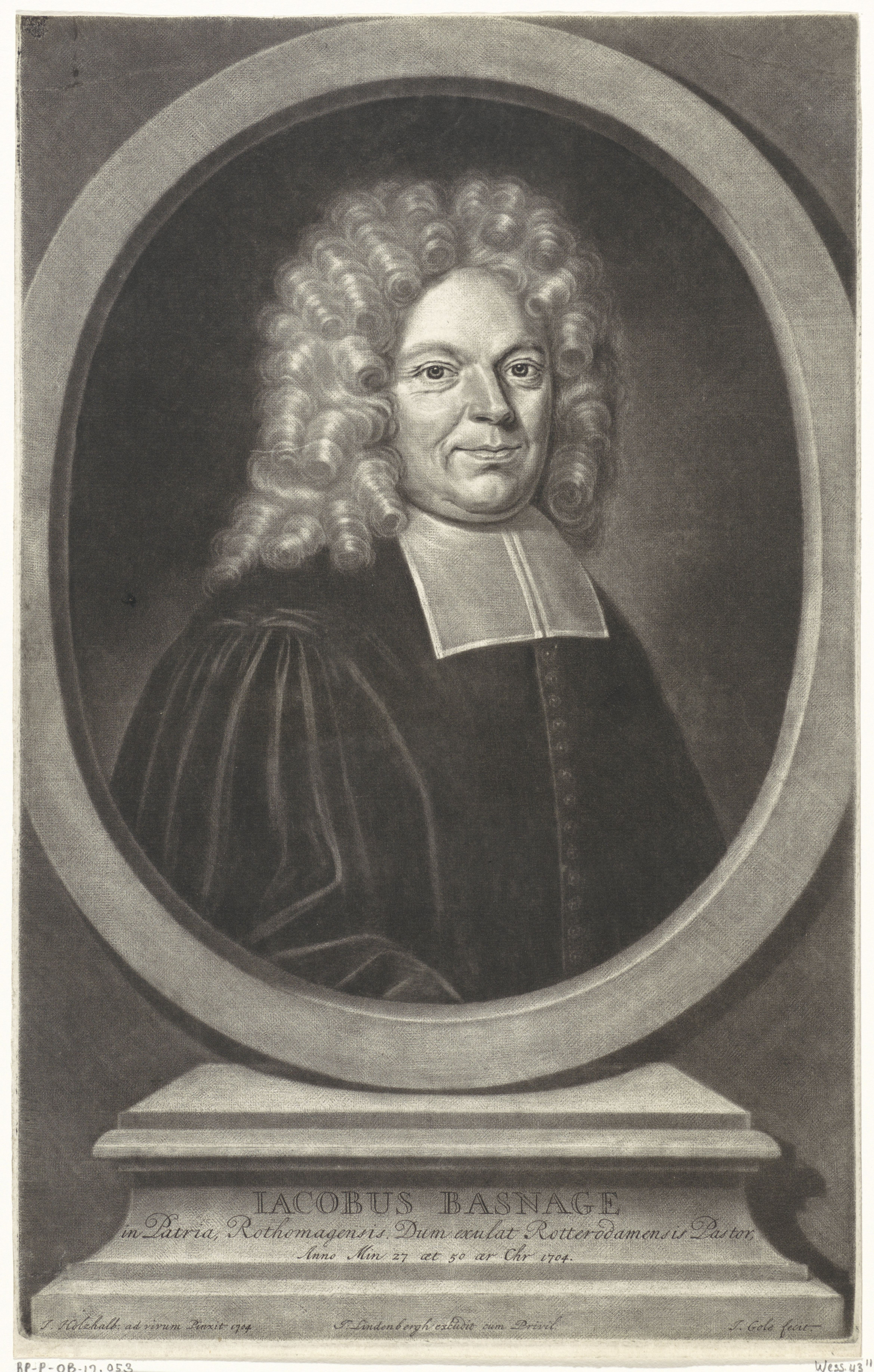
- Born: 8 August 1653; Rouen France
- Died: 22 December 1723 (aged 70)
- Occupation: Writer
- Parent: Henri Franquesnay

Jacques Basnage De Beauval (8 August 1653 – 22 December 1723) was a celebrated French Protestant divine, preacher, linguist, writer and man of affairs. He wrote a History of the Reformed Churches and on Jewish Antiquities.

== Biography ==
Jacques Basnage was born at Rouen in Normandy, the eldest son of the eminent lawyer Henri Basnage de Franquesnay. He studied classical languages at Saumur and afterwards theology at Geneva. He was pastor at Rouen from 1676 till 1685, when, on the revocation of the edict of Nantes, he obtained leave of the king to retire to Holland. He settled at Rotterdam as a minister pensionary till 1691, when he was chosen pastor of the Walloon church.

In 1709, the grand pensionary Anthonie Heinsius secured his election as one of the pastors of the Walloon church at The Hague, intending to employ him mainly in civil affairs. Accordingly, he was engaged in a secret negotiation with Marshal d'Uxelles, plenipotentiary of France at the congress of Utrecht. He was then entrusted with several further important commissions.

In 1716, Dubois, who was at The Hague at the instance of the regent Orleans, for the purpose of negotiating the Triple Alliance between France, Great Britain and Holland, sought the advice of Basnage, who, in spite of the fact that he had failed to receive permission to return to France on a short visit the year before, did his best to further the negotiations. The French government also turned to him for help in view of the threatened rising in the Cevennes.

Basnage had welcomed the revival of the Protestant church by the zeal of Antoine Court. He assured the regent that no danger of active resistance was to be feared from it. True to the principles of Calvin, he denounced the rebellion of the Camisards in his Instructions pastorales aux Réformés de France sur l'obéissance due aux souverains (1720), which was printed by order of the court and scattered broadcast in the south of France.

== Works ==
His works include several dogmatic and polemical treatises, but the most important are the historical. Of these may be mentioned Histoire de la religion des églises reformées (Rotterdam, 1690), the Histoire de l'église depuis Jésus-Christ jusqu'à présent (ib. 1699)—both of them written from the point of view of Protestant polemics—and, of greater scientific value, the Histoire des Juifs (Rotterdam, 1706, Eng. trans. 1708) and the Antiquités judaiques ou remarques critiques sur la république des Hébreux (1713). He also wrote short explanatory introductions and notes to a collection of copper-plate engravings, much valued by connoisseurs, called Histoires du Vieux et du Nouveau Testament, représentées par des figures gravées en taille-douce par R. de Hooge (Amsterdam, 1704).

== Other works ==
- Examen des méthodes proposées par Mrs de l'assemblée du clergé de France, en l'année 1682, a Cologne: chez Pierre Marteau, 1684
- 'T Groot Waerelds Tafereel, verbeeldende in Konst-Prenten de Heilige en Waereldsche Geschiedenissen, zedert den Aanvang des Waerelds tot het uiteinde van de Openbaring van Johannes .... Amsterdam, J. Lindenbergh, 1704
- L'unité, la visibilité, l'autorité de l'eglise et la verite renversées, par la constitution de Clement XI. Amsterdam, 1715

He was elected a Fellow of the Royal Society in 1697.
