= Gustav Georg Zeltner =

German theologian (1672–1738)

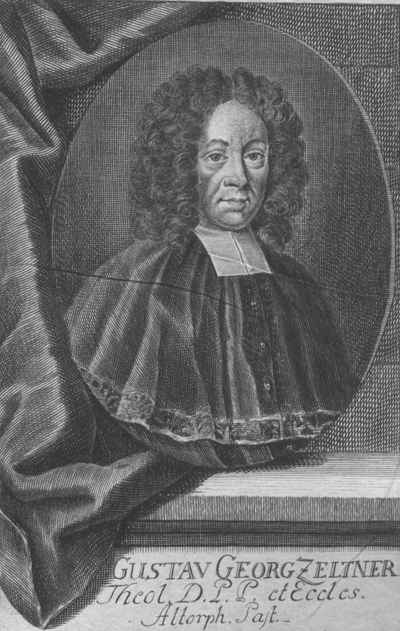
- Born: 16 September 1672; Hilpoltstein
- Died: 20 July 1738 (aged 65); Poppenreuth
- Education: magister degree, Doctor of Theology
- Alma mater: University of Jena
- Occupation: Theologian, university teacher

Gustav Georg Zeltner (16 September 1672, in Hiltpoltstein – 20 July 1738, in Poppenreuth) was a Lutheran theologian. Zeltner wrote numerous theological and historical works.

== Life ==
From 1689 to 1694 he studied philosophy and theology at the University of Jena. In 1695 he assumed the position of inspector of the alumni in Altdorf. In 1698 he moved to Nuremberg and worked as a vicar and as a professor of metaphysics at the Aegidianum. Two years later he was appointed deacon at St. Sebaldus Church, Nuremberg.

During his time in Nuremberg, Zeltner get his doctorate in theology and returned to Altdorf in 1706 to teach theology and oriental studies at the local university. In 1730 he was accepted as an external member of the Prussian Academy of Sciences.

Zeltner spent his retirement in Poppenreuth, where he held the position of pastor from 1730 until his death.

== Works ==
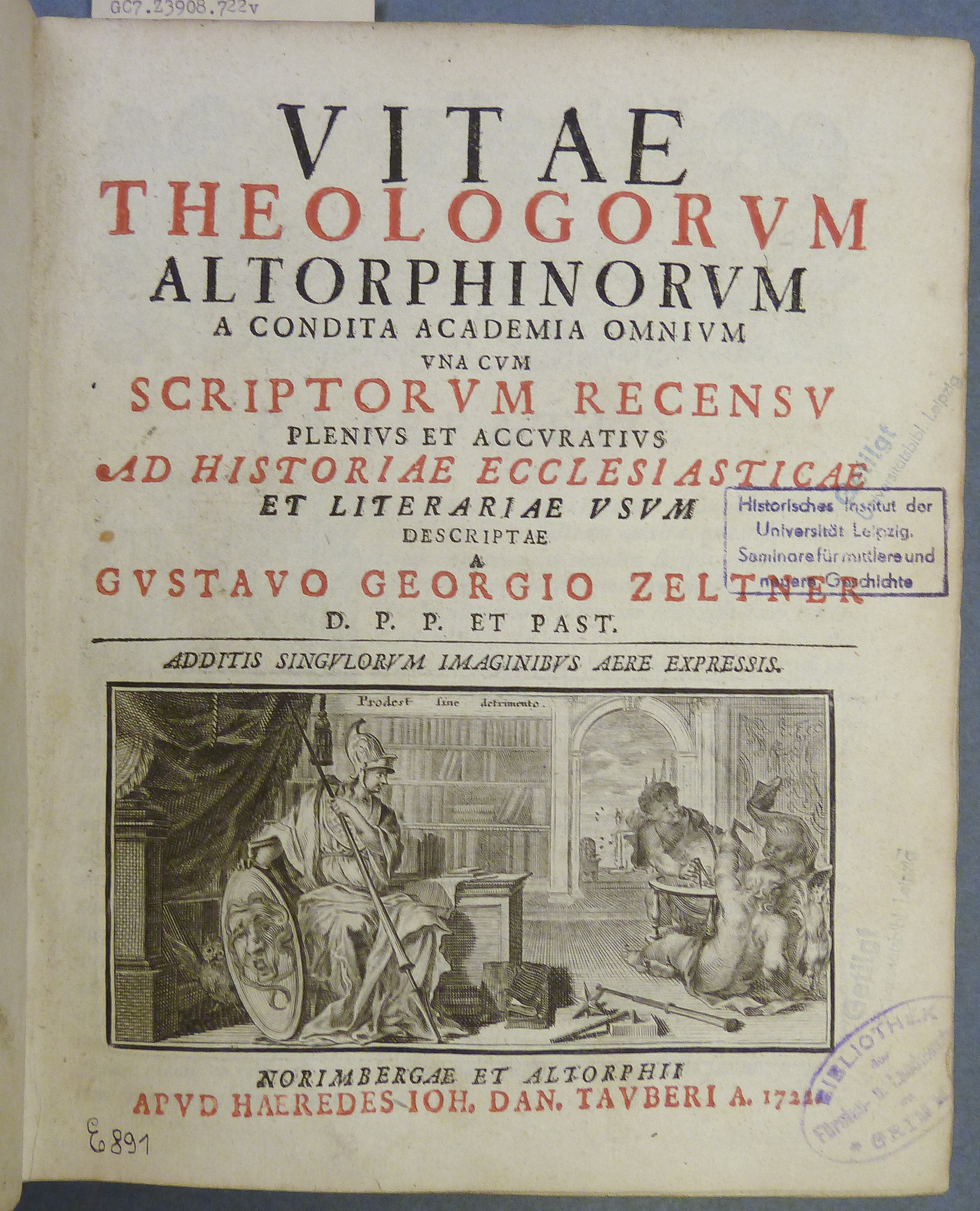
Titelblatt der Vitae theologorum Altorphinorum a condita Academia, 1722

- Deborae inter prophetissas eruditio tanquam eruditarum foeminarum ex Hebraea gente specimen, 1708
- De erudita virgine Iudaea per transennam docente. Altdorf 1717
- Vitae theologorum Altorphinorum a condita Academia, 1722
- Evangelium tetragrammaton e Novo Testamento exulans. Recusa a J.G. Kohlesio. 1722.
- Historia Crypto-Socinismi Altorfinae quondam Academiae infesti arcana, 2 Bde., 1729

== Literature ==
- Paul Tschackert (1900). "Zeltner, Gustav Georg" . Allgemeine Deutsche Biographie (in German). Vol. 45. Leipzig: Duncker & Humblot. pp. 52–53.
