= Willem Surenhuis =

Dutch Christian scholar of Hebrew

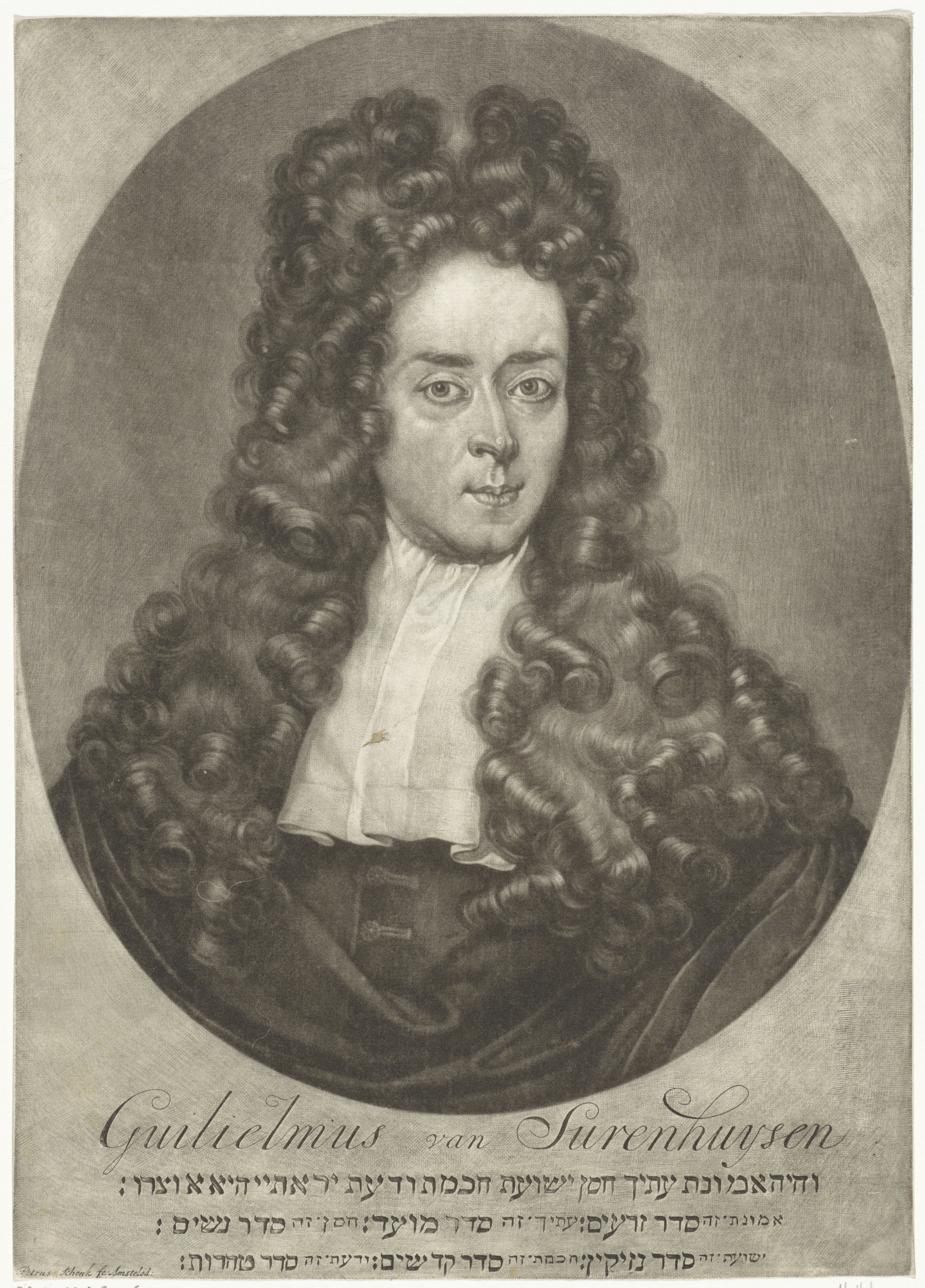
Willem Surenhuys

Willem Surenhuis (also Surenhuys or Surenhusius, c.1664 in Rottum – 1729) was a Dutch Christian scholar of Hebrew, known for his Latin translation of the Mishnah, the first of the complete work. It was published from 1698 to 1703. The son of a German-born minister, he studied at the University of Groningen and later taught in Amsterdam.
