= Adriaan Reland =

Dutch scholar (1676–1718)

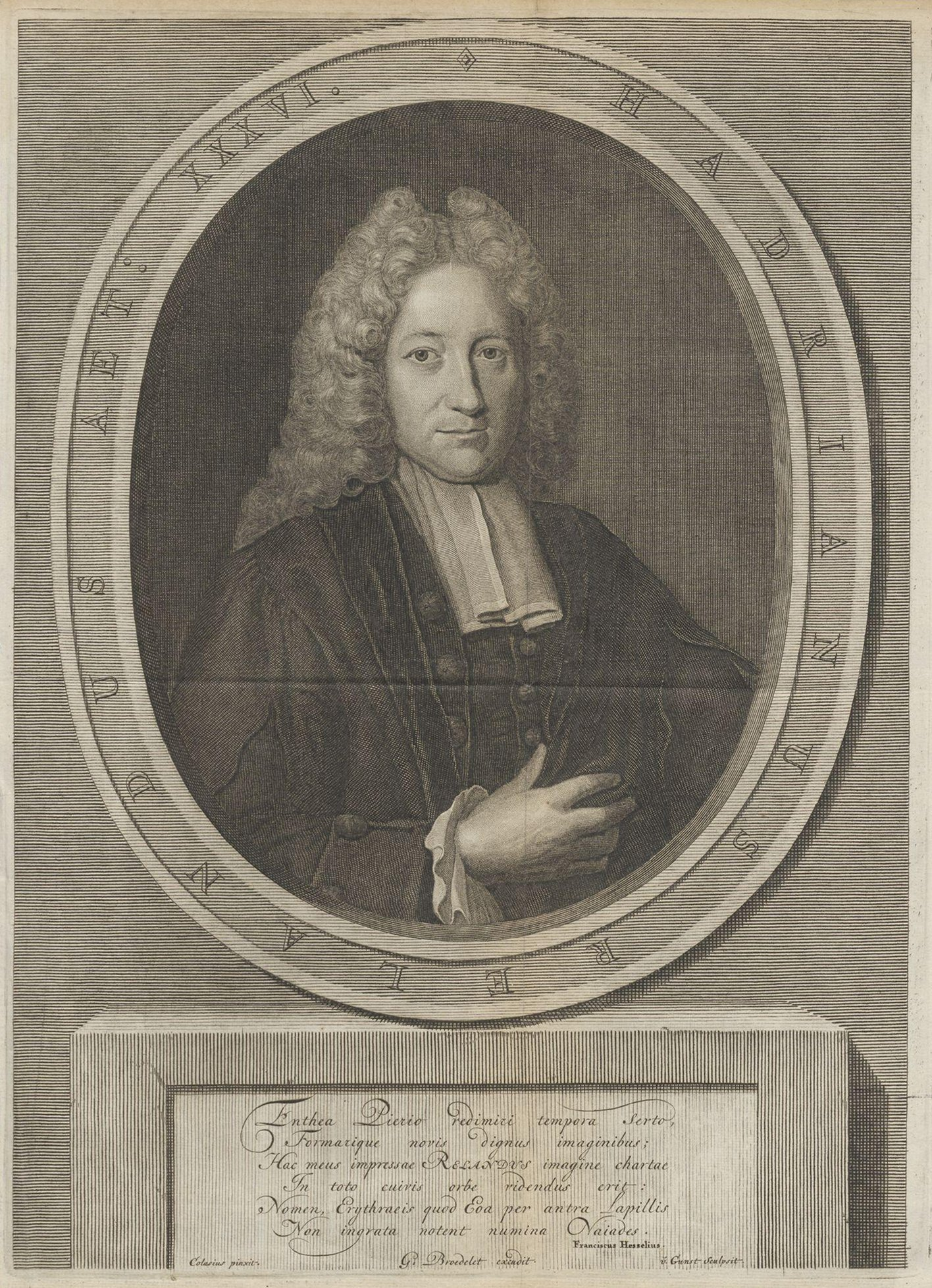
- Engraving of Reland, c. 1712
- Born: 17 July 1676; De Rijp, North Holland
- Died: 5 February 1718 (aged 41); Utrecht
- Education: University of Utrecht
- Occupations: Orientalist, cartographer, philologist
- Known for: Studies of Islam, Palestine, Persian, and Japan; early modern cartography of Asia and the Near East
- Notable work: De religione Mohammedica libri duo; Palaestina ex monumentis veteribus illustrata; Antiquitates sacrae veterum Hebraeorum

Adriaan Reland (also known as Adriaen Reeland/Reelant, Hadrianus Relandus; 17 July 1676 – 5 February 1718) was a Dutch Orientalist scholar, cartographer and philologist. Even though he never left the Netherlands, he made significant contributions to Middle Eastern and Asian linguistics and cartography, including Persia, Japan and Palestine during the biblical ages (the Holy Land).

== Early life ==
Reland was the son of Johannes Reland, a Protestant minister, and Aagje Prins in the small North Holland village of De Rijp. Adriaan's brother, Peter (1678–1714), was an influential lawyer in Haarlem. Reland first studied Latin language in Amsterdam at age 11, and enrolled at University of Utrecht in 1693, at age 17, to study theology and philosophy. Initially interested in Hebrew and Syriac, he later began studying Arabic. In 1699, after obtaining his doctorate in Utrecht, Reland moved to Leiden and tutored the son of Hans Willem Bentinck, 1st Earl of Portland. The latter invited him to move to England, but Reland declined because of his father's deteriorating health.

== Academic career ==
In 1699, Reland was appointed Professor of Physics and Metaphysics at the University of Harderwijk. By this point, he had achieved a good knowledge of Arabic, Hebrew, and other Semitic languages. In 1701, at age 25, he was appointed Professor of Oriental Languages at the University of Utrecht. Beginning in 1713, he also taught Hebrew Antiquities. This was extended with a chair in Jewish Antiquity. Reland was never able to visit the regions he described in his works, due to his sickly father.

Reland gained renown for his research in Islamic studies and linguistics; his work being an early example of comparative linguistics. Additionally, he studied Persian and was interested in the relation of Eastern myths to the Old Testament. He published a work concerning East Asian myths, Dissertationum miscellanearum partes tres, in 1708. Moreover, he discovered the link for the Malay language to the Western Pacific dictionaries of Willem Schouten and Jacob Le Maire.

== Research on Middle East ==
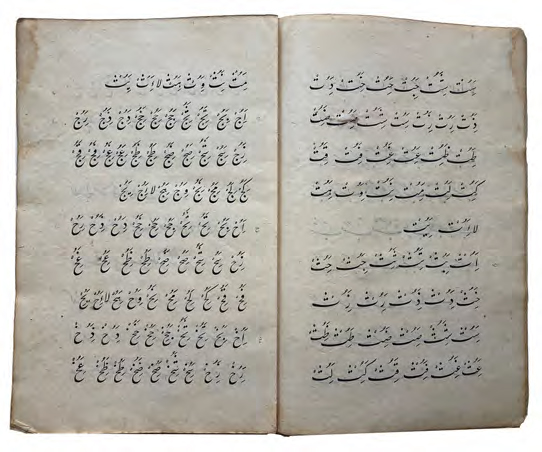
Manuscript of Reland's work on the foundations of the Persian language (Prima elementa linguae persicae nitidissime conscriptae Adriani Relandi). Printed in Utrecht, dated 1705

Reland, through compiling Arabic texts, completed De religione Mohammedica libri duo in 1705. This work, extended in 1717, was considered the first objective survey of Islamic beliefs and practices. It quickly became a reference work throughout Europe and was translated into Dutch, English, German, French and Spanish.

Reland also extensively researched Middle Eastern locations and biblical geography, taking interest in Palestine. He published Antiquitates Sacrae veterum Hebraeorum (1708) and Palaestina ex monumentis veteribus illustrata (1714), in which he described and mapped the biblical peoples, and ancient geography of Palestine.

Reland retained his professorship for his entire life, and additionally became a noted poet. In 1718, at age 41, he died of smallpox in Utrecht.

== Cartography ==
"Nova Imperii Persici deliniatio", a map of the Persian Empire based on the geographical research of Adriaan Reland and engraved by Matthaeus Seutter, Augsburg, c. 1727.

Reland also produced several maps based on his research into the geography of Asia and the Near East. His cartographic work formed part of his broader scholarly interest in the languages, history, and religions of eastern regions.

Among his geographical works was a map of the Persian Empire published in 1705. The map attempted to reconcile information from Persian and Arabic geographical traditions with existing European cartography and introduced Persian place-names more systematically to European readers.

Reland also published a map of Japan in 1715. Unlike many contemporary European maps, it relied heavily on Japanese geographical sources. The map later served as the basis for the map of Japan included in Engelbert Kaempfer's History of Japan (1729).

In addition to these works, Reland produced maps relating to Palestine and other parts of Asia, reflecting his attempt to combine linguistic scholarship with geographical reconstruction of regions described in historical texts.

== Selection of published works ==
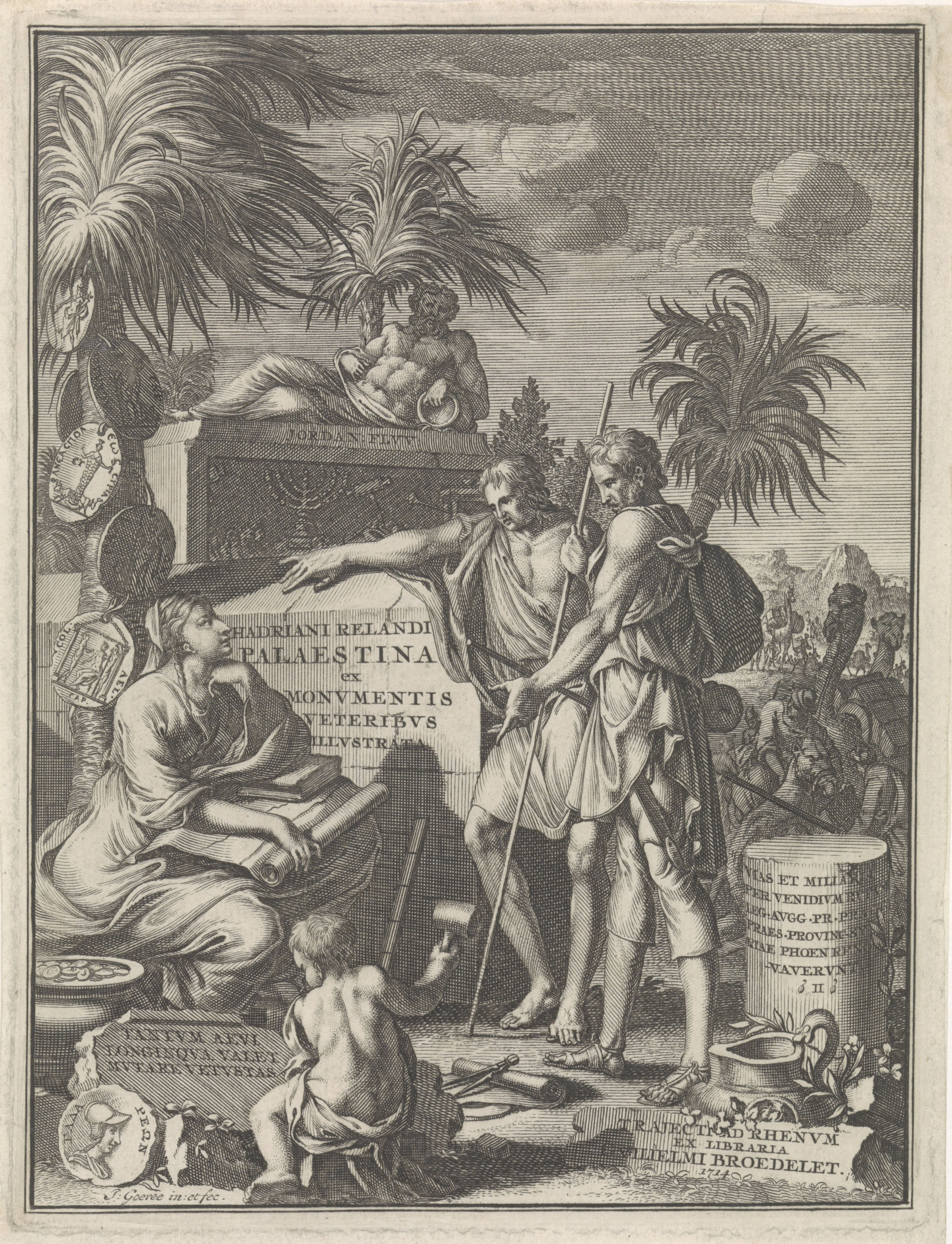
Frontispiece of Adriaan Reland's Palaestina ex monumentis veteribus illustrata

- De religione Mohammedica libri duo – the first European attempt to systematically describe Islamic religious practices. Utrecht 1705, 1717
  - Dutch Translation Verhandeling van de godsdienst der Mahometaanen, als mede van het krygs-regt by haar ten tyde van oorlog tegens de christenen gebruykelyk. Utrecht 1718
  - English translation: Of the Mahometan Religion, Two books. London 1712
  - German translation: Zwey Bücher von der Türkischen oder Mohammedischen Religion. Hannover 1716, 1717
  - French translation: La Religion des Mahometans exposée par leurs propres Docteurs, avec des éclaircissemens sur les opinions qu'on leur a Faussement attribuées. The Hague 1721
- Palaestina ex monumentis veteribus illustrata – a detailed geographical survey of biblical Palestine, written in Latin. Published by Willem Broedelet. Utrecht 1714
  - Dutch translation: Palestina opgeheldert. Ofte de Gelegentheyd van het Joodsche land.
- Analecta rabbinica. Utrecht 1702, 1723
- Dissertationum miscellanearum partes tres. Utrecht 1706–1708, 3 Teile
- Antiquitates sacrae veterum Hebraeorum. Utrecht 1708, 3. uppl. 1717, 1741
- De nummis veterum Hebraeorum. Utrecht 1709
- Brevis introductio ad grammaticam Hebraeam Altingianam. Utrecht 2. uppl. 1710, 1722
- De natuurlijke wijsgeer – a Dutch translation of Ibn Tufail's Arabic novel Hayy ibn Yaqdhan. Printed by Pieter van der Veer. Amsterdam 1701
- Galatea. Lusus poetica – a collection of Latin love-elegies, which brought Reland some fame as a Neo-Latin poet. Amsterdam 1701

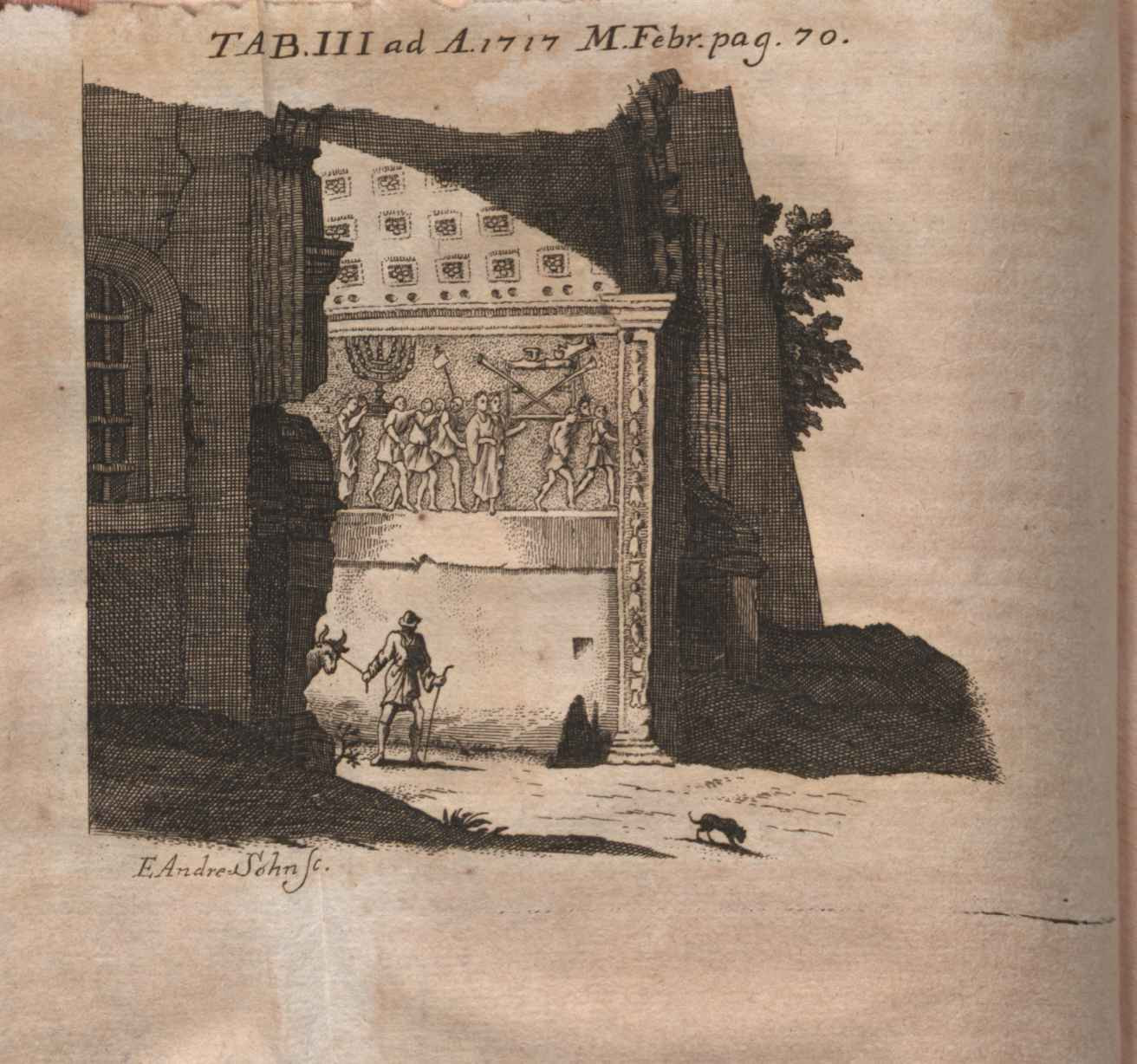
Image from critique of Hadriani Relandi de spoliis templi Hierosolymitani published in Acta Eruditorum, 1717

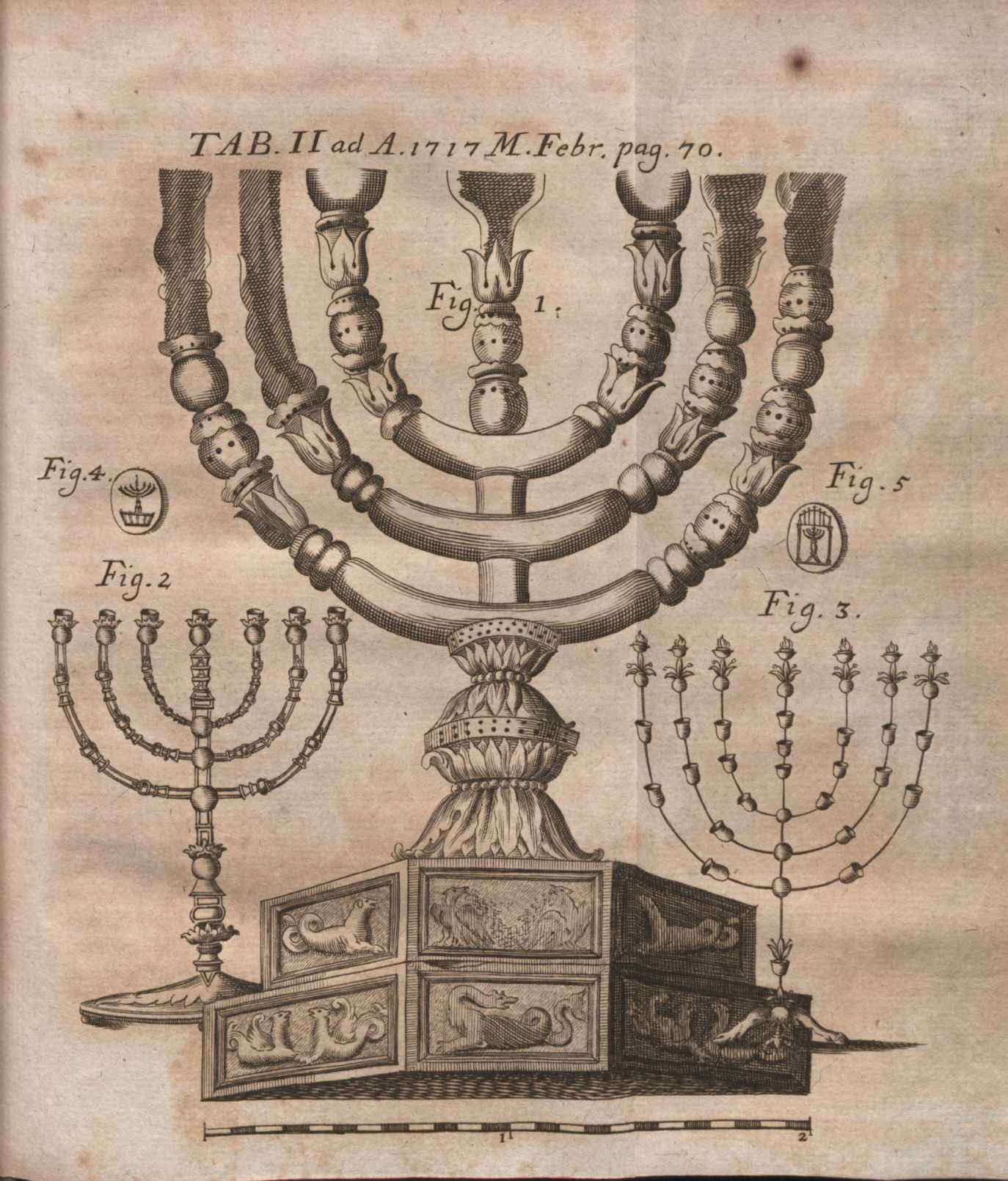
Image from critique of Hadriani Relandi de spoliis templi Hierosolymitani published in Acta Eruditorum, 1717

== Gallery ==
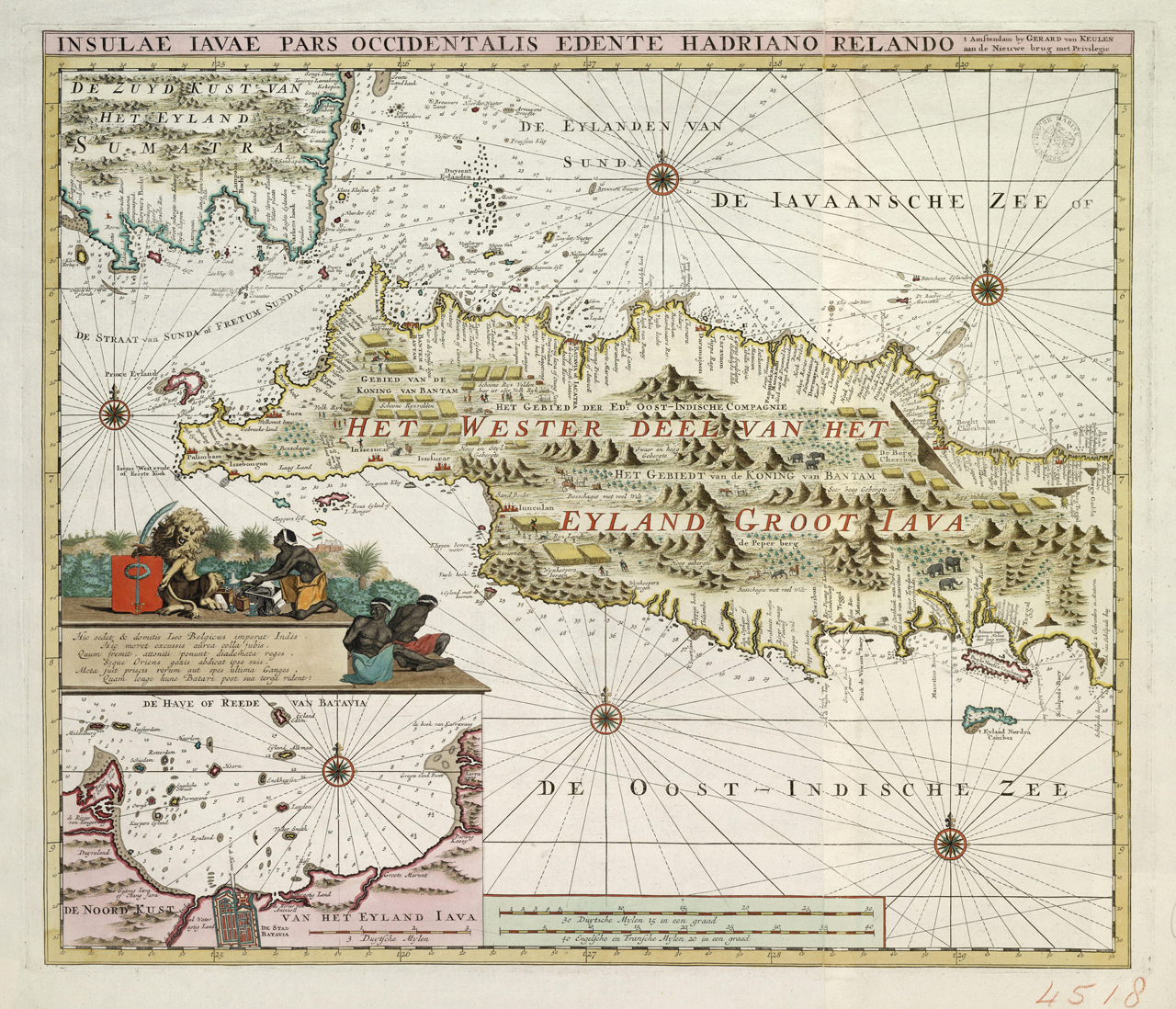
Map of Western Java, 1718.

== Bibliography ==
- The Orient in Utrecht: Adriaan Reland (1676-1718), Arabist, Cartographer, Antiquarian and Scholar of Comparative Religion. Jaski, Bart; Lange, Christian; Pytlowany, Anna; Rinsum, Henk J. van editors. Leiden and Boston, Brill, 2021. Link to PDF. ISBN 978-90-04-46217-5. Also The Orient in Utrecht: Adriaan Reland (1676-1718), Arabist, Cartographer, Antiquarian and Scholar of Comparative Religion at JSTOR
- Patrick Poppe: „Veritas ubicunque est indagari debet ...“ Das Vorwort von Adrian Relands (1676–1718) De Religione Mohammedica als ‚aufklärerisches‘ Programm, In: Johannes Birgfeld, Stephanie Catani, Anne Conrad Hrsg.: Aufklärungen. Strategien und Kontroversen vom 17. bis 21. Jahrhundert. Universitätsverlag Winter, Heidelberg 2022, S. 277–289.
