= Giuseppe de' Medici, 10th Prince of Ottaiano =

Italian noble and courtier

Giuseppe de 'Medici of Ottajano, Prince of Ottajano (7 January 1843, in Naples – 9 June 1894, in Naples) was an Italian noble and courtier.

A member of a cadet branch of the Medici family, called the Princes of Ottajano, he also possessed the titles of Prince of Venafro, Duke of Sarno and Miranda. Giuseppe de' Medici was assigned to the court of the queen of Italy.

Italian nobility
Preceded by Michele de' Medici, 9th Prince of Ottajano	Prince of Ottajano	Succeeded by Angelica de' Medici, 11th Princess of Ottajano
