= Giuseppe de' Medici, 8th Prince of Ottajano =

Italian noble and Sicilian politician from Naples

Giuseppe de 'Medici of Ottajano, Prince of Ottajano (21 January 1803 – 1 January 1874) was an Italian noble and Sicilian politician from Naples.

== Biography ==
A member of a cadet branch of the Medici family, called the Princes of Ottajano, he also possessed the titles of Prince of Venafro, Duke of Sarno. Giuseppe de' Medici was also General Superintendent of Public Health of the Kingdom of the Two Sicilies. He married Donna Anna Maria Gaetani dell’Aquila d’Aragona (1802-1850) in 14 August 1822. She possessed the title of 6th Duchess of Miranda on her own right and passed the title to their descendants. They had three children, Michele, who inherited his parents titles, Isabella (1831-1879) and Luigi (1830-1842) who died at age 12 in San Giorgio a Cremano.

Italian nobility
| Preceded by Michele de' Medici, 7th Prince of Ottajano | Prince of Ottajano | Succeeded by Michele de' Medici, 9th prince of Ottajano |
