= Michele de' Medici di Ottajano =

Italian politician

Michele de 'Medici of Ottajano, Prince of Ottajano (11 May 1823 in Naples – 2 February 1882 in Naples) was an Italian noble and politician.

A member of a cadet branch of the Medici family, called the Princes of Ottajano, he also possessed the titles of Prince of Venafro, Duke of Sarno and Miranda, Michele de 'Medici di Ottajano was appointed senator of the Kingdom of Italy 28 February 1876.

On the occasion of his wedding with Giulia Marulli, with whom he then had four children, he renovated the Medici palace of Ottaviano, a monumental building in Naples.

Italian nobility
Preceded by Giuseppe de' Medici, 8th Prince of Ottajano	Prince of Ottajano	Succeeded by Giuseppe de' Medici, 10th Prince of Ottaiano
