= Raymond de Roover =

Raymond Adrien Marie de Roover (August 28, 1904 – March 18, 1972) was an economic historian of medieval Europe, whose scholarship explained why Scholastic economic thought is best understood as a precursor of, and wholly compatible with, classical economic thought. In contrast, many mid-20th-century economic historians, such as R.H. Tawney, taught that Karl Marx was the last and greatest of the Scholastic economists.

== Life ==
De Roover was born in Antwerp on 28 August 1904. He studied commercial and financial science at the Higher Institute of Commerce Saint-Ignace (the origin of the University of Antwerp) and began working as a bookkeeper while spending his free time studying the history of bookkeeping. In 1928 he published a study of Jan Ympijn, who had written the first Flemish treatise on double-entry bookkeeping (published 1543). In 1929 he came across the accounts of the exchange merchants Colaert van Marke and Willem Ruweel in Bruges city archives, their records having been sequestered by the city at their bankruptcy in 1369. This led to a number of publications, including a 1937 article in Annales d'histoire économique et sociale.

In 1936 De Roover married the American historian Florence Edler, and emigrated to the United States. He studied for a Master of Business Administration at Harvard Business School, graduating in 1938, and in 1943 obtained a doctorate in economics from the University of Chicago. In 1940 he was naturalised as a US citizen. His early research had focused on the technicalities of banking and exchange in medieval Flanders. In the United States, he expanded his research to the history of the Medici Bank and to more abstract medieval economic thought.

After graduating from Chicago, De Roover taught in turn at Wells College, Illinois University, University of California, Berkeley, and Boston College, before his 1961 appointment at Brooklyn College of the City University of New York. He was also a visiting lecturer at various European universities. and in 1949 a Guggenheim Fellow. He became a fellow of the Koninklijke Academie van België and of the Mediaeval Academy of America. He died in Brooklyn on 18 March 1972.

De Roover and his wife appear as minor characters in The Sinking of the Odradek Stadium, a novel by the American novelist Harry Mathews that is in part concerned with the Medici.

== Publications ==
- (1930). "Quelques considérations sur les livres de compte de Collard de Marke (1366-1369)", Bulletin de l'Institut supérieur de Commerce Saint-Ignace, 7, pages 445–475
- (1934). "Le livre de comptes de Guillaume Ruyelle, changeur à Bruges (1369)", Annales de la Société d'Emulation de Bruges, 77, pages 5-95.
- (1937). "Aux origines d'une technique intellectuelle: la formation et l'expansion de la comptabilité à partie double", Annales d'histoire économique et sociale 9, pages 171–193, 270–298.
- (1948). Money, Banking and Credit in Medieval Bruges. Cambridge: Mediaeval Academy of America. Routledge, 2000.
- (1948). The Medici Bank: its Organization, Management, Operations and Decline. New York University Press.
- (1949). Gresham on Foreign Exchange; an Essay on Early English Mercantilism. Cambridge: Harvard University Press.
- (1953). L'Évolution de la Lettre de Change: XIVe-XVIIIe Siècles. Paris: Armand Colin.
- (1958). "The Concept of the Just Price: Theory and Economic Policy", The Journal of Economic History 18 (4), pages 418–434.
- (1963). The Rise and Decline of the Medici Bank, 1397–1494. Harvard University Press; W.W. Norton, 1966; Beard Books (August 1999), ISBN 1-59740-373-3
- (1968). The Bruges Money Market around 1400, with a statistical supplement by Hyman Sardy. Brussels: KVAB.
- (1971). La Pensée Économique des Scolastiques: Doctrines et Méthodes. Montréal: Institut d'Études Médiévales.
- (1974). Business, Banking, and Economic Thought in Late Medieval and Early Modern Europe. Selected Studies of Raymond de Roover. University of Chicago Press.
