= Francesco Sassetti =

Italian banker

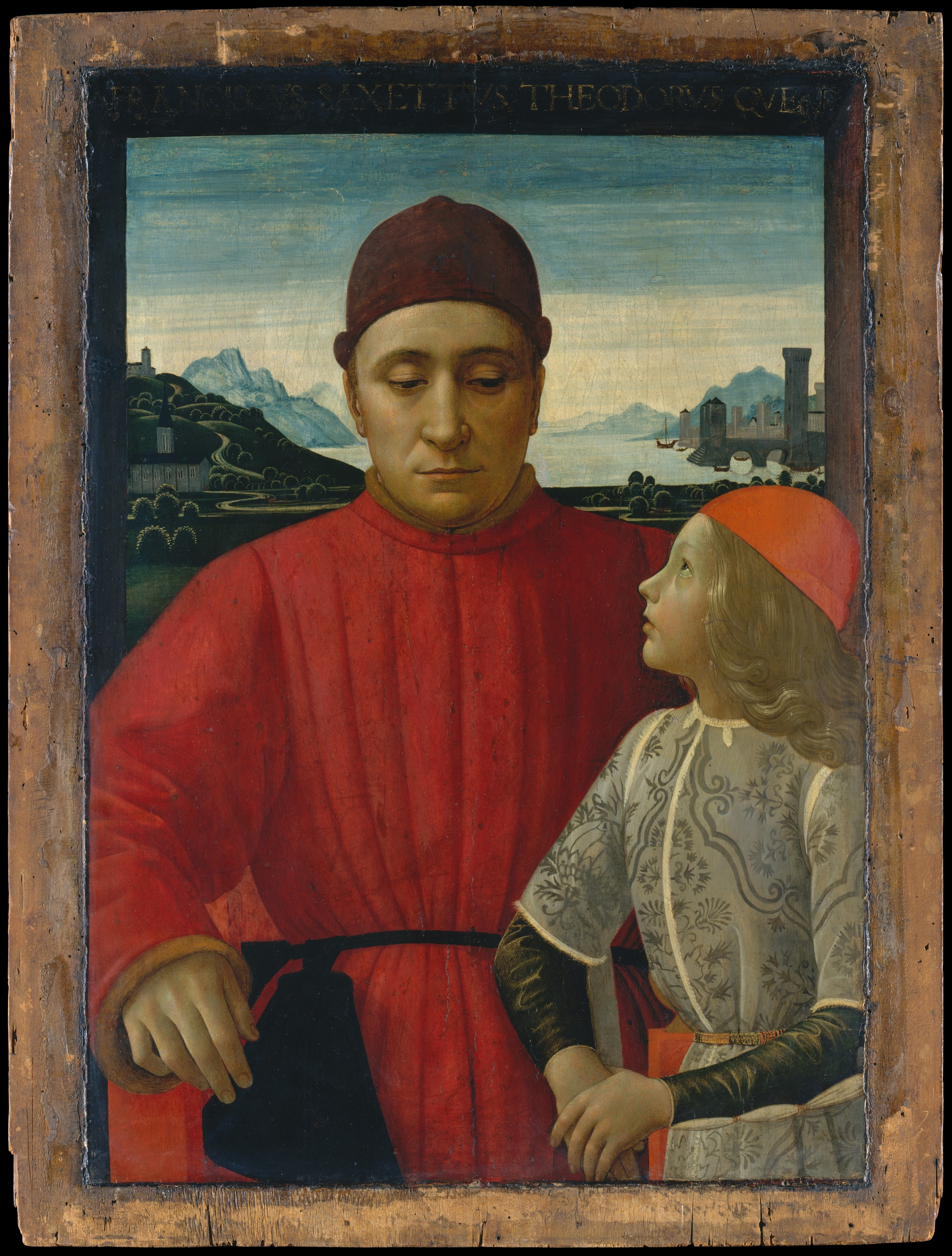
- Portrait of Francesco Sassetti and his son Teodoro (c. 1488) by Domenico Ghirlandaio, Metropolitan Museum of Art, New York
- Born: April 9, 1421
- Died: March 9, 1490 (aged 69)
- Occupation: Banker
- Predecessor: Giovanni Tornabuoni
- Spouse: Nera Corsi (m. 1458)
- Father: Tommaso Sassetti

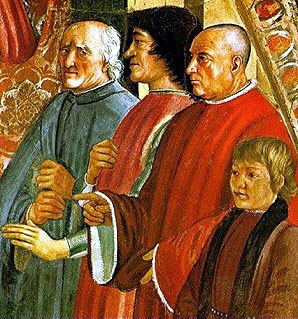
A detail from a fresco in the Sassetti Chapel, Santa Trinita, Florence. Sassetti is the second from right.

Francesco Sassetti (9 March 1421 – April 1490) was an Italian banker.

== Biography ==
Born in Florence, the youngest son of Tommaso Sassetti. He is first recorded as joining the famous Medici bank in either 1438 or 1439 (at seventeen or eighteen years of age) as a factor to the Avignon branch, employed by Cosimo de' Medici. His rise was remarkably quick, and he became a junior partner in that branch, and then its general manager, investing his own money in the branch and receiving a share of the profits. By 1453, he had been transferred to the Geneva branch (which as before, he invested in—though he maintained his investment in the Avignon branch), and in 1458 had returned home to Florence to a position as an adviser to Piero and Lorenzo de' Medici (who had succeeded Cosimo); he also married. Some time after this, he was raised to the highest position in the Medici bank available to non-Medici: "General manager" (and was referred to by Lorenzo as nostro ministro).

Among other things, Sassetti is vital to studies of the Medici bank because of some surviving documents kept by him: his "secret account book" or libro segreto, is a private set of account books that Sassetti meticulously kept between 1462 and 1472. They are invaluable for their full and honest statements of Sassetti's finances and for the light they shed on the internal workings of the bank when he was the general manager. They also are interesting in showing how Sassetti made liberal use of interest-bearing deposits and reinvested his earnings from the Medici branches in other enterprises.

Sassetti is often figured in the ultimate decline of the Medici bank. An early sign of the decline was the near-failure of the Lyon branch because of its manager's venality, which Sassetti saved—but as general manager, he should have been suspicious of the high profits the branch manager responsible (Lionetto de' Rossi) reported and checked the books before events had come to such a pass, especially since he was a partner in that branch, even if he was not in the others.

It was his duty to control the local managers, to audit their accounts, and to lay down the rules which they were expected to follow...Careless managers were reprimanded and summoned to Florence to report. Sassetti, it seems, changed this policy and gave much more leeway to the managers of the affiliated companies.

Sassetti is even more culpable in the failure of the Bruges branch. He consistently overruled Angelo Tani, who opposed the branch manager Tommaso Portinari's reckless schemes, and even removed the last checks against Portinari lending excessive amounts to secular rulers, which would be a direct cause of the failure of the Bruges branch. It failed so spectacularly that the long-term viability of the Medici branch was damaged.

De Roover detects in the accounting methods of the libro segreto a growing distraction by Sassetti, who was increasingly interested in secular humanist activities. De Roover's view must be set against the humanist activity of Sassetti throughout the 1460s. In 1460 he acquired and restored Villa La Pietra.

In 1478 he purchased rights to a funerary chapel in the basilica of Santa Trinita. Work on the Sassetti Chapel was undertaken by Domenico Ghirlandaio between 1483 and 1485. It features a fresco cycle, dedicated to Sassetti's namesake, St Francis, as well as portraits of his family and images of contemporary Florence and an altarpiece on the theme Adoration of the Shepherds.

== Bibliography ==
- de Roover, Florence Edler (October 1943). "Francesco Sassetti and the Downfall of the Medici Banking House". Bulletin of the Business Historical Society. 17 (4). The President and Fellows of Harvard College: 65–80. doi:10.2307/3111278. JSTOR 3111278.
