= Sassetti Chapel =

Chapel in Santa Trinita, Florence

Coordinates: 43°46′13″N 11°15′03″E

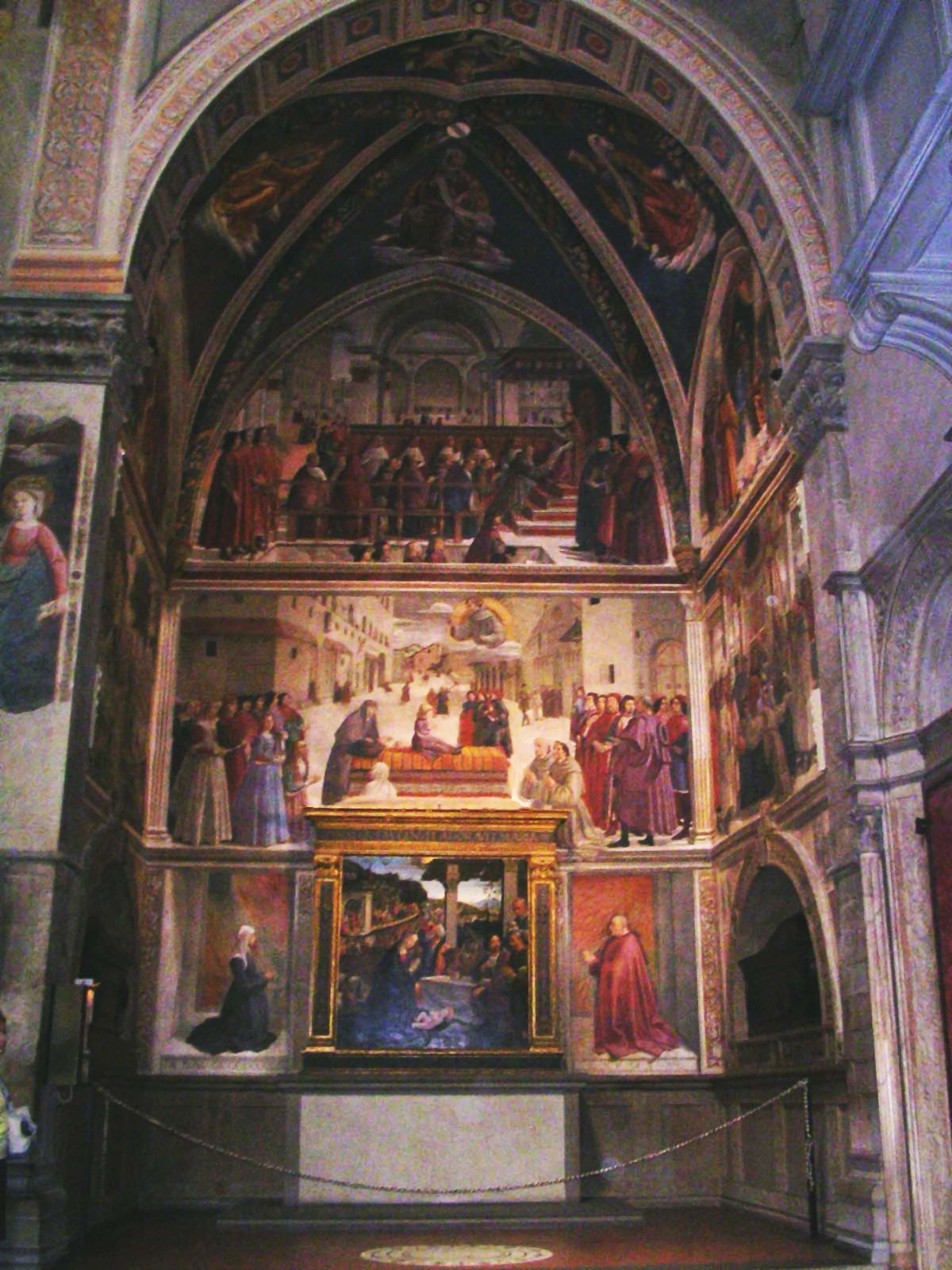
Overview of the Chapel

The Sassetti Chapel (Italian: Cappella Sassetti) is a chapel in the basilica of Santa Trinita in Florence, Italy. It is especially notable for its frescoes of the Stories of St. Francis, considered Domenico Ghirlandaio's masterwork.

== History ==
Francesco Sassetti (1421–1490) was a rich banker and a member of the Medici entourage, for which he directed the Medici Bank. In 1478 he acquired the chapel of St. Francis in Santa Trinita, after his proposal to add a decoration portraying the saint had been rejected by the Dominicans of Santa Maria Novella, where his family had had a chapel (later also frescoed by Ghirlandaio, and now known as the Tornabuoni Chapel) since the 14th century.

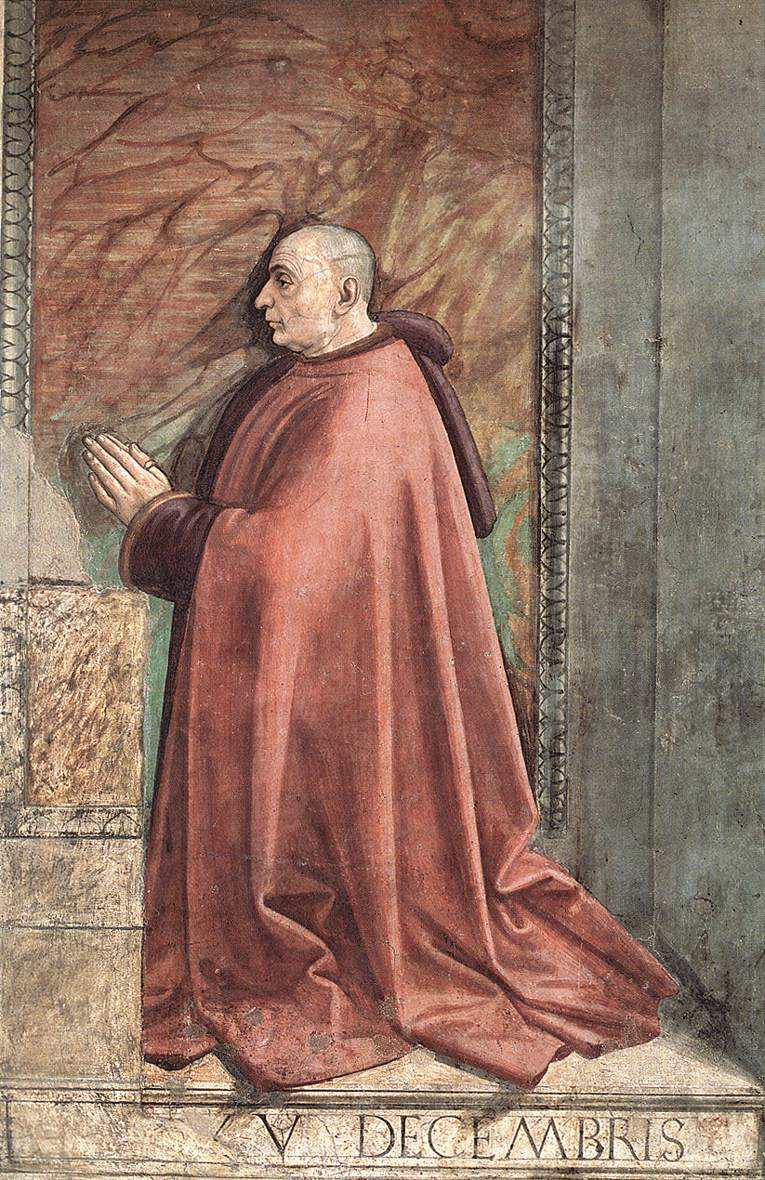
Donor portrait of Francesco Sassetti

He commissioned the execution of the frescoes from the most famed artist of the city, Domenico Ghirlandaio. The date of the contract is that signed next to the portraits of Sassetti and his wife (December 25, 1480), although the work was not carried out until between 1483 and 1486. The central altarpiece, depicting the Adoration of the Shepherds, is dated 1485.

Ghirlandaio portrayed numerous figures of contemporary Florentine society in the scenes. All the work shows the importance of the influence of the Flemish school on Ghirlandaio, in particular the Portinari Triptych by Hugo van der Goes, taken by him to Florence in 1483 and now in the Uffizi.

The Sassetti Chapel was restored in 2004.

== Structure ==
The chapel, like the church in which it is located, is in Gothic style, characterized by an ogival arch.

The fresco cycle covers three walls framed by trompe-l'œil architectural elements. The altarpiece is also framed by a painted marble decoration. The two side walls house the tombs of Francesco Sassetti and his wife Nera Corsi, under a gilded arch, a creation of Giuliano da Sangallo. At the side of the altar are kneeling portraits of the two patrons, Nera Corsi on the left and Sassetti on the right: they direct their prayers towards the central altarpiece of the Adoration of the Shepherds, also by Ghirlandaio.

Ghirlandaio's frescoes can also be seen in the upper transept wall, outside the chapel. This area was plastered in the 18th century, the paintings being rediscovered only in 1895, which accounts for their poorer state of conservation. The work outside the Sassetti chapel is attributed to the three Ghirlandaio brothers (Domenico, David and Benedetto) and assistants. Its perspective was devised to offer a perfect view from below.

The first scene painted above the chapel is the Tiburtine Sibyl Announces Jesus' Coming to Augustus. The Sibyl is probably a portrait of Sassetti's daughter, Sibilla. On the pilaster dividing the Sassetti Chapel from the subsequent one is a painted grisaille statue of David. In the vault of the chapel are the four Sibyls, surrounded by flaming aureoles and holding out banderoles describing their prophetic role as assigned them by Virgil:

Hec teste Virgil Magnus, in ultima autem etate;
Invisibile verbum palapabitur germinabit.

Only the faces of the Sibyls are attributed to Ghirlandaio; the bodies were probably executed by his workshop.

== The Stories of St. Francis ==
The fresco cycle extends over three walls of the chapels, and includes six scenes:

- Renunciation of Worldly Goods
- The Confirmation of the Franciscan Rule
- The Test of Fire
- The Miracle of the Stigmata
- Death of St. Francis
- The Resurrection of the Boy

Ghirlandaio had possibly never seen the Stories of St. Francis in the Basilica di San Francesco in Assisi, but he must certainly have known those in the Bardi Chapel of Santa Croce in Florence, painted by Giotto in the early 14th century.

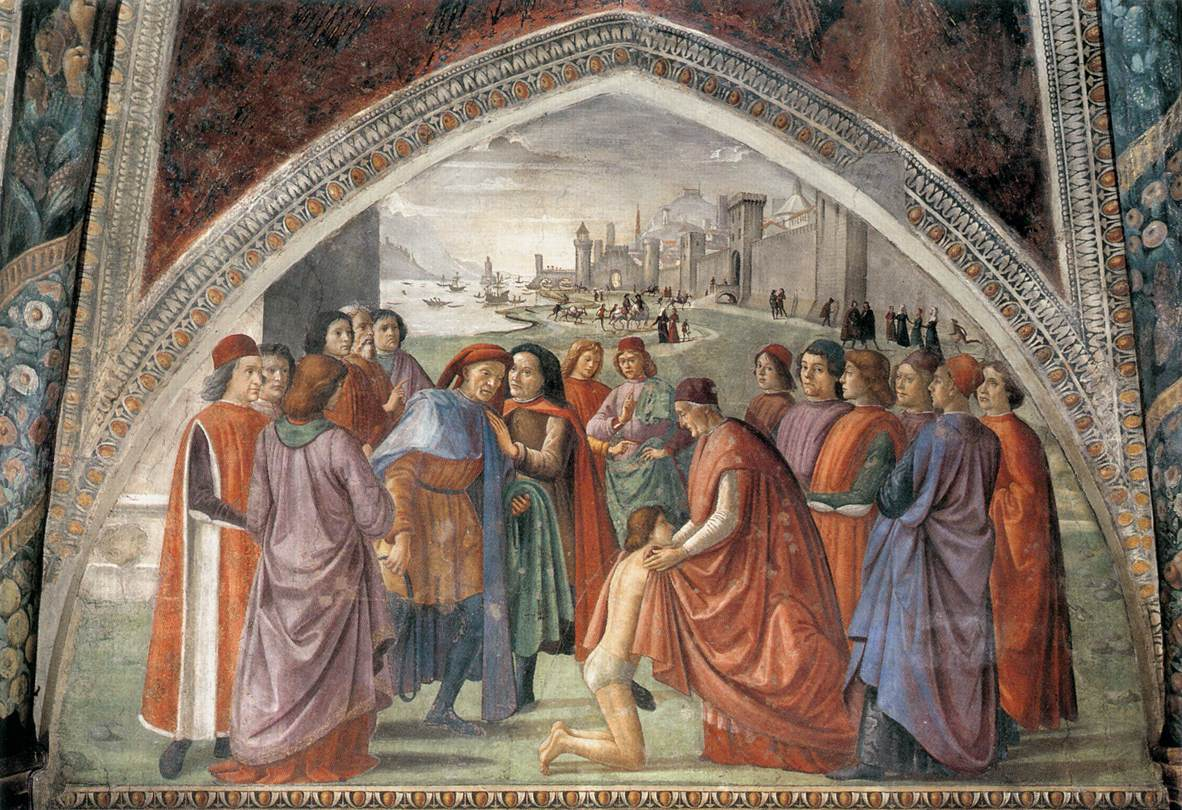
The Renunciation of the Worldly Goods

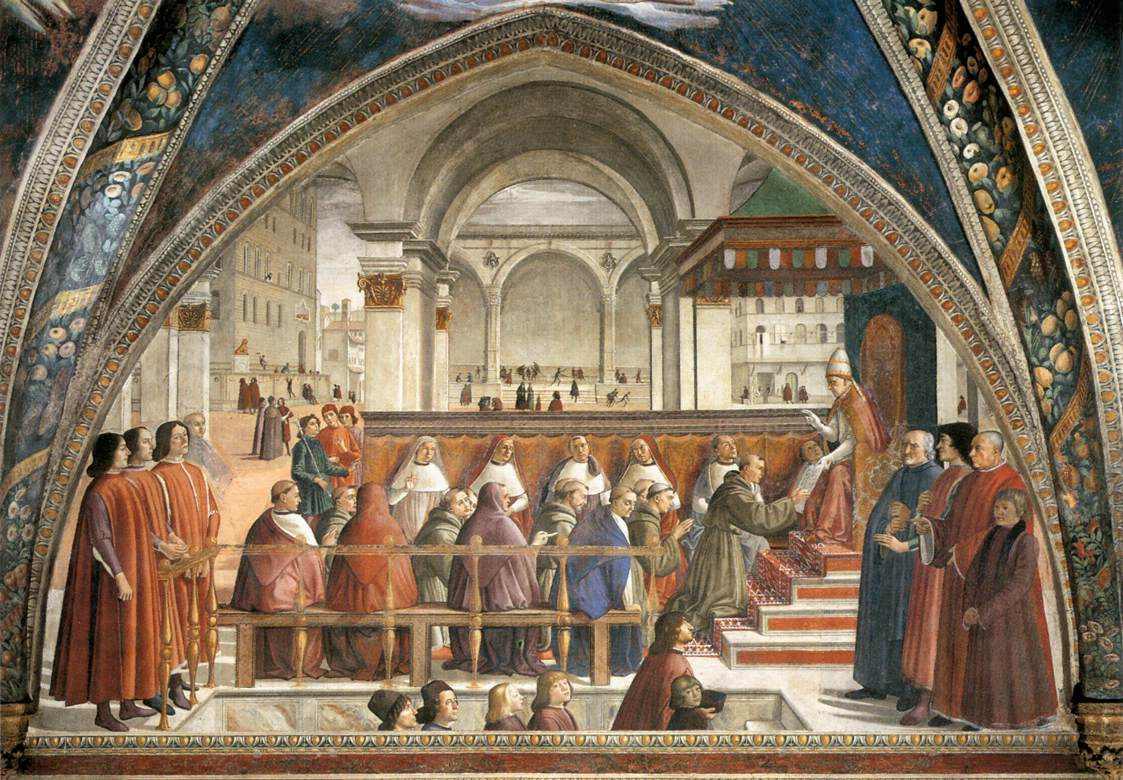
The Confirmation of the Franciscan Rule

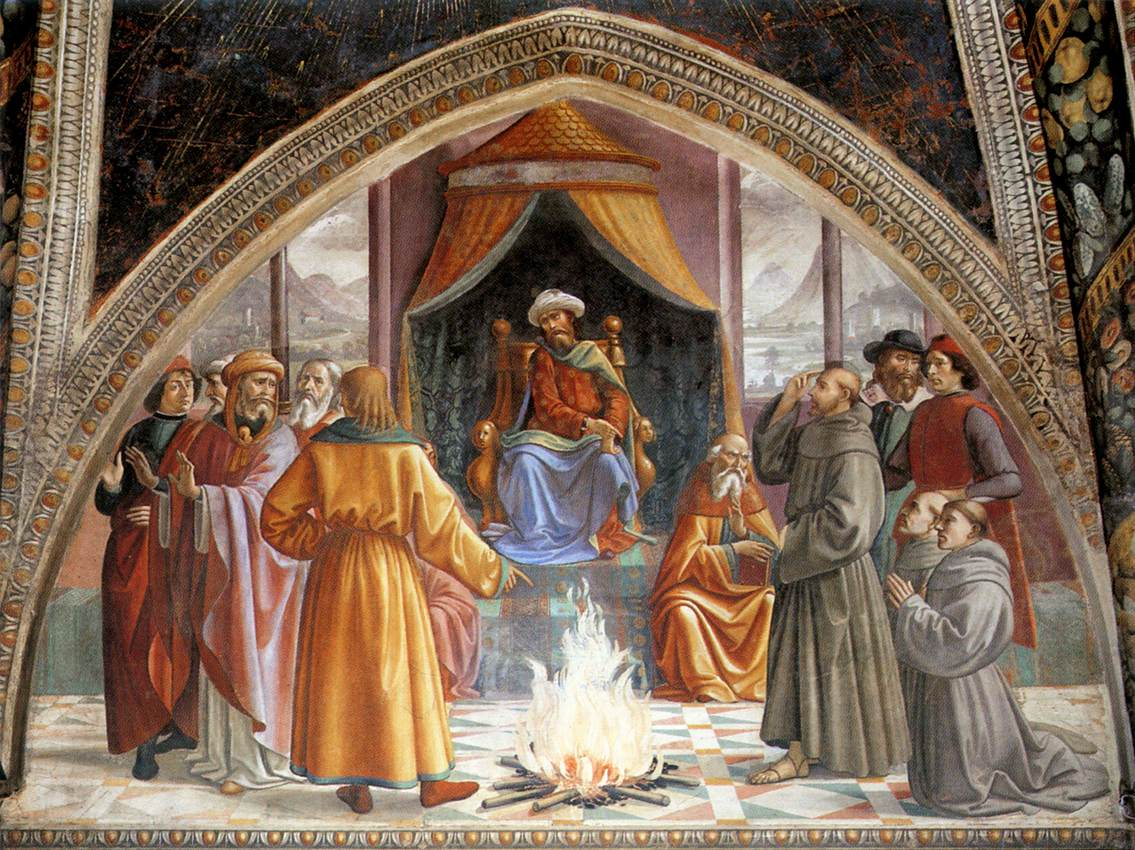
The Test of Fire

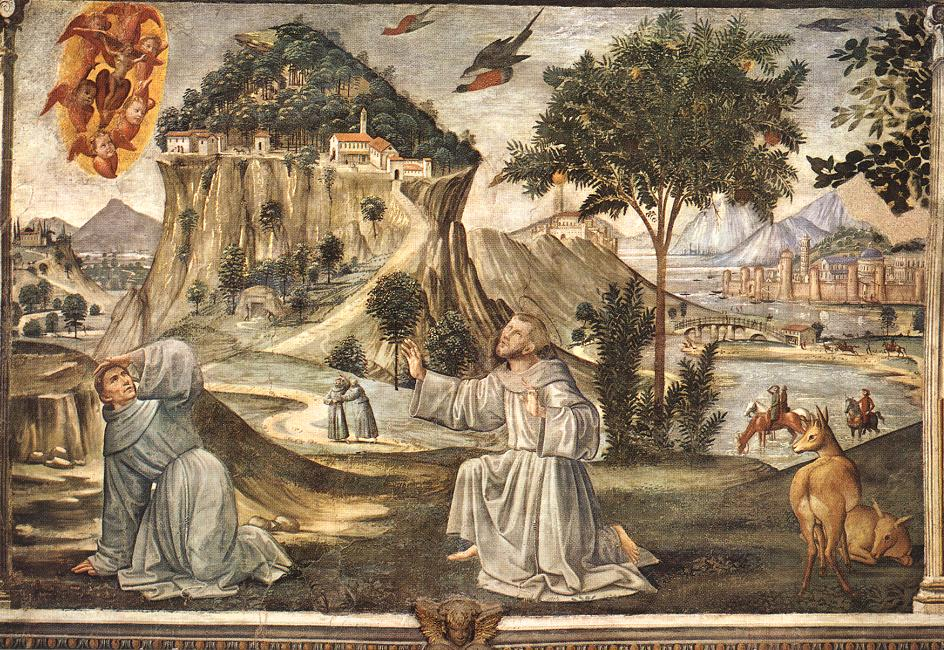
The Stigmata of St. Francis

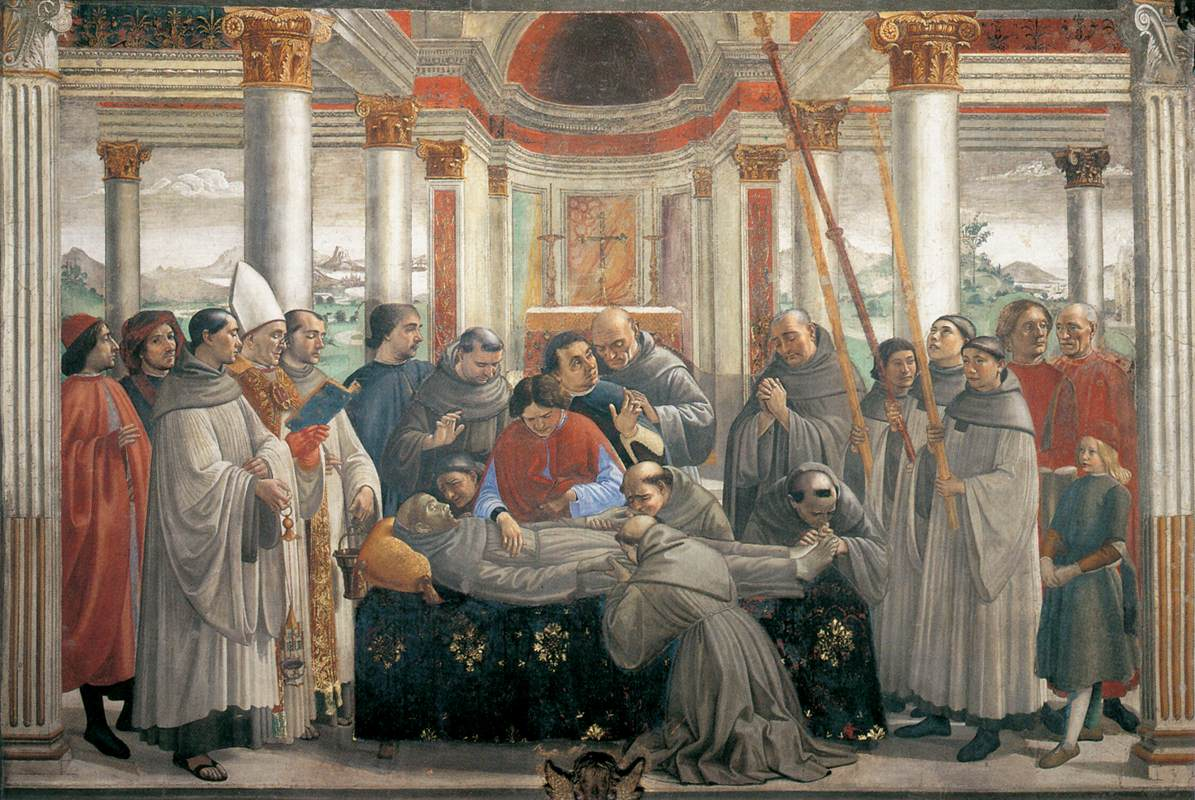
The Death of St. Francis

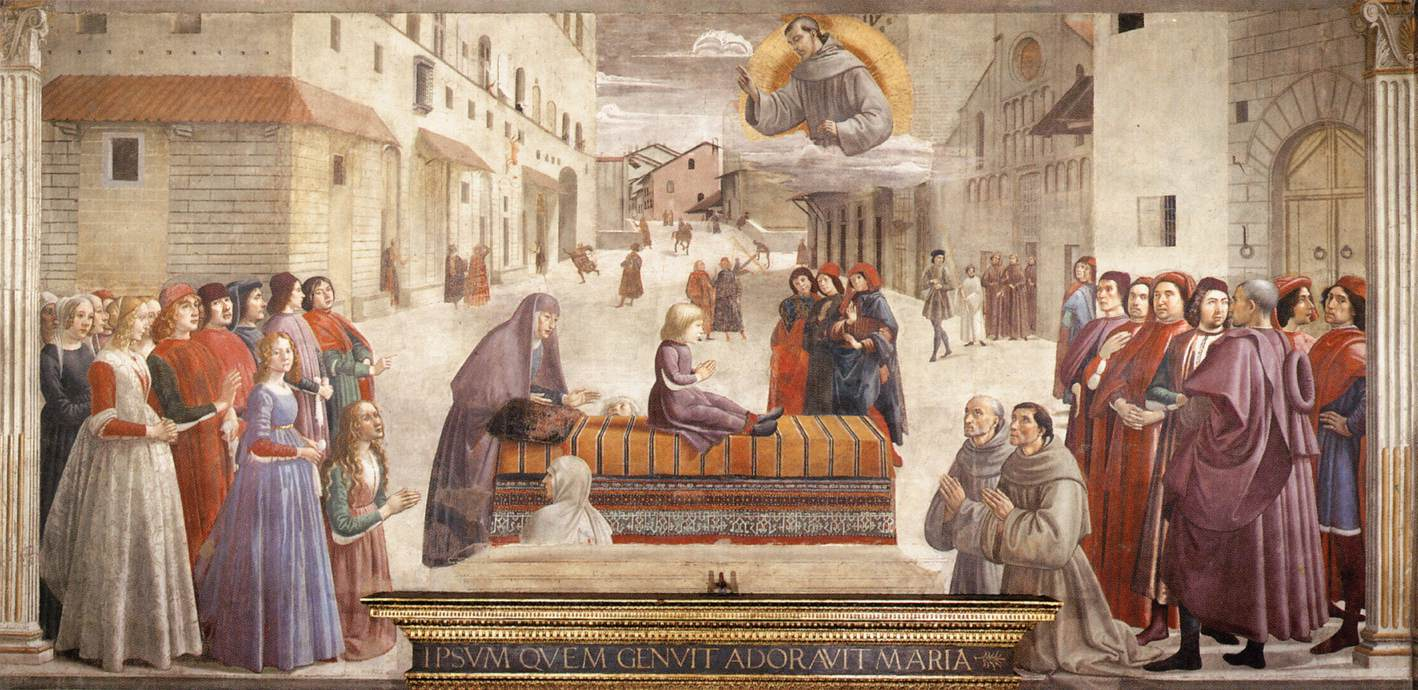
The Resurrection of the Boy

=== Renunciation of Worldly Goods ===
This scene is located on the upper left wall, and portrays the young Francis who having renounced all his assets by removing his clothes publicly, is protected by the bishop of Perugia. Francis' raging father is shown with some people restraining him. The scene is set in a northern European city which had been identified as Geneva or Lyon, where Sassetti had served for the Medici. The secondary figures could be work by Domenico's brothers and workshop.

=== The Confirmation of the Rule ===
This scene, in the upper central wall, depicts St. Francis being received by Pope Innocent III in 1209 at the Cathedral of Sant Giovanni in Laterano at the time of the Franciscan Order's sanction by the Pope. The figures are portrayed in a cathedral interior, so that the chapel's arch resembles the triumphal arch of the church. The scene is set in Florence instead of Rome, the background showing the Piazza della Signoria, the Palazzo Vecchio and the Loggia dei Lanzi, which did not at that time contain statues). The choice of the city was an allusion to the power and status that Florence had assumed; in Humanist circles it was considered a new Rome or Jerusalem.

A drawing, now in Berlin, shows that initially Ghirlandaio had intended a more traditional iconography following that of the frescoes in Santa Croce and without the portraits. Later he modified it, dividing the pictorial space into three planes: the steps, the church and the background. On the right, in the foreground, are Sassetti's brother-in-law, the Gonfaloniere di Giustizia Antonio di Puccio Pucci; Sassetti's employer, Lorenzo de' Medici; Francesco Sassetti himself and his son Federico. Lorenzo raises his hand to greet Angelo Poliziano, the tutor of his sons who are featured ascending the stairs. They are Giuliano, Piero and Giovanni, the future Pope Leo X, followed by other members of the Humanist Academy, Luigi Pulci and Matteo Franco. Sassetti is pointing out his older sons on the other side of the stairs: Galeazzo, Teodoro and Cosimo.

This painting, which is considered one of Ghirlandaio's masterpieces, provides the most reliable portraits of these various 15th century people, as, unlike the work of Botticelli, who also painted members of the Medici household, they are neither stylised, nor do they appear to be idealised.

=== The Test of Fire ===
This scene is located on the upper right wall. It portrays St. Francis preaching to the Ayyubid sultan Al-Kamil, who asked him to walk over a fire to demonstrate his sanctity. The piece is rather similar to that of Giotto in Santa Croce with the sultan in the middle, St. Francis on the right with his brother friars, but with Ghirlandaio's innovation of a figure in the foreground whose back is to the observer. It is one of the best executed parts of the cycle.

=== The Miracle of the Stigmata ===
The lower left wall represents St. Francis kneeling, with open arms, receiving the divine sign from an apparition of the crucified Christ supported by a group of cherubim. The fresco was executed in ten days. Although featuring similar iconography to Giotto's work in Santa Croce, it is more likely that Ghirlandaio was inspired by the marble relief of Benedetto da Maiano's pulpit, also in Santa Croce. The miracle portrayed occurred at La Verna, the castles of which can be seen in the background which is characterized by a naturalistic rendering of outstanding quality, including a well executed deer. On the right can be seen a city on a lake, a fanciful representation of Pisa with its Duomo and Leaning Tower.

=== The Death of St. Francis ===
The last scene of the cycle is on the lower right wall and was executed in 28 days. It shows the dead saint lying on a catafalque in the middle of a large Renaissance church, surrounded by numerous figures. That the composition is derived from Giotto's work in Santa Croce is clearly seen in various elements including the monks' gestures, though Ghirlandaio added different details such as the monumental background and the varying responses of the different figures.

The three people on the right, a father with his son and nephew, are probably connected to the Sassetti family. On the right the tutor Poliziano is again portrayed alongside Bartolomeo Fonzio.

=== The Resurrection of the Boy ===
This scene portrays a posthumous miracle by St. Francis, connected to the Sassetti family and for this reason located in a central position of the chapel, although out of chronological order with the death of St Francis. It portrays the resurrection of a boy who had died falling from Palazzo Spini Feroni, a palace on the piazza facing Santa Trinita. According to some authorities, Ghirlandaio was inspired by Masaccio's The Tribute Money in the Brancacci Chapel.

The resurrected boy is in the middle of the composition, sitting with his hands together on a bed covered with Eastern-style drapes. St. Francis, appearing as an apparition, blesses him from the sky, while, on either side, a group of people attend the scene. Among the people portrayed are numerous figures from contemporary Florence. The five women on the left are probably Sassetti's daughters, their husbands or fiancées being visible on the right in the foreground. The last man in the first right row is Ghirlandaio himself. Also notable is the presence of a Moorish female servant. Other figures portrayed on the right include Maso degli Albizzi, Angelo Acciaioli, Palla Strozzi and Neri di Gino Capponi. The last two people on the right are probably Poliziano and Fonzio.

The scene is also important as it shows in detail the appearance of the Santa Trinita's piazza in the 15th century, with the old Romanesque façade of the church, Palazzo Spini Feroni still with the appearance of a fortress and an undecorated Ponte Santa Trinita. The three figures behind the bier are attributed to assistants.

== The altarpiece ==
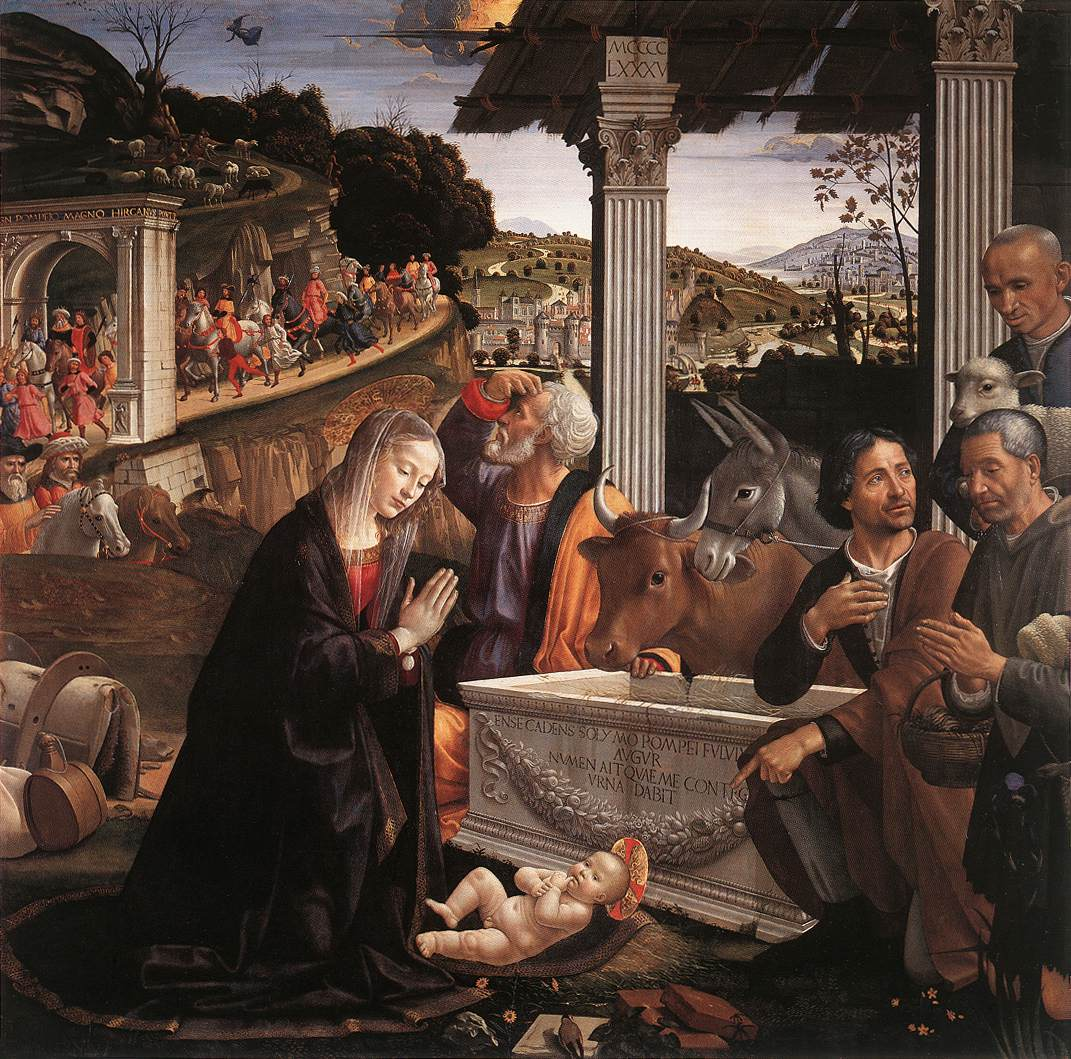
The Adoration of the Shepherds

The Adoration of the Shepherds was painted in 1485. It is recognized as one of Ghirlandaio's masterpieces, as well as one of the Florentine painting school. The work shows clear influences of the Flemish school, the artist having studied Hugo van der Goes' Portinari Altarpiece, which had been taken to Florence in 1483 by the Portinari family for the church of Sant'Egidio. Ghirlandaio's inspiration from that work is shown by positioning and realist handling of the three shepherds on the right, one of which is the artist's self-portrait. The frame has the inscription "Ipsum quem genuit adoravit Maria" ("Maria worshiped the one whom she bore").

Also influenced by Flemish painting is the attention to detail: every object has a precise symbolic role; and the well-rendered airy perspective, with the landscape fading towards a detailed representation of a hill and a town. The farthest city, on the right, is a symbolic Jerusalem with the domed edifice; in front of it is a dead tree, a reference to its conquest. The left city represents Rome, with the two sepulchres of the "prophetic" emperors, Augustus and Hadrian (who, at the time, was thought to be buried under the Torre delle Milizie). In the city, however, a church resembling Santa Maria del Fiore can be seen, a hint of the role of Florence as a new Rome.

The altarpiece is flanked by the two kneeling portraits of the donors.

The scene is set on a flowering lawn, with Mary to the left foreground, kneeling in front of the Child. The manger, before which the Child lies, is an ancient Roman sarcophagus with the inscription "Ense cadens soly mo Pompei Fulvi[us] augur Numen aitquae me conteg[it] urna dabit", an allusion of the coming of Christ through the prophecy of Fulvius, killed by Pompey the Great during the Roman conquest of Jerusalem. The prophecy said that from the sarcophagus housing his remains a God will rise, a reference to the victory of Christianity over Paganism.

Next to Mary is Saint Joseph looking upwards as, in the background, an angel is announcing to the shepherds the coming of Christ, while on the left, the long procession of the Magi is passing under a triumphal arch. The arch has the inscription: "Gn[eo] Pompeo Magno Hircanus Pont[ifex] P[osuit]" ("The priest Hircanus erected [this arch] in honor of Gnaius Pompey the Great"). On the left, the two nearest Magi are staring at a light visible from above the hut's roof, coming perhaps from the star. Behind the sarcophagus are an ox and a donkey, symbols of the Jews and the Gentiles.

The three rocks in the very foreground are a hint to the Sassetti, whose name in Italian means "Small rocks". Perched on one of them is a goldfinch, symbol of Christ's Passion and resurrection.
