= Nera Corsi =

Italian noble woman (1444–1507)

- Nera di Piero Corsi
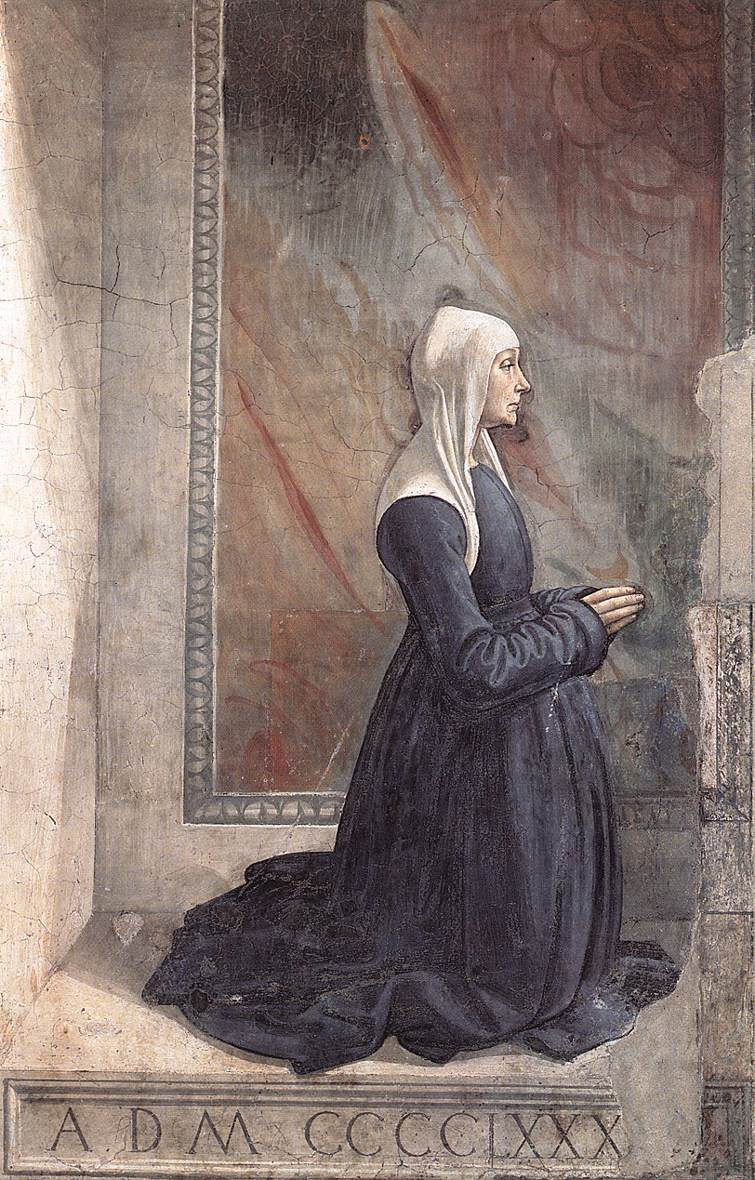
- Nera Corsi by Domenico Ghirlandaio
- Born: 1444; Florence, Italy
- Died: 1507 (aged 62–63); Florence, Italy
- Spouse: Francesco Sassetti
- Issue: Violante Margherita Sassetti (b. 1462); Teodoro Sassetti (b. 1479); Other Children
- House: Corsi
- Father: Piero di Domenico
- Religion: Catholic

Nera Corsi (Florence, 1444 - Florence, 1507) was an Italian noble woman of the dynasty Corsi and Francesco Sassetti's wife. Her tomb, located in the Sassetti Chapel of Santa Trinita in Florence, is the only female tomb in Florence for a married woman in the 15th century.

== Life ==
Nera was born in 1444 in the city of Florence to Piero di Domenico Corsi, from the branch of Domenico, a powerful banker.

In 1458, at the age of 15, she married the banker Francesco Sassetti, one of the most influential and wealthy in the city of Florence.

She was the mother, among other children, of Violanta Margherita, who married Neri Capponi, and Teodoro Sassetti.

In 1478, her husband Francesco Sassetti purchased rights to a funerary chapel in the basilica of Santa Trinita. Work on the Sassetti Chapel was undertaken by Domenico Ghirlandaio between 1483 and 1485. It features a fresco cycle, dedicated to Sassetti's namesake, St Francis, as well as portraits of his family and images of contemporary Florence and an altarpiece on the theme Adoration of the Shepherds. Francesco died in 1490 and Nera shortly thereafter, in 1507. She was buried in the tomb that had been built for her years before by Giuliano da Sangallo, which was unusual for the customs of the time since women did not usually have tombs or chapels dedicated in their honor. After that, Nera's tomb was the only woman's tomb not only in Florence but in whole of Italy from the 15th century, becoming a historical and cultural landmark.

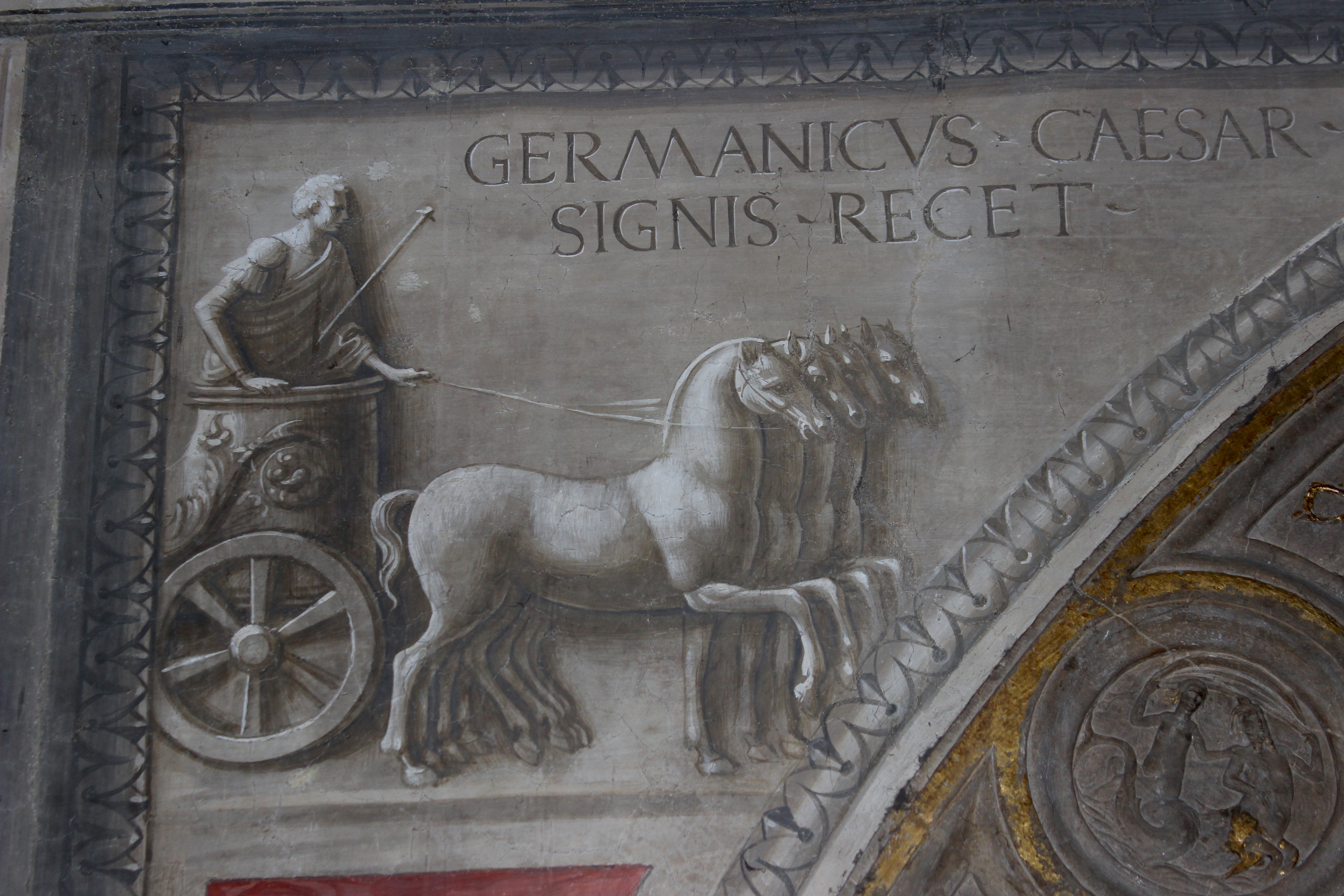

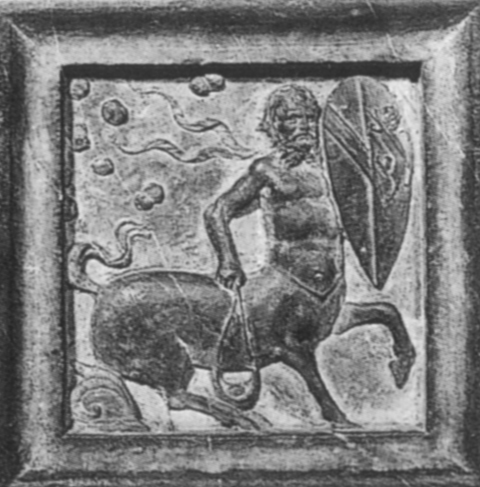

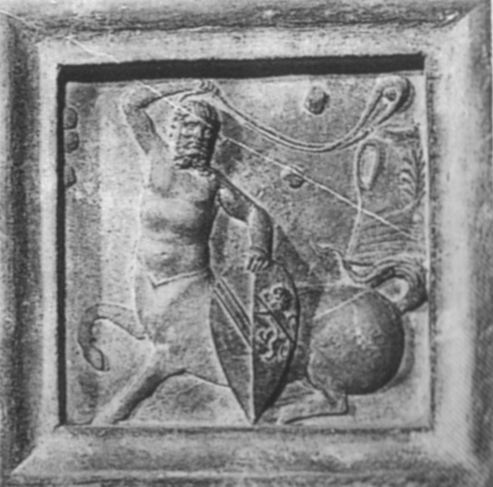

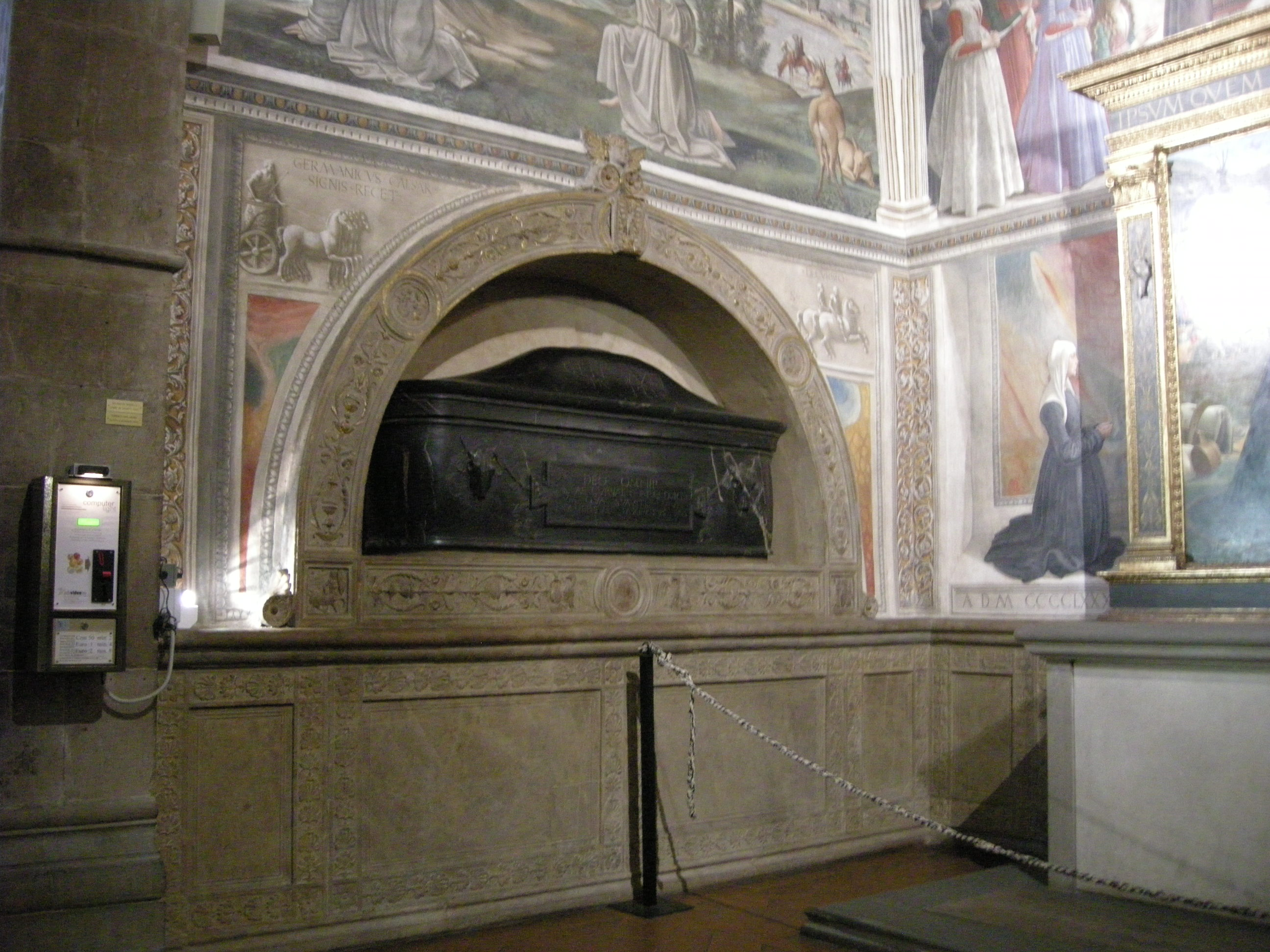

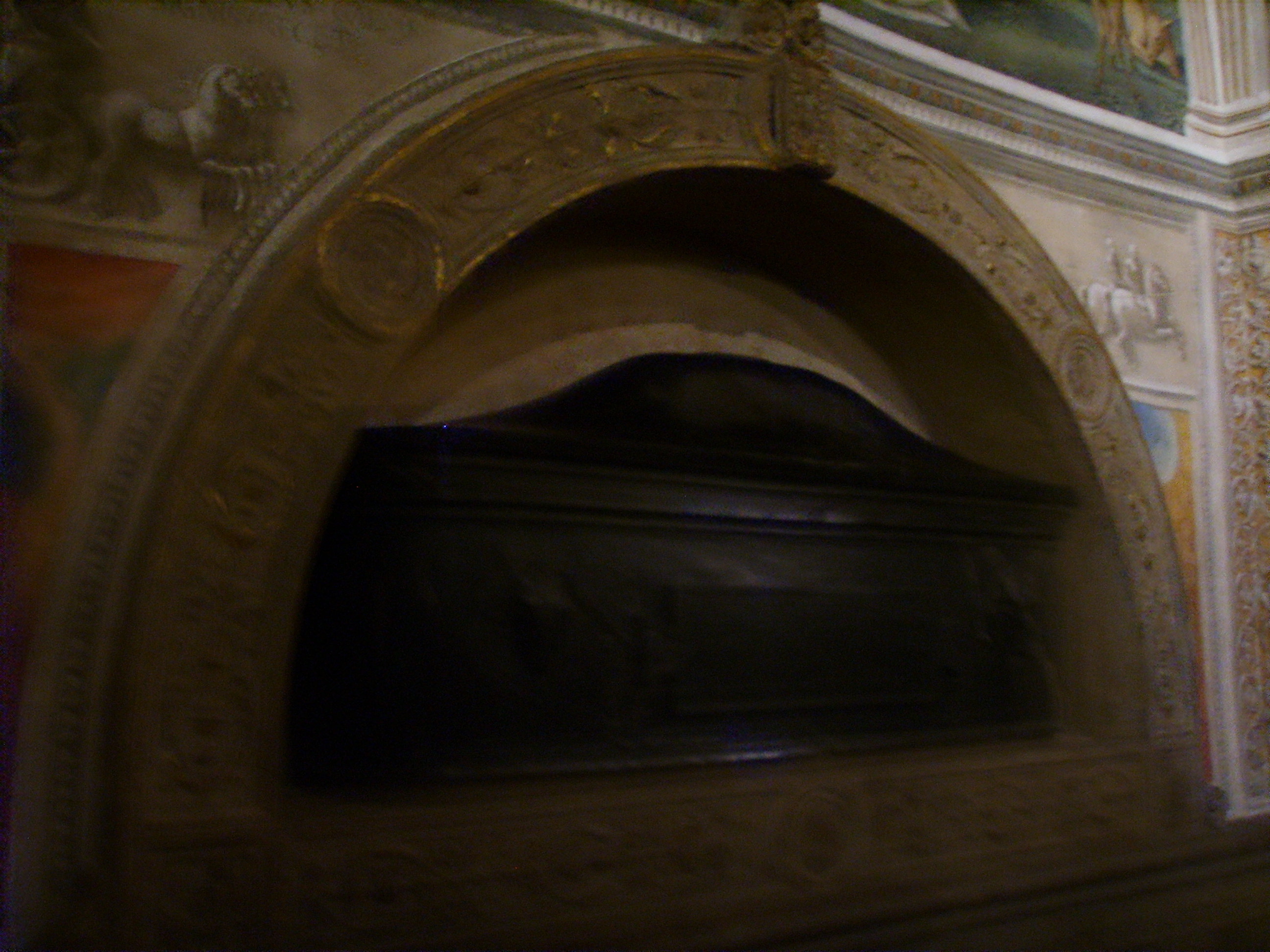

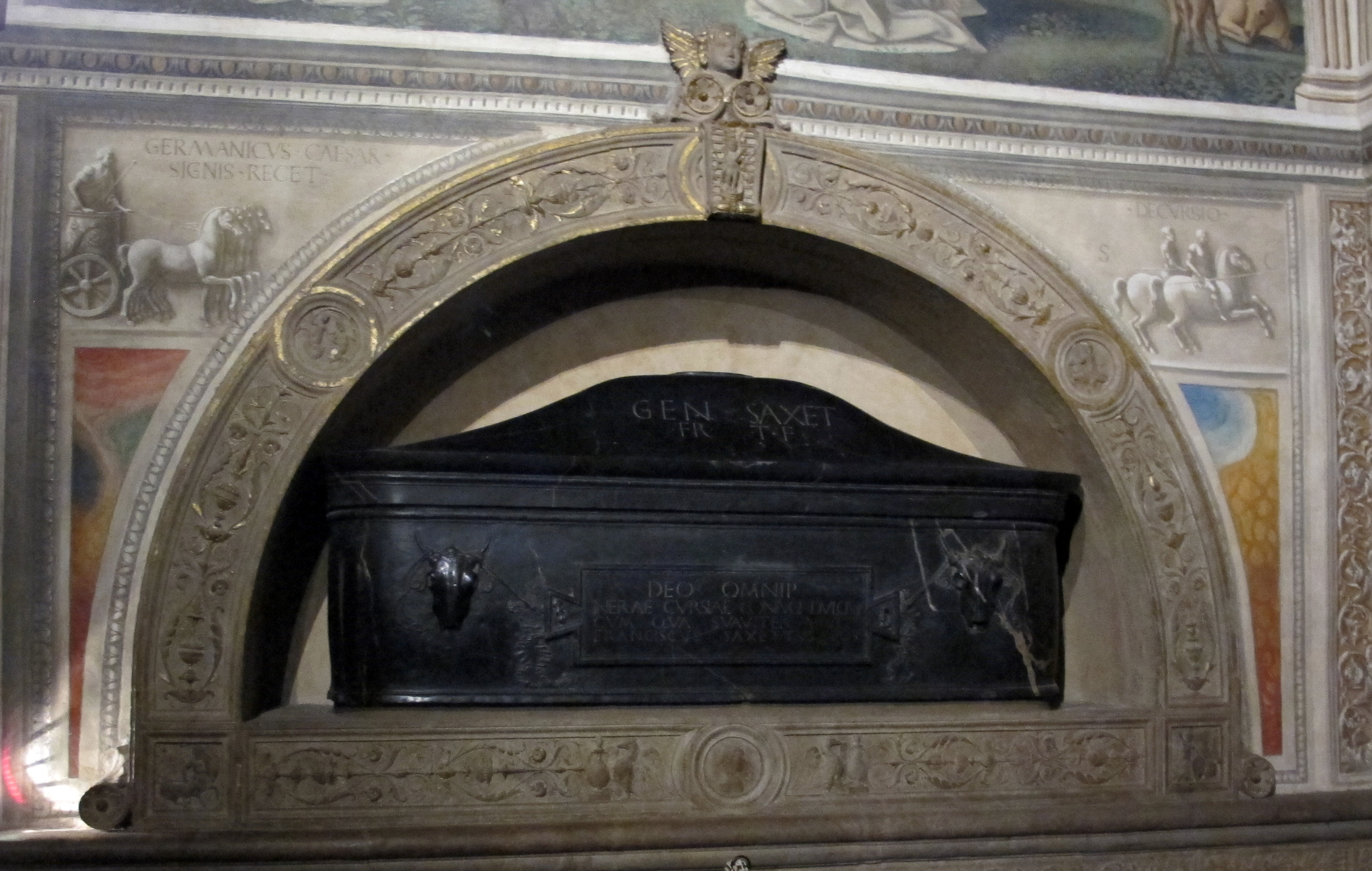

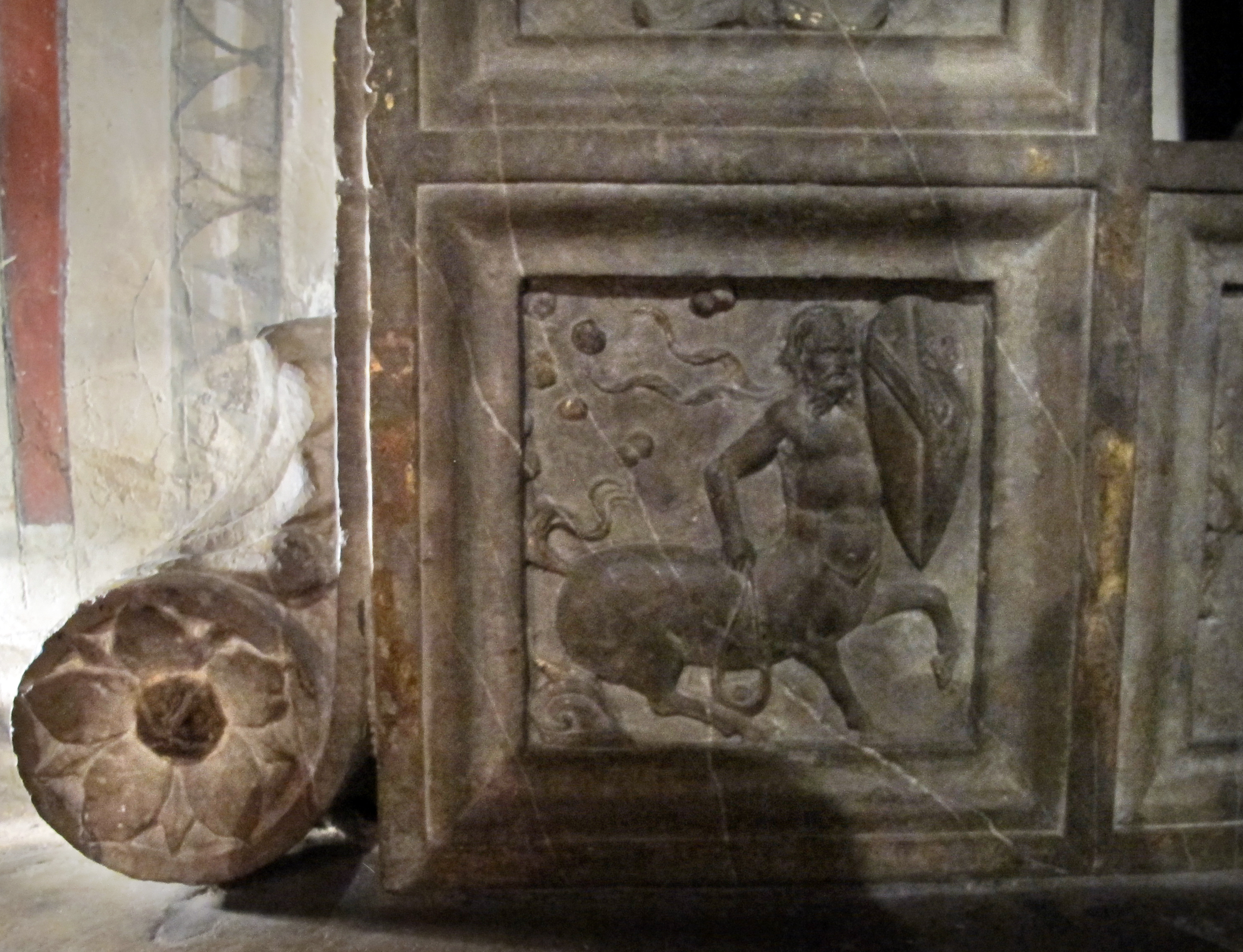

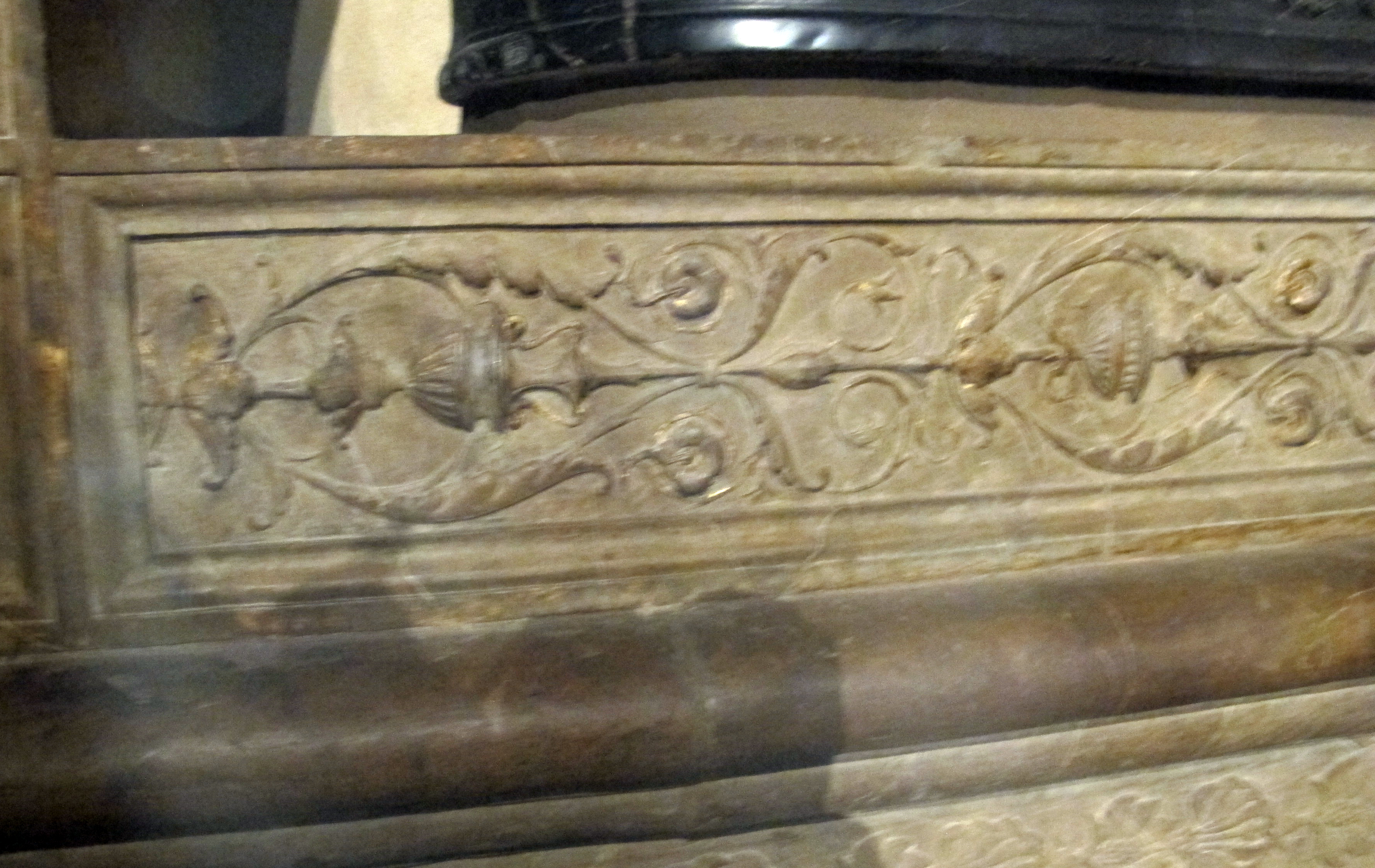

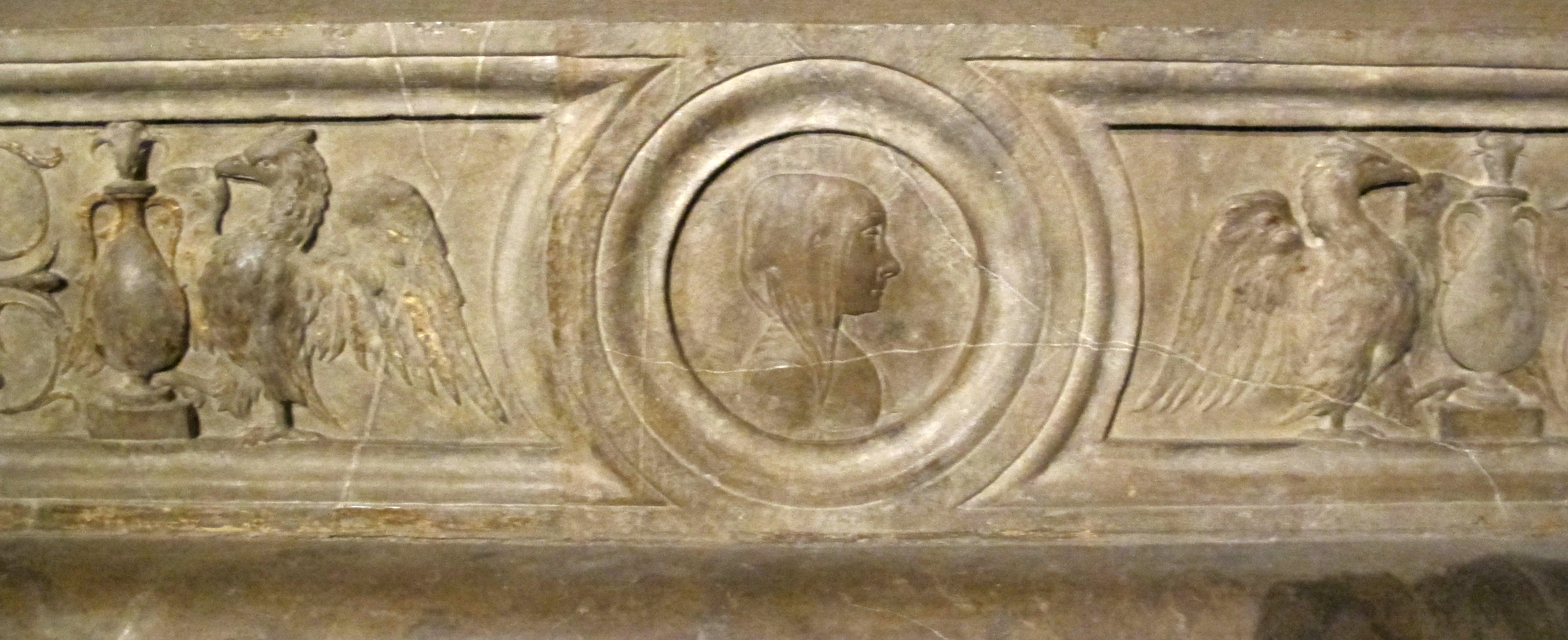
