= Medici Bank =

Italian bank, 15th century

- Industry: Financial services, banking
- Founded: 1397
- Defunct: 1494
- Fate: Liquidated
- Headquarters: Florence, Republic of Florence (present-day Italy)
- Key people: Giovanni di Bicci de' Medici; Cosimo de' Medici; Piero di Cosimo de' Medici; Lorenzo de' Medici; Francesco Sassetti; Piero di Lorenzo
- Products: Commercial banking; Investment banking; Private banking; Retail banking; Pawnbroker
- Number of employees: ~40
- Parent: Vieri di Cambio's bank
- Subsidiaries: Branches in Rome, Venice, Milan, Pisa, Geneva, Lyon, Avignon, London, Bruges

The Medici Bank (Italian: Banco dei Medici [ˈbaŋko dei ˈmɛːditʃi]) was a financial institution created by the Medici family in Italy during the 15th century (1397–1494). It was the largest and most respected bank in Europe during its prime. There are some estimates that the Medici family was, for a period of time, the wealthiest family in Europe. With their monetary wealth, the family acquired political power initially in Florence, and later in the wider spheres of Italy and Europe.

A notable contribution to the professions of banking and accounting pioneered by the Medici Bank was the improvement of the general ledger system through the development of the double entry system of tracking debits and credits or deposits and withdrawals.

Giovanni di Bicci de' Medici established the bank in Florence, and while he and his family were influential in the Florentine government, it was not until his son Cosimo the Elder took over in 1434 as gran maestro that the Medici became the unofficial head of state of the Florentine Republic.

== History ==
=== Founding ===
The Medici family had long been involved in banking at a high level, maintaining their status as a respectably upper-class and notably wealthy family who derived their money from land holdings in the Mugello region towards the Apennines, north of Florence. The Medicis were not only bankers but innovators in financial accounting. At one point, the Medicis managed many of the great fortunes in Italy, from royalty to merchants.

Giovanni's father Averardo (?–1363; known as "Bicci") was not a very successful businessman or banker. A distant cousin, Vieri di Cambio (1323–1396), however, was one of Florence's more prominent bankers (the first of the various modestly upper-class Medici lineages, numbering around 20 in 1364). His banking house trained and employed Giovanni and his elder brother Francesco (c. 1350–1412), who eventually became partners in the firm. Francesco became a junior partner in 1382, while Giovanni rose to become general manager of the Rome branch in 1385, which was incorporated as a partnership, though it was not necessary to capitalize that branch (because the Church was usually depositing funds and not borrowing). Vieri was long-lived, but his bank split into three separate banks sometime between 1391 and 1392. One bank failed quickly. The second, managed by Francesco and later his son, survived until 1443, a little less than a decade after Averardo's death. The third bank was controlled by Giovanni in partnership with Benedetto di Lippaccio de' Bardi (1373–1420).

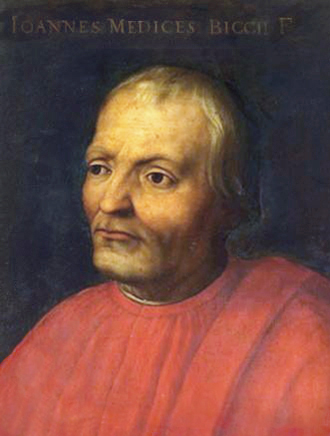
Giovanni di Bicci de' Medici

The Medici bank's founding is usually dated to 1397, since it was this year that Giovanni di Bicci de' Medici separated his bank from his nephew Averardo's bank (which had effectively been acting as a branch in Rome), and moved his small bank from Rome to Florence. The branch in Rome was entrusted to Benedetto, and Giovanni took on Gentile di Baldassarre Buoni (1371–1427) as a partner. They raised 10,000 gold florins and began operating in Florence, though Gentile soon left the firm. This move had certain advantages for a bank, inasmuch as the predominant large banks of the 14th century which were based in Florence—the Bardi, Acciaioli, Peruzzi—had met with problems, and saw their places usurped by the Alberti, who were just large enough to capture the Catholic Church's business. But the Alberti firm split over internecine quarrels, and the clan was banished from Florence in 1382 (though they would be allowed to return in 1434), creating yet another void. Giovanni's choice proved to be prescient, especially since what Florence was lacking was a good port on the Mediterranean—which it would obtain in 1406 with the conquest of Pisa and its Porto Pisano. A further advantage was that it was much easier to invest a bank's capital in Florence than in Rome, and because of the Holy See's deposits (obtained through Giovanni's long contacts with them), the bank had a fair amount of capital to invest in other ventures.

=== Rise ===
A factor was dispatched to Venice to seek out investment opportunities. He did well and on March 25, 1402, the third branch of the Medici bank was opened. It suffered from some initial mismanagement (by the factor who had previously done so well—he made the fatal mistake of violating the partnership agreement and loaning money to Germans; on a more humane note, he would eventually become a pauper and be sent 20 florins by Giovanni, who felt that a past partner deserved some charity), but soon was prospering. It was this branch that established the practice of having a general manager's remuneration be paid through shares in the branch that he purchased with his investment. Also in 1402, the first Medici factory was established for the production of woolen cloth, and then another in 1408. By this point, the Rome branch had established a branch in Naples (closed in 1425 and was replaced with one in Geneva) and Gaeta. It may seem that the Medici bank was flourishing and rapidly expanding its assets across Italy, but nevertheless there were perhaps only 17 employees in total of the bank in 1402, with only five at the central bank in Florence, although they were reasonably well-paid and promotions seem to have been rapid when warranted (such as in the case of Giuliano di Giovanni di ser Matteo, who went from being a clerk in 1401 to a junior partner in 1408).

In 1420, Benedetto de' Bardi (the ministro, or general manager, of all the branches) died, and was succeeded by his younger brother Ilarione de' Bardi, who was the manager of the Rome branch. He dissolved one of the wool factories, along with other reorganizations occasioned by partnerships coming to their designated end. This date is interesting because Ilarione's contract with his principal was done in the name of Cosimo and Lorenzo, and not their father Giovanni; this perhaps marks the beginnings of a transfer of responsibility and power in the Medici bank from one generation to the next. Two Portinaris were put in charge of the Florence and Venice branches.

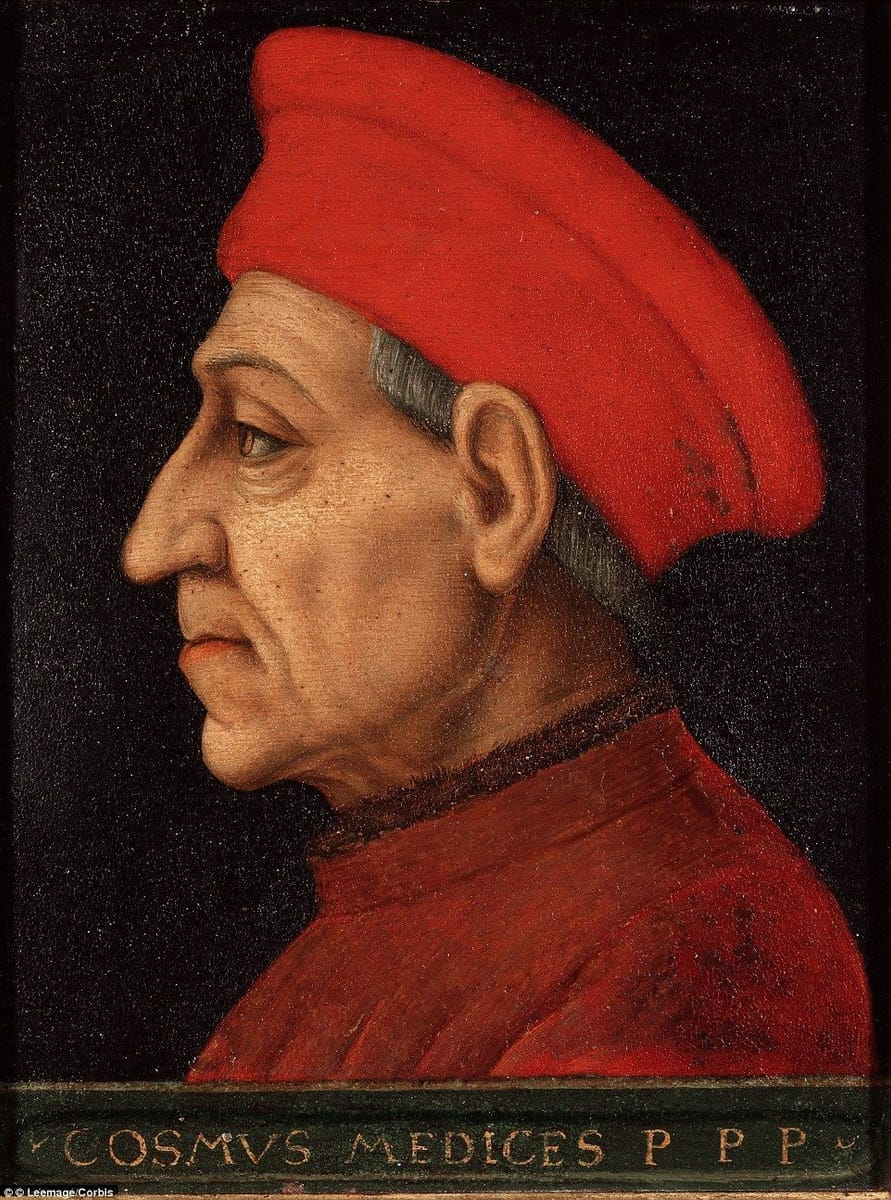
Cosimo de' Medici

Giovanni died in 1429. According to Lorenzo, his fortune upon his death was worth around 180,000 gold florins. His death did not greatly affect the bank's operations, and the transition to Cosimo went smoothly, aided by Ilarione, who was retained as ministro. Fortunately for the bank, Lorenzo di Giovanni di Bicci de' Medici was on excellent terms with Cosimo, and did not insist on dissolving the partnerships so he could receive his share of the patrimony (primogeniture not being operative here); many Florentine banks and mercantile businesses lasted only a generation or two because some of the inheriting sons usually wished to strike out on their own. At this time, the Medici bank was flourishing: besides the branches in Rome and Florence, the Venetian and Genevan branches had been founded. Ilarione would not last long in his position, and is mentioned as dead in a letter written in February 1433. The timing was unfortunate because the Albizzi government of Florence was moving against the young Medici-led resistance (galvanized by the Albizzi government's failure in a war against Lucca and Milan), culminating in Cosimo's exile to Venice. Despite the unfavorable politics in this period of the bank's history, its Italian branches turned in bumper profits, with as much as 62% of the total coming from Rome (in 1427, the Roman branch of the Medici bank had approximately 100,000 florins on deposit from the Papal Curia; in comparison, the total capitalization of the entire Medici bank was only about 25,000 gold florins) and 13% from Venice between 1420 and 1435 (with the later Medici branches opened in Bruges, London, Pisa, Avignon, Milan, and Lyon contributing nothing as they had not been founded yet). At this time, there seems to have been some sort of Medici office in Basel, and it seems to have lasted until 1443. De Roover speculates that it was a sub-branch of the Medici bank's Geneva branch serving the General Council of the Church, and was closed when the Council no longer made it worth their while to maintain it.

=== Maturation ===
On March 24, 1439, the Medici branch at Bruges was officially founded. While the Medicis had done business in Flanders through correspondents and agents since 1416, it was only when the son of the Venice branch's manager (from 1417–1435) was sent to investigate in 1438 and favorably reported back that it was incorporated as a limited liability partnership with that son, Bernardo di Giovanni d'Adoardo Portinari (1407–c.1457), assuming both the position of manager and the majority of the liability. When Angelo Tani (1415–1492) became junior partner in 1455, the branch was finally created as a full and equal partnership in the Medici bank. A legally similar situation was obtained for an "accomandita" established in Ancona, apparently to finance Francesco Sforza, an ally of Cosimo's.

As mentioned previously, Cosimo's uncle had begun a bank with his third of the ownership stake in Vieri's bank, and it closed in 1443 with the death of the grandson of Averardo, taking with it the Medici branch in Pisa. Formerly, any business that the Medici needed to transact in Pisa (such as Cosimo forwarding Donatello money to buy marble) had been done through them. On December 26, 1442, a limited liability partnership was formed with two outsiders. Over time, the Medici progressively reduced their investment in this partnership, and it appears that they withdrew completely sometime shortly after 1457, with only one partner keeping it running until 1476.

1446 saw the start of two Medici branches: the sub-branch that was the Bruges branch was converted into a full partnership, and a limited liability partnership in Avignon, the largest center of trade in southern France (despite the departure of the Papacy). Within 2 years, the Avignon branch was converted into a full partnership. The Medici branch at Lyons was not actually founded as a separate branch; it came about as a result of the gradual move of the Geneva branch, due to the reduction in traffic to the fairs at Geneva and the establishment of four major fairs in Lyons which attracted around 140 other Florentine businesses). The move was completed in 1466.

The structure and functions of the Medici bank were largely settled into their final form by this point; a branch would be opened in Milan in late 1452, or early 1453, at the instigation of the grateful Sforza. Its first manager Pigello Portinari (1421–1468) was very capable and this branch did well in loaning to the Sforza court and, like the Roman branch, selling luxuries such as jewels, until Pigello died and was replaced by his feckless brother Accerrito (1427–c.1503) who could not manage the massive amounts lent to the Milanese court and to Duke Sforza (who did not repay his debts of 179,000 ducats before his death in 1478). A similar problem would plague the Bruges branch of the bank when managed by the third Portinari brother, Tommaso.

Still, this period (1435–1455) under Cosimo and his ministro Giovanni Benci was the Medici bank's most profitable period. With Cosimo's death on August 1, 1464, the decline of the bank began.

=== Decline ===
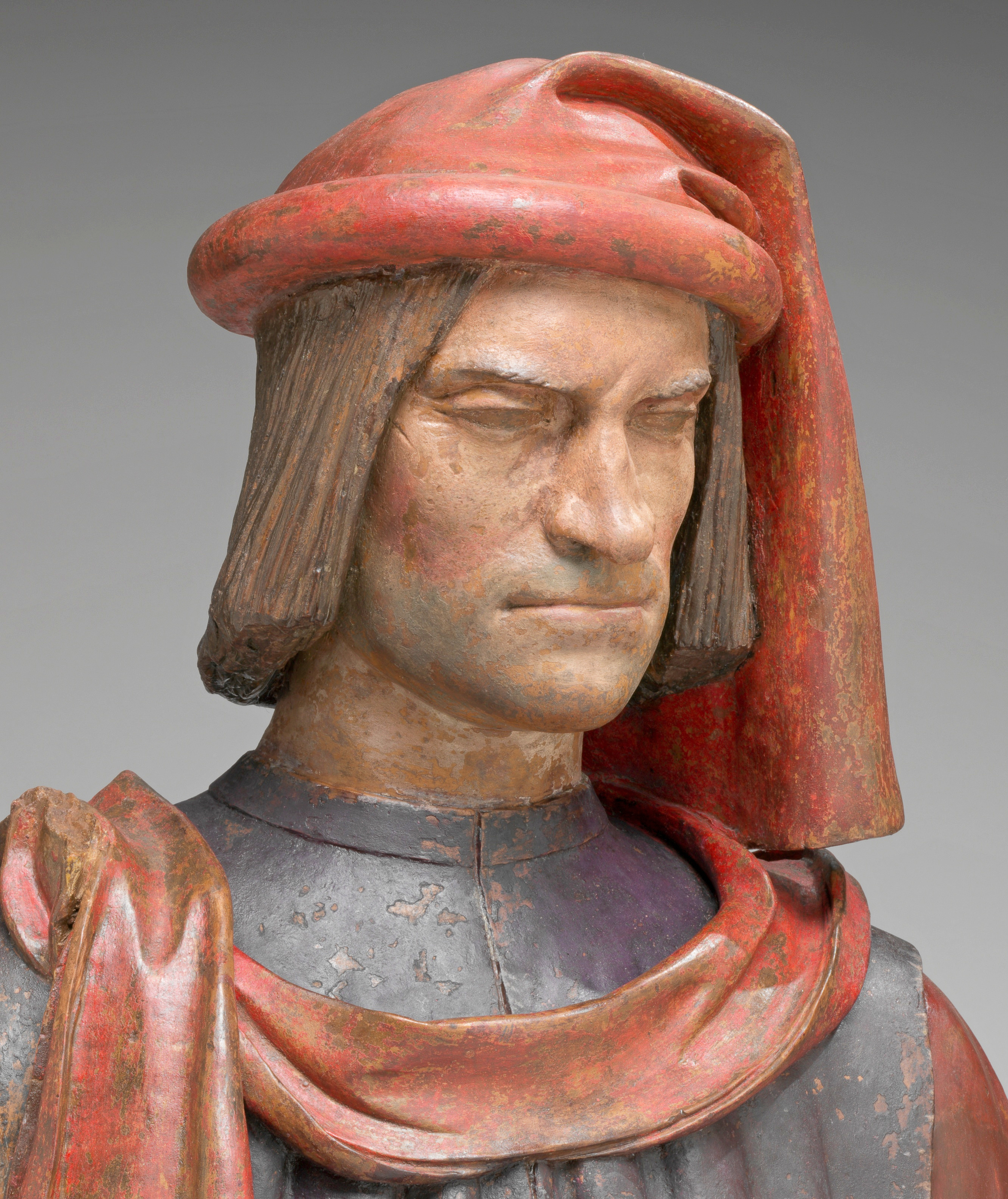
Lorenzo de' Medici

==== Failure in Lyon and London ====
An early sign of the decline was the near-failure of the Lyon branch because of its manager's venality, saved only by heroic efforts by Francesco Sassetti (1421–1490). Its troubles were followed by the troubled London branch, which got into trouble for much the same reason the Bruges branch would—unwisely loaning large sums to secular rulers, a group notorious for their delinquencies (in this case, the Yorkist Edward IV). In a sense, that branch had no choice but to make the loans, since it faced domestic opposition from English merchant and clothier interests in London and their representatives in Parliament, which was only granting the necessary export licenses to foreign-owned enterprises if its members were well-bribed with loans. The London branch of the Medici bank had already been dropped as a full partnership in 1465, and had been reincorporated as an accomando. In 1467, Angelo Tani was dispatched to audit the London branch's books. Tani attempted to step up the collection of outstanding debt—the English king owed 10,500 pounds sterling (equivalent to £10.5 million in 2025), the English nobility 1,000, and another 7,000 pounds were tied up in goods dispatched on consignment and not soon recoverable. Operating funds were (like previous failing branches had done) borrowed from Medici branches at high rates of interest. Edward IV amortized a portion of his debt, but these reductions were soon rendered less helpful (but not negated outright) by fresh loans and sales of silk. By the spring of 1469, Tani had finished repairing the London branch's operations to his own satisfaction, and returned to Italy. His work would be undone by the unhelpfulness of the other branch managers and the fecklessness of the London branch manager Canigiani. The fatal blow was the Wars of the Roses, which rendered Edward IV unable to repay the loans (the best he could do in way of repayment was to lift all tariffs on the Medici exporting English wool until such time as the debt was repaid), and the branch had loaned far too much to the Lancastrian rebels (and not to a number of Yorkist loyalists), who would never repay their loans after their deaths and defeats. The London branch finished its liquidation in 1478, with total losses of 51,533 gold florins. The succeeding Tudors never paid off the outstanding Plantagenet debt.

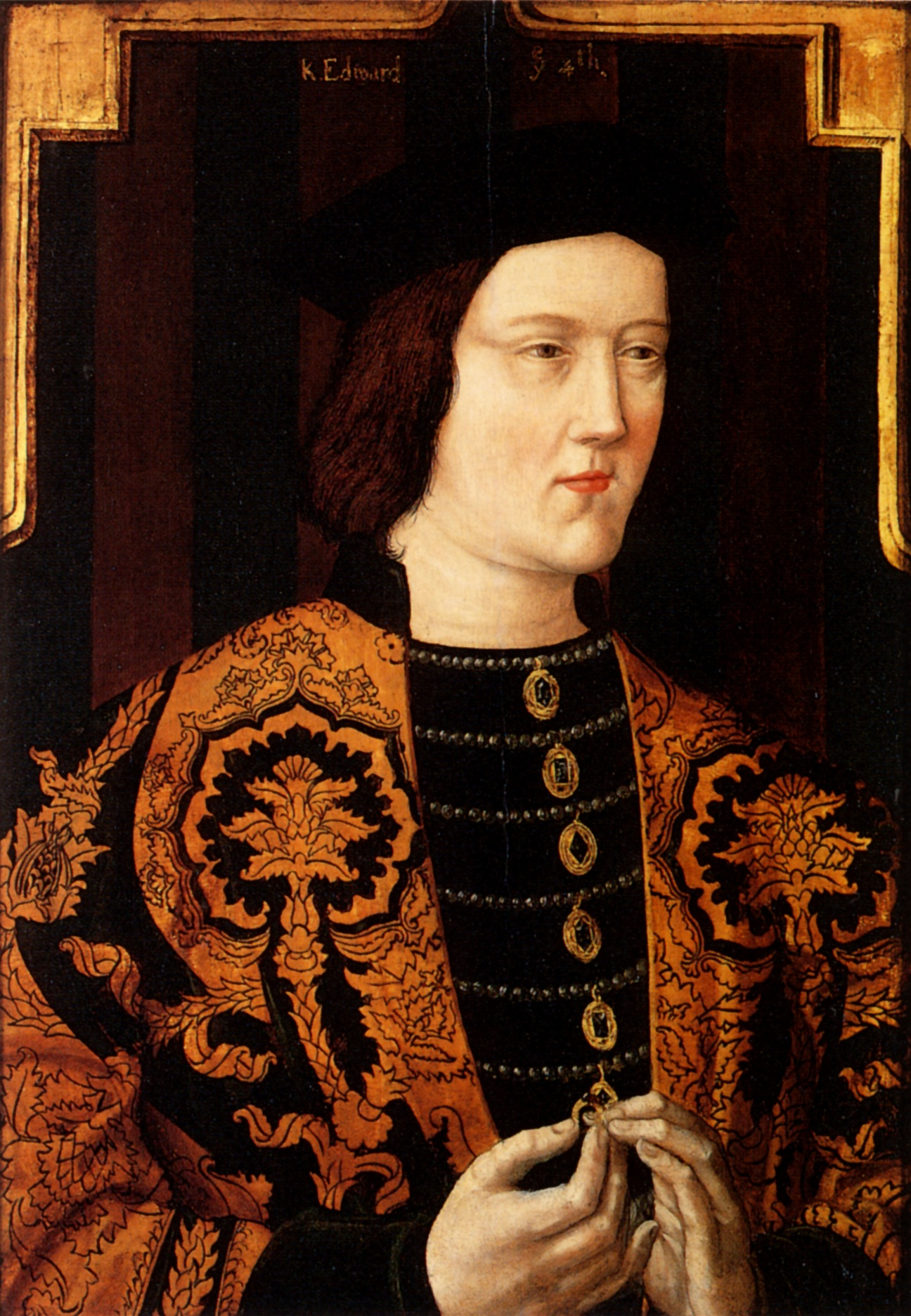
Portrait of Edward IV

==== Failure in Bruges ====
After the London branch failed, it was turned into a accomando and placed under the control of the Bruges branch, managed by the third of the Portinari brothers, Tommaso Portinari. This branch, too, would soon fail. Portinari had managed the Bruges branch for decades, and had steadily proven himself to be a poor manager—he engaged in business dealings on the side, ingratiated himself with the Burgundian court by excessive loans (first to secure the farming of the toll of Graveline—which was never very profitable—and then to mingle socially and elevate himself), made poor business deals like purchasing two galleys (which would be partially sold off at a loss; the rest would be lost to shipwreck and piracy). The debts from the London branch were assumed by the Bruges branch. After Piero's death, Portinari managed to get articles of partnership so favorable that he lived in Florence, only visiting the Low Countries for business. The end-period of the branch would be marked by chaos and possibly fraud. Portinari would refuse to return some deposits, claiming that the monies had really been invested in partnership. He would also claim Angelo Tani as a full partner (and thus liable in the losses), despite the fact that Tani never signed the articles or written with his approval. The magnitude of the financial failures is hard to state. In a surviving memorandum, Lorenzo the Magnificent gives the bad debts to Charles the Bold alone as the sum of 16,150 pounds groat. The articles of partnership, incidentally, strictly forbade Portinari to lend more than the total of 6,000 pounds groat. In another memorandum, Lorenzo faults Portinari for the clever ruse of shifting all the London branch's business to the Bruges branch—except for the profitable wool business. Portinari bought into the separate partnership to the tune of 45%, whereas his share in the Bruges branch was only 27.5%. The branch was liquidated in 1478 with staggering losses. The failure of the Bruges branch meant that not only the debts of that branch had to be handled somehow, but also the outstanding debts of the former London branch. In total, upwards of 70,000 gold florins were lost. This figure is optimistic, since it assumes most book assets were worth the recorded value. As Lorenzo remarked, "These are the great profits which are accruing to us through the management of Tommaso Portinari." Lorenzo refused to take this loss lying down, and dispatched a trusted agent to Bruges to audit the books and dissolve the partnership. Portinari ironically found himself hoisted by his own petard; he could not refuse the dissolution, since the maggiore Lorenzo had given the proper notice, and he further had to accept his own cooked books because he claimed that the books were accurate and the rather doubtful assets listed were indeed worth what they were worth. The agent Ricasoli was aided in this task by Angelo Tani, who came all the way from Florence to settle the matter of his supposed partnership in the London branch through the Bruges branch.

==== Decay ====
Upon Cosimo's death, his estate and control of the bank passed to his eldest son, Piero di Cosimo "the Gouty" (Piero il Gottoso). Piero had been given a humanist education, unlike his younger brother who was trained in business but had died in 1463. The estate remained intact, though in this case not as a result of good relations between brothers, but because one of the two heirs died before inheriting. In theory, Lorenzo's son Pierfrancesco could have insisted on his share of the estate, but Pierfrancesco was raised by Cosimo and "his emotional ties to his uncle were sufficiently strong to preclude his withdrawal from the company." Pierfrancesco seems to have grown increasingly disaffected, but his death in 1476 prevented any separation. In retrospect, given how Lorenzo would steal from Pierfrancesco's estate while raising his two sons to finance the war against Rome following the Pazzi Conspiracy, Pierfrancesco would have been wiser to effect such a separation. Specifically, Lorenzo appropriated about 53,643 gold florins and only repaid part of the sum.

Piero was not Cosimo's equal, but given his training did perhaps better than one would expect, especially considering how he was rendered bedridden by severe gout. Piero recognized the approaching problems, and tried to begin a "policy of retrenchment". This policy doesn't seem to have been fully carried out. Niccolò Machiavelli states in his history of Florence that Piero's policy involved calling in loans for repayment, which caused a number of Florentine businesses to collapse, sparking a plot against Piero and Medici rule.

Whether Machiavelli is overstating issues and Piero had merely ordered a thorough accounting is unknown. Machiavelli can probably be trusted here since there was a rash of bankruptcies and bank failures in Florence shortly after Cosimo's death which led to a small recession. De Roover mentions, however, the war between Venice and the Ottoman Empire and the relevant firms' connections to that area as a possible factor as well. It is certain, however, that Piero tried to wind up the London branch and recover as much of the loans made to Edward IV as possible, ordered the Milan branch to loan less, instructed Tommaso Portinari of the Bruges branch to get rid of the galleys and not make any loans to secular rulers, and attempted to shut down the Venice branch which was no longer profitable. From the perspective of carrying out his policies, Piero faced a number of obstacles—it was always politically costly to demand that loans be repaid, particularly when made to monarchs and powerful nobles and such demands could cost Piero dearly close to home. The king of England could block any attempts to export English wool by the Medici, which was desperately needed by the bank for two reasons. English wool was the finest in the world; if Florence's artisans did not have a supply of English wool to weave, it could not sell its textile wares, and more importantly, could not employ the Florentine lower classes who specialized in textiles. Flemish wool had once served in English wool's place, but after the 1350s, it no longer had a market in Italy and was essentially not imported after 1400. Unemployment generated considerable political unrest and revolts, which would be aimed at Piero and the Medici since he and his family were seen as the true rulers of Florence. The second reason was that there was a systemic specie problem in the Medici bank in which hard currency flowed south to Italy from the northern countries, and the import of English wool was necessary to provide a conduit for currency to flow north and balance the books. So when King Edward IV demanded loans, the London branch had little choice but to oblige him if it wanted to continue to export English wool to Florence.

By 1494, the Milan branch of the Medici bank also ceased to exist. The branches that did not die off on their own generally met their end with the collapse of the Medicis' political power in Florence in 1494, when Girolamo Savonarola and the Pope struck against them. The central Florentine banco was burned by a mob, the Lyons branch was taken over by a rival firm, and the Roman branch struck off on its own despite the branch being bankrupt in general (ironically, they would suffer still more debts when a Medici cardinal became Pope Leo X and inquired after the 11,243 gold florins he had deposited with the branch back when it was with the Medici bank). Even at the time of its downfall, the Medici bank was the biggest bank in Europe, with at least seven branches and over fifty factors.

De Roover attributes the beginning of the bank's decline to Cosimo de' Medici. He spent the vast majority of his time wrapped up in politics, and when he was not preoccupied with the intricate plotting and other characteristics of Florentine politics, he was patronizing the many fine Renaissance scholars and artists who were present there, or engaged in composing his own renowned poetry. This left minimal time for the careful selection of branch managers and the maintenance of an alert watch against fraud within the bank, which was greatly needed. Most of the financial duties handed over to Francesco Sassetti, who had risen from being a mere factor in the Avignon branch to its general manager, and then a post in Geneva eventually to end up in 1458 in Florence proper at Cosimo's side. Sassetti was left to handle much of the business himself. In the end, it turned out badly. Whether simply due to bad luck, old age, increasing laziness, or diversion of his time to studying humanism like Cosimo, Sassetti failed to discover the fraud at the Lyons branch until it was too late for it to hope to remain solvent. The branch manager Lionetto de' Rossi had attempted to cover up his incompetence by being far too optimistic as to the number of bad loans the branch would have to cover, and by borrowing funds from other banks, thus artificially inflating his profits.

That, however, is not the only factor that caused the fall. A long term trend in the devaluation of gold against silver (which held steady) between 1475 and 1485—possibly thanks to increased output by German and Bohemian silver mines—meant that as creditors, the Medici Bank was on the wrong side of the trend. Their deposits were held in gold, and interest was paid in gold. This trend was in part attributable to Florence's reluctance to debase the gold florin, which was internationally esteemed for its stable value, prestige, and reliability. But Florence's dual coinage system only aggravated the problem. This shift in the monetary system perhaps reflected a systemic slowdown or recession in late medieval Europe in general: the Arte del Cambio's records of member banks record a drastic decline in membership such that the guild fell from 71 banks in 1399, to 33 in 1460, and then the guild itself into disuse, the outside chronicler Giovanni Cambi noting that of the 9 large banks left in Florence by 1516, one failed on December 25. This banking decline does not appear to have been specific to Florence; similar declines were seen in Bruges and Venice (although apparently not in Spain). Similarly, the northern branches of all European banks were squeezed by a general decline in the supply of English wool.

Agreement on these aggravating factors does not seem to be universal; Richard A. Goldthwaite writes in 1987 that "these economic conditions have never been adequately explained. It appears more likely that the contraction and decline of the Medici bank under Lorenzo—it was reduced to branches in only Florence, Rome and Lyons by the time he died in 1492—were due simply to bad management." He also claims that banking guild memberships cannot be used as a proxy for general economic conditions, as the problem could be that "by this time, in fact, Florentine guilds had long lost much of an economic function in the areas of their formally defined activity, with the result that the quality of their internal administration deteriorated; but this institutional history cannot be taken as an indicator of the vitality of the respective sectors of the economy the guilds nominally represented."

Piero died on December 2, 1469. He was succeeded by his two sons, Lorenzo and Giuliano. Lorenzo's interest in politics and art (which led to his appellation "the Magnificent") forced him to rely on his ministro Francesco Sassetti to handle most affairs of the bank. Sassetti can be faulted and inculpated in the decline of the bank for failing to prevent the disasters of Lyon and Bruges, and Lorenzo for relying too much on Sassetti and not listening to him when Sassetti did notice problems or tried to fix things. Indeed, Lorenzo once said when Angelo Tani (who had tried to prevent the failure of the Bruges branch) appealed to him to overrule Sassetti and restrict the lending of the London branch, that "he [Lorenzo] did not understand such matters." He would later admit that his lack of knowledge and understanding was the reason he approved Tommaso Portinari's disastrous schemes. Goldthwaite faults Lorenzo in no uncertain terms:

Lorenzo il Magnifico, for whom politics always took priority over business. Service to the court and the aristocracy was probably the chief reason for establishing branches in both Milan in 1452 or 1453 and Naples in 1471, and over-extension of credit through personal loans created severe and ultimately insurmountable problems for both operations.

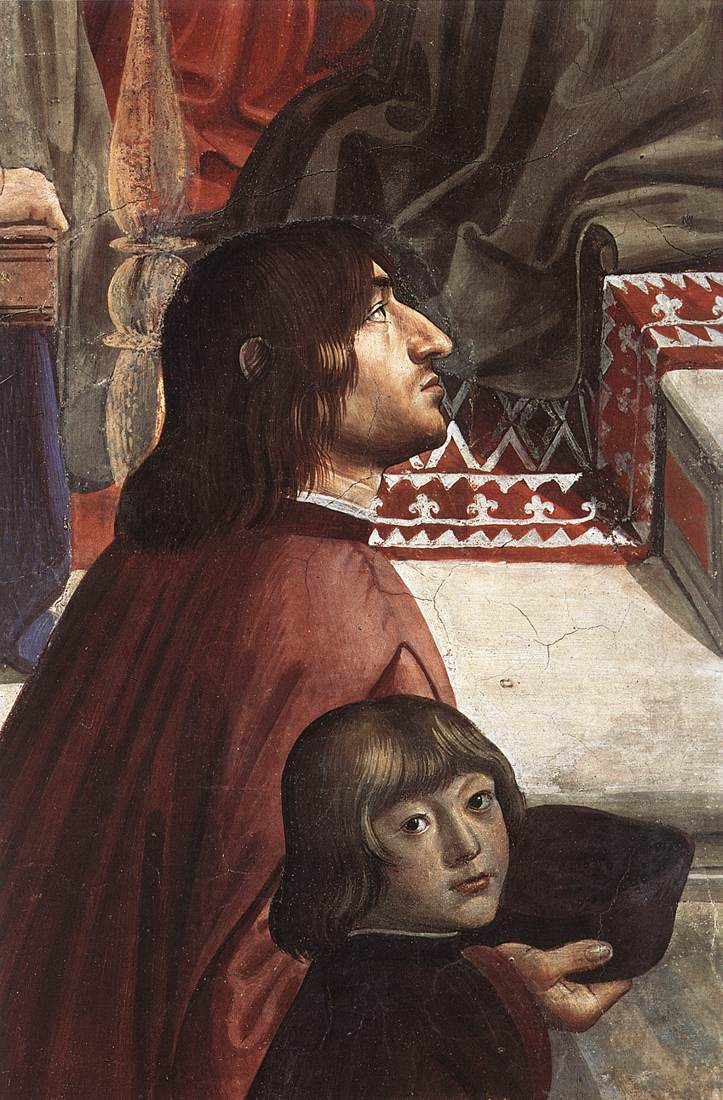
Poliziano with Giuliano as a child

With Lorenzo's death on April 8, 1492, the succession passed to his 20-year-old son Piero di Lorenzo (1472–1521). Piero had no talent for running the bank and depended on his secretary and his great-uncle Giovanni Tornabuoni to handle everything. The two mismanaged the bank and balked the new ministro's, Giovambattista Bracci, efforts (Sassetti having died of a stroke in March 1490). If the Medici family and its bank had not been politically overthrown in 1494, it would probably have failed shortly thereafter in a long-delayed bankruptcy.

Another factor in the decline of the Medici bank were the spending habits of the Medici. According to Lorenzo, between 1434 and 1471, the family spent an average of 17,467 gold florins a year.

Another misjudgement or failure by Sassetti was placing his trust in Tommaso Portinari instead of in more trustworthy managers like Angelo Tani; Portinari would eventually cause the collapse of the bank's Bruges branch.

Niccolò Machiavelli gave a more contemporary viewpoint in his Istorie fiorentine, asserting that the fall of the Medici was due to their loose rein on their bank's managers who began to act like princes and not sensible businessmen and merchants.

==== Fall ====
When the crisis loomed, one way to try to avert it was to simply start reducing the interest paid on discretionary and demand deposits. But such a move would have hurt the Medici name, and so it was undertaken too late. The bank's heavy leverage of their deposits meant that setbacks could be quite sudden. The fact that it seems to have been a common practice for Florentine banks to operate with as little as 5% of their deposits held in reserve lends further support to the idea that collapses could happen abruptly when bad loans were discovered. In addition to all of that, Lorenzo the Magnificent was not at all concerned about the bank. Instead, he chose to concentrate his time and his family's resources on patronizing artists and pursuing his own poetic and political interests.

Eventually, the Medici family's fiscal problems grew severe enough to force Lorenzo to begin raiding Florence's state treasuries, at one point defrauding the Monte delle doti, a charitable fund for paying for dowries. Shortly thereafter, the political pressure of King Charles VIII of France's 1494 invasion of Italy caused Piero di Lorenzo de' Medici to concede to the dual forces of Charles and the impending insolvency of the Medici bank. The Medici bank's remaining assets and records were seized and distributed to creditors and others. All the branches were declared dissolved.

== Bank heads ==
- Giovanni di Bicci de' Medici, c. 1397–1429
- Cosimo de' Medici, 1428–1464
- Piero di Cosimo de' Medici, 1464–1469
- Lorenzo de' Medici (the Magnificent), 1469–1492
- Piero di Lorenzo de' Medici, 1492–1494

== Sources ==
Not much remains of the Medici Bank's records; mentions of it and its activities are rife in the writings of outsiders, but outsiders necessarily had little access to the balance books which could truly tell the story of the bank's rise and fall, and certainly not to the confidential business correspondence and the secret books. Some of the most copious documentation, derived from archived tax records such as the catasto records, are largely useless since the various principals of the bank were not above flagrantly lying to the taxman. The once voluminous internal documentation has been grievously reduced by the passage of time:

This study is based mainly on the business records of the Medici Bank: partnership agreements, correspondence, and account books. The extant material is unfortunately fragmentary; for example, no balance sheets have survived. Only a few pages of some of the account books have escaped destruction by a frenzied mob.

Nevertheless, the sources are sufficiently numerous (exceeded only by the Datini's bank's archives, in Tuscany/Prato) that the Medici bank is well understood, especially as the remains of the Medici records were given to the city of Florence by a descendant of the Medici.

== Organization and type ==
Banks in Renaissance Florence were generally divided into three or four kinds:

1. banchi di pegno: pawn shops, which catered to the lower classes, were excluded from the banking or more literally, the "money-changing" guild (Arte del Cambio), and were allowed to charge up to 20% annually on loans they made which were secured by the borrower property. The pawnbrokers (a mix of Christians and Jews; exclusively Jewish after 1437) were socially ostracized since they openly violated the Catholic Church's ban on usury; as a consequence, they were actually illegal in Florence, but survived since the official penalty was a collective fine of 2000 florins each year, which when paid disallowed the imposition of any further punishments on them for the sin of usury; this law is generally characterized as really being a license in disguise.
2. banchi a minuto (small or retail banks): the most obscure of the three, they were sort of combinations of lenders and pawnbrokers. They dealt in, among other things, bullion, installment sales of jewels and loans secured by jewels, and currency exchange. None of the surviving records mention anything but time deposits (for the purposes of raising capital), so they generally did not offer demand accounts and maintain the interest by lending out a portion of the deposits. Such banks did lend without security, though; one example of a banco a minuto (run by Bindaccio de' Cerchi) invested heavily in purchasing future interest payments from the Monte (Monte delle doti, a "seven percent dowry fund" founded in the 1340s by the state of Florence), loans to the Monte Comune, maritime insurance, and speculation in horse races. The Medici bank was not a banco a minuto, although between 1476 and 1491, Francesco di Giuliano de' Medici (1450–1528) was involved in two that dealt heavily in jewelry (one of whose partnership contracts explicitly states that as a goal, though the more successful ones dealt in all sorts of luxuries like Spanish tuna). Such banks were members of the Arte del Cambio as they were not "manifest usurers".
3. banchi in mercato or banchi aperti: transfer and deposit banks, who did their business out in the open of a public square, recording all their transactions in a single journal visible on their table (tavola, hence their collective name as tavoli), which they were required by law to only transfer between accounts when the customers were observing. Similarly, transfers between banchi aperti were done outside, and verbally. Theirs was an extremely risky business; by 1520, bank failures had reduced the number of Florentine banchi aperti to only two. Regardless, they were members of the Arte del Cambio.
4. banchi grossi ("great banks"): the largest financial institutions in Florence, though not the most numerous (only 33 in 1469 according to Benedetto Dei). They were the major movers and shakers in the European economy. They had vast accumulations of capital, multi-generational projects, and were a mainstay of the Florentine economy, because not only did they deal in time deposits, demand deposits, and discretionary deposits (depositi a discrezione), they expended most of their efforts in funneling their capital into commerce and bills of exchange. Such bills could be a hidden and legal method to create loans bearing interest. The Medici Bank was such a bank. One Medici branch manager (Tommaso Portinari) said: "The foundation of the [Medici bank] business rests on trade in which most of the capital is employed." Similarly, the articles of association frequently said something along the lines of the purpose for the partnership being "to deal in exchange and in merchandise with the help of God and good fortune." Under Cosimo, the Bank had interests in wool, silk, alum and merchant vessels—entirely separate from the many financial instruments and relations it managed. Despite their membership in the Arte del Cambio (assuming they bothered to run a local bank in Florence itself), these merchant banks' focus were determinedly international in scope, where profits could be found, local markets being very competitive.
  Sometimes these banks were referred to as gran tavoli ("big table") or variants thereof, due to their origins as banchi in mercato; the difference between them and banchi grossi was more one of degree than kind.

=== Bank branches ===
Because of communication delays, the Medici Bank was forced to establish two groups of relatively independent subsidiary units in important cities which communicated with the head bank via mail. Pisa, Milan, Venice in 1402, Geneva (moved to Lyons in 1466), Avignon, Bruges, London and an itinerant branch that followed the Pope around to tend to his needs—not for nothing have they been called "God's Bankers"—all hosted a Medici branch. If the bank could not establish a branch somewhere, then they would usually contract with some Italian banker (preferably one of the Florentine banks) to honor drafts and accept bills of exchange:

So the Medici were represented by the firm of Filippo Strozzi and Co. in Naples, by Piero del Fede and Co. in Valencia, by Nicolaio d'Ameleto and Antonio Bonafè in Bologna, by Filippo and Federigo Centurioni in Genoa, by Gherardo Bueri—a close relative of Cosimo—in Lübeck, and so forth.

Of course, if an Italian agent could not be procured, any trustworthy banker would do; in Cologne, their representative was the German Abel Kalthoff.

A crucial distinction between the Medici Bank and its older rivals (the Peruzzi, the Bardi, the Acciaioli, etc.) was that its "decentralization" was not merely geographic: it was legal and financial. The Peruzzi bank was taken over by outsiders in 1331 because there was but one partnership, based in Florence and held largely by Peruzzi family members, which owned everything. The employees were only paid a salary for their service. So the nine original outsiders could slowly leverage their 21 1/4 shares to overwhelm the Peruzzi's collective 36 3/4 shares. The lack of clear leadership, though, when the leading partner died has been suggested as another factor in the failure of the Bardi and Peruzzi banks.

==== Branch legal structure ====
Such a takeover was impossible in the Medici Bank. The essential structure was that of a single partnership based in Florence, which immutably held the lion's share of shares in each branch (and the three textile factories in Florence), which were themselves incorporated as independent partnerships. At the end of the year on March 24 (by the then used calendar), each partnership would be dissolved, although the Medici could dissolve a partnership at any time with six months' notice. The books were thoroughly gone through and checked, and a reckoning of profits would be made. Indeed, the structure of the Medici Bank resembles nothing so much as the modern holding company.

The branch manager (the governatore, or "governor", would have put up a portion of his own money at the start of the partnership) and the investing partners could take out their profits at this point, since salaries or dividends were not paid when the partnership agreement was in effect, but usually the Florentine partners (maggiori, "seniors") and the branch manager would then incorporate a fresh partnership if the manager's performance had been satisfactory. Managers were not paid salaries, but were considered to have invested in the partnership a sum greater than they actually had (for example, in 1455, the Venice branch's partnership agreement was renewed and the manager Alessandro Martelli invested 2,000 of the 14,000 ducats. He would be paid of the total profits not his fair 1/7th, but rather 1/5th).

The manager could, if he wished, attempt to start a rival bank, but he could not legally claim to be part of the Medici Bank, since a right to use that trademarked name came with the partnership. This measure would turn out to be effective against ambitious dissident juniors like Tommaso Portinari. However, even before the shares' profits were paid out, any sums invested in the branch outside of an ownership of shares were repaid at a set interest rate, sometimes leading to one branch paying another for the latter's investment in the former.

Governors were given wide latitude in daily operations and in the management of their seven or eight assistant managers, clerks, cashiers, accountants, or couriers who lived and boarded at the Medici-rented employee housing (although the managers had little say in their selection, which was done by the Florence bank), but policy was set by the seniors, and often firmly. The Bruges branch was, when first incorporated, strictly forbidden by the terms of the partnership to lend money to temporal lords and kings. Policy would generally be communicated to the branch managers during their biennial or triennial trips to Florence to report in person and discuss important issues, or in the private letters and reports their couriers carried.

==== Bills of exchange ====
Usury was still banned by the Church in this period, with an interpretation concisely expressed as Quidquid sorti accedit, usura est ("Whatever exceeds the principal is usury"). So the Medici Bank could not openly adopt the modern formula of promising to pay interest on demand deposits and loaning out a fraction of the deposits at greater interest to pay for the interest on the deposit, since a depositor would gain revenue on the principal without any risk to the principal, which would have made both parties usurers and sinners; nor could they charge fees or other such devices.

Discretionary deposits were a partial way out, but the bank made most of its money by selling holographic "bills of exchange". These bills certified that a particular person or company had paid a particular Medici branch a certain sum of money, as verified by the general or assistant manager of that branch (who were the only ones allowed to make out such bills). The bill instructed the recipient Medici branch to pay back that sum in local currency, but not at whatever the local exchange rate for the two currencies concerned happened to be at the moment the bill was presented to be cashed in, but rather at the exchange rate set when the presenting (or current owner; bills of exchange could be sold and traded freely) person bought the bill of exchange. That there was a difference in time was guaranteed by the terms of the bill. A specific date could be set, but generally the time between a bill was issued in one city and could be cashed in at another was set by long-standing custom, or at usance. The usance between Florence and London was 3 months, for example.

A fictional but illustrative example: a merchant is traveling from Florence to London. He buys a bill of exchange for 10 florins, with the understanding that the London branch will cash that bill at half a pound to the florin, for a total of 5 pounds. If he reaches London and discovers that the florin has become stronger against the pound, to the point where a florin buys a whole pound, he takes a loss: instead of the 10 pounds he could have gotten had he not bought the bill of exchange, he will instead receive only 5. Similarly, if the florin weakens greatly, he could well reap a windfall at the expense of the London branch.

Clearly the branches would want to try to maximize sales of bills of exchange in the former situation, where the rate of the issuing currency increases between the time of issuance and payment. This they attempted to do with frequent letters between branches and paying close attention to exchange rates. While close to loans, the element of risk meant that this practice did not actually become usury, except in the case of "dry exchange", where the moving around of money was fictitious. With appropriate issuances of bills, branches could move around money and actually make money. Similarly, they could be fairly certain of a profit when a bill was issued in one of the Italian branches because they could demand a premium of sorts for being asked to deliver money in a far away place at however far in the future usance set the maturation date. De Roover offers this real example:

Around July 15, 1441, the Medici of Venice bought a bill on Bruges at the rate of 54 1/2 groats per Venetian ducat. Two months later, when the bill matured, they received in Bruges 54 1/2 groats for each ducat. With the proceeds of this bill the Bruges branch, acting as [an] agent for the Venice branch, bought a bill on Venice, payable at the end of two months, at the rate of 51 1/2 groats per ducat. The Medici of Venice thus made a profit of 3 groats on each ducat over a period of four months, since they received 54 1/2 groats and paid 51 1/2 groats. If the exchange rate in Bruges had been 54 1/2 groats instead of 51 1/2 per ducat, the Medici of Venice would have broken even because they would have paid and received the same number of groats for each ducat.

=== Factories ===
A controlling interest in a bottega di seta (silk shop) and two botteghe di lana (cloth manufacturing establishment) were further possessions of the Medici (although run in partnership with men of the necessary technical expertise). They paid by the piece and ran on the putting-out system; for the wool especially it was a very complex system, in which the early steps had to be done in the factories but then the spinning of the wool was done by women outside the factory, and the yarn collected to be brought to the weavers, who would then turn it over to the dyers and finishers in the factory. Legally, they were incorporated much the same as the branches, although unlike the branches, the managers apparently had complete latitude in managing employees.

The silk shop produced some of the finest silk wares, and were usually sold to Florentine exporters or shipped to the branch in Bruges as a consignment to feed the Burgundian court's strong appetite for such goods, or to the branch in Milan to sell to the Sforza court. The cloth manufacturers similarly produced very high-quality pieces and sold a good deal of their output to Milan and the Sforzas.

While lucrative, the revenues realized from the three factories should not be overemphasized: while the Medici often had invested more than 7,900 gold florins in the three factories in 1458, for example, the sum invested in banks in 1458 was more than 28,800—and that figure is low, for it excludes the Rome branch serving the Pope, the Medici's interest-bearing deposits in their branches, and also omits any accounting of several years' profit which were inaccessible (since the relevant partnerships had not yet been dissolved; this may seem to be a flaw in the system, but it built up capital in a branch and allowed it to lend out more than it had been incorporated with). Part of the reason for maintaining these factories when the funds could have been more profitably invested in the banks or trade could have been social: it seems to have a bit of a Florentine tradition to run such factories to provide employment for the poor—a social obligation, as it were.

The first beginnings of the factories came in 1402. Giovanni di Bicci began a partnership to run a wool factory with an experienced manager, Michele di Baldo di ser Michele. This first wool shop was followed by a second one in 1408, this time with Taddeo di Filippo. The first one was ended in 1420; de Roover speculates that it was poorly run and so not very profitable. Eventually another one was opened in 1439; the original eventually came to an end between 1458 and 1469 for unknown reasons ("probably because of the manager's death."). The last shop was apparently being liquidated in 1480 amidst a general decline in the Florentine textile industry, and does not appear again in the tax records. The silk shop is known to have not existed before 1430; the libro segreto ("secret records", the second set of books kept to record partners' profits, and generally more accurate than the public books, inasmuch as they state the real profits and losses and which depositors were real) mention that they entered into a short partnership with two silk manufacturers. When the partnership ended, one of the two manufacturers became the manager of the silk factory until his death in 1446 or 1447. The silk shop endured until 1480, when the last descendant of that partner died.

=== Alum cartel ===
Alum was a vital commodity because of its many uses and relatively few sources. It was used in the wool preparing process to clean the wool of grease and other substances, as a mordant which fixed the dyes in the wool, in glassmaking, in tanning, and in a few other areas.

The Roman branch of the bank was not merely charged with the normal deposit and bill of exchange business of the bank, nor with just the mechanics of being "fiscal agents of the Holy See" (which entailed handling and moving the papal revenues, paying out designated subsidies to countries fighting the Turks, fees, etc., but the Medici did not actually collect the monies from sales of indulgences or taxes due the Papacy), but also with managing a certain piece of Papal property: the Tolfa alum mines, an interest they had acquired in 1473 in exchange for forgiving some of the Pope's long overdue debts to the Medici, although they had a previous interest in the "Societas Aluminum" (the company which farmed the mines after their discovery in 1460 in Tolfa near Civitavecchia; the agreement forming this company had three partners, one of whom was the mines' discover Giovanni da Castro, and was ratified by the pope on September 3, 1462) dating back to 1466, expecting that by breaking the Turkish monopoly of alum imported from the Middle East (from the mines in Asia Minor, at Phocaea near Smyrna) they could reap far more than their investments in the form of never to be repaid loans. The Medicis immediately set about trying to eliminate the competition, of which there were three main sources of large amounts of decent quality alum—Turkey, the mines in Ischia, and the mines in Volterra.

The Pope's share of the revenue was to be used to finance campaigns against the Hussites as well as the Turks, so buying Turkish alum was declared by him to be utterly immoral in that it helped the infidel enemy and hurt the faithful. Turkish alum was to be seized where it was found.

They discouraged the alum mining near Volterra in Italy, apparently pushing its inhabitants to revolt against Florentine rule. At Lorenzo's direction, the insurrection was brutally suppressed. The mines reduced output safely under Florentine (and thus, Medici) control. The sad outcome of this episode was that the sack was entirely unnecessary: exploitation of this mine was abandoned in 1483 simply because the mine was so poor that it was unprofitable.

Ischia was under the ownership and protection of the King of Naples, so the Medici and the company then exploited the Ischia mines signing a 25-year cartel agreement to restrict output and boost prices by only selling at a fixed price. This cartel flagrantly violated the teachings of the church, which tried to justify it by pointing to the virtuous military campaigns it would finance. Regardless, the cartel was not particularly successful. Turkish alum was never satisfactorily suppressed (the Pazzi bank is known to have smuggled Turkish alum into the Low Countries, for example), and the cartel was not well organized with conflict between the Medici branches. The Bruges branch and its manager Tommaso Portinari were convinced that the papal mines were simply producing far too much alum and glutting the market. They would not accept more alum on consignment until the alum they then had had finally sold.

Between this internal dissension, the dissension between cartel partners, the constant flow of Turkish alum, and the organized opposition of consumer groups, the alum interest was never as profitable as expected. Regardless of its success, or lack thereof, the alum interest ended after the Pazzi Conspiracy, in 1478, after which Pope Sixtus IV confiscated as much Medici property as he was able to.

=== Roman branch ===
The Rome branch of the Medici bank was a fully incorporated partnership which technically did not reside in Rome. It was known internally as "ours who follow the Court of Rome" (i nostri che seguono la Corte di Roma), and only contingently resided in Rome at times, as it followed the Papal court. Odd situations could occur, though. When Pope Martin V resided in the Dominican friary of Santa Maria Novella from February 1419 to September 1420, and when Pope Eugene IV stayed there, the Rome branch set up operations in Florence itself, even though the Florence branch was still in operation.

The Rome branch was always busy. The Papal court was attended by hundreds of minor officials, both ecclesiastical and secular, along with their attendants. The needs of the Papal court were such that there was a measurable rise in the frequency of money shortages wherever the court went. This led to a need for banking services that the Medici could provide. The various bishops, cardinals, and prelates often held Church or private estates in far-flung states in and beyond Italy. The revenues from these estates needed to be transferred to wherever the Court was residing. A more practical reason was that alternate investments generally took the form of real estate, and any cardinal or bishop who invested overly much in real estate (which they were not supposed to) or relied on income from Church lands might see his investments confiscated under a new Pope who might not favor him so much or even turned over to a replacement. Accounts with the Medici were kept secret and generally free from prying, ecclesiastical eyes, especially in the case of discretionary deposits.

Persons not already at the court made use of the branch for cashing letters of credit to make their pilgrimage or journey safer. Tribute from the many dioceses and institutions the Church controlled needed to be consolidated (but not collected by the Medici) and then safely transmitted. That service, too, the Medici could provide to a degree, though not in all areas. To carry out their services, the papal bankers were often given considerable power: if a banker could not collect the rents due the pope, they had but to complain and the offending cleric would be summarily excommunicated (a threat aired in 1441 against the slow Bishop of Nevers), or they could block appointments, as they threatened to do to John Kemp, whose nephew had just been appointed to the bishopric of London with their aid, if the proper payments were not soon made.

Officially, the branch could not make its money by lending at a profit to the Popes (who were lax in repaying the Medici), and taking in many deposits at interest. The branch did this to some extent, but the principal means of profit came from commercial transactions. Rather than charging interest, "the Medici overcharged the pope on the silks and brocades, the jewels and other commodities they supplied.".

These payments were entirely one way, and not exchanges. Rome and Italy generally produced little to nothing of value and so the balance of trade was greatly unequal. It could be alleviated by the production from northern silver mines, but in general the main commodity Italy was willing to exchange specie for was English wool. The decline in availability of English wool to be imported, and the general concomitant economic problems, have been identified as one of the contributing causes to the bank's decline.

At this time, the Popes frequently held great councils and conferences. These meetings of eminent and wealthy individuals gave rise to a need for advanced banking services, to such a degree that the Medici were not the only Italian bank to open up temporary branches wherever such councils were convened.

The close relation between the papacy and the branch declined over the years, with the decline especially pronounced after 1464, with few to no branch managers being selected to be the "depositary-general", the official who was essentially the fiscal agent for the Apostolic Chamber, or the Church's treasury. Pope Sixtus IV would repudiate the Medici's control of the alum trade and also his debts to them, as well as seizing Medici property in Rome following the Pazzi Conspiracy in 1478. The Pazzi's interlocked businesses and banks had captured the alum business after the Medici were removed from it, and were supplying the depositary-general from their ranks, indicating that they were trying to follow the Medici route of initially building up their empire through papal custom. The papacy would eventually agree to repay the debts, but did so extremely slowly; so slowly that the branch manager Giovanni Tornabuoni agreed to take stocks of alum instead, despite the depressed market for alum. Tornabuoni would still be in charge when 1494 came and the edifice of the Medici came crashing down. Because the branch had been doing so poorly, it owed more than it was due, so the Roman government was satisfied to allow Tornabuoni to assume the rest of the partnership's equity and debts.

=== Diagram ===
Diagram of the organization of the Medici bank, circa 1460.

Head of the firm

- Silk manufacturing
  - Manager
    - Sales: exporters and foreign branches
    - Purchases of raw silk
    - Production
      - "Throwing" the silk
        - Done in a "throwing mill"
      - Boiling the silk
        - Done by scourers
      - Weaving the silk
        - Warpers
        - Weavers
      - Dyeing the silk
        - "Tintori seta"; dyers
- Cloth manufacturing
  - Manager
    - Sales: exporters and foreign branches
    - Purchases of wool from importers and other Medici branches
    - Production
      - Preparing
        - Wool-washing
        - "Capodieci"
          - Beaters (beating or "willeying")
          - Cleaners
        - "Fattire di pettine"
          - Combers
        - "Fattire di cardi"
          - Carders
      - Spinning
        - Lanino
        - Stamaiuoli
      - Weaving
        - Warpers
        - Weavers
      - Finishing
          - Stretchers
          - Burlers
          - Scourers
          - Fullers
          - Nappers
          - Shearers
          - Menders
      - Dyeing
        - Dyers
          - Dyed in the wool
          - Dyed in the cloth
- International banking and foreign trade
  - General manager
    - Banking in Florence
      - Florence bank
        - manager
    - Branches beyond the Alps
      - Geneva
        - Branch manager
          - approximately 6 factors (a term usually used for employees abroad), 1469
      - Avignon
        - Branch manager
          - approximately 4 factors, 1469
      - Bruges
        - Branch manager
          - Assistant manager
            - approximately 6 factors (1466) handling the usual factor duties of:
              - Wool/Cloth
              - Silk
              - Banking and foreign trade
              - Clerical work
              - Bookkeeping
              - Letters, books, and errands
      - London
        - Branch manager
          - several factors
    - Branches in Italy
      - Venice
        - Branch manager
          - Factors
      - Rome
        - Branch managers
          - Foreign banking
          - Foreign trade
          - Papal banking
            - Alum mines in Tolfa
            - Handling transfers and management of Papal revenues abroad
            - Remitting subsidies abroad
      - Milan
        - Branch manager
          - Factors
    - Home office
      - Assistant manager (2)
        - "Discepoli" (clerks)

== See also ==
- Fugger
- Welser
- Rothschild family
- List of banking families
- Rockefeller family
- List of banks in Italy
