= Contractum trinius =

Set of contracts

The contractus trinus, contractus triplex, or simply triple contract, is a set of contracts used by European bankers and merchants in the Middle Ages, notably by the Fugger family, as a method of circumventing the canon law prohibition of usury.

Some Muslims are of the view that the present practice of Islamic banking relies on devices similar to the contractum trinius as a means of working around a ban of riba (usury) in religious scripture.

== Concept ==
A series of three separate contracts were offered to loan applicants: a partnership contract (societas), a contract of sale (emptio-venditio), and an insurance contract (assecuratio). Each of these contracts was permitted by canon law, but together they had the substance of an interest-bearing loan.

The triple contract worked as follows: the lender invested an amount equal to the amount of financing requested by the borrower for one year, in exchange for which the lender then took out insurance on the investment with the borrower and sold the borrower the right to any profits made over the period at a predetermined percentage. This system thus makes it possible to reproduce the effects of a loan with any interest rate agreed between the parties, but it also has the advantage of protecting the creditor against the debtor in the event of insolvency and of circumventing the prohibition of usury.

== Reception ==
=== Critics ===
Until the beginning of the 16th century, the triple contract was universally condemned by Catholic jurists and theologians because it constituted a loan with implicit interest. Thus, Thomas Cajetan, Francisco de Vitoria, Domingo de Soto and Franciscus Zypaeus criticized it in the name of the scrupulous application of the prohibition on usury. Following their opinions, Pope Sixtus V condemned in 1586, in his bull Detetabilis avaritia, the practice of commercial credits, illustrated in particular by the triple contract.

Wolfgang Musculus, although a Protestant theologian, had a nuanced opinion on the triple contract: although he could tolerate it, he nevertheless considered it morally reprehensible in that investors, too preoccupied with the love of money, no longer practiced charity. He also asked the authorities of the Holy Roman Empire to prohibit all usurious and illicit contracts. This position would later have a great influence on Lambert Daneau.

=== Defenses ===
As legal pillar of commercial capitalism, the triple contract was nevertheless defended for its practical interest. Thus Johannes Eck was the first to defend the validity of the triple contract in 1515, during a meeting organized by the Fugger Family.

If, as previously indicated, the first members of the School of Salamanca were critical of the triple contract, the later members were on the contrary quite lively in their defenses of the practice. This is the case of Leonardus Lessius who, after a thorough examination of the respect for equity within the various contracts used and a rejection of the arguments of his predecessors, seeks to legitimize commercial practices and regrets a ban that, according to him, harms the interests of society.

At the end of the 17th century, most Catholic moral theologians validated the practice of the triple contract. As the Protestant theologian Gisbertus Voetius notes, many Catholics such as Juan Azor or Johannes Malderus now defend this practice.

== Sources ==
- Decock, Wim (2019). "L'esprit catholique du capitalisme.Éthique et investissement selon Musculus et Lessius". In L. Brunori and al. (ed.). Le Droit face à l'économie sans travail. Tome I. Sources intellectuelles, acteurs, résolution des conflits (in French). Garnier. pp. 61–76.

== See also ==
- Christian finance
- Discretionary deposit
- Round-tripping (finance)
- Substance over form
- Islamic finance
