= Discretionary deposit =

A discretionary deposit is the term given to a device by medieval European bankers as a method of circumventing Catholic canon law edicts prohibiting the sin of usury. At the time, most Christian nations heavily incorporated Biblical scripture into their laws, and as such it was illegal for any person to charge interest on a loan of money.

The name comes from the workings of the device: a rich person would deposit a large sum with a bank. His name would be kept a secret (at the banker's "discretion"), as a discretionary deposit was seen as an obvious dodge around the charging of usury, and it would have embarrassed the Pope, cardinals, and various nobles and merchants who made use of this device. Every year, in gratitude for the personage's deposit, the banker would make the account a "gift", the exact amount of which would be at the banker's discretion. Of course, the gifts would work out to whatever the prevailing rate was, 8-12%, perhaps. Should a banker's "gifts" be too little, depositors would eventually take their money to another bank whose "gifts" were more commensurate with the going rate. Discretionary deposit accounts were not demand deposit accounts, and so notification of withdrawals often had to be given in advance — sometimes as much as a year.

== See also ==
- Contractum trinius
