= Monte delle doti =

15th-century Florentine savings fund for dowries

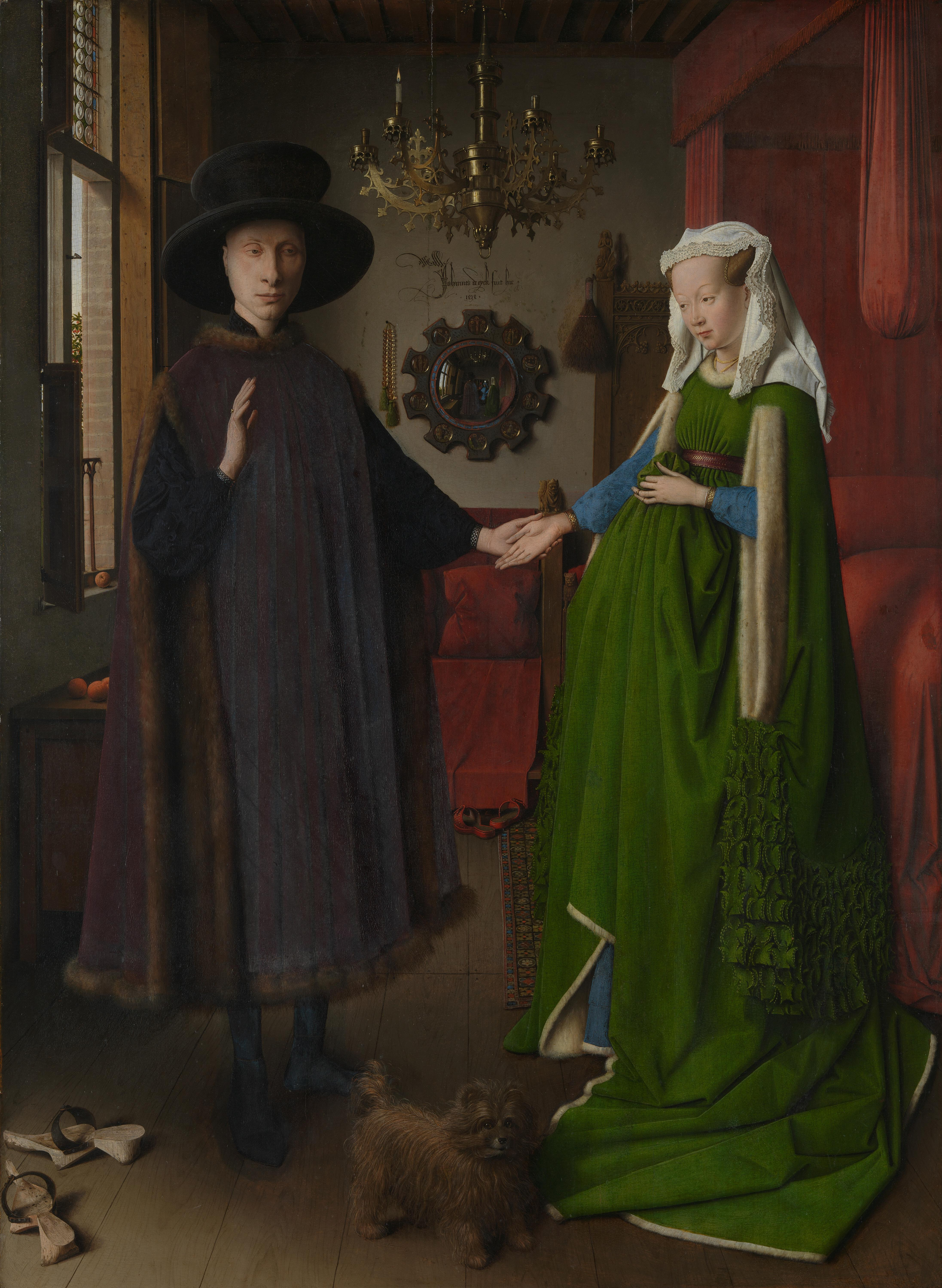
According to the art historian Linda Seidel, the Arnolfini Portrait by Jan van Eyck depicts a man who has come to consummate his marriage in order to be able to claim his wife's dowry, a custom developed as a consequence of the establishment of Monte delle doti.

Monte delle doti was a public fund established by the government of the Republic of Florence in 1425. Its purpose was to provide suitable dowries to Florentine brides.

== Background and arrangement ==
In medieval Italy, the size of the bride's dowry reflected her family's social status, making it increasingly more desirable to provide dowries as large as possible. In the decades following the Black Death the decline in population and consequent decrease in the number of eligible bachelors led to heightened competition among families for good husbands for their daughters; this led to an inflation in the value of dowries. Due to this trend, marrying off a daughter was a financial burden to a Florentine citizen, leading many fathers in the early 15th century Florence to decide not to arrange marriages for their daughters. In order to prevent serious demographic problems and promiscuity (as well as bring a much-needed injection of funds into the communal treasury, which had been severely depleted by a succession of costly wars with neighbouring states), the state came up with Monte delle doti. When a girl was on average about five years old, her father made the first payment into the fund. The deposit matured and the fund accrued at a guaranteed 11 to 12 per cent interest rate. The terms were fixed at seven and a half or fifteen years. Investing in the Monte delle doti was meant to prevent the impoverishment of the family by avoiding excessive dowries.

== History ==
At first, investing into the fund involved risk: if the girl died before marriage, the deposit could not be claimed back, and sometimes it turned out to be insolvent. There were only two depositors in the year of the fund's establishment and none between 1426 and 1429. The institution only became successful in 1433, however, when the minimum deposit period was lowered to five years and when fathers were allowed to retrieve their capital in the event of their unmarried daughter's death. The establishment of the fund also led to the abandonment of the tradition of paying the dowry on the day of the wedding. The regulations of Monte delle doti allowed the payment of the dowry only once the marriage had been consummated. This, in turn, led to a new tradition - namely, consummating the marriage at the bride's family home right after the exchange of the rings, enabling the groom to claim the dowry before taking his bride to his home.

== Female sexuality ==
Female sexuality was the basic premise of the legislation that enabled the fund, which said that the government was "determined to shore up the frailty of the female sex" and that, "provided with dowries, however small, women will be certain to lead virtuous and praiseworthy lives". Only five years earlier, the government of the Republic of Venice introduced a law limiting the size of dowries in order to spare families of the "shame and danger" of having single adult daughters living with them.

== Bibliography ==
Molho, Anthony (1994) Marriage Alliance in Late Medieval Florence. Harvard Historical Studies 114. Cambridge, Mass: Harvard University Press.
