= Florence Edler de Roover =

Florence Marguerite Edler de Roover (1900–1987) was an American medievalist. In 1945 she published groundbreaking work on the history and terminology of marine insurance, dating the first insurance contracts to Italy in the decades around 1300.

== Life ==
Born in Chicago on 15 December 1900, Florence Edler studied Romance languages and medieval history at the University of Chicago, acquiring her doctorate in 1930 with the dissertation "The Silk Trade of Lucca during the Thirteenth and Fourteenth Centuries" (published 1930).

She carried out postdoctoral research in France, Italy and Belgium. In 1936 she married the Belgian economic historian Raymond de Roover, who followed her to the United States. From 1938 to 1944 she was head of the Department of History at MacMurray College in Jacksonville, Illinois.

After her husband's death in 1972, Edler de Roover moved to Florence, Italy, to continue her research. She died in Florence on 6 September 1987. Her papers are held by the University of Chicago Library.

== Publications ==
- The Silk Trade of Lucca during the Thirteenth and Fourteenth Centuries (1930)
- Glossary on Mediaeval Terms of Business, Italian Series, 1200-1600 (1934)
- "Winchcombe Kerseys in Antwerp (1538-44)", The Economic History Review, 7:1 (1936), pp. 57-62.
- The Effects of the Financial Measures of Charles V on the Commerce of Antwerp, 1539-42, Revue Belge de Philologie et d'Histoire 16: 3-4 (1937), pp. 665-673.
- "The Van der Molen, Commission Merchants of Antwerp: Trade with Italy, 1538–44", in Medieval and Historiographical Essays in Honor of James Westfall Thompson (Chicago, 1938)
- The Market for Spices in Antwerp, 1538–1544, Revue Belge de Philologie et d'Histoire, 17:1-2 (1938), pp. 212-221.
- "The Business Records of an Early Genoese Notary, 1190-1192", Bulletin of the Business Historical Society, 14:3 (1940), pp. 41-46.
- "Partnership Accounts in Twelfth Century Genoa", Bulletin of the Business Historical Society, 15:6 (1941), pp. 87-92.
- Francesco Sassetti and the Downfall of the Medici Banking House (1943)
- "Early Examples of Marine Insurance", The Journal of Economic History, 5:2 (1945), pp. 172-200.
- Lucchese Silks (1950)
  - Die Seidenstadt Lucca (1950)
  - Lucques, ville de la soie (1952)
- "Cost Accounting in the Sixteenth Century", in Studies in Costing, edited by D. Solomons (London, 1952), pp.53-71.
- Restitution in Renaissance Florence (1957)
- Andrea Banchi, Florentine Silk Manufacturer and Merchant (1966)
- L'arte della seta a Firenze nei secoli 14. e 15 (1999)
