= Medici family tree =

== Root Medici Tree ==
Medico di Potrone (1046–1102)
Bono di Potrone (1069–1123)
Bernardo di Potrone (1099–1147)
Giambuono de' Medici (1131–1192)
Chiarissimo de' Medici I (1167–1210)
Filippo di Chiarissimo de' Medici
Averardo de' Medici I (fl. 1280)
Averardo de' Medici II (1270–1319)
Salvestro de Medici (il Chiarissimo III) (1300–1346)	Giovenco de' Medici (died 1320)
Averardo de' Medici III (1320–1363) m. Jacopa Spini	Giuliano de' Medici (d. 1377)
Giovanni di Bicci de' Medici (1360–1429) m. Piccarda Bueri
Antonio de' Medici (?–1398)	Damian de' Medici (1389–1390)	Cosimo de' Medici (the Elder) (1389–1464)	Contessina de' Bardi (ca.1390–1473)	Lorenzo de' Medici (the Elder) (1395–1440) m. Ginevra Cavalcanti	Antonio de' Medici
Piero I de' Medici (the Gouty) (1416–1469); Lord of Florence	Lucrezia Tornabuoni (1425–1482)	Carlo de' Medici (1430–1492)	Giovanni de' Medici (1421–1463) m. Ginevra degli Alessandrini	Francesco de' Medici (?–ca.1440)	Pierfrancesco de' Medici (the Elder) (1431–1476) m. Laudomia Acciaioli
Giovanni de' Medici (ante 1444–1478)	Maria de' Medici (1445–1472) m. Leonetto de' Rossi	Bianca de' Medici (1445–1505) m. Guglielmo de' Pazzi	Lucrezia de' Medici (Nannina) (1448–1493) m. Bernardo Rucellai	Lorenzo de' Medici (the Magnificent) (1449–1492); Lord of Florence m.(1) Clarice Orsini	Giuliano de' Medici (1453–1478)	Cosimo de' Medici (1452–1461)	Lorenzo the Popolano (1463–1503); Lord of Piombino m. Semiramide Appiani	Giovanni the Popolano (1467–1498) m. Caterina; Sforza	Bernardetto de' Medici (died 1475)
Lucrezia de' Medici (1470–1553) m. Jacopo Salviati	Piero II de' Medici (the Unfortunate) (1471–1503); Lord of Florence m. Alfonsina Orsini	Maddalena de' Medici (1473–1528) m. Franceschetto Cybo	Giovanni di Lorenzo de' Medici (1475–1521); Pope Leo X	Luisa de' Medici (1477–1488)	Contessina de' Medici (1478–1515) m. Piero Ridolfi	Giuliano de' Medici (1479–1516); Duke of Nemours	Giulio de' Medici (1478–1534); Pope Clement VII	Averardo de' Medici (1488–1495)	Ginevra de' Medici m. Giovanni degli Albizzi
Ippolito de' Medici (1511–1535); Cardinal)	Pierfrancesco de' Medici (the Younger) (1487–1525) m. Maria Soderini	Laudomia de' Medici m. Francesco; Salviati	Vincenzo de' Medici	Lorenzo de' Medici
Giovanni Salviati (1490–1553); Cardinal	Lorenzo Salviati (1492–1539)	Lorenzo II de' Medici (1492–1519); Duke of Urbino	Madeleine de La Tour (ca.1495–1519)	Clarissa de' Medici (1493–1528) m. Filippo Strozzi	Elena Salviati (1495–1552) m.(1) Pallavicino Pallavicino m.(2) Iacopo V Appiani	Battista Salviati (1498–1524)	Luisa Salviati m. Sigismund de Luna	Bernardo Salviati (1508–1568); Cardinal	Maria Salviati (1499–1543)	Ludovico de' Medici (Giovanni dalle Bande Nere) (1498–1526)
Francesca Salviati m. Ottaviano de' Medici	Piero Salviati	Piero Strozzi (1510–1558)	Laudomia de' Medici (?–1559)	Alamanno Salviati (1510–1571)	Lorenzino de' Medici (Lorenzaccio) (1514–1548)	Giuliano de' Medici (ca.1520–1588); Archbishop of Albi	Roberto Strozzi (ca.1512–1566)	Maddalena de' Medici (1523–1583)	Ottaviano de' Medici (1482–1546) m. Francesca Salviati
Alessandro Ottaviano de' Medici (1535–1605); Pope Leo XI	Alessandro de' Medici (the Moor) (1510–1537); Duke of Florence	Caterina de' Medici (1519–1589)	Henry II of France (1519–r.1547–1559)	Cosimo I de' Medici (1519–1574); Grand Duke of Tuscany
Bernadetto de' Medici	Giulia de' Medici (ca.1535–ca.1588)	Porzia de' Medici (1538–1565)	Francis II of France (1544–r.1559–1560)	Charles IX of France (1550–r.1560–1574)	Henry III of France (1551–r.1574–1589)	Francis, Duke of Anjou (1555–1584)	Francesco I de' Medici (1541–1587); Grand Duke of Tuscany	Claude (1547–1575) m. Charles III of Lorraine
Giulio de' Medici (ca.1533–1600)	Alessandro de' Medici (1560–1606)	Philip II of Spain (1527–r.1556–1598)	Elisabeth of Valois (1545–1568)	Margaret of Valois (1553–1615)	Henry IV of France (1553–r.1589–1610)	Marie de' Medici (1575–1642)	Christina of Lorraine (1565–1637)	Ferdinando I de' Medici (1549–1609); Grand Duke of Tuscany
Caterina de' Medici (?–1634)	Cosimo de' Medici (ca.1550–ca.1630)	Giuliano de' Medici	Philip III of Spain (1578–r.1598–1621)	Christine Marie (1606–1663) m. Victor Amadeus I of Savoy	Nicolas Henri, Duke of Orléans (1607–1611)	Gaston, Duke of Orléans (1608–1660)	Henrietta Maria of France (1609–1669) m. Charles I of England
Angela/Angelica de' Medici (1608–1636) m. Pietro Altemps	Philip IV of Spain (1605–r.1621–1665)	Elisabeth (1602–1644)	Louis XIII of France (1601–r.1610–1643)	Anne of Austria (1601–1666)	Charles II of England (1630–r.1660–1685)	Mary Henrietta Stuart (1631–1660) m. William II of Orange	James II of England (1633–r.1685–88 –1701)

== Medici family tree (Grand Dukes of Tuscany) ==
Lodovico de' Medici (1498–1526)	Maria Salviati (1499–1543)
Eleanor of Toledo (1522–1562)	Cosimo I (1519–1574); Grand Duke 1569–74	Camilla Martelli (ca.1545–1634)	Ferdinand I, Holy Roman Emperor (1503–r.1558–1564)
Bia de' Medici (1537–1542)	Maria de' Medici (1540–1557)	Isabella de' Medici (1542–1576) m. Paolo Giordano I Orsini	Giovanni de' Medici (1543–1562); Bishop of Pisa, Cardinall	Lucrezia de' Medici (1545–1561) m. Alfonso II d'Este	Pietro de' Medici (1554–1604)	Garzia de' Medici (1547–1562)	Antonio de' Medici (1548 – 1548)	Anna de' Medici (1553–1553)	Pietro (Pedricco) de' Medici (1546 – 1547)	Virginia de' Medici (1568 – 1615) m. Cesare d'Este
Johanna of Austria (1547–1578)	Francesco I (1541–1587); Grand Duke 1574–87	Bianca Cappello (1548–1587)	Christina of Lorraine (1565–1637)	Ferdinando I (1549–1609); Grand Duke 1587–1609	Don Giovanni de' Medici (1563–1621)	(Unnamed daughter) (1566–1566)
Eleanor de' Medici (1566–1611) m. Vincenzo I Gonzaga	Anna de' Medici (1569–1584)	Lucrezia de' Medici (1572–1574)	Antonio de' Medici (1576–1621)	Eleanor de' Medici (1591–1617)	Francesco de' Medici (1594–1614)	Filippino de' Medici (1599–1602)	Maria Maddalena de' Medici (1600–1633)	Charles II of Austria (1540–1590)
Romola de' Medici (1568–1568)	Isabella de' Medici (1571–1572)	Marie de' Medici (1575–1642) m. Henry IV of France	Philip de' Medici (1577–1582)	Caterina de' Medici (1593–1629) m. Ferdinando I Gonzaga	Carlo de' Medici (1595–1666); Cardinal Bishop of Ostia	Lorenzo de' Medici (1600–1648)
Christine Marie of France (1606–1663) m. Victor Amadeus I of Savoy	Louis XIII of France (1601–r.1610–1643)	Gaston of Orléans (1608–1660)	Cosimo II (1590–1621); Grand Duke 1609–21	Maria Magdalena of Austria (1589–1631)	Federico della Rovere (1605–1625)	Claudia de' Medici (1604–1648)	Leopold V of Austria (1586–1632)	Ferdinand II, Holy Roman Emperor (1578–r.1619–1637)
Maria Cristina de' Medici (1609–1632)	Ferdinando II (1610–1670); Grand Duke 1621–70	Vittoria della Rovere (1622–1694)	Gian Carlo de' Medici (1611–1663); Cardinal	Margherita de' Medici (1612–1679) m. Odoardo Farnese	Matteo de' Medici (1613–1667)	Francesco de' Medici (1614–1634)	Anna de' Medici (1616–1676)	Ferdinand Charles of Austria (1628–1662)	Leopoldo de' Medici (1617–1675); Cardinal
Cosimo de' Medici (1639–1639)	Cosimo III (1642–1723); Grand Duke 1670–1723	Marguerite Louise d'Orléans (1645–1721)	Francesco Maria de' Medici (1660–1711); Cardinal	Philip William, Elector Palatine (1615–1690)
Violante of Bavaria; 1673–1731)	Ferdinando (III) de' Medici (1663–1713)	Anna Maria Luisa de' Medici (1667–1743)	Johann Wilhelm, Elector Palatine (1658–1716)	Philip William August, Count Palatine of Neuburg (1668–1693)	Anna Maria Franziska of Saxe-Lauenburg (1673–1741)	Gian Gastone (1671–1737); Grand Duke 1723–37

== Structure of the family tree lines ==
Principal branch
Branch of Gragnano (precise connection unknown)
Bonino di Filippo	Bernardo di Giambuono	Conte di Averardo	Salvestro di Averardo	Vieri di Cambio	Salvestro di Alemanno	Francesco di Giovenco	Castellina; Tornaquinci	Branch of Ottajano	Peruzzi de' Medici
Branch of Cafaggiolo	Branch of Popolano (Trebbio)
Grand Ducal; Branch; 1562–1737

== The descendants line ==
=== Origins ===
Medico di Potrone; *1046 ? †1102
Bono; *1069 ? †1123
Bernardo; *1099 ? †1147
Giambuono de' Medici; *1131 ? †1192
Chiarissimo; *1167 ? †1210	Bonagiunta *? †1226
descendants to 15th century
Filippo *? †?
Chiarissimo fl. 1253	Ranieri *? †?	Averardo I fl. 1280
Filippo *? †1290	Ugolino *? †1301	Giambuono; *1260 †?	Averardo II; *1270 †1319
Arrigo *? †1348	Bonino fl. 1312	Cambio *? †~1356	Alamanno *? †1355	Bernardo fl. 1322	Lippo fl. 1306	Giovenco *? †1320	Conte fl. 1330	Salvestro *? †1346
descendants to 17th century	descendants to 18th century	descendants to 14th or 15th century
Vieri; *1323 †1395	Salvestro; *1331 ? †1388	Francesco *? †?	Giuliano I *? †1377	Salvestro di Averardo
descendants to 18th century	descendants to 17th century	descendants to 18th century
Antonio *? †?	Giuliano II *? †?
Giovenco *? †1447	Bernardetto; *1393 †1465?	Giuliano *? †?	Pietro *? †?	Giovanni *? †1475?	Castellina Tornaquinci
descendants to 20th century
Pierangelo *? †1464	Giovenco *? †1464?	Antonio fl. 1493	Domenico *? †?	Averardo fl. 1513	Francesco *? †?	Lorenzo fl. 1490	Giovenco *? †?
Francesco *? †?	Bernardo *? †?	Giovanni *? †?	Raffaele *? †?	Bernardetto *? †?	Galeotto *? †1528	Francesco *? †?	Ottaviano; *1482 †1546
Averardo; *1518 †1601	Giulio *? †?	Nicolò * †1562	Lorenzo * †1568	Francesco; *1519 †1584	Bernardetto *? † after 1579	Alessandro; Pope Leo XI; *1535 †1605
Ottaviano; *1555 †1625	Giulio *? †?	Leone * †1596	Galeotto *? †?	Cosimo *? †?	Alessandro *? †1606
Giulio *? †1626	Raffaele *? †1624	Nicolò *? †?	Francesco; *1585 †1664	Ottaviano *? †?	Bernardo *? †?
Leone *? †1650	Averardo *? †1685	Giulio *? †1614	Maria; *1632 †1689	Giuseppe; *1635 †1717
Filippo *? †1749	Francesco *? †1722	Pierpaolo fl. 1737	Francesco *? †1766	Nicolò Giuseppe *? †?	Ottaviano; *1660 †1710	Andrea *? †1684
Leone fl. 1759	Averardo *? †1808	Filippo fl. 1775	Giuseppe; *1688 †1743
Filippo *? †1821	Nicola *? †?	Anna Maria Luisa; *1756 †1797	Bindo Simone Peruzzi; *1729 †1794	Pierpaolo *? †?	Michele *? †1770
Bindo Giovan Battista; *1784 †?	Vincenzo; *1789 †1847	Simone *? †?	Giuseppe; *1748 †1793	Luigi; *1759 †1830
Rodolfo; *1831 †1905	Simone; *1832 †1900	Ubaldino; *1822 †1891	Michele; *1771 †1832	Marino; *1774 †1835	Alessandro; *1777 †1843
Bindo; *1877 †1907	Ridolfo; *1883 †?	Giuseppe; *1803 †1874	Francesco; *1808 †1857	Luigi; *1815 †1865	Goffredo; *1822 †1886	Giuliano; *1826 †?
Alessandro *? †?	Michele; *1823 †1882	Alberto Marino; *1854 †1925	Alessandro; *1863 †?	Edoardo; *1857 †1938
Giuseppe; *1843 †1894	Armando; *1901 †1983	Alessandro; *1890 †1944	Paolo; *1896 †1973
Giovanni Battista; *1939 †2015	Cosimo; *1929 †1981
Giuliano; *1974	Lorenzo	Alessandro	Ottaviano; *1957	Paolo
Cosimo Maria	Guglielmo Ottaviano

=== Branch of Salvestro di Averardo ===
Origins
Averardo; *1310 †1363
Giovanni; *1360 †1429	Francesco †1402
Cosimo; *1389 †1464	Lorenzo; *1394 †1440	Malatesta †1406	Averardo; *1373 †1435
Cafaggiolo	Popolano (Trebbio)	Mariotto; *1418 †?	Giuliano; *1396 †1467	Matteo; *1413 †?
Francesco; *1415

=== Branch of Cafaggiolo ===
Salvestro di Averardo
Cosimo; *1389 †1464
Piero; *1416 †1469	Giovanni; *1421 †1463	Carlo; *1428 †1492
Giovanni ante *1444 †?	Lorenzo; *1449 †1492	Giuliano; *1453 †1478
Lucrezia; *1470 †1553	Piero; *1472 †1503	Giovanni; *1475 †1521	Giuliano; *1479 †1516	Giulio; *1478 †1534
Lorenzo; *1492 †1519	Ippolito; *1511 †1535
Alessandro; *1510 †1537	Caterina; *1519 †1589	Asdrubale †1565
Giulio; *1527 †1600
Cosimo; *1550 ca. †1630 ca.	Giuliano *? †?

=== Branch of Popolano (Trebbio)/Grand Ducal Branch ===
Salvestro di Averardo
Lorenzo; *1394 †1440
Francesco *? †?	Pierfrancesco; *1430 †1476
Lorenzo; *1463 †1503	Giovanni; *1467 †1498
Pierfrancesco; *1487 †1525	Averardo *? †?	Vincenzo *? †?	Giovanni; *1498 †1526
Lorenzino; *1514 †1548	Giuliano; *1520 †1588	COSIMO I *1519 †1574
FRANCESCO I *1541 †1587	Giovanni; *1543 †1562	FERDINANDO I *1549 †1609	Pietro; *1554 †1604	Giovanni; *1567 †1621
Filippo; *1577 †1582	COSIMO II; *1590 †1621	Francesco; *1594 †1614	Carlo; *1595 †1666	Lorenzo; *1599 †1648	Pietro; *1592 †1654	Cosimo *? †?	Gianfrancesco Maria; *1619 †1689
FERDINANDO II; *1610 †1670	Gian Carlo; *1611 †1663	Mattias; *1613 †1667	Leopoldo; *1617 †1675
COSIMO III; *1642 †1723	Francesco Maria; *1660 †1711
Ferdinando; *1663 †1713	GIAN GASTONE; *1671 †1737

== Cornerstone figures of the line of succession ==
Name	Portrait	Note
Cosimo The Elder; *1389 †1464		Pater patriæ First Lord of Florence de facto
Lorenzo The Magnificent; *1449 †1492		Nature will no longer create such a man — Caterina Sforza, Lady of Imola, as soon as she learned of the death of Lorenzo
Pope Leo X *1475 †1521		217th pope of the Catholic Church
Pope Clement VII; *1478 †1534		219th pope of the Catholic Church
Giovanni delle Bande Nere; *1498 †1526		The last Condottiero of free company and father of Cosimo I first Grand Duke of Tuscany
Alessandro The Moor; *1510 †1537		Last descendant of the House of Medici's main branch to rule Florence; Last Lord and first Duke of Florence
Catherine de' Medici; *1519 †1589		Queen consort of France between 1547 and 1559
Cosimo I *1519 †1574		First Grand Duke of Tuscany
Pope Leo XI; *1535 †1605		232nd pope of the Catholic Church
Marie de' Medici; *1575 †1642		Queen consort of France between 1600 and 1610

== Places ==
- Medici villas
- Villa del Trebbio
- Villa di Castello
- Santi Severino e Sossio, Naples

== See also ==
- History of Florence

Royal House House of Medici
New title	Ruling house of the Duchy of Florence; 1533–69	Elevated to Grand Dukes of Tuscany
New title Elevated from Duchy of Florence	Ruling house of the Grand Duchy of Tuscany; 1569–1737	Succeeded by House of Lorraine
