= Ottaviano de' Medici (born 1957) =

Italian noble and entrepreneur

Prince Ottaviano de' Medici di Toscana di Ottajano (b. 1957) is an Italian noble and member of the Ottajano branch of the House of Medici. He is the president of the Associazione Internationale Medicae (International Medici Association) and one of the founders of Save Florence, an initiative to conserve the cultural heritage of the city of Florence.

== Family origins ==
Ottaviano's branch of the House of Medici is descended from Ottaviano de' Medici (Gonfaloniere di Giustizia) and his wife Francesca Salviati, parents of Pope Leo XI.

== Marriage and issue ==
- Cosimo Maria de' Medici - born in 1991;
- Guglielmo de' Medici - born in 1992;
- Lorenzo de' Medici - born in 2009.

== Published works ==
- Ottaviano de' Medici di Toscana di Ottajano, Storia della mia dinastia, Polistampa 2001.

== See also ==
- Princes of Ottajano
- Ottaviano de' Medici
- Genealogical tables of the House of Medici
- History of Florence
