= House of Medici =

Italian banking family and political dynasty

Medici
- Noble house
- Arms of the House of Medici; Blazon: Or, five balls in orle gules, in chief a larger one of the arms of France (viz. Azure, three fleurs-de-lis or), the incorporation of the arms of France being granted by Louis XI in 1465
- Country: Republic of Florence; Grand Duchy of Tuscany; Papal States; Duchy of Urbino
- Etymology: By Medico, Castellan of Potrone, considered the first ancestor of the house
- Origin: Mugello, Tuscia (present-day Tuscany)
- Founded: 1230; 796 years ago
- Founder: Giambuono de' Medici
- Final ruler: Gian Gastone de' Medici
- Final head: Anna Maria Luisa de' Medici
- Titles: Pope (non-hereditary); Queen of France; Grand Duke of Tuscany; Duke of Florence; Lord of Florence (informal); Duke of Urbino; Duke of Nemours; Prince of Ottajano
- Members: Giovanni di Bicci de' Medici; Cosimo de' Medici; Lorenzo de' Medici; Pope Leo X; Pope Clement VII; Pope Leo XI; Catherine de' Medici; Cosimo I de' Medici; Marie de' Medici
- Distinctions: Order of Saint Stephen
- Traditions: Catholicism
- Motto: Festina lente ("make haste slowly")
- Heirlooms: List: Medici Bank (1397–1494); Grand Ducal Crown of Tuscany; Medici Vase; Medici porcelain
- Estates: Palazzo Vecchio; Palazzo Pitti; Palazzo Medici Riccardi; Several villas in Tuscany
- Dissolution: 1743 (original line)
- Cadet branches: 14 cadet branches; 2 extant List: De' Medici of Ottajano; De' Medici Tornaquinci of Castellina

The House of Medici (English: /ˈmɛdɪtʃi/ MED-itch-ee, UK also /məˈdiːtʃi/ mə-DEE-chee; Italian: [ˈmɛːditʃi]) was an Italian banking family and political dynasty that first consolidated power in the Republic of Florence under Cosimo de' Medici and his grandson Lorenzo "the Magnificent" during the first half of the 15th century. The family originated in the Mugello region of Tuscany, and prospered gradually in trade until it was able to fund the Medici Bank. This bank was the largest in Europe in the 15th century and facilitated the Medicis' rise to political power in Florence, although they officially remained citizens rather than monarchs until the 16th century.

In 1532, the family acquired the hereditary title Duke of Florence. In 1569, the duchy was elevated to the Grand Duchy of Tuscany after territorial expansion. The Medici ruled the Grand Duchy from its inception under the builder Cosimo I until 1737, with the death of Gian Gastone de' Medici. The Medici produced four popes of the Catholic Church—Pope Leo X (1513–1521), Pope Clement VII (1523–1534), Pope Pius IV (1559–1565) and Pope Leo XI (1605)—and two queens of France—Catherine de' Medici (1547–1559) and Marie de' Medici (1600–1610). The Medici's grand duchy witnessed degrees of economic growth under the early grand dukes, but was bankrupt by the time of Cosimo III de' Medici (r. 1670–1723).

The Medicis' wealth and influence was initially derived from the textile trade guided by the wool guild of Florence, the Arte della Lana. Like other families ruling in Italian signorie, the Medici dominated their city's government, were able to bring Florence under their family's power, and created an environment in which art and humanism flourished. The Italian Renaissance was inspired by the Medici along with other families of Italy, such as the Visconti and Sforza in Milan, the Este in Ferrara, the Borgia and Della Rovere in Rome, and the Gonzaga in Mantua.

The Medici Bank, from when it was created in 1397 to its fall in 1494, was one of the most prosperous and respected institutions in Europe, and the Medici family was considered the wealthiest in Europe for a time. From this base, they acquired political power initially in Florence and later in wider Italy and Europe. They were among the earliest businesses to use the general ledger system of accounting through the development of the double-entry bookkeeping system for tracking credits and debits.

The Medici family financed the construction of Saint Peter's Basilica and Florence Cathedral, and were patrons of Donatello, Brunelleschi, Botticelli, Leonardo da Vinci, Michelangelo, Raphael, Machiavelli, Galileo, and Francesco Redi, among many others in the arts and sciences. They funded the invention of the piano, and arguably that of opera. They were also protagonists of the Counter-Reformation, from the beginning of the Reformation through the Council of Trent and the French Wars of Religion.

== History ==
=== 13th century ===
The Medici family came from the agricultural Mugello region north of Florence, and they are first mentioned in a document of 1230. The origin of the name is uncertain. Medici is the plural of medico, meaning "medical doctor".

In 1293, the Ordinances of Justice were enacted; effectively, they became the constitution of the Republic of Florence throughout the Italian Renaissance.

For most of the 13th century, the leading banking centre in Italy was Siena. In 1298, however, as the century came to a close, one of the leading banking families of Europe, the Bonsignoris, went bankrupt, and the city of Siena lost its status as the banking centre of Italy to Florence.

=== 14th century ===
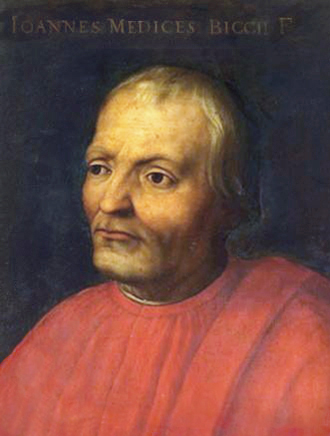
Giovanni di Bicci de' Medici, founder of the Medici bank

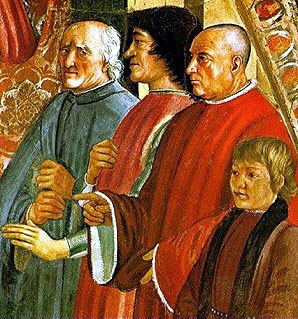
The Confirmation of the Rule, by Domenico Ghirlandaio

Members of the Medici family rose to some prominence in the early 14th century in the wool trade, especially with France and Spain. Despite the presence of some Medici in the city's government institutions, they were still far less notable than other outstanding families such as the Albizzi or the Strozzi. Salvestro de' Medici was speaker of the woolmakers' guild during the Ciompi revolt of 1378–1382, and Antonio de' Medici was exiled from Florence in 1396. Involvement in another plot in 1400 caused all branches of the family to be banned from Florentine politics for twenty years, with the exception of two.

In 1397, late in the 14th century, the Medici dynasty began with the founding of the Medici Bank in Florence. Giovanni di Bicci de' Medici (c. 1360–1429), son of Averardo de' Medici (1320–1363), increased the wealth of the family through the creation of the Medici Bank, and he became one of the richest men in the city of Florence. Although he never held any political office, he gained popular support for the family through his backing for the introduction of a proportional system of taxation. Giovanni's son Cosimo the Elder, Pater Patriae (father of the country), took over in 1434 as gran maestro (the unofficial head of the Florentine Republic).

==== Rise to power ====
Until the late 14th century, the leading family of Florence was the House of Albizzi. The city's numerous luxurious palazzi were becoming surrounded by townhouses built by the prospering merchant class.

The main challengers to the Albizzi family were the Medici, first under Giovanni di Bicci de' Medici, later under his son Cosimo di Giovanni de' Medici and great-grandson, Lorenzo de' Medici. The Medici controlled the Medici Bank—then Europe's largest bank—and an array of other enterprises in Florence and elsewhere.

The Medici family was connected to most other elite families of the time through marriages of convenience, partnerships, or employment, so the family had a central position in the social network: several families had systematic access to the rest of the elite families only through the Medici, perhaps similar to banking relationships. Some examples of these families include the Bardi, Altoviti, Ridolfi, Zurla, Cavalcanti and the Tornabuoni. This has been suggested as a reason for the rise of the Medici family.

=== 15th century ===
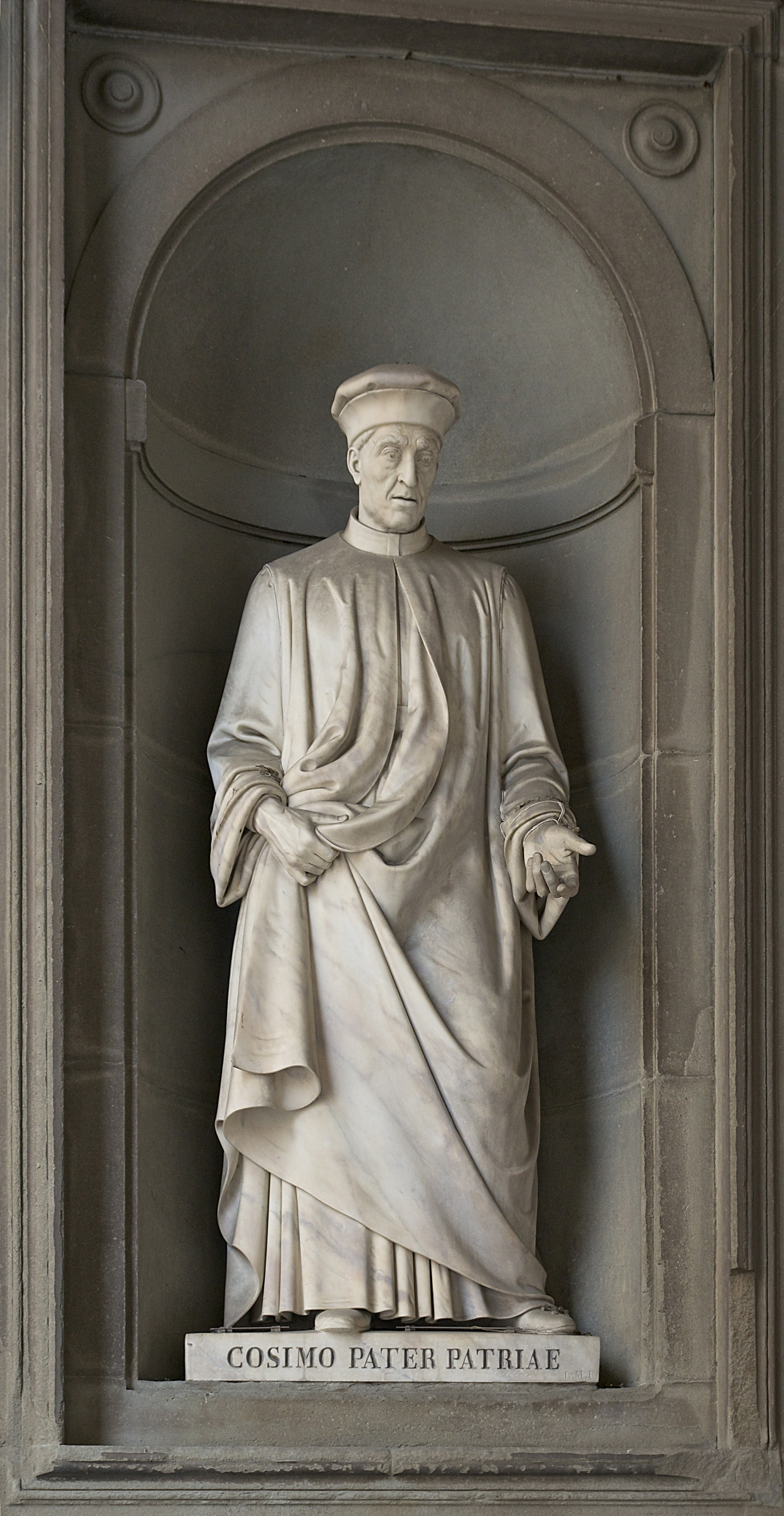
Cosimo, Pater patriae, Uffizi Gallery, Florence

In 1433, the Medici benefited from the discovery of vast deposits of alum in Tolfa. Alum is essential as a mordant in the dyeing of certain cloths and was used extensively in Florence, where the main industry was textile manufacturing. Before the Medici, the only exporters of alum were Ottoman merchants, so Europe was forced to buy from them until the discovery in Tolfa. Pius II granted the Medici family a monopoly on the mining there, making them the primary producers of alum in Europe.

In 1433, the Albizzi managed to have Cosimo exiled.

The next year, however, in 1434, a pro-Medici signoria, led by Tommaso Soderini, Oddo Altoviti, and Lucca Pitti, was elected and Cosimo returned. The Medici became the city's leading family, a position they would hold for the next three centuries. Florence remained a republic until 1537, traditionally marking the end of the High Renaissance in Florence, but the instruments of republican government were firmly under the control of the Medici and their allies, save during intervals after 1494 and 1527. Cosimo and Lorenzo rarely held official posts but were the unquestioned leaders.

Three successive generations of the Medici—Cosimo, Piero, and Lorenzo—ruled over Florence through the greater part of the 15th century. They clearly dominated Florentine representative government without abolishing it altogether. These three members of the Medici family had great skills in the management of so "restive and independent a city" as Florence. When Lorenzo died in 1492, however, his son Piero proved quite incapable of responding successfully to challenges caused by the French invasion of Italy in 1492, and within two years, he and his supporters were forced into exile and replaced with a republican government.

Piero de' Medici (1416–1469), Cosimo's son, was in power for five years (1464–69). He was called "Piero the Gouty" because of the gout that pained his foot and led to his death. Unlike his father, Piero had little interest in the arts. Due to his illness, he often stayed at home bedridden.

Lorenzo de' Medici (1449–1492), called "the Magnificent", was more capable of leading and ruling a city, but he neglected the family banking business, which led to its ultimate ruin. To ensure the continuance of his family's success, Lorenzo planned his children's future careers for them. He groomed the headstrong Piero II to follow as his successor in civil leadership; Giovanni (future Pope Leo X) was placed in the church at an early age; and his daughter Maddalena was provided with a sumptuous dowry to make a politically advantageous marriage to a son of Pope Innocent VIII that cemented the alliance between the Medici and the Roman branches of the Cybo and Altoviti families.

The Pazzi conspiracy of 1478 was an attempt to depose the Medici family by killing Lorenzo with his younger brother Giuliano during Easter services; the assassination attempt ended with the death of Giuliano and an injured Lorenzo. The conspiracy involved the Pazzi and Salviati families, both rival banking families seeking to end the influence of the Medici, as well as the priest presiding over the church services, the Archbishop of Pisa, and even Pope Sixtus IV to a degree. The conspirators approached Sixtus IV in the hopes of gaining his approval, as he and the Medici had a long rivalry themselves, but the pope gave no official sanction to the plan. Despite his refusal of official approval, the pope nonetheless allowed the plot to proceed without interfering, and, after the failed assassination of Lorenzo, also gave dispensation for crimes done in the service of the church. After this, Lorenzo adopted his brother's illegitimate son Giulio de' Medici (1478–1535), the future Pope Clement VII. Lorenzo's son Piero II took over as the head of Florence after Lorenzo's death. The Medici were expelled from Florence from 1494 to 1512 after Piero acceded to all of the demands of invader Charles VIII of France.

In the dangerous circumstances in which our city is placed, the time for deliberation is past. Action must be taken... I have decided, with your approval, to sail for Naples immediately, believing that as I am the person against whom the activities of our enemies are chiefly directed, I may, perhaps, by delivering myself into their hands, be the means of restoring peace to our fellow-citizens. As I have had more honour and responsibility among you than any private citizen has had in our day, I am more bound than any other person to serve our country, even at the risk of my life. With this intention I now go. Perhaps God wills that this war, which began in the blood of my brother and of myself, should be ended by any means. My desire is that by my life or my death, my misfortune or my prosperity, I may contribute to the welfare of our city... I go full of hope, praying to God to give me grace to perform what every citizen should at all times be ready to perform for his country.

— Lorenzo de' Medici, 1479

=== 16th century ===
The exile of the Medici lasted until 1512, after which the "senior" branch of the family—those descended from Cosimo the Elder—were able to rule until the assassination of Alessandro de' Medici, first Duke of Florence, in 1537. This century-long rule was interrupted only on two occasions (between 1494–1512 and 1527–1530), when anti-Medici factions took control of Florence. Following the assassination of Duke Alessandro, power passed to the "junior" Medici branch—those descended from Lorenzo the Elder, the youngest son of Giovanni di Bicci, starting with his great-great-grandson Cosimo I "the Great".

Cosimo the Elder and his father started the Medici foundations in banking and manufacturing—including a form of franchises. The family's influence grew with its patronage of wealth, art, and culture. Ultimately, it reached its zenith in the papacy and continued to flourish for centuries afterward as Dukes of Florence and Tuscany. At least half, probably more, of Florence's people were employed by the Medici and their foundational branches in business.

==== Medici popes ====
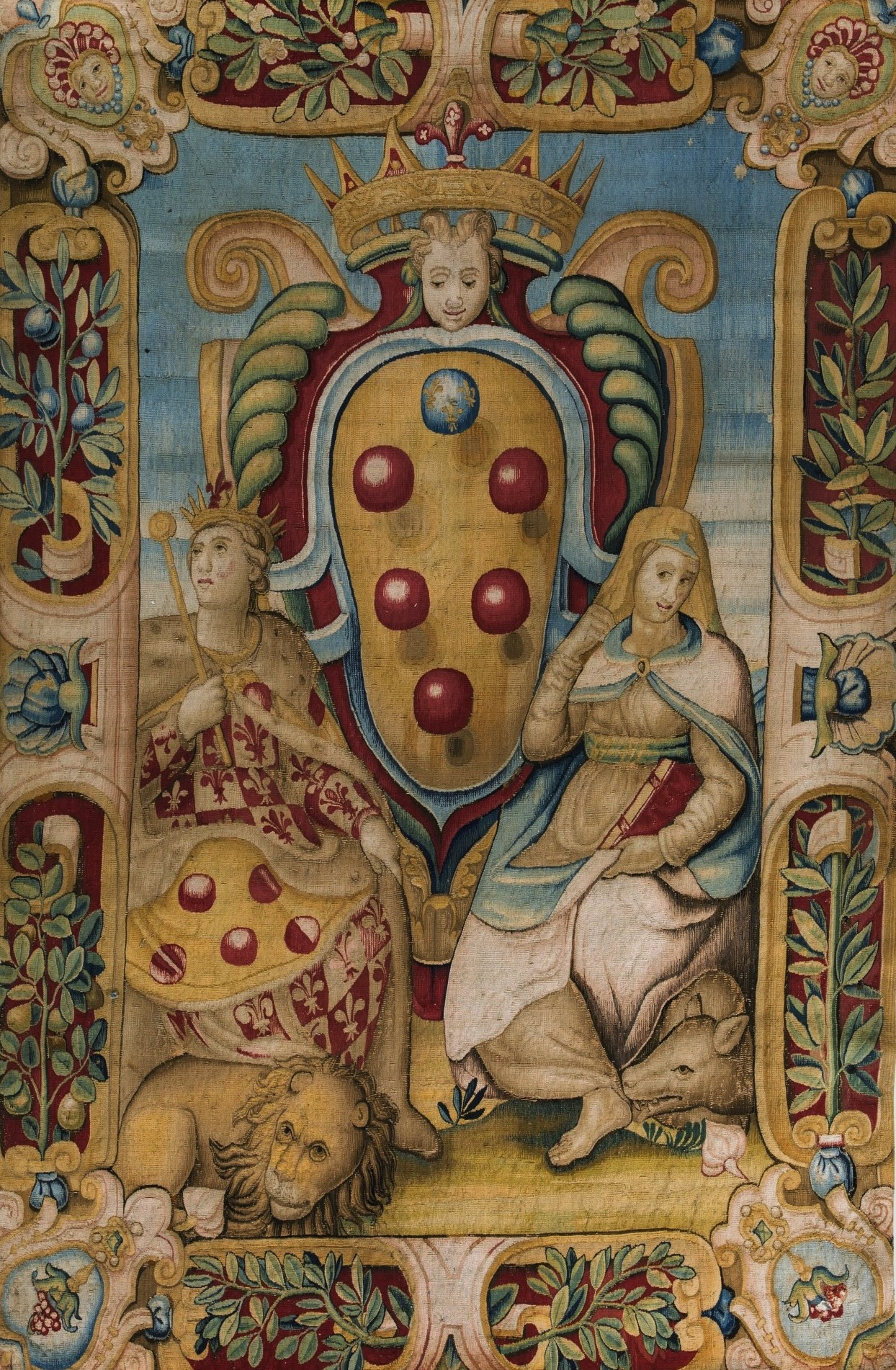
The Medici Wedding Tapestry (1589)

The Medici briefly became leaders of Western Christendom through their two famous 16th century popes, Leo X and Clement VII. Both also served as de facto political rulers of Rome, Florence, and large swaths of Italy known as the Papal States. They were generous patrons of the arts who commissioned masterpieces such as Raphael's Transfiguration and Michelangelo's The Last Judgment; however, their reigns coincided with troubles for the Vatican, including Martin Luther's Protestant Reformation and the infamous sack of Rome in 1527.

Leo X's pontificate bankrupted Vatican coffers and accrued massive debts. From Leo's election as pope in 1513 to his death in 1521, Florence was overseen, in turn, by Giuliano de' Medici, Duke of Nemours, Lorenzo de' Medici, Duke of Urbino, and Giulio de' Medici, the latter of whom became Pope Clement VII.

Clement VII's tumultuous pontificate was dominated by a rapid succession of political crises—many long in the making—that resulted in the sack of Rome by the armies of Holy Roman Emperor Charles V in 1527 and rise of the Salviati, Altoviti and Strozzi as the leading bankers of the Roman Curia. From the time of Clement's election as pope in 1523 until the sack of Rome, Florence was governed by the young Ippolito de' Medici (future cardinal and vice-chancellor of the Holy Roman Church), Alessandro de' Medici (future duke of Florence), and their guardians. In 1530, after allying himself with Charles V, Pope Clement VII succeeded in securing the engagement of Charles V's daughter Margeret of Austria to his illegitimate nephew (reputedly his son) Alessandro de' Medici. Clement also convinced Charles V to name Alessandro as Duke of Florence. Thus began the reign of Medici monarchs in Florence, which lasted two centuries.

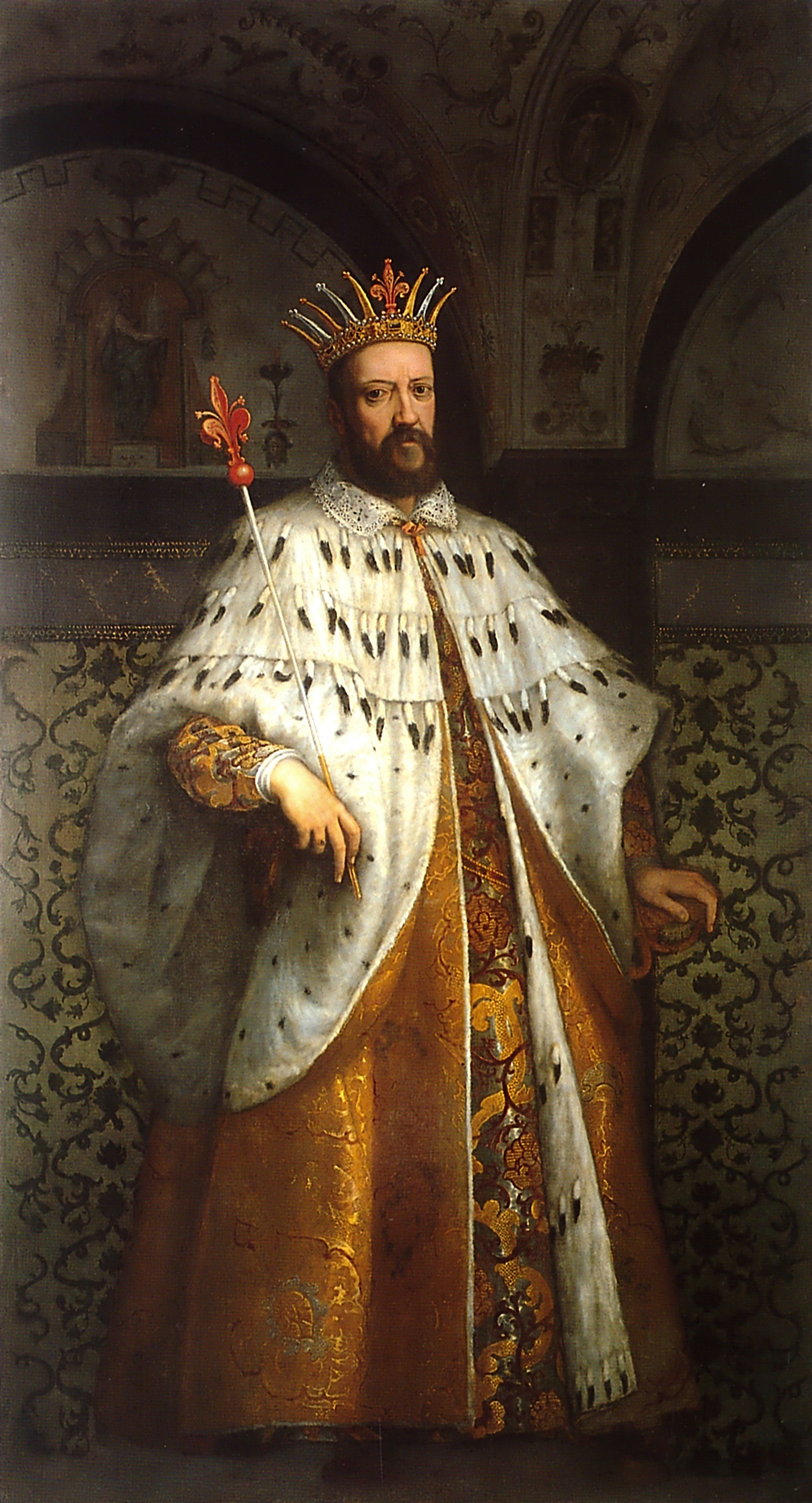
Cosimo I, founder of the Grand Duchy of Tuscany

After securing Alessandro de' Medici's dukedom, Pope Clement VII married off his first cousin, twice removed, Catherine de' Medici, to the son of Emperor Charles V's arch-enemy, King Francis I of France—the future King Henry II. This led to the transfer of Medici blood, through Catherine's daughters, to the royal family of Spain through Elisabeth of Valois, and the House of Lorraine through Claude of Valois.

In 1534, following a lengthy illness, Pope Clement VII died—and with him the stability of the Medici's "senior" branch. In 1535, Ippolito Cardinal de' Medici died under mysterious circumstances. In 1536, Alessandro de' Medici married Charles V's daughter, Margaret of Austria; however, the following year he was assassinated by a resentful cousin, Lorenzino de' Medici. The deaths of Alessandro and Ippolito enabled the Medici's "junior" branch to lead Florence.

==== Medici dukes ====
Another outstanding figure of the 16th-century Medici family was Cosimo I, who rose from relatively modest beginnings in the Mugello to attain supremacy over the whole of Tuscany. Against the opposition of Catherine de' Medici, Pope Paul III and their allies, he prevailed in various battles to conquer Florence's hated rival Siena and found the Grand Duchy of Tuscany. Cosimo purchased a portion of the island of Elba from the Republic of Genoa and based the Tuscan navy there. He died in 1574, succeeded by his eldest surviving son Francesco, whose death without male heirs led to the succession of his younger brother, Ferdinando, in 1587. Francesco married Johanna of Austria, and with his consort produced Eleonora de' Medici, Duchess of Mantua, and Marie de' Medici, Queen of France and Navarre. Through Marie, all succeeding French monarchs (bar the Napoleons) were descended from Francesco.

Ferdinando eagerly assumed the government of Tuscany. He commanded the draining of the Tuscan marshlands, built a road network in southern Tuscany and cultivated trade in Livorno. To augment the Tuscan silk industry, he oversaw the planting of mulberry trees along the major roads (silk worms feed on mulberry leaves). In foreign affairs, he shifted Tuscany away from Habsburg hegemony by marrying the first non-Habsburg marriage candidate since Alessandro, Christina of Lorraine, a granddaughter of Catherine de' Medici. The Spanish reaction was to construct a citadel on their portion of the island of Elba. To strengthen the new Franco-Tuscan alliance, he married his niece, Marie, to Henry IV of France. Henry explicitly stated that he would defend Tuscany from Spanish aggression, but later reneged, after which Ferdinando was forced to marry his heir, Cosimo, to Maria Maddalena of Austria to assuage Spain (where Maria Maddalena's sister Margaret was the incumbent Queen consort). Ferdinando also sponsored a Tuscan expedition to the New World with the intention of establishing a Tuscan colony, an enterprise that brought no result for permanent colonial acquisitions.

Despite all of these incentives for economic growth and prosperity, the population of Florence at the dawn of the 17th century was a mere 75,000, far smaller than the other capitals of Italy (i.e., Rome, Milan, Venice, Palermo, and Naples). Francesco and Ferdinando, due to lax distinction between Medici and Tuscan state property, are thought to have been wealthier than their ancestor, Cosimo de' Medici, the founder of the dynasty. The Grand Duke alone had the prerogative to exploit the state's mineral and salt resources, and the fortunes of the Medici were directly tied to the Tuscan economy.

=== 17th century ===
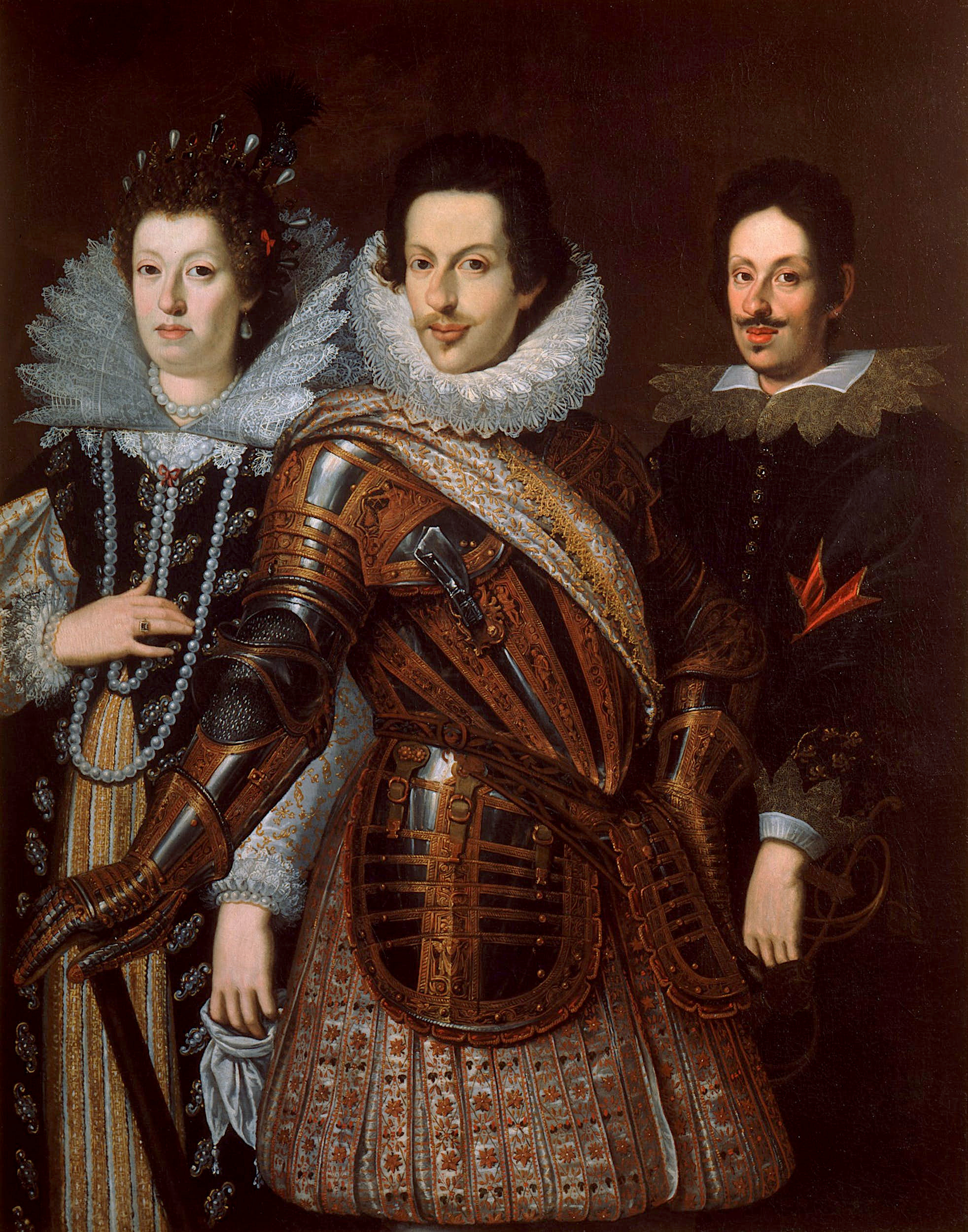
From left to right: The Grand Duchess Maria Maddalena, The Grand Duke Cosimo II, and their elder son, the future Ferdinando II

Ferdinando, although no longer a cardinal, exercised much influence at successive conclaves. In 1605, Ferdinando succeeded in getting his candidate, Alessandro de' Medici, elected Pope Leo XI. He died the same month, but his successor, Pope Paul V, was also pro-Medici. Ferdinando's pro-papal foreign policy, however, had drawbacks. Tuscany was overrun with religious orders, not all of whom were obliged to pay taxes. Ferdinando died in 1609, leaving an affluent realm; his inaction in international affairs, however, would have long-reaching consequences down the line.

In France, Marie de' Medici was acting as regent for her son, Louis XIII. Louis repudiated her pro-Habsburg policy in 1617. She lived the rest of her life deprived of any political influence.

Ferdinando's successor, Cosimo II, reigned for less than 12 years. He married Maria Maddalena of Austria, with whom he had his eight children, including Margherita de' Medici, Ferdinando II de' Medici, and an Anna de' Medici. He is most remembered as the patron of astronomer Galileo Galilei, whose 1610 treatise, Sidereus Nuncius, was dedicated to him. Cosimo died of consumption (tuberculosis) in 1621.

Cosimo's elder son, Ferdinando, was not yet of legal maturity to succeed him, thus Maria Maddalena and his grandmother, Christina of Lorraine, acted as regents. Their collective regency is known as the Turtici. Maria Maddelana's temperament was analogous to Christina's, and together they aligned Tuscany with the papacy, re-doubled the Tuscan clergy, and allowed the heresy trial of Galileo Galilei to occur. Upon the death of the last Duke of Urbino (Francesco Maria II), instead of claiming the duchy for Ferdinando, who was married to the Duke of Urbino's granddaughter and heiress, Vittoria della Rovere, they permitted it to be annexed by Pope Urban VIII. In 1626, they banned any Tuscan subject from being educated outside the Grand Duchy, a law later overturned, but resurrected by Maria Maddalena's grandson, Cosimo III. Harold Acton, an Anglo-Italian historian, ascribed the decline of Tuscany to the Turtici regency.

Grand Duke Ferdinado was obsessed with new technology, and had a variety of hygrometers, barometers, thermometers, and telescopes installed in the Palazzo Pitti. In 1657, Leopoldo de' Medici, the Grand Duke's youngest brother, established the Accademia del Cimento, organized to attract scientists to Florence from all over Tuscany for mutual study.

Tuscany participated in the Wars of Castro (the last time Medicean Tuscany proper was involved in a conflict) and inflicted a defeat on the forces of Pope Urban VIII in 1643. The war effort was costly and the treasury so empty because of it that when the Castro mercenaries were paid for, the state could no longer afford to pay interest on government bonds, with the result that the interest rate was lowered by 0.75%. At that time, the economy was so decrepit that barter trade became prevalent in rural market places.

Ferdinando died on 23 May 1670 afflicted by apoplexy and dropsy. He was interred in the Basilica of San Lorenzo, the Medici's necropolis. At the time of his death, the population of the grand duchy was 730,594; the streets were lined with grass and the buildings on the verge of collapse in Pisa.

Ferdinando's marriage to Vittoria della Rovere produced two children: Cosimo III de' Medici, Grand Duke of Tuscany, and Francesco Maria de' Medici, Duke of Rovere and Montefeltro. Upon Vittoria's death in 1694, her allodial possessions, the Duchies of Rovere and Montefeltro, passed to her younger son.

=== 18th century: the fall of the dynasty ===
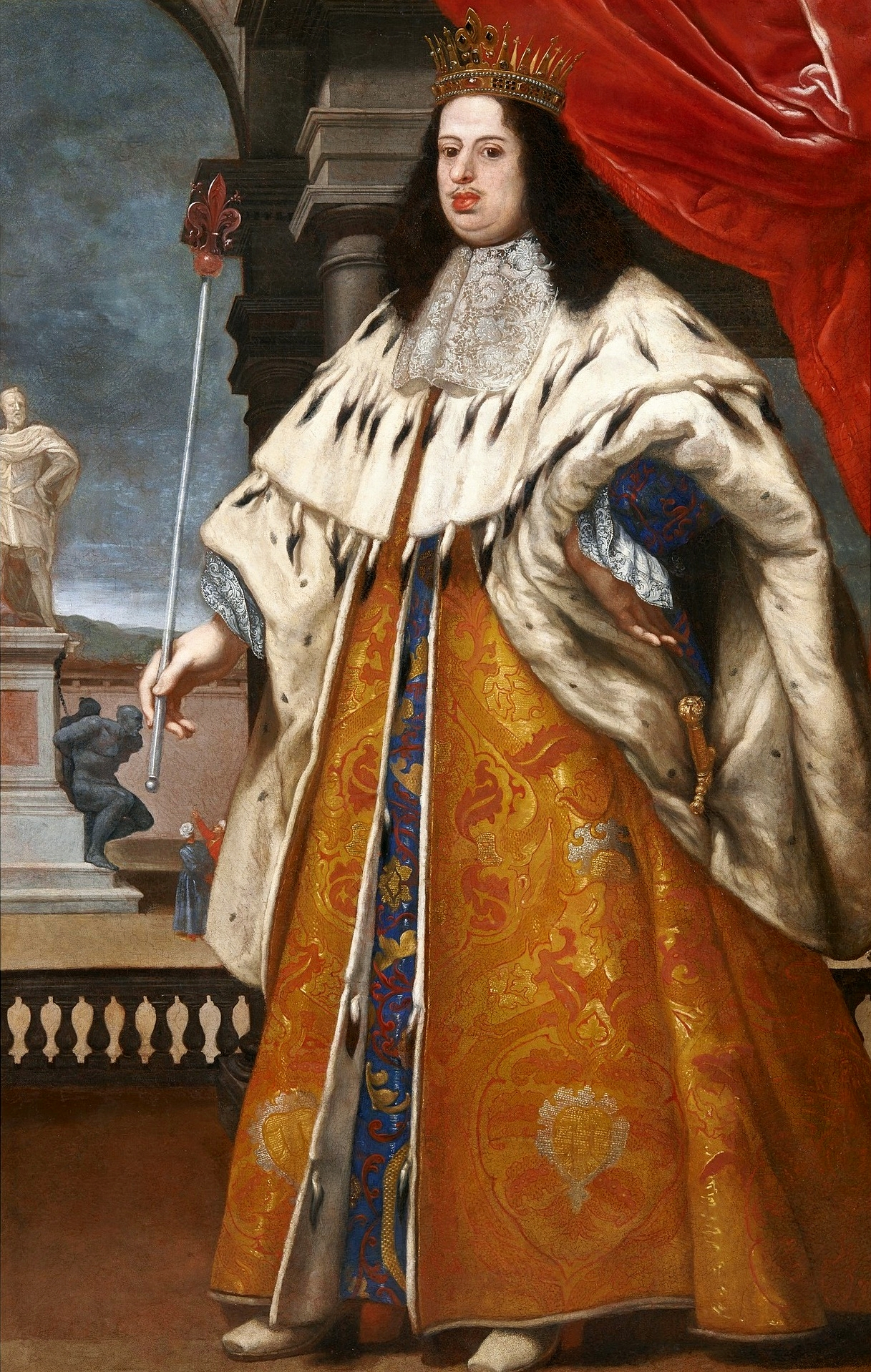
Cosimo III, the Medicean grand duke, in grand ducal regalia

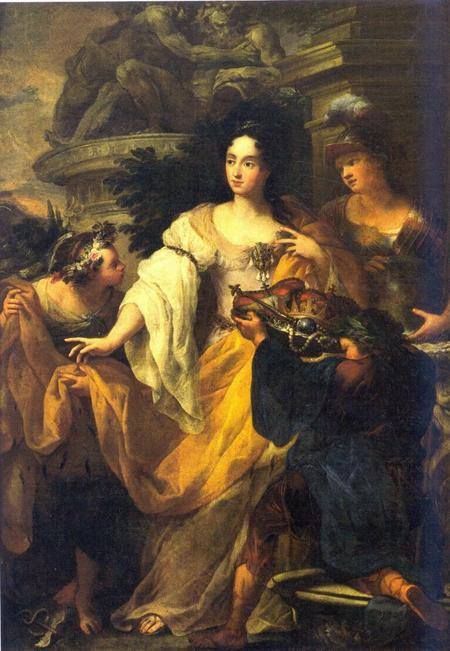
Anna Maria Luisa de' Medici, the last of the grand ducal line, in Minerva, Merkur und Plutus huldigen der Kurfürstin Anna Maria Luisa de' Medici (English: Minerva, Mercury and Pluto pay homage to the Electress Anna Maria Luisa de' Medici) after Antonio Bellucci, 1706

Cosimo III married Marguerite Louise d'Orléans, a granddaughter of Henry IV of France and Marie de' Medici. An exceedingly discontented pairing, this union produced three children, notably Anna Maria Luisa de' Medici, Electress Palatine, and the last Medicean Grand Duke of Tuscany, Gian Gastone de' Medici.

Johann Wilhelm, Elector Palatine, Anna Maria Luisa's spouse, successfully requisitioned the dignity Royal Highness for the Grand Duke and his family in 1691, despite the fact that they had no claim to any kingdom. Cosimo frequently paid the Holy Roman Emperor, his nominal feudal overlord, exorbitant dues, and he sent munitions to the emperor during the Battle of Vienna.

The Medici lacked male heirs, and by 1705, the grand ducal treasury was virtually bankrupt. In comparison to the 17th century, the population of Florence declined by 50%, and the population of the grand duchy as a whole declined by an estimated 40%. Cosimo desperately tried to reach a settlement with the European powers, but Tuscany's legal status was very complicated: the area of the grand duchy formerly comprising the Republic of Siena was technically a Spanish fief, while the territory of the old Republic of Florence was thought to be under imperial suzerainty. Upon the death of his first son, Cosimo contemplated restoring the Florentine republic, either upon Anna Maria Luisa's death, or on his own, if he predeceased her. The restoration of the republic would entail resigning Siena to the Holy Roman Empire, but, regardless, it was vehemently endorsed by his government. Europe largely ignored Cosimo's plan. Only Great Britain and the Dutch Republic gave any credence to it, and the plan ultimately died with Cosimo III in 1723.

On 4 April 1718, Great Britain, France and the Dutch Republic (also later, Austria) selected Don Carlos of Spain, the elder child of Elisabeth Farnese and Philip V of Spain, as the Tuscan heir. By 1722, the electress was not even acknowledged as heiress, and Cosimo was reduced to spectator at the conferences for Tuscany's future. On 25 October 1723, six days before his death, Grand Duke Cosimo disseminated a final proclamation commanding that Tuscany stay independent: Anna Maria Luisa would succeed uninhibited to Tuscany after Gian Gastone, and the grand duke reserved the right to choose his successor. However, these portions of his proclamation were completely ignored, and he died a few days later.

Gian Gastone despised the electress for engineering his catastrophic marriage to Anna Maria Franziska of Saxe-Lauenburg; while she abhorred her brother's liberal policies, he repealed all of his father's anti-Semitic statutes. Gian Gastone revelled in upsetting her. On 25 October 1731, a Spanish detachment occupied Florence on behalf of Don Carlos, who disembarked in Tuscany in December of the same year. The Ruspanti, Gian Gastone's decrepit entourage, loathed the electress, and she them. Duchess Violante of Bavaria, Gian Gastone's sister-in-law, tried to withdraw the grand duke from the sphere of influence of the Ruspanti by organising banquets. His conduct at the banquets was less than regal; he often vomited repeatedly into his napkin, belched, and regaled those present with socially inappropriate jokes. Following a sprained ankle in 1731, he remained confined to his bed for the rest of his life. The bed, often smelling of faeces, was occasionally cleaned by Violante.

In 1736, following the War of the Polish Succession, Don Carlos was disbarred from Tuscany, and Francis III of Lorraine was made heir in his stead. In January 1737, the Spanish troops withdrew from Tuscany, and were replaced by Austrians.

Gian Gastone died on 9 July 1737, surrounded by prelates and his sister. Anna Maria Luisa was offered a nominal regency by the Prince de Craon until the new grand duke could peregrinate to Tuscany, but declined. Upon her brother's death, she received all the House of Medici's allodial possessions.

Anna Maria Luisa signed the Patto di Famiglia ("family pact") on 31 October 1737. In collaboration with the Holy Roman Emperor and Grand Duke Francis of Lorraine, she willed all the personal property of the Medici to the Tuscan state, provided that nothing was ever removed from Florence.

The "Lorrainers", as the occupying forces were called, were popularly loathed, but the regent, the Prince de Craon, allowed the electress to live unperturbed in the Palazzo Pitti. She occupied herself with financing and overseeing the construction of the Basilica of San Lorenzo, started in 1604 by Ferdinando I, at a cost to the state of 1,000 crowns per week.

The electress donated much of her fortune to charity: £4,000 a month. On 19 February 1743, she died, and the grand ducal line of the House of Medici died with her. The Florentines grieved her, and she was interred in the crypt that she helped to complete, San Lorenzo.

The extinction of the main Medici dynasty and the accession in 1737 of Francis Stephen, Duke of Lorraine and husband of Maria Theresa of Austria, led to Tuscany's temporary inclusion in the territories of the Austrian crown. The line of the Princes of Ottajano, an extant branch of the House of Medici who were eligible to inherit the grand duchy of Tuscany when the last male of the senior branch died in 1737, could have carried on as Medici sovereigns but for the intervention of Europe's major powers, which allocated the sovereignty of Florence elsewhere.

As a consequence, the grand duchy expired and the territory became a secundogeniture of the Habsburg-Lorraine dynasty. The first grand duke of the new dynasty, Francis I, was a great-great-great-grandson of Francesco I de' Medici, thus he continued the Medicean Dynasty on the throne of Tuscany through the female line. The Habsburgs were deposed in favor of the House of Bourbon-Parma in 1801 (themselves deposed in 1807), but were later restored at the Congress of Vienna. Tuscany became a province of the United Kingdom of Italy in 1861. However, several extant branches of the House of Medici survive, including the Princes of Ottajano, the Medici Tornaquinci, and the Verona Medici Counts of Caprara and Gavardo. (see Medici family tree)

== Legacy ==
As a preeminent and influential family, the Medici's attracted both considerable controversy and praise from their contemporaries and modern sources. Ferdinand Schevill described there being "an uncommonly wide range" of opinion about the Medicis, with more critical sources from native contemporaries giving way to a more favorable view of the family by nationalists in other countries in later centuries. Machiavelli's The Prince was mixed with its opinions of the Medici, and ultimately came to be dedicated to Lorenzo di Piero de' Medici. Common criticisms of the family have described it as corrupt and with questionable virtues.

=== Artistic patronage ===
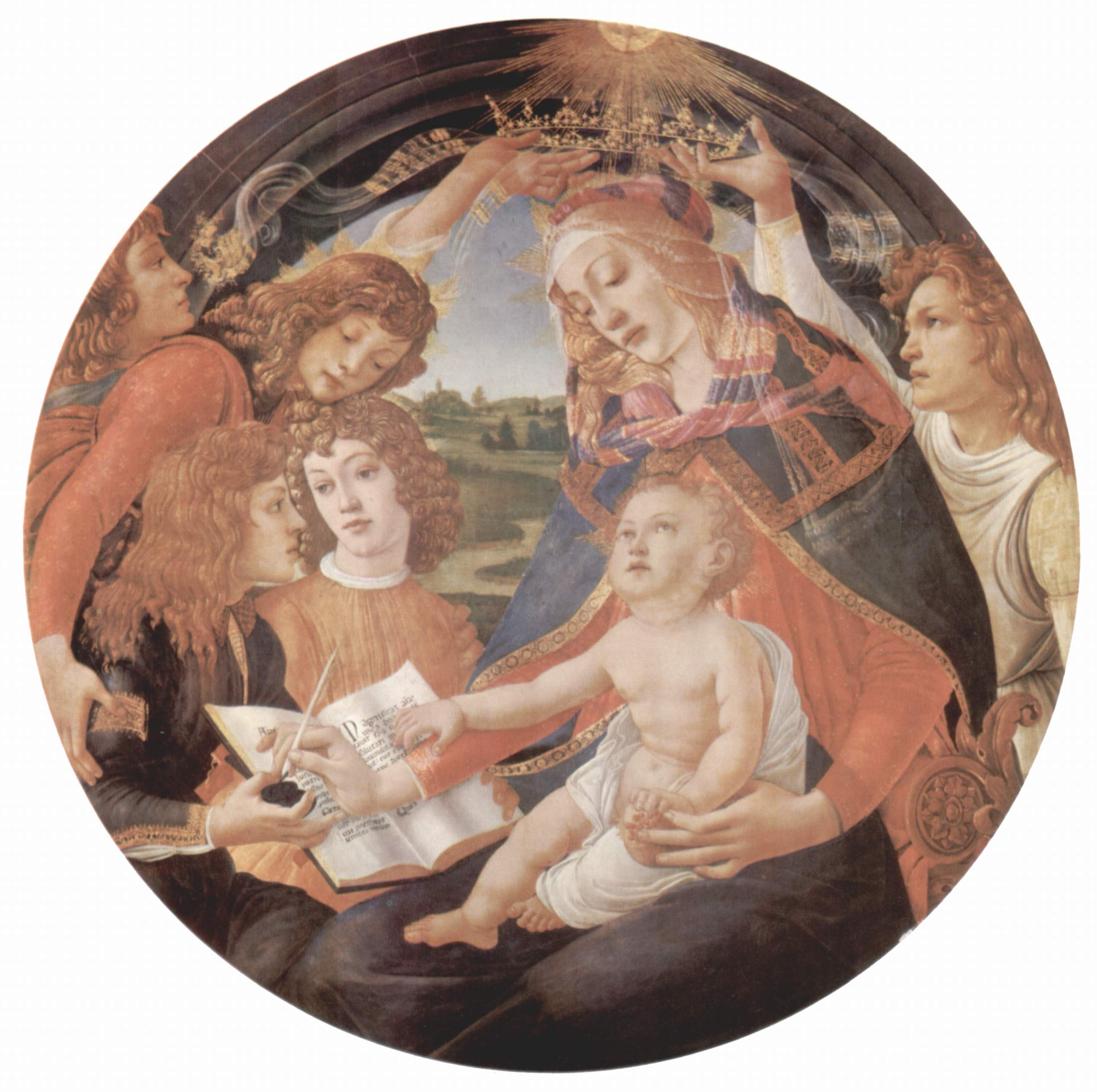
The family of Piero de' Medici portrayed by Sandro Botticelli in the Madonna del Magnificat (c. 1483–1485)

The greatest accomplishments of the Medici were in the sponsorship of art and architecture, mainly early and High Renaissance art and architecture. The Medici were responsible for a high proportion of the major Florentine works of art created during their period of rule. Their support was critical, since artists generally began work on their projects only after they had received commissions. Giovanni di Bicci de' Medici, the first patron of the arts in the family, aided Masaccio and commissioned Filippo Brunelleschi for the reconstruction of the Basilica of San Lorenzo, Florence in 1419. Cosimo the Elder's notable artistic associates were Donatello and Fra Angelico. In later years the most significant protégé of the Medici family was Michelangelo Buonarroti (1475–1564), who produced work for a number of family members, beginning with Lorenzo the Magnificent, who was said to be extremely fond of the young Michelangelo and invited him to study the family collection of antique sculpture. Lorenzo also served as patron to Leonardo da Vinci (1452–1519) for seven years. Indeed, Lorenzo was an artist in his own right and an author of poetry and song; his support of the arts and letters is seen as a high point in Medici patronage.

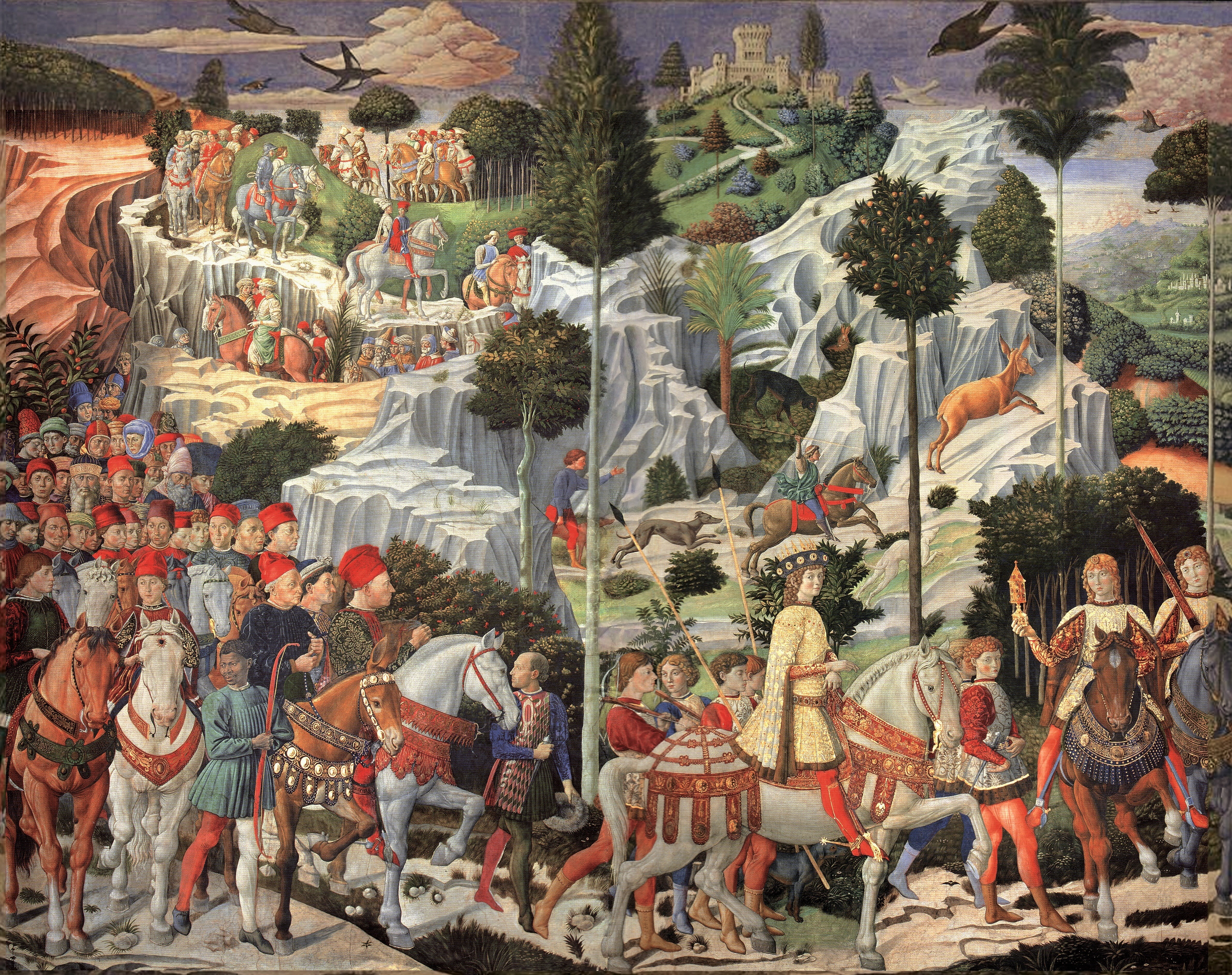
Medici family members placed allegorically in the entourage of a king from the Three Wise Men in the Tuscan countryside in a Benozzo Gozzoli fresco (c. 1459)

After Lorenzo's death the puritanical Dominican friar Girolamo Savonarola rose to prominence, warning Florentines against excessive luxury. Under Savonarola's fanatical leadership many great works were "voluntarily" destroyed in the Bonfire of the Vanities (February 7, 1497). The following year, on 23 May 1498, Savonarola and two young supporters were burned at the stake in the Piazza della Signoria, the same location as his bonfire. In addition to commissions for art and architecture, the Medici were prolific collectors and today their acquisitions form the core of the Uffizi museum in Florence. In architecture, the Medici were responsible for some notable features of Florence, including the Uffizi Gallery, the Boboli Gardens, the Belvedere, the Medici Chapel and the Palazzo Medici.

Later, in Rome, the Medici popes continued in the family tradition of patronizing artists in Rome. Pope Leo X would chiefly commission works from Raphael, whereas Pope Clement VII commissioned Michelangelo to paint the altar wall of the Sistine Chapel just before the pontiff's death in 1534. Eleanor of Toledo, a princess of Spain and wife of Cosimo I the Great, purchased the Pitti Palace from Buonaccorso Pitti in 1550. Cosimo in turn patronized Vasari, who erected the Uffizi Gallery in 1560 and founded the Accademia delle Arti del Disegno – ("Academy of the Arts of Drawing") in 1563. Marie de' Medici, widow of Henry IV of France and mother of Louis XIII, is the subject of a commissioned cycle of paintings known as the Marie de' Medici cycle, painted for the Luxembourg Palace by court painter Peter Paul Rubens in 1622–23.

Although none of the Medici themselves were scientists, the family is well known to have been the patrons of the famous Galileo Galilei, who tutored multiple generations of Medici children and was an important figurehead for his patron's quest for power. Galileo's patronage was eventually abandoned by Ferdinando II, when the Inquisition accused Galileo of heresy. However, the Medici family did afford the scientist a safe haven for many years. Galileo named the four largest moons of Jupiter after four Medici children he tutored, although the names Galileo used are not the names currently used.

== Main genealogical table ==
The table below shows the origins of the Medici:

Medici Family Tree: Origins

Medico di Potrone; *1046 ? †1102
Bono; *1069 ? †1123
Bernardo; *1099 ? †1147
Giambuono de' Medici; *1131 ? †1192
Chiarissimo; *1167 ? †1210	Bonagiunta *? †1226
Filippo *? †?	Ugo *? †?	Galgano *? †?
Chiarissimo fl. 1253	Ranieri *? †?	Averardo I fl. 1280	Scolaio fl. 1269	Galgano fl. 1269
Filippo *? †1290	Ugolino *? †1301	Giambuono; *1260 †?	Averardo II; *1270 †1319	Arrigo *? †?	Bonagiunta fl. 1278
Arrigo *? †1348	Bonino fl. 1312	Cambio *? †~1356	Alamanno *? †1355	Bernardo fl. 1322	Lippo fl. 1306	Giovenco *? †1320	Conte fl. 1330	Salvestro *? †1346	Guccio; *1298 †1315	Ardingo fl. 1343
Bonino di Filippo	Vieri; *1323 †1395	Salvestro; *1331 ? †1388	Bernardo di Giambuono	Francesco *? †?	Giuliano I *? †1377	Conte di Averardo	Salvestro di Averardo	Francesco *? †?
Vieri di Cambio	Salvestro di Alemanno	Francesco di Giovenco	Antonio *? †?	Giuliano II *? †?	?
Giovenco *? †1447	Bernardetto; *1393 †1465?	Giuliano *? †?	Pietro *? †?	Giovanni *? †1475?	Castellina Tornaquinci	Fantino fl. 1426
Pierangelo *? †1464	Giovenco *? †1464?	Antonio fl. 1493	Domenico *? †?	Averardo fl. 1513	Francesco *? †?	Lorenzo fl. 1490	Giovenco *? †?
Francesco *? †?	Bernardo *? †?	Giovanni *? †?	Raffaele *? †?	Bernardetto *? †?	Galeotto *? †1528	Francesco *? †?	Ottaviano; *1482 †1546
Averardo; *1518 †1601	Giulio *? †?	Nicolò * †1562	Lorenzo * †1568	Francesco; *1519 †1584	Ottajano
Ottaviano; *1555 †1625	Giulio *? †?	Leone * †1596	Galeotto *? †?	Cosimo *? †?
Giulio *? †1626	Raffaele *? †1624	Nicolò *? †?	Francesco; *1585 †1664
Leone *? †1650	Averardo *? †1685	Giulio *? †1614
Filippo *? †1749	Francesco *? †1722	Pierpaolo fl. 1737	Francesco *? †1766	Nicolò Giuseppe *? †?
Leone fl. 1759	Averardo *? †1808	Filippo fl. 1775
Filippo *? †1821	Nicola *? †?	Anna Maria Luisa; *1756 †1797	Bindo Simone Peruzzi; *1729 †1794	Pierpaolo *? †?
Peruzzi de' Medici

This extract shows the branch that gave rise to the celebrated branch of the Medici descending from Giovanni "di Bicci", who founded the Medici fortunes:

Medico di Potrone (1046–1102)
Bono di Potrone (1069–1123)
Bernardo di Potrone (1099–1147)
Giambuono de' Medici (1131–1192)
Chiarissimo de' Medici I (1167–1210)
Filippo di Chiarissimo de' Medici
Averardo de' Medici I (fl. 1280)
Averardo de' Medici II (1270–1319)
Salvestro de Medici (il Chiarissimo III) (1300–1346)	Giovenco de' Medici (died 1320)
Averardo de' Medici III (1320–1363) m. Jacopa Spini	Giuliano de' Medici (d. 1377)
Giovanni di Bicci de' Medici (1360–1429) m. Piccarda Bueri
Antonio de' Medici (?–1398)	Damian de' Medici (1389–1390)	Cosimo de' Medici (the Elder) (1389–1464)	Contessina de' Bardi (ca.1390–1473)	Lorenzo de' Medici (the Elder) (1395–1440) m. Ginevra Cavalcanti	Antonio de' Medici
Piero I de' Medici (the Gouty) (1416–1469); Lord of Florence	Lucrezia Tornabuoni (1425–1482)	Carlo de' Medici (1430–1492)	Giovanni de' Medici (1421–1463) m. Ginevra degli Alessandrini	Francesco de' Medici (?–ca.1440)	Pierfrancesco de' Medici (the Elder) (1431–1476) m. Laudomia Acciaioli
Giovanni de' Medici (ante 1444–1478)	Maria de' Medici (1445–1472) m. Leonetto de' Rossi	Bianca de' Medici (1445–1505) m. Guglielmo de' Pazzi	Lucrezia de' Medici (Nannina) (1448–1493) m. Bernardo Rucellai	Lorenzo de' Medici (the Magnificent) (1449–1492); Lord of Florence m.(1) Clarice Orsini	Giuliano de' Medici (1453–1478)	Cosimo de' Medici (1452–1461)	Lorenzo the Popolano (1463–1503); Lord of Piombino m. Semiramide Appiani	Giovanni the Popolano (1467–1498) m. Caterina; Sforza	Bernardetto de' Medici (died 1475)
Lucrezia de' Medici (1470–1553) m. Jacopo Salviati	Piero II de' Medici (the Unfortunate) (1471–1503); Lord of Florence m. Alfonsina Orsini	Maddalena de' Medici (1473–1528) m. Franceschetto Cybo	Giovanni di Lorenzo de' Medici (1475–1521); Pope Leo X	Luisa de' Medici (1477–1488)	Contessina de' Medici (1478–1515) m. Piero Ridolfi	Giuliano de' Medici (1479–1516); Duke of Nemours	Giulio de' Medici (1478–1534); Pope Clement VII	Averardo de' Medici (1488–1495)	Ginevra de' Medici m. Giovanni degli Albizzi
Ippolito de' Medici (1511–1535); Cardinal)	Pierfrancesco de' Medici (the Younger) (1487–1525) m. Maria Soderini	Laudomia de' Medici m. Francesco; Salviati	Vincenzo de' Medici	Lorenzo de' Medici
Giovanni Salviati (1490–1553); Cardinal	Lorenzo Salviati (1492–1539)	Lorenzo II de' Medici (1492–1519); Duke of Urbino	Madeleine de La Tour (ca.1495–1519)	Clarissa de' Medici (1493–1528) m. Filippo Strozzi	Elena Salviati (1495–1552) m.(1) Pallavicino Pallavicino m.(2) Iacopo V Appiani	Battista Salviati (1498–1524)	Luisa Salviati m. Sigismund de Luna	Bernardo Salviati (1508–1568); Cardinal	Maria Salviati (1499–1543)	Ludovico de' Medici (Giovanni dalle Bande Nere) (1498–1526)
Francesca Salviati m. Ottaviano de' Medici	Piero Salviati	Piero Strozzi (1510–1558)	Laudomia de' Medici (?–1559)	Alamanno Salviati (1510–1571)	Lorenzino de' Medici (Lorenzaccio) (1514–1548)	Giuliano de' Medici (ca.1520–1588); Archbishop of Albi	Roberto Strozzi (ca.1512–1566)	Maddalena de' Medici (1523–1583)	Ottaviano de' Medici (1482–1546) m. Francesca Salviati
Alessandro Ottaviano de' Medici (1535–1605); Pope Leo XI	Alessandro de' Medici (the Moor) (1510–1537); Duke of Florence	Caterina de' Medici (1519–1589)	Henry II of France (1519–r.1547–1559)	Cosimo I de' Medici (1519–1574); Grand Duke of Tuscany
Bernadetto de' Medici	Giulia de' Medici (ca.1535–ca.1588)	Porzia de' Medici (1538–1565)	Francis II of France (1544–r.1559–1560)	Charles IX of France (1550–r.1560–1574)	Henry III of France (1551–r.1574–1589)	Francis, Duke of Anjou (1555–1584)	Francesco I de' Medici (1541–1587); Grand Duke of Tuscany	Claude (1547–1575) m. Charles III of Lorraine
Giulio de' Medici (ca.1533–1600)	Alessandro de' Medici (1560–1606)	Philip II of Spain (1527–r.1556–1598)	Elisabeth of Valois (1545–1568)	Margaret of Valois (1553–1615)	Henry IV of France (1553–r.1589–1610)	Marie de' Medici (1575–1642)	Christina of Lorraine (1565–1637)	Ferdinando I de' Medici (1549–1609); Grand Duke of Tuscany
Caterina de' Medici (?–1634)	Cosimo de' Medici (ca.1550–ca.1630)	Giuliano de' Medici	Philip III of Spain (1578–r.1598–1621)	Christine Marie (1606–1663) m. Victor Amadeus I of Savoy	Nicolas Henri, Duke of Orléans (1607–1611)	Gaston, Duke of Orléans (1608–1660)	Henrietta Maria of France (1609–1669) m. Charles I of England
Angela/Angelica de' Medici (1608–1636) m. Pietro Altemps	Philip IV of Spain (1605–r.1621–1665)	Elisabeth (1602–1644)	Louis XIII of France (1601–r.1610–1643)	Anne of Austria (1601–1666)	Charles II of England (1630–r.1660–1685)	Mary Henrietta Stuart (1631–1660) m. William II of Orange	James II of England (1633–r.1685–88 –1701)

This is the branch of Cosimo's brother, Lorenzo, called the "Popolano" Branch, which gave rise to the Grand-Dukes of Tuscany:

Lodovico de' Medici (1498–1526)	Maria Salviati (1499–1543)
Eleanor of Toledo (1522–1562)	Cosimo I (1519–1574); Grand Duke 1569–74	Camilla Martelli (ca.1545–1634)	Ferdinand I, Holy Roman Emperor (1503–r.1558–1564)
Bia de' Medici (1537–1542)	Maria de' Medici (1540–1557)	Isabella de' Medici (1542–1576) m. Paolo Giordano I Orsini	Giovanni de' Medici (1543–1562); Bishop of Pisa, Cardinall	Lucrezia de' Medici (1545–1561) m. Alfonso II d'Este	Pietro de' Medici (1554–1604)	Garzia de' Medici (1547–1562)	Antonio de' Medici (1548 – 1548)	Anna de' Medici (1553–1553)	Pietro (Pedricco) de' Medici (1546 – 1547)	Virginia de' Medici (1568 – 1615) m. Cesare d'Este
Johanna of Austria (1547–1578)	Francesco I (1541–1587); Grand Duke 1574–87	Bianca Cappello (1548–1587)	Christina of Lorraine (1565–1637)	Ferdinando I (1549–1609); Grand Duke 1587–1609	Don Giovanni de' Medici (1563–1621)	(Unnamed daughter) (1566–1566)
Eleanor de' Medici (1566–1611) m. Vincenzo I Gonzaga	Anna de' Medici (1569–1584)	Lucrezia de' Medici (1572–1574)	Antonio de' Medici (1576–1621)	Eleanor de' Medici (1591–1617)	Francesco de' Medici (1594–1614)	Filippino de' Medici (1599–1602)	Maria Maddalena de' Medici (1600–1633)	Charles II of Austria (1540–1590)
Romola de' Medici (1568–1568)	Isabella de' Medici (1571–1572)	Marie de' Medici (1575–1642) m. Henry IV of France	Philip de' Medici (1577–1582)	Caterina de' Medici (1593–1629) m. Ferdinando I Gonzaga	Carlo de' Medici (1595–1666); Cardinal Bishop of Ostia	Lorenzo de' Medici (1600–1648)
Christine Marie of France (1606–1663) m. Victor Amadeus I of Savoy	Louis XIII of France (1601–r.1610–1643)	Gaston of Orléans (1608–1660)	Cosimo II (1590–1621); Grand Duke 1609–21	Maria Magdalena of Austria (1589–1631)	Federico della Rovere (1605–1625)	Claudia de' Medici (1604–1648)	Leopold V of Austria (1586–1632)	Ferdinand II, Holy Roman Emperor (1578–r.1619–1637)
Maria Cristina de' Medici (1609–1632)	Ferdinando II (1610–1670); Grand Duke 1621–70	Vittoria della Rovere (1622–1694)	Gian Carlo de' Medici (1611–1663); Cardinal	Margherita de' Medici (1612–1679) m. Odoardo Farnese	Matteo de' Medici (1613–1667)	Francesco de' Medici (1614–1634)	Anna de' Medici (1616–1676)	Ferdinand Charles of Austria (1628–1662)	Leopoldo de' Medici (1617–1675); Cardinal
Cosimo de' Medici (1639–1639)	Cosimo III (1642–1723); Grand Duke 1670–1723	Marguerite Louise d'Orléans (1645–1721)	Francesco Maria de' Medici (1660–1711); Cardinal	Philip William, Elector Palatine (1615–1690)
Violante of Bavaria; 1673–1731)	Ferdinando (III) de' Medici (1663–1713)	Anna Maria Luisa de' Medici (1667–1743)	Johann Wilhelm, Elector Palatine (1658–1716)	Philip William August, Count Palatine of Neuburg (1668–1693)	Anna Maria Franziska of Saxe-Lauenburg (1673–1741)	Gian Gastone (1671–1737); Grand Duke 1723–37

== Titles ==
=== List of heads of the Medici ===
Portrait	Name	From	Until	Relationship with predecessor
	Giovanni di Bicci de' Medici	c. 1360	February 1429	Son of Averardo de' Medici, founder of the Medici Bank

==== Signore in the Republic of Florence ====
Portrait	Name	From	Until	Relationship with predecessor
	Cosimo de' Medici (Pater Patriae)	1434	1 August 1464	Son of Giovanni di Bicci de' Medici who was not as prominently involved in Florentine politics, rather more involved in the financial area.
	Piero I de' Medici (Piero the Gouty)	1 August 1464	2 December 1469	Eldest son of Cosimo de' Medici.
	Lorenzo I de' Medici (Lorenzo the Magnificent)	2 December 1469	9 April 1492	Eldest son of Piero I de' Medici.
	Piero II de' Medici (Piero the Unfortunate)	9 April 1492	8 November 1494	Eldest son of Lorenzo the Magnificent. Overthrown when Charles VIII of France invaded as a full republic was restored, first under the theocracy of Girolamo Savonarola and then statesman Piero Soderini.
	Cardinal Giovanni de' Medici	31 August 1512	9 March 1513	Brother of Piero the Unfortunate, second son of Lorenzo the Magnificent. Elected to the Papacy, becoming Pope Leo X.
	Giuliano de' Medici, Duke of Nemours	9 March 1513	17 March 1516	Brother of Cardinal Giovanni de' Medici, third son of Lorenzo the Magnificent.
	Lorenzo II de' Medici, Duke of Urbino	17 March 1516	4 May 1519	Nephew of Giuliano de' Medici, Duke of Nemours, son of Piero the Unfortunate. Father of Catherine de' Medici, Queen consort of France.
	Cardinal Giulio de' Medici	4 May 1519	19 November 1523	Cousin of Lorenzo II de' Medici, Duke of Urbino, son of Giuliano de' Medici who was the brother of Lorenzo the Magnificent. Elected to the Papacy, becoming Pope Clement VII.
	Cardinal Ippolito de' Medici	19 November 1523	24 October 1529	Cousin of Cardinal Giulio de' Medici, illegitimate son of Giuliano de' Medici, Duke of Nemours.

==== Dukes of Florence ====
Portrait	Name	From	Until	Relationship with predecessor
	Alessandro il Moro	24 October 1529	6 January 1537	Cousin of Cardinal Ippolito de' Medici, illegitimate son of Lorenzo II de' Medici, Duke of Urbino or Pope Clement VII. Acting signore during imperial Siege of Florence, made Duke in 1531.
	Cosimo I	6 January 1537	21 April 1574	Distant cousin of Alessandro de' Medici, Son of Giovanni dalle Bande Nere. dei Popolani line descended from Lorenzo the Elder, Brother of Cosimo de' Medici; also great-grandson of Lorenzo the Magnificent through his mother, Maria Salviati, and his grandmother, Lucrezia de' Medici. 1569, he was made Grand Duke of Tuscany.

==== Grand Dukes of Tuscany ====
Portrait	Name	From	Until	Relationship with predecessor
	Cosimo I	6 January 1569	21 April 1574	
	Francesco I	21 April 1574	17 October 1587	Eldest son of Cosimo I de' Medici, Grand Duke of Tuscany.
	Ferdinando I	17 October 1587	17 February 1609	Brother of Francesco I de' Medici, Grand Duke of Tuscany, son of Cosimo I de' Medici, Grand Duke of Tuscany.
	Cosimo II	17 February 1609	28 February 1621	Eldest son of Ferdinando I de' Medici, Grand Duke of Tuscany.
	Ferdinando II	28 February 1621	23 May 1670	Eldest son of Cosimo II de' Medici, Grand Duke of Tuscany.
	Cosimo III	23 May 1670	31 October 1723	Eldest son of Ferdinando II de' Medici, Grand Duke of Tuscany.
	Gian Gastone	31 October 1723	9 July 1737	Second son of Cosimo III de' Medici, Grand Duke of Tuscany.

== Coats of arms ==
The origin of the Medici coat of arms is not recorded. One unproven story traces their ancestry to a knight of Charlemagne's, Averardo, who defeated a giant, Mugello. In reward, Charlemagne is said to have rewarded Averardo with the shield mauled by the giant, with the dents in the shape of balls, and the giant's lands in Mugello.

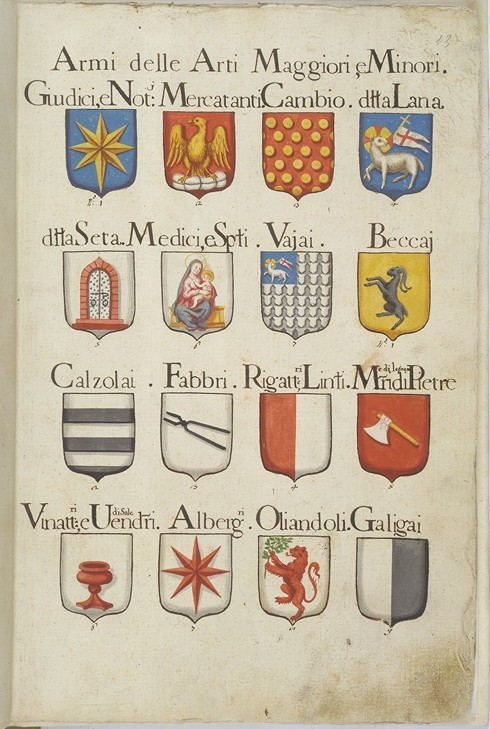
Florentine Guild Arms with the Moneychangers in top row 3rd

The simplest, though also unproven, theory suggests that the balls represented coins copied from the coat of arms of the Guild of Moneychangers (Arte del Cambio) to which the Medici belonged. That shield was red strewn with Byzantine coins (bezants). The number of balls also varied with time, as shown below. It has also been argued that these coins referenced the three coins or golden balls associated with St. Nicholas, particularly as the saint was invoked by Italian bankers as they took oaths.

As an Italian vocabulary word, "medici" means "medical doctors" and identifications with the family members as physicians may be found among their names as early as the eleventh century. Fanciful stories depict the images as pills or cupping glasses, a late-medieval medical instrument used to draw blood. Pills did not exist until much later and bloodletting was not a common practice at the time of the first Medici coat of arms. Art historian Rocky Ruggiero suggests, that the images may represent whole ripe blood oranges that typically are grown in Italy. Although knowledge of vitamins did not exist at the time, the benefit of oranges for certain diseases was recognized and their association with recommendations by medical doctors suggests to Ruggiero that this likely is the imagery intended in the coats of arms for the Medici family.

Alternatively, it has been suggested that the Medici coat of arms was initially inspired by symbols drawn from Etruscan votive sculpture, examples of which feature an oval dome with balls (echoing the forms of the Medici shield), as well as six balls within a triangle (as found in the alternative, triangular version of the Medici emblem). This particular influence offers an explanation for the red hue of the Medici balls, the colour of the terracotta sculpture. It would also have reflected the family's interest in Etruscan art and culture. In addition, the notion of Etruscan votive sculpture would have chimed with the participation of the Medici in the religious custom of offering up votive statues, a practice that recalled the ancient Etruscan convention of donating sculptures in the hope of, or gratitude for, divine favour. Such favours would have included the wish for a strong and healthy family, both for the supplicant and their descendants.

Arms of the Florentine Guild of Moneychangers (Arte del Cambio)

Old coat of arms of the Medici used by Giovanni di Bicci and Cosimo the Elder

The intermediate coat of arms of the Medici, Or, six balls in orle gules

The "augmented coat of arms of the Medici, Or, five balls in orle gules, in chief a larger one of the arms of France (viz. Azure, three fleurs-de-lis or) was granted by Louis XI in 1465.

Great coat of arms of Medici of Ottajano

Coat of Arms of the Grand-Duke of Tuscany

Coat of arms of Medici popes

Coat of arms of the Medici Cardinals

Coat of Arms of Catherine of Medici, as Queen of France

Coat of Arms of Maria of Medici, as Queen of France

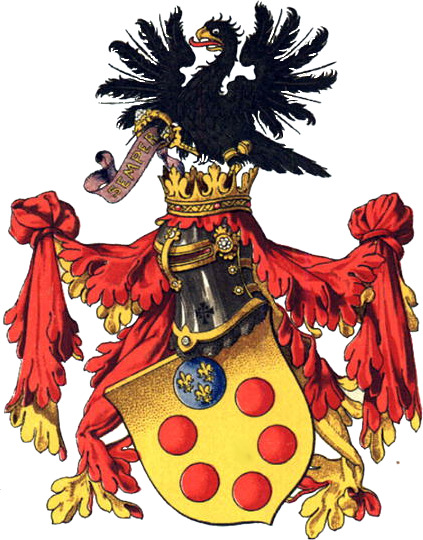
Achievement of the House of de' Medici

== See also ==
- Medici family tree
- List of popes from the Medici family
- Strozzi family (surviving), Pazzi family (extinct) rivals of the Medici
- Castellini Baldissera family (relatives of the Medici)

== Notes ==
Royal house House of Medici
New title	Ruling house of the Duchy of Florence; 1533–69	Elevated to Grand Dukes of Tuscany
New title Elevated from Duchy of Florence	Ruling house of the Grand Duchy of Tuscany; 1569–1737	Succeeded by House of Lorraine
