= Averardo de' Medici =

Italian noble (1320–1363)

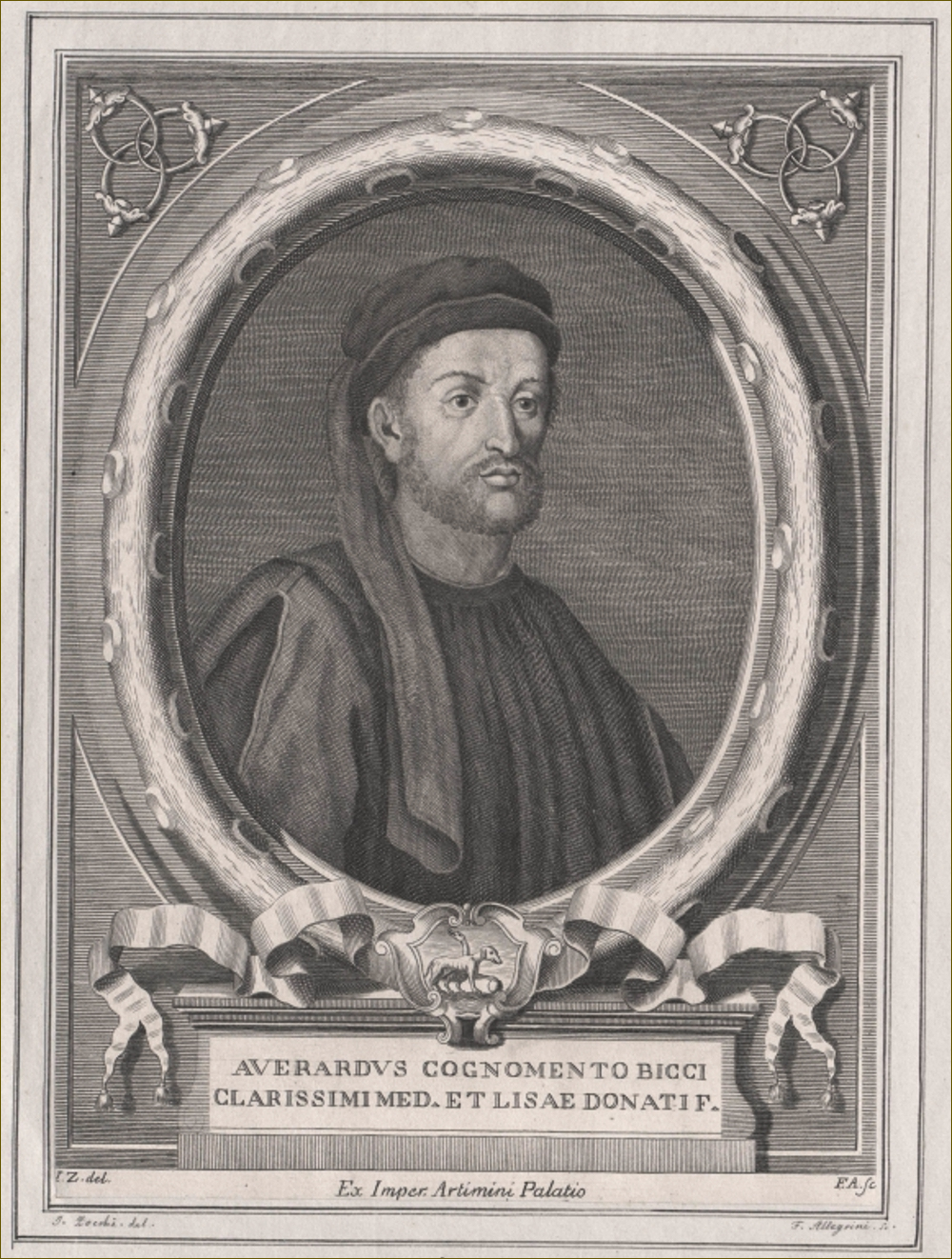
- 17th-century image of Averardo de' Medici
- Born: 1320
- Died: 1363 (aged 42–43)
- Noble family: Medici
- Spouse: Jacopa Spini
- Issue: Giovanni di Bicci de' Medici; Francesco de' Medici; Antonia de' Medici
- Father: Salvestro de Medici 'il Chiarissimo'
- Mother: Lisa Donati

Averardo de' Medici (1320 – 1363), also known as Everard De Medici or Bicci to disambiguate with his two homonymous ancestors, was the son of Salvestro de' Medici (1300, Florence – 1346, Florence; son of Averardo II de' Medici, 1270–1319), "il Chiarissimo" (English meaning "the fairest" for his complexion, or also interpreted as "the clearest") and the father of three children: Giovanni, Francesco, and Antonia. Giovanni di Bicci de' Medici would become the first historically significant member of the Medici family of Florence and the founder of the Medici Bank.

He was named after the legendary knight Averardo, from whom the Medici claimed descent. He was a second cousin of Salvestro de' Medici.

== Issue ==
- Giovanni di Bicci de' Medici; married Piccarda Bueri.
- Francesco de' Medici (d. 1402); married Selvaggia Gianfigliazzi and Francesca Balducci.
- Antonia de' Medici; married Angelo Ardinghelli.
