= Gran maestro =

Unofficial head of state in the Italian city-states

A gran maestro was the unofficial head of state in the Italian city-states. The role could depend on holding a particular office, military power, or a general subversion of the constitution.

The Scaliger family in Verona converted their control of the office of podestà into a permanent lordship as early as 1226. The Sforza dynasty rose from condottieri to be dukes of Milan in 1447. The Medici relied on financial power and control of the selection process for office to establish their own dominance in Florence, although it took them until 1532 to acquire the formal title of Duke of Florence and abolish all vestiges of the republic.
