= Vieri de' Medici =

Florentine banker (1323–1395)

Gonfaloniere of Justice
- Reign: May 1392 – June 1392
- Full name: Vieri di Cambio de' Medici
- Born: 1323
- Died: 13 or 14 September 1395 (aged 72); Florence, Republic of Florence
- Buried: Florence Cathedral
- Noble family: de Medici
- Spouses: Valenza (13??–1378; her death); Bice di Pazzino Strozzi
- Issue: Valenza; Niccola; Bice; Cambio
- Father: Cambio di Filippo de' Medici

Vieri di Cambio de' Medici (1323 – 13 or 14 September 1395) was a Florentine banker, a distant relative of the Medici banking dynasty.

He was the son of Cambio di Filippo de' Medici of the Lippo di Chiarissimo branch of the Medici. His first cousin was Salvestro di Alamanno de' Medici, a Florentine patrician known for causing the Ciompi Revolt in Florence.

== Career ==
Vieri de' Medici was enrolled in the Arte del Cambio, a major banking guild in Florence, where he presumably mastered the banking trade. He pursued different ventures over the course of his lifetime. His first prominent company, Vieri di Cambio de' Medici & Co., was responsible for shipping Florentine goods through the Republic of Pisa in 1369. De' Medici later partnered with other prominent bankers at the time, notably Niccolò di Riccardo Fagni, Giovanni di Arrigo Rinaldeschi da Prato and Jacopo di Francesco Venturi. Vieri de' Medici's distant relative, Francesco di Bicci de' Medici joined as a junior partner in 1382. By 1385, Vieri de' Medici ran a successful joint venture with Venturi called Vieri de' Medici and Jacopo di Francesco Venturi. This joint venture maintained a branch in Venice which "dealt in foreign bills" and had correspondents along the Dalmatian coast, most notably in Zara. Francesco de' Medici later became senior partner, as evidenced in a letter dated 4 July 1390, which also indicated a branch in Genoa. Vieri de' Medici also maintained a branch in Rome, under a separate partnership with Francesco's younger brother, Giovanni di Bicci de' Medici. This venture was known as Vieri e Giovanni de' Medici in Roma and was established in 1386.

Records suggest Vieri de' Medici retired from banking in 1393. His bank was dissolved prior, in either 1391 or 1392. The remnants were sold off to relatives, who established three independent banks. The first bank was established by Vieri's nephew, Antonio di Giovanni de' Medici. Joining Antonio de' Medici were banker Giovanni di Salvestro and Vieri de' Medici's old business partner, Jacopo di Francesco Venturi. This bank is thought to have been dissolved by 1395. The second bank was established by Francesco di Bicci de' Medici, in the name of his son Averardo di Francesco de' Medici. This bank eventually was dissolved by 1443. The third, and most successful, bank was established by Giovanni di Bicci de' Medici and junior partner Benedetto di Lippaccio de' Bardi in Rome. Later known as the Medici Bank, it rose the Medici family to prominence. Its precursor was the earlier joint venture established in Rome in 1386. Records dated from 1397 suggest that Giovanni de' Medici was "forced to take over all the assets and liabilities" of Vieri de' Medici, which included "a number of bad debts". Giovanni lost over 860 florins as a result of the deal, but managed to create a successful bank that lasted for decades afterward.

== Political stance ==
Following his retirement from banking, Vieri de' Medici became politically active. He was an ally of Maso degli Albizzi and was selected Gonfaloniere of Justice, serving the role May–June 1392. Many Florentine citizens expected Vieri de' Medici to lead a renewed revolt against the Albizzi regime, following in the footsteps of his cousin Salvestro in the earlier Ciompi Revolt.

== Personal life ==
Vieri de' Medici married twice. He married his first wife, Valenza, sometime before 1364. She died childless in September 1378. He later married Bice di Pazzino Strozzi, the daughter of a political ally, late in his life. Bice Strozzi gave birth to two sons, Niccola in 1384 or 1385 and Cambio on 1390 or 22 February 1391, and two daughters, Valenza and Bice. Upon the death of Vieri de' Medici, as stipulated by his will signed on 12 August 1395, each daughter was to receive 1,200 florins for their dowries, and whatever remained of Vieri's fortune was to be inherited by his surviving sons. Niccola and Cambio eventually established a bank of their own in Florence, with a branch in Rome. Unlike their father, the two proved incompetent in running their business, and by 1433, they had "sold most of their real estate in order to extinguish the liabilities of their bank".

Vieri de' Medici died on either 13 or 14 September 1395, and was buried in the Florence Cathedral.
