= Giovanni di Bicci de' Medici =

Italian banker (c. 1360–1429)

Giovanni de' Medici
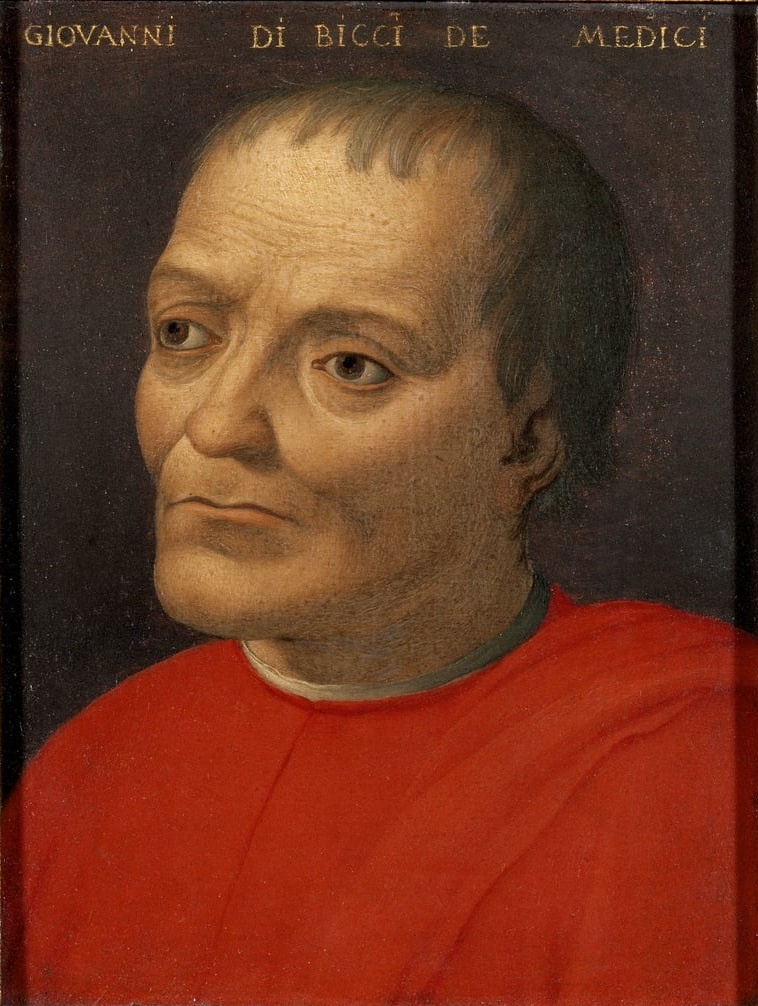
- Portrait by Agnolo Bronzino
- Full name: Giovanni di Bicci de' Medici
- Born: 1360; Florence, Republic of Florence
- Died: 20 February 1429 (aged 69); Florence, Republic of Florence
- Noble family: Medici
- Spouse: Piccarda Bueri (m. 1386)
- Issue: Cosimo de' Medici; Damiano de' Medici; Lorenzo de' Medici; Antonio de' Medici; A daughter
- Father: Averardo de' Medici
- Mother: Jacopa Spini

Giovanni di Bicci de' Medici (c. 1360 – February 1429) was an Italian banker and founder of the Medici Bank. While other members of the Medici family, such as Chiarissimo di Giambuono de' Medici, who served in the Signoria of Florence in 1401, and Salvestro de' Medici, who was implicated in the Ciompi Revolt of 1378, are of historical interest, it was Giovanni's founding of the family bank that truly initiated the family's rise to power in Florence. He was the father of Cosimo de' Medici and of Lorenzo the Elder; grandfather of Piero di Cosimo de' Medici; great-grandfather of Lorenzo de' Medici (the Magnificent); and the great-great-great-grandfather of Cosimo I de' Medici, Grand Duke of Tuscany.

== Biography ==
Giovanni di Bicci de' Medici was born in Florence, Italy. He was the son of Averardo de' Medici and Jacopa Spini. His father, Averardo died in 1363 with a respectable amount of wealth. This inheritance was divided among Giovanni and his four brothers, leaving Giovanni with very little. However, his uncle, Vieri de' Medici, was still a prominent banker in Florence. Vieri helped Giovanni begin his career in the Florentine banking system. He worked his way up through the ranks, eventually becoming a junior partner in the branch located in Rome. Vieri de' Medici retired in 1393 leaving the bank in the hands of Giovanni. From this point the Medici bank grew vastly and quickly. This growth culminated with the acquisition as the Chief Papal Banker, which meant that the Medici Bank now handled the accounts of the Church. The Medici family bank, which he founded in 1397, became his main commercial interest. The Medici bank under Giovanni had branches throughout the northern Italian city-states.

Giovanni owned two wool workshops in Florence, and was a member of two guilds: the Arte della Lana and the Arte del Cambio. In 1402, he served as one of the judges on the panel that selected Lorenzo Ghiberti's design for the bronzes on the doors to the Florence Baptistery. Giovanni also funded the construction of the sacristy in the Church of San Lorenzo in the year 1418. He picked Brunelleschi to be the architect and chose Donatello to create the sculptures. These are just a few of the many contributions that Giovanni made to the art world.

In 1414, Giovanni bet on the permanent return of the papacy to Rome after a long period of exile and schism, and was correct; the papacy was permanently installed in Rome in 1417 under a single pope after the deliberations of the Council of Constance. Rewarding Giovanni for his support, Pope Martin V gave Giovanni's general manager control of the Apostolic Chamber. He set his family on the path to becoming one of the richest dynasties in Europe, thereby making an essential stride towards its later cultural and political prominence. One way in which he laid the groundwork for this was by marrying Piccarda Bueri, whose old and respectable family brought him a large dowry.

In 1418, Giovanni Medici collaborated with one of Florence's chief nobles, Niccolò da Uzzano, to secure the release of the deposed Antipope John XXIII, who was imprisoned in Germany. De Medici paid the stiff ransom of 38,000 ducats himself, and when the former pope died the following year in Florence, de Medici sponsored the construction of his magnificent tomb in the Baptistery.

Despite his growing wealth, Giovanni was diligent in his efforts not to separate the Medici family from the other citizens in Florence. He did so by continuously ensuring that he and his sons dressed and behaved like the average working-class citizens of Florence. This was in part due to his desire not to draw undue attention to himself and his family, and to ensure that, unlike other wealthy families, the Medici remained in the favour of the population. His hopes were to build a positive reputation of his family by avoiding conflicts with the law and keeping the people of Florence happy. His disposition can be understood in his writings, "Strive to keep the people at peace, and the strong places well cared for. Engage in no legal complications, for he who impedes the law shall perish by the law. Do not draw public attention on yourselves yet keep free from blemish as I leave you."

=== Political activity ===
Giovanni stayed at arms length from politics for much of his life, but he was urged to reluctantly accept various positions of high office throughout his life in the Signoria of Florence because of the prestige and universal popularity he enjoyed in the city. His attitude is exemplified in his writings to his son Cosimo, saying, "Do not make the government-house your work shop, but wait until you are called to it, then show your selves obedient." He served as a Priore in the Signoria in 1402, 1408, and 1411 and as a Gonfaloniere for the statutory two-month period in 1421. In 1407, he also served as the governor of the city of Pistoia.

In the sphere of politics, Giovanni stayed true to his reputation and the tradition of the Medici family as champions of the people and intractable opponents of the nobility of Florence. In 1426, he exerted his considerable personal influence in the Signoria to replace Florence's inequitable and oppressive poll tax with the Catasto. This was a particular property tax devised by Giovanni wherein the tax burden was shifted from the poorer classes in Florence, making it more difficult for the nobility to evade their share. The following year he once again wielded his personal authority and influence in the Signoria to block the passage of oligarchic reforms proposed by the nobility, which would have repealed the ban on nobles serving in the Signoria, and removed some of the lesser guilds from being represented there.

== Issue ==
By his wife Piccarda Bueri, he had five children:

- Cosimo di Giovanni de' Medici (1389–1464). Pater Patriae and Lord of Florence, grandfather of Lorenzo the Magnificent.
- Damiano di Giovanni de' Medici (d.1390). Most probably Cosimo's twin, died young.
- Lorenzo di Giovanni de' Medici (1395–1440). Progenitor of the "Popolare" branch of the family, the Grand Ducal line will descend from him.
- Antonio di Giovanni de' Medici (born c. 1398). Died young.

== Legacy ==
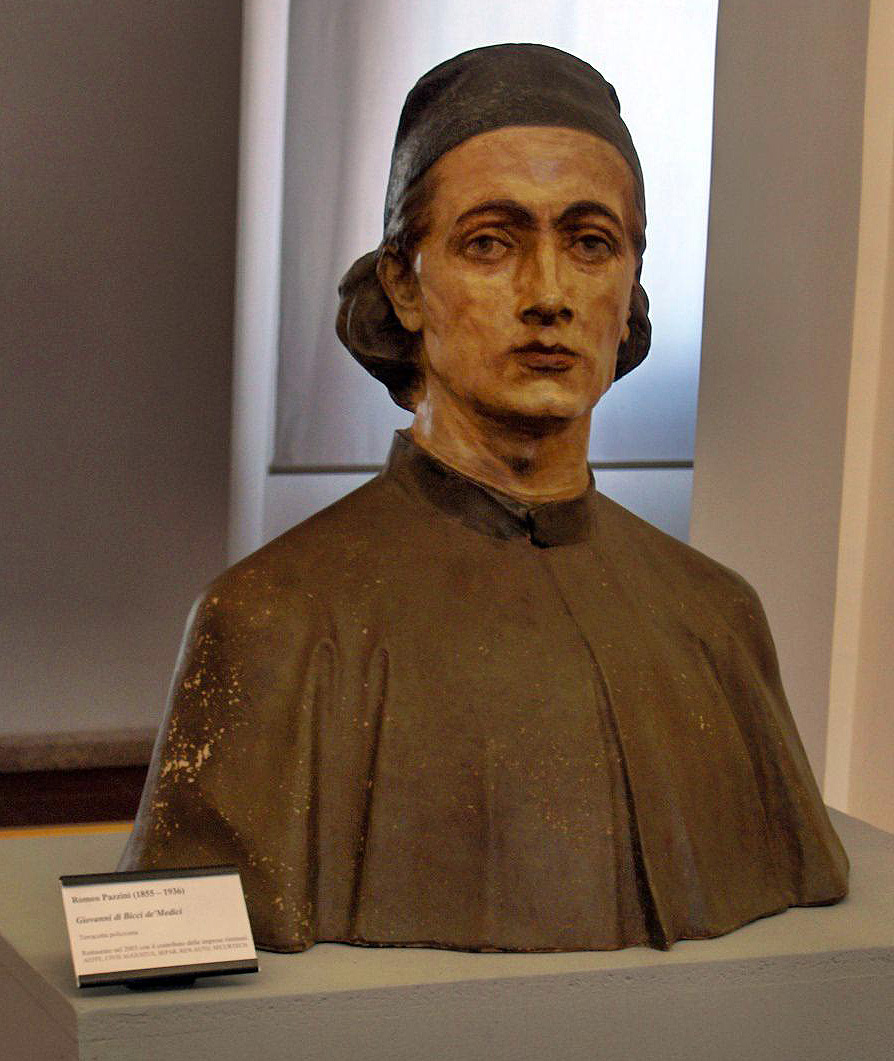
Bust of Giovanni di Bicci de' Medici by Romeo Pazzini (1855–1936); Museo della città di Rimini

When he died, di Bicci was one of the wealthiest men in Florence, as shown by his tax report of 1429. It was reported that upon his death, he was the second richest man in Florence, leaving an abundance of wealth to his son Cosimo. This wealth and banking system led to Cosimo becoming one of the wealthiest men in Europe. Also upon his death, he had become a favorite amongst the Florentine public, with even professional rival Niccolò da Uzzano. Niccolò states in a letter to Giovanni's sons that he had made the family beloved by the people and positioned them for great success. In 1420, Giovanni had given the majority of control of the bank to his two sons, Cosimo and Lorenzo. Upon his death in 1429, he was buried in the Old Sacristy of the Basilica of San Lorenzo, Florence, and his wife was buried with him after her death four years later.

== Fictional depictions ==
Giovanni de' Medici is portrayed by Dustin Hoffman in the 2016 television series Medici: Masters of Florence.

== Sources ==
- Grendler, Paul F.; M. J. B. Allen; William R. Bowen; Margaret L. King; Stanford E. Lehmberg; Nelson H. Minnich; Sara T. Nalle; Robert J. Rodini; Ingrid D. Rowland; David B. Ruderman; Erika Rummel; J.H.M. Salmon; William A. Wallace; O.P, eds. (1999). Encyclopedia of the Renaissance. New York: Charles Schribner's Sons.
- Hibbert, Christopher (1975). The House of the Medici: Its Rise and Fall. New York: William Morrow & Company, Inc. ISBN 978-0-688-00339-5 – via Internet Archive.
- Parks, Tim (2005). Medici Money: Banking, Metaphysics, and Art in Fifteenth-Century Florence. New York and London: W.W. Norton & Company. ISBN 978-0-393-05827-7 – via Internet Archive.
- Pernis, Maria Grazia; Adams, Laurie (2006). Lucrezia Tornabuoni de' Medici and the Medici family in the fifteenth century. Peter Lang Publishing, Inc, New York.
- Tomas, Natalie R. (2003). The Medici Women: Gender and Power in Renaissance Florence. Aldershot: Ashgate. ISBN 0-7546-0777-1.
- Young, G.F. (1930). The Medici. Random House. New York.
