= Giovanni il Popolano =

Italian nobleman (1467–1498)

Giovanni de' Medici il Popolano
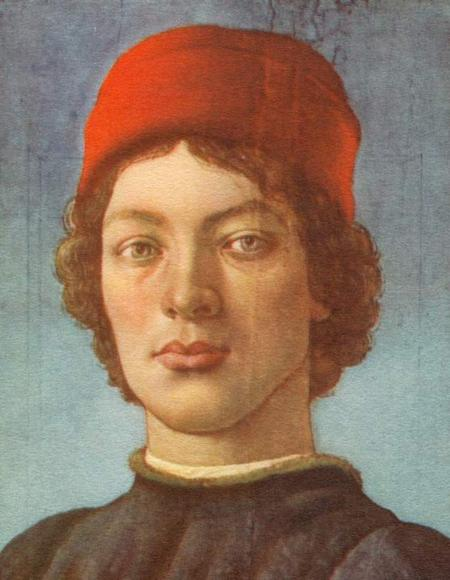
- Possible portrait of Giovanni, by Sandro Botticelli
- Full name: Giovanni di Pierfrancesco de' Medici
- Born: October 21, 1467; Florence, Republic of Florence
- Died: 14 September 1498 (aged 30); Santa Maria in Bagno, Papal States
- Noble family: Medici "Popolano" Branch
- Spouse: Caterina Sforza
- Issue: Giovanni delle Bande Nere
- Father: Pierfrancesco the Elder
- Mother: Laudomia Acciaioli

Giovanni de' Medici, in full Giovanni di Pierfrancesco de' Medici, later known as il Popolano (the commoner) (21 October 1467 – 14 September 1498) was an Italian nobleman of the Medici House of Florence. He was the son of Pierfrancesco di Lorenzo de' Medici, and therefore a member of a secondary branch of the family.

== Biography ==
Giovanni was born in Florence on 21 October 1467. After his father's death (1476), he and his elder brother Lorenzo (il Popolano) came under the tutelage of their cousins Giuliano and Lorenzo (il Magnifico), and were educated by humanists such as Marsilio Ficino and Angelo Poliziano. They conceived a passion for classical studies and books, and later created a large library of manuscripts and codexes.

Later their relationship with Lorenzo il Magnifico deteriorated, mostly for economic reasons (Lorenzo had kept for himself the Popolanos' inheritance, instead of simply administering it). After Lorenzo il Magnifico's death, they were among the opponents of Lorenzo's successor, Piero (il Fatuo), who exiled them in April 1494.

The following November, Lorenzo and Giovanni returned to Florence in the wake of Charles VIII of France's invasion of Italy, as Piero had been ousted by a Republican revolution in the city. Their support for Girolamo Savonarola gained them the Popolano ("commoner", "plebeian") nickname.

He was to marry Luisa de' Medici, but she died in 1488 at aged 11. In September 1497 Giovanni married Caterina Sforza, Lady of Forlì and Imola. They had a son, baptized Ludovico in April 1498. However, after Giovanni's death soon afterwards, Caterina renamed the baby Giovanni. He became known as Giovanni delle Bande Nere.

Giovanni il Popolano died on 14 September 1498 in Santa Maria in Bagno, Papal States, aged 30.
