= Pierfrancesco the Elder =

Italian nobleman and banker (1430–1476)

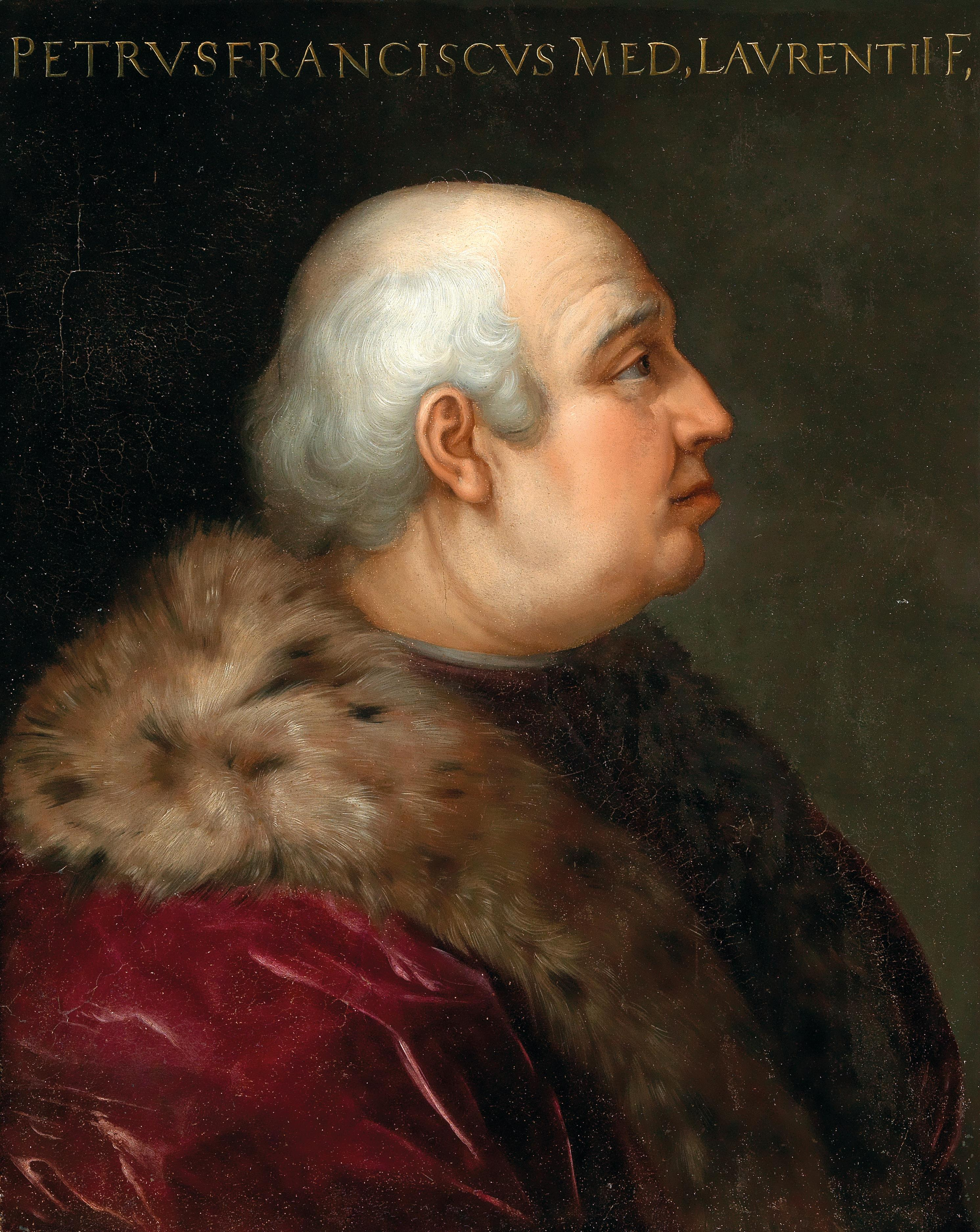
- Later portrait of Pierfrancesco de’ Medici
- Born: 1430; Florence, Republic of Florence
- Died: 19 July 1476 (aged 45–46); Florence, Republic of Florence
- Noble family: Medici
- Spouse: Laudomia di Agnolo Acciaioli
- Issue: Lorenzo di Pierfrancesco de' Medici; Giovanni de' Medici il Popolano
- Father: Lorenzo the Elder
- Mother: Ginevra Cavalcanti

Pierfrancesco de' Medici the Elder (1430 – 19 July 1476), Anglicized as Peter Francis de' Medici, was an Italian nobleman, banker, diplomat, and a member of the House of Medici of Florence.

== Biography ==
Born in Florence, he was the son of Lorenzo the Elder and Ginevra Cavalcanti, thus a nephew of Cosimo de' Medici and cousin to Piero the Gouty, de facto lords of the city from 1459.

Pierfrancesco was orphaned in 1440 and was raised by his uncle Cosimo. He served the Republic of Florence as ambassador (to the pope in 1458 and to the Duchy of Mantua in 1463) and as Priore delle Arti ("Prior of the Guilds") in the Florentine municipal government (1459). After Cosimo's death (1464), Pierfrancesco was initially a supporter of Piero the Gouty, but later sided against him; he was among the conspirators who participated in Luca Pitti's failed coup in 1466. Forgiven by Piero, he thenceforth took care of the family bank.

From his marriage with Laudomia di Agnolo Acciaioli he had two sons: Lorenzo (1463–1503) and Giovanni (1467–1498), who were later fierce opponents of Cosimo's line of the Medici.

Pierfrancesco died in 1476. His sons were adopted by their second cousin Lorenzo il Magnifico.

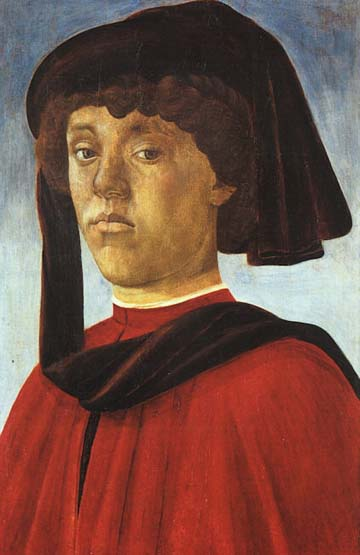
Lorenzo

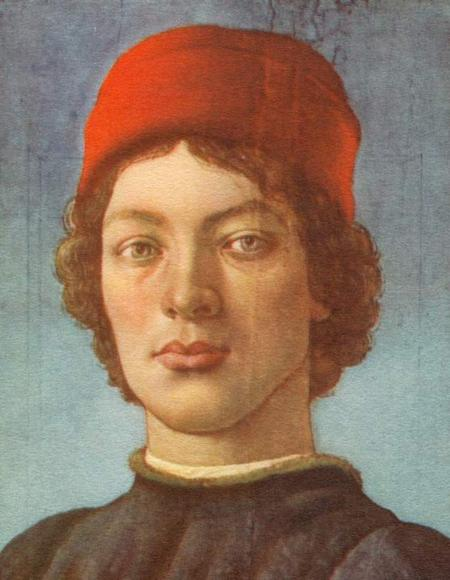
Giovanni
