= Romeo Pazzini =

Italian painter

Romeo Pazzini (Verucchio, Forlì, 18 May 1855 - 1942) was an Italian sculptor, painter, and ceramic artist (ceramist).

== Biography ==
He briefly studied at the Academies of Forlì, Bologna, Parma and Florence, obtaining from each medals of encouragement; and a diploma as master of Ornamentatation. He graduated with honors from the Academy of Fine Arts of Ravenna, and was there awarded prizes for oil paintings and for modelling a sculptural group titled Apotheosis of King Vittorio Emanuele. Among his oil paintings are: The Last days of Torquato Tasso and Esmeralda e Amore disperato. He became professor of Decorative Invention for the scuole Tecniche e Magistrali at Ravenna.

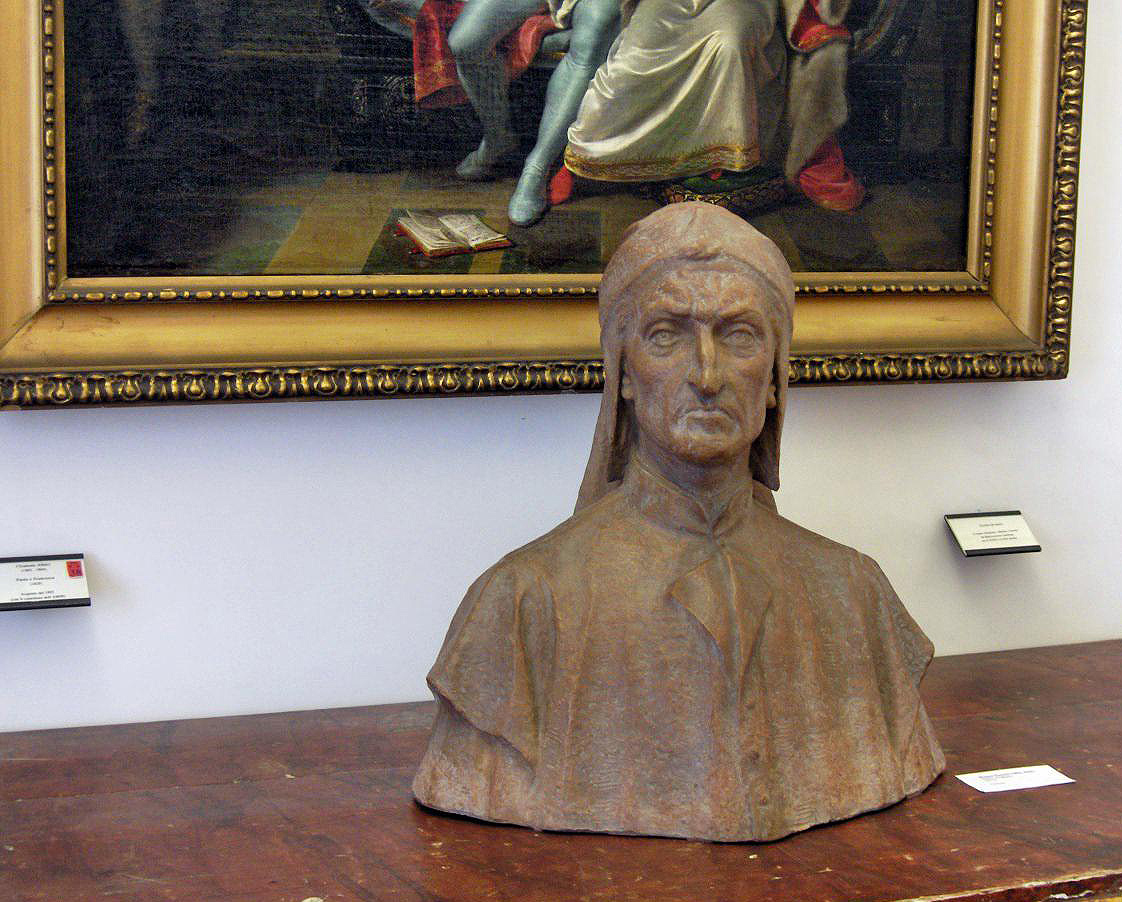
Bust of Dante at Museo della città di Rimini.

He later moved to Florence and became the head of design for the ceramic sculpture at the Cantagalli Ceramic Factory, where he worked under Ulisse Cantagalli (died 1901), and created statuettes and bas-reliefs in both modern and Renaissance styles, recalling Lucca della Robbia and Benvenuto Cellini. The Pinacoteca Moretti has a terra-cotta heraldic shield of the town of Civitanova, sculpted by Pazzini.
