= Lorenzo the Elder =

Italian banker (1394–1440)

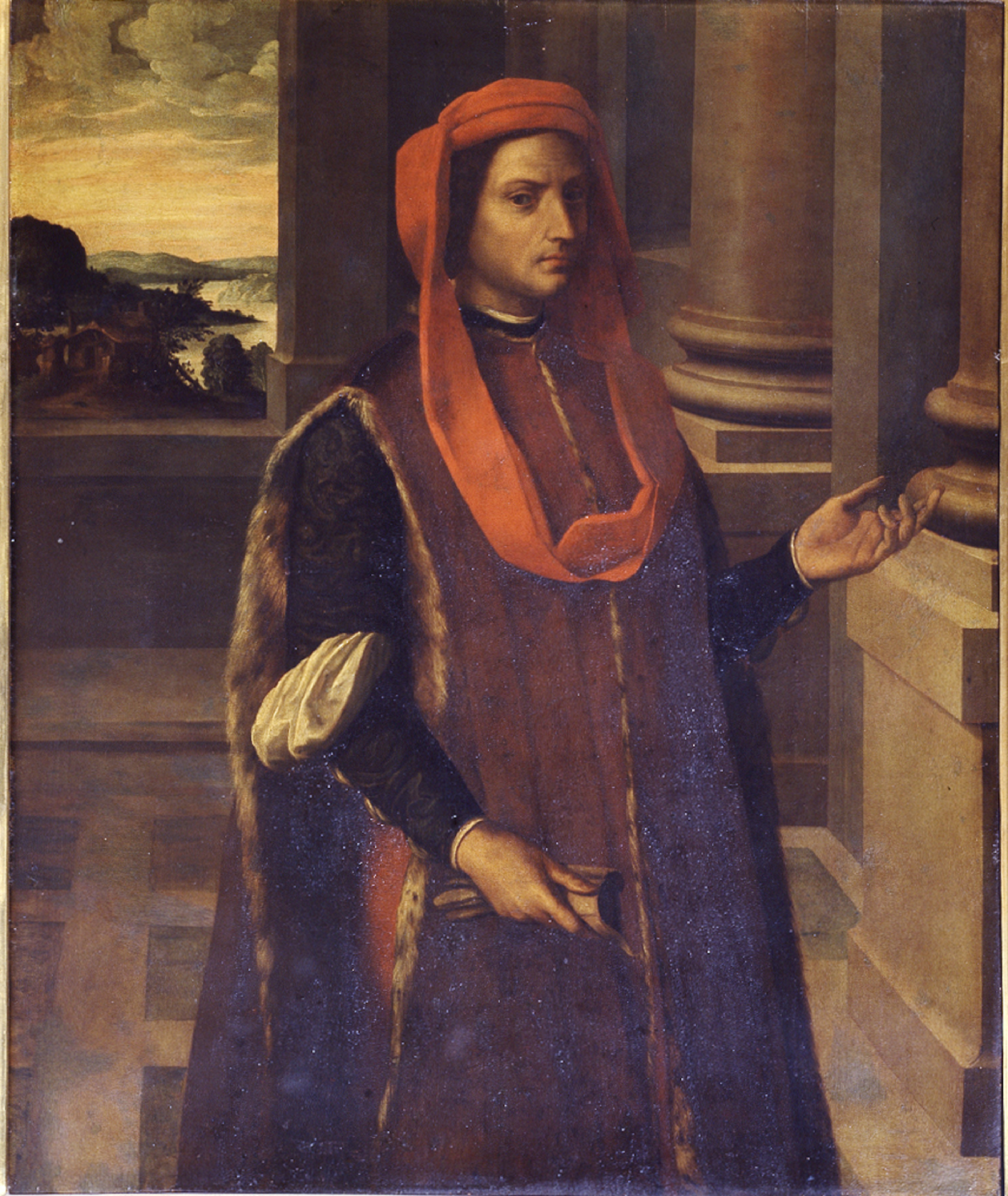
- Posthumous portrait by Alessandro Allori, 1585
- Born: c. 1395; Florence, Republic of Florence
- Died: 23 September 1440 (aged 45); Careggi, Republic of Florence
- Noble family: Medici
- Spouse: Ginevra Cavalcanti
- Issue: Francesco de' Medici; Pierfrancesco the Elder
- Father: Giovanni di Bicci de' Medici
- Mother: Piccarda Bueri

Lorenzo the Elder (12 October 1394 – 23 September 1440) was an Italian banker of the House of Medici of Florence, the younger brother of Cosimo de' Medici the Elder and progenitor of the so-called "Popolani" ("populist, i.e. for the people") line of the family, named for a later generation whose members were supporters of the Florentine political activist Girolamo Savonarola.

== History ==
Lorenzo was the son of Giovanni di Bicci de' Medici and Piccarda Bueri. He was educated by Carlo Marsuppini. In 1416, he married Ginevra Cavalcanti. To celebrate their marriage, the Venetian humanist Francesco Barbaro wrote his treatise De Re Uxoria, an analysis of marriage that continued to be published for centuries. Lorenzo and Ginevra had two sons: Francesco, who was childless, and Pierfrancesco, who originated the Popolani line. Ginevra Cavalcanti was an aunt of the wife of the famous Italian merchant Giovanni Arnolfini.

Lorenzo followed his brother Cosimo in his military maneuvers at Ferrara, Verona and Vicenza. In 1433 he tried to muster an army to free Cosimo from imprisonment when the latter was arrested under the charge of tyranny. Later, he joined him at Venice and returned with him in Florence triumphantly after Cosimo's rehabilitation.

Though dedicating himself much to banking activity, Lorenzo held several positions in the Florentine Republic and was ambassador to Pope Eugene IV and the Republic of Venice. In 1435, he moved to Rome to oversee the affairs of the Medici Bank at the papal court.

Lorenzo the Elder was ancestor to all the Grand Dukes of Tuscany through his direct descendant Cosimo I de' Medici. He is also the ancestor to seven kings of France beginning with Louis XIII as a result of the marriage of Marie de' Medici to King Henry IV of France.

He died in the Medici Villa of Careggi in 1440 and was buried in the Basilica of San Lorenzo.

== Fictional depictions ==
A young Lorenzo is portrayed by Stuart Martin in the 2016 television series Medici: Masters of Florence. Although the television production has him assassinated, these events did not take place in real life. The show appears to be using elements from a later attack on his great nephew, Giuliano de' Medici, for dramatic effect.

== Bibliography ==
- Tomas, Natalie R. (2003). The Medici Women: Gender and Power in Renaissance Florence. Aldershot: Ashgate. ISBN 0754607771.
