= Piccarda Bueri =

Italian noblewoman (1368–1433)

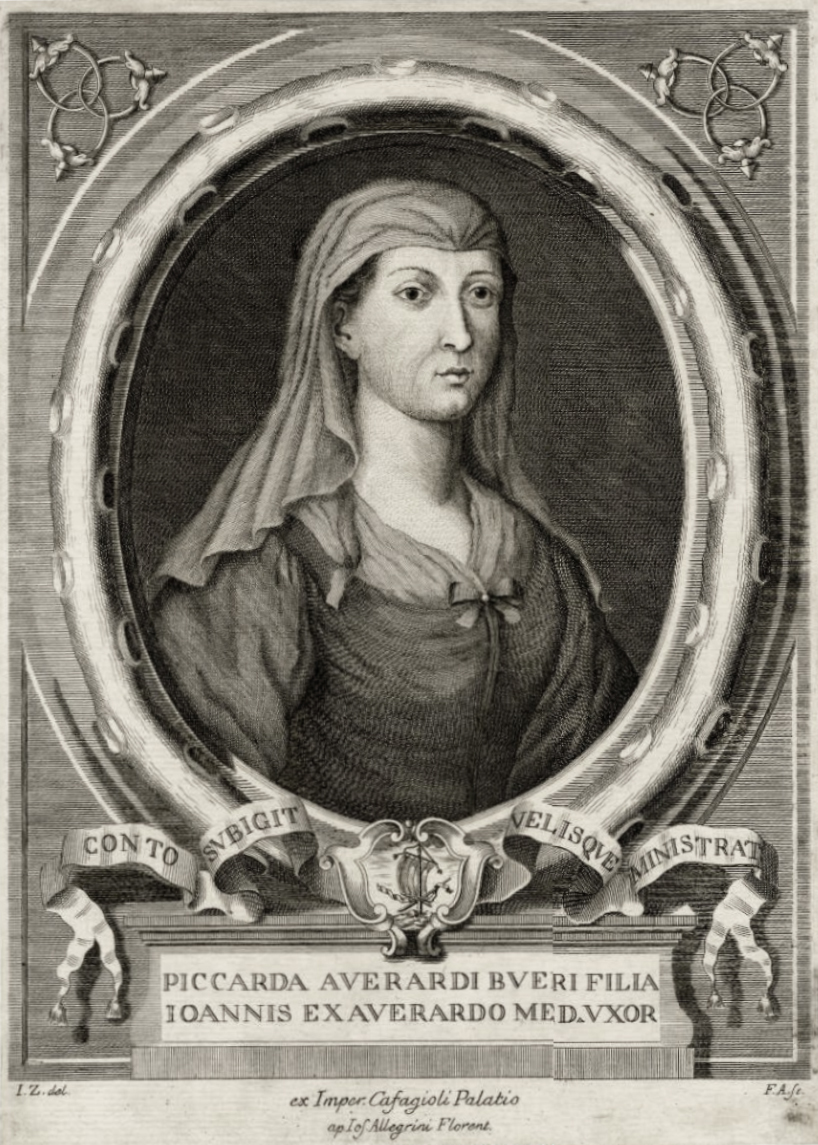
- Born: 1368; Verona
- Died: 19 April 1433 (aged 64–65); Florence
- Noble family: Bueri
- Spouse: Giovanni di Bicci de' Medici (m. 1386; died 1429)
- Issue: Cosimo de' Medici; Damiano de' Medici; Lorenzo the Elder; Antonio de' Medici; A daughter
- Father: Edoardo Bueri

Piccarda Bueri (1368– 19 April 1433) was an Italian noblewoman of the Renaissance.

== Life ==
She was the daughter of Edoardo Bueri, a member of a family of ancient lineage from Florence with economic interests in other cities; the family was in fact in Verona in the first half of the fourteenth century when she was born. She was married to the young banker Giovanni di Bicci de' Medici in 1386. She brought a dowry of 1500 florins to the marriage.

She was known for her beauty, but her husband was known for being ugly. The marriage brought respectability to Giovanni and their children, since he was not of noble descent. Just before he died, he asked her to take care of their children. She was buried with him after her death in the Old Sacristy of San Lorenzo.

Upon her death, Carlo Marsuppini wrote a eulogy in which he sang her praises, in which he compared the love between Piccarda and Giovanni with that of famous couples from antiquity. In it, he compared her with Penelope, Artemisia II of Caria, Julia and Porcia.

== Issue ==
By her marriage, she had at least five children:

- Cosimo di Giovanni de' Medici (1389–1464)
- Damiano di Giovanni de'Medici (d.1390). Most probably Cosimo's twin, died in infancy.
- Lorenzo di Giovanni de' Medici (1395–1440)
- Antonio di Giovanni de' Medici (b. circa 1398). Died young
- A daughter whose name is unknown. She died at her marriage's eve.

== Fictional Depictions ==
Bueri is portrayed by Frances Barber in the 2016 television series Medici: Masters of Florence.

== Sources ==
- Pernis, Maria Grazia; Adams, Laurie (2006). Lucrezia Tornabuoni de' Medici and the Medici family in the fifteenth century. New York: Peter Lang Publishing, Inc.
- Tomas, Natalie R. (2003). The Medici Women: Gender and Power in Renaissance Florence. Aldershot: Ashgate. ISBN 0754607771.
