= Salvestro de' Medici =

Official of Florence (c. 1331–1388)

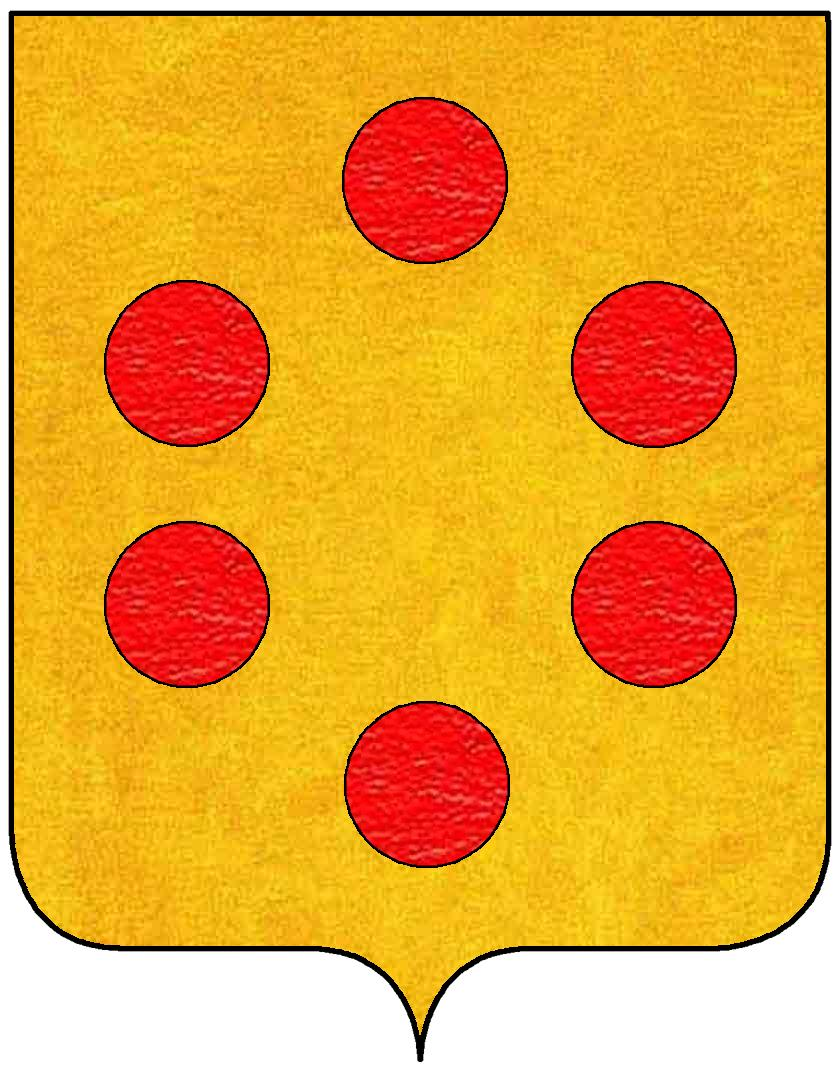
Coat of arms, Medici family

Salvestro di Alamanno de' Medici (c. 1331 – 1388) was a former Gonfaloniere and Provost of the city of Florence. Salvestro was a member of the patrician class and an adversary of the noble Guelphic faction, who had been pursuing a policy of attempting to exclude the lesser guilds through admonitions.

Salvestro was drawn as Gonfaloniere in the summer of 1378 and pursued an anti-Guelph policy, reviving laws which placed restrictions on the nobility, reducing the power of the Capitani di Parte and recalling the ammoniti (those who had been admonished). These laws encountered much opposition from the nobles, which led to their being threatened and in some cases their homes burnt in the beginning of the insurrection of the Ciompi, textile workers not represented by a guild.

On 21 July 1378, Salvestro, along with 63 other citizens, were created knights and soon afterwards, he was given the revenue of shops on the Old Bridge by the newly appointed Gonfaloniere of Justice, the wool comber Michele di Lando, a privilege later removed from Salvestro by the Ciompi themselves, suspicious of di Lando's perceived favour for citizens of the middle classes.

Salvestro was later crucial to the counter-revolution of the major and minor guilds and ruled in effect as a dictator before his exile in 1382, at which time the Guelph faction regained power and renewed the admonitions.

Salvestro was a second cousin twice removed of Giovanni di Bicci de' Medici, founder of the Medici dynasty.

== Descendants ==
He married Bartolomea Altoviti, member of the House of Altoviti. They had six children:

- Margerita, married Ranieri Squarcialupi
- Onofria, married Michele Ristori
- Niccolò, mayor of Sansepolcro during the first half of 1361
- Alamanno, married Margherita Covoni
- Gregorio
- Caterina, married Gabriello Panciatici
