= Luisa de' Medici =

Italian noblewoman (1477–1488)

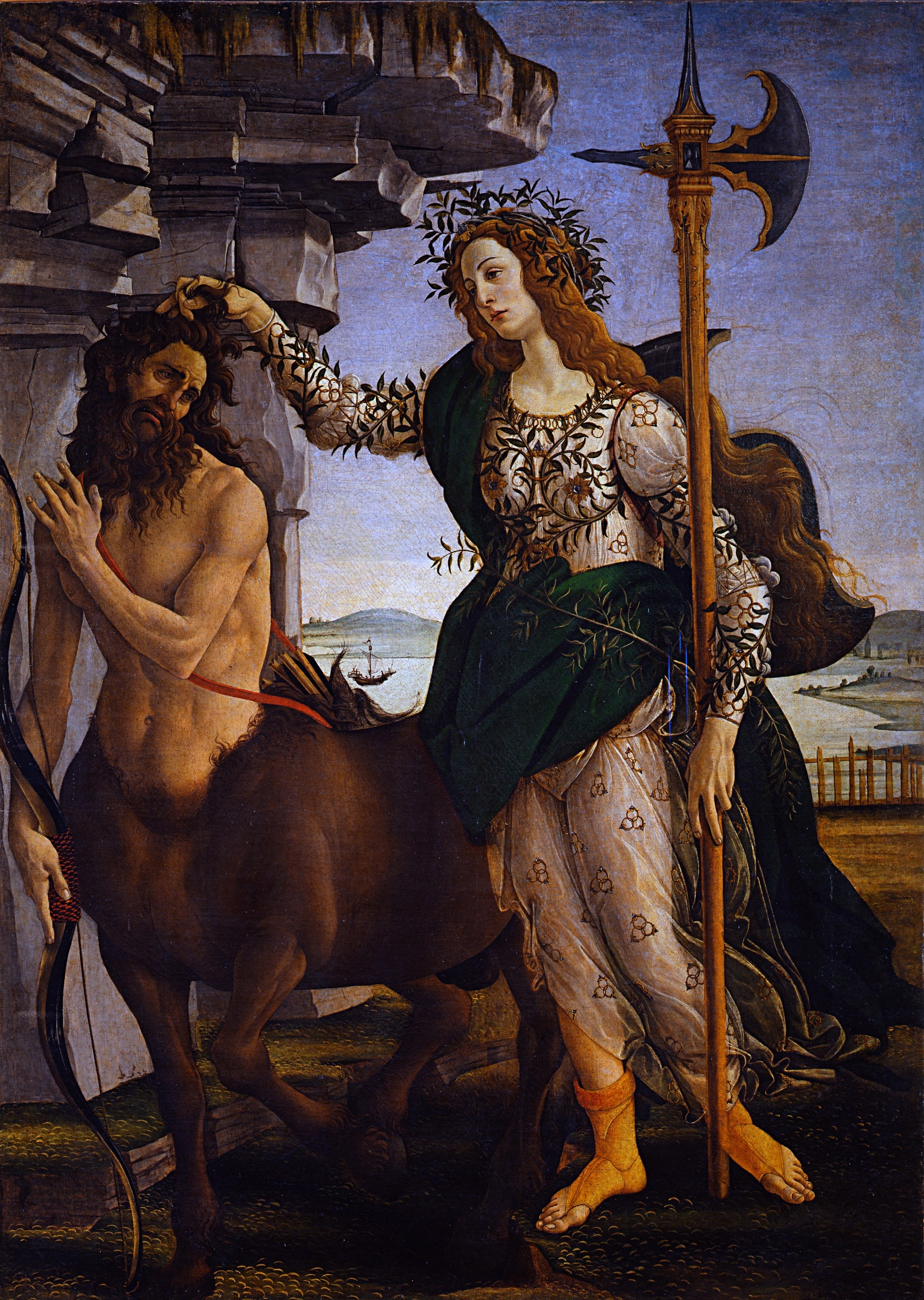
- Pallas and the Centaur, by Sandro Botticelli c. 1482. Minerva is inspired by Luisa de' Medici

- Coat of arms
- Full name: Luisa Contessina Romola di Lorenzo de' Medici, known as Luigia
- Born: 1477; Republic of Florence
- Died: 1488 (aged 10–11)
- Noble family: Medici
- Father: Lorenzo de' Medici
- Mother: Clarice Orsini

Luisa Contessina Romola di Lorenzo de' Medici, known as Luigia, (1477 – 1488) was an Italian noble. She was the eightborn and fourth daughter of Lorenzo de' Medici and Clarice Orsini. She was going to marry with her fiancé Giovanni di Pierfrancesco de' Medici, but she died in 1488 at the age of 11.

== Ancestry ==
Ancestors of Luisa de' Medici

16. Giovanni di Bicci de' Medici
8. Cosimo de' Medici
17. Piccarda Bueri
4. Piero di Cosimo de' Medici
18. Alessandro de' Bardi
9. Contessina de' Bardi
19. Emilia Pannocchieschi, Countess of Vernio
2. Lorenzo de' Medici
20. Simone Tornabuoni
10. Francesco Tornabuoni
5. Lucrezia Tornabuoni
21. Maso degli Alessandri
11. Selvaggia degli Alessandri
22 Nanna Cavalcanti
1. Luisa de' Medici
24. Francesco Orsini, Lord of Monterotondo
12. Orso Orsini, Lord of Monterotondo
25. Costanza Annibaldeschi
6. Jacopo Orsini, Lord of Monterotondo
26. Ildebrandino Conti
13. Lucrezia Conti
27. Caterina di Sangro
3. Clarice Orsini
28. Giovanni Orsini, Lord of Galera
14. Carlo Orsini, Lord of Bracciano
29. Bartolomea Spinelli
7. Maddalena Orsini, Lady of Bracciano
30. Giacomo Orsini, Count of Tagliacozzo
15. Paola Orsini, Countess of Tagliacozzo
31. Isabella Marzano
