= Lucrezia de' Medici (1470–1553) =

Italian noblewoman

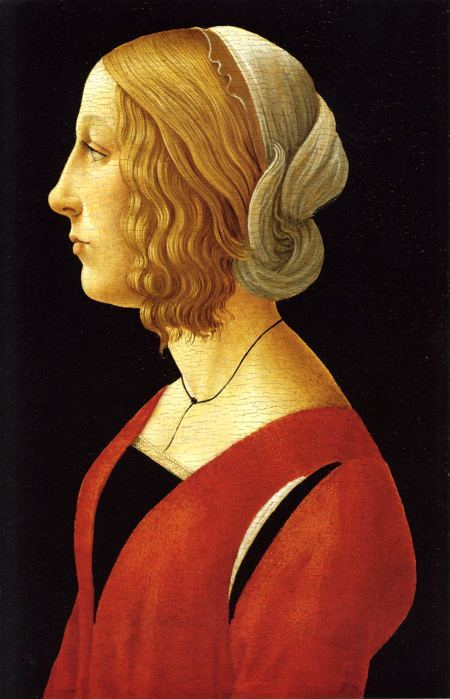
- Born: Lucrezia Maria Romola de' Medici; 4 August 1470; Republic of Florence
- Died: 15 November 1553 (aged 83)
- Noble family: Medici (by birth); Salviati (by marriage)
- Spouse: Jacopo Salviati
- Issue: Giovanni Salviati; Lorenzo Salviati; Piero Salviati; Elena Salviati; Caterina Salviati; Battista Salviati; Maria Salviati; Luisa Salviati; Francesca Salviati; Bernardo Salviati; Alamanno Salviati
- Father: Lorenzo de' Medici
- Mother: Clarice Orsini

Lucrezia Maria Romola de' Medici (4 August 1470 – between 10 and 15 November 1553) was an Italian noblewoman, the eldest daughter of Lorenzo de' Medici and Clarice Orsini and mother of Maria Salviati and Giovanni Salviati. Her portrait was considered (as a newborn) as the baby Jesus in Our Lady of the Magnificat of Sandro Botticelli.

== Life ==
She was married in February 1488 to Jacopo Salviati. She brought a dowry of 2,000 florins to the marriage. When her brothers were exiled from Florence, she was in a difficult spot, as Jacopo was a supporter of the new rulers. In August 1497 she spent 3,000 ducats to support a plot to return her brother Piero to power. When it failed, the men participating in the plot were executed, but Francesco Valori, the leader of Florence, could not consider harming a woman. She continued to work to build support for the Medici family, including negotiating the marriage of her niece, Clarice de' Medici (1493–1528), to Filippo Strozzi the Younger against the desires of the Florentine leaders. When her brother, Giuliano returned to Florence in 1512, he asked the advice of his sisters on how he should restructure the government.

In March 1513, her brother became Pope Leo X, and the Medicis held days of celebrations in Florence. Lucrezia and her siblings gave gifts and money to crowds outside the family palace. By 1514, Pope Leo had so drained the Vatican treasuries that he pawned the papal tiara (worth 44,000 ducats) to Lucrezia and her husband. Lucrezia began to have public disputes with her sister-in-law, Alfonsina Orsini, who was working to elevate her son, Lorenzo to Captain General and later Duke. She and her husband preferred that a group rule Florence, rather than an individual. Pope Leo appointed Lucrezia's son Giovanni a Cardinal in 1517. Lucrezia managed his household and office for him from 1524, particularly while he was travelling as a Papal Legate. She used that influence to help promote Medici causes in Rome. Lucrezia was with Pope Leo when he died.

In 1527, when the Medici were again exiled from Florence, Jacopo wound up a prisoner of Charles V, Holy Roman Emperor along with Lucrezia's cousin, Pope Clement VII. Lucrezia worked to gather a ransom and get her husband released. She and her husband opposed Pope Clement's decision to marry their grand-niece Catherine de' Medici to the future Henry II of France, claiming that such an important Medici heir should marry within Italy.

Jacopo died in 1533. Lucrezia outlived him by twenty years. Lucrezia's exact death date is unknown, but it is estimated that she died between 10 and 15 November 1553, having outlived at least eight of her adult children. She was 83 years old.

== Patronage ==
In 1520, Pope Leo X asked her to help support convents in Florence. She paid for a significant expansion of the convent of San Giorgio, funding new dormitories, cloisters, and workshops. She built other chapels in 1530 in Rome. She and Giovanni later worked together to pay for a chapel in Rome which would also serve as a resting place for the family. In November 1520, she exchanged messages with Filippo Nerli and Niccolò Machiavelli about editing a biography of Alexander the Great. She was a patron of Girolamo Benivieni. Together, she and Benivieni petitioned her brother Pope Leo X to support their effort to bring the body of Dante Alighieri to his home town of Florence.

== Issue ==
By Salviati, she had eleven children, six sons and five daughters, some of whom were of great importance to the history of Renaissance Europe:

- Cardinal Giovanni Salviati (24 March 1490 – 28 October 1553)
- Lorenzo Salviati (8 July 1492 – 16 July 1539), senator and patron
- Caterina Salviati (1493–1535), married in 1511 Filippo Nerli, Florentine historical
- Elena Salviati (1495–1552), married the Marquis Pallavicino Pallavicino and second marriage to the Prince Iacopo V Appiani in Appiano
- Piero Salviati (1496–1523)
- Baptist Salviati (1498–1524)
- Maria Salviati (17 July 1499 – 29 December 1543), married to Lodovico de' Medici. This marriage united the main branch and Popolano branch of the Medici family. His son, Cosimo I, was named to lead Florence after the death of Duke Alessandro de' Medici
- Luisa Salviati (1500), married Sigismund de Luna and Peralta
- Francesca Salviati (23 August 1504 – 11 June 1536), married first to Piero Gualterotti (they had a daughter Maria who married Filippo Salviati) and second, in 1533, to Ottaviano de' Medici, by whom she had a son Pope Leo XI
- Bernardo Salviati (17 February 1508 – 6 May 1568) knight of the Order of St. John of Jerusalem; served Catherine de' Medici in France; 1561 Cardinal
- Alamanno (1510–1571), patrician

== Ancestry ==
Ancestors of Lucrezia de' Medici (1470–1553)

16. Giovanni de' Medici
8. Cosimo de' Medici
17. Piccarda Bueri
4. Piero the Gouty
18. Alessandro de' Bardi
9. Contessina de' Bardi
2. Lorenzo de' Medici
20. Simone Tornabuoni
10. Francesco di Simone Tornabuoni
5. Lucrezia Tornabuoni
22. Niccolo Guicciardini
11. Nanna di Niccolo di Luigi Guicciardini
1. Lucrezia de' Medici
24. Francesco Orsini, Lord of Monterotondo
12. Orso Orsini, Lord of Monterotondo
25. Costanza Annibaldeschi
6. Jacopo Orsini, Lord of Monterotondo
13. Lucrezia Conti
3. Clarissa Orsini
28. Giovanni Orsini, Lord of Bracciano
14. Carlo Orsini, Lord of Bracciano
29. Bartolomea Spinelli
7. Maddalena Orsini
30. Giacomo Orsini, Count of Tagliacozzo
15. Paola Orsini
31. Isabella Marzano

== Sources ==
- Tomas, Natalie R. (2003). The Medici Women: Gender and Power in Renaissance Florence. Aldershot: Ashgate. ISBN 0754607771.
