= List of heads of state of Florence =

Lords and Dukes of Florence (1434–1569)

Lords and Dukes of the Florentine Republic
- Medicean Coat of Arms
- Creation date: 6 October 1434
- First holder: Cosimo de' Medici (de facto Lord)
- Last holder: Cosimo I de' Medici (Duke)
- Extinction date: 21 August 1569

The first de facto Lord (Italian: Signore) in the history of the Republic of Florence was Cosimo de' Medici. Thanks to his moderate policy, Cosimo managed to maintain power for over thirty years until his death, ruling the state silently through his trusted men and thus allowing the consolidation of his family, the Medici, in the government of Florence.

In 1532, to reinforce and formalize the Medici rule in Florence, Pope Clement VII, himself a Medici, created the title of Duke of the Florentine Republic to Alessandro de' Medici. With the creation of the new title it abolished the age-old signoria (elective government) and the office of gonfaloniere (titular head-of-state elected for a two-month term) and replaced it with three institutions: the consigliere, the Senate and the Council of Two Hundred.

== Background ==
From its creation in the 12th century until the first decades of the 15th century, the city-state of Florence was ruled by a series of republican governments, such as the Consul, Podestà and most notably by a council known as the Signoria of Florence. The signoria was chosen by the gonfaloniere (titular ruler of the city), who was elected every two months by Florentine guild members. Not having until that moment fallen into the hands of powerful dynasties as happened in several other Italian states. This situation completely changed with the rise of the Medici family, in that period owners of the largest European bank, and the wealthiest family of that era, which made the dynasty accumulate immense influence in the city, even without holding public offices.

== Medici lords of Florence, 1434–1494 ==
Portrait	Name	Lifespan	Reign	Consorts	Succession
	Cosimo de' Medici	27 September 1389 – 1 August 1464	6 October 1434 – 1 August 1464	Contessina de' Bardi c. 1415; 2 sons	First de facto Lord of Florence
	Piero I the Gouty	1414 – 2 December 1469	1 August 1464 – 3 December 1469	Lucrezia Tornabuoni; 3 June 1444; 5 children	Son of Cosimo
	Lorenzo I the Magnificent	1 January 1449 – 8 April 1492	2 December 1469 – 8 April 1492	Clarice Orsini; 4 June 1469; 10 children	Son of Piero
	Giuliano I de' Medici	25 October 1453 – 26 April 1478	2 December 1469 – 26 April 1478	Fioretta Gorini; Never married 1 son	Son of Piero and co-ruler with Lorenzo
	Piero II the Unfortunate	15 February 1471 – 28 December 1503	9 April 1492 – 9 November 1494	Alfonsina Orsini; February 1488; Rome; 2 children	Son of Lorenzo, was deposed and exiled

== Republic of Florence, 1494–1512 ==
Portrait	Name	From	To	Note
	Girolamo Savonarola	1494	1498	Inspired reform around Florence, was condemned a heretic and was simultaneously hanged and burned at the stake in the middle of the piazza.
	Piero Soderini	1498	1512	was declared Gonfaloniere of Justice ("Standard Bearer") for life, fled Florence after the Medici conquest

== Medici lords of Florence, 1512–1532 ==
Portrait	Name	Lifespan	Reign	Consorts	Succession
	Cardinal Giovanni de' Medici	11 December 1475 – 1 December 1521	31 August 1512 – 9 March 1513	Never married	Son of Lorenzo, later became Pope Leo X
	Giuliano II de' Medici	12 March 1479 – 17 March 1516	9 March 1513 – 17 March 1516	Filiberta of Savoy; 22 February 1515; Paris no issue 1 illegitimate son	Son of Lorenzo
	Lorenzo de' Medici	12 September 1492 – 4 May 1519	17 March 1516 – 4 May 1519	Madeleine de La Tour d'Auvergne; 5 May 1518; Château d'Amboise, Amboise; 1 daughter 1 illegitimate son	Son of Piero the Unfortunate
	Cardinal Giulio de' Medici	26 May 1478 – 25 September 1534	4 May 1519 – 19 November 1523	Never married	Son of Giuliano de Medici, later became Pope Clement VII
	Ippolito de' Medici	1511 – 10 August 1535	19 November 1523 – 16 May 1527	Never married	Illegitimate son of Giuliano II de Medici
	Alessandro de' Medici	22 July 1510 – 6 January 1537	16 May 1527 – 1530	Margaret of Parma; 13 June 1536; Florence no issue 3 illegitimate children	Illegitimate son of Lorenzo II de Medici

After the Sack of Rome, Florence overthrew the Medicis once more and briefly became a republic until Pope Clement VII signed a peace treaty with Charles V, Holy Roman Emperor who then invaded Florence and restored the Medicis.

Portrait	Name	Lifespan	Reign	Consorts	Succession
	Alessandro de' Medici	22 July 1510 – 6 January 1537	5 July 1531 – 1 May 1532	Margaret of Parma; 13 June 1536; Florence no issue 3 illegitimate children	Illegitimate son of Lorenzo II de Medici

== Medici dukes of Florence, 1532–1569 ==
Portrait	Name	Lifespan	Reign	Consorts	Succession
	Alessandro de' Medici	22 July 1510 – 6 January 1537	1 May 1532 – 6 January 1537	Margaret of Parma; 13 June 1536; Florence no issue 3 illegitimate children	Illegitimate son of Lorenzo II de Medici
	Cosimo I de' Medici	12 June 1519 – 21 April 1574	6 January 1537 – 21 August 1569	(1) Eleanor of Toledo; 29 June 1539; Florence; 11 children (2) Camilla Martelli; 1570; 1 daughter	Son of Giovanni dalle Bande Nere, later became the first Grand Duke of Tuscany.

== See also ==
- Grand Duchy of Tuscany
- History of Tuscany
- List of grand dukes of Tuscany
- List of Tuscan consorts
- March of Tuscany#Margraves of Tuscany, 812–1197

== Bibliography ==
- "Medici, De'". Encarta Encyclopedie Winkler Prins (in Dutch). Microsoft Corporation/Het Spectrum. 2002.
