= Giuliano de' Medici, Duke of Nemours =

Lord of Florence from 1513 to 1516

Giuliano de' Medici
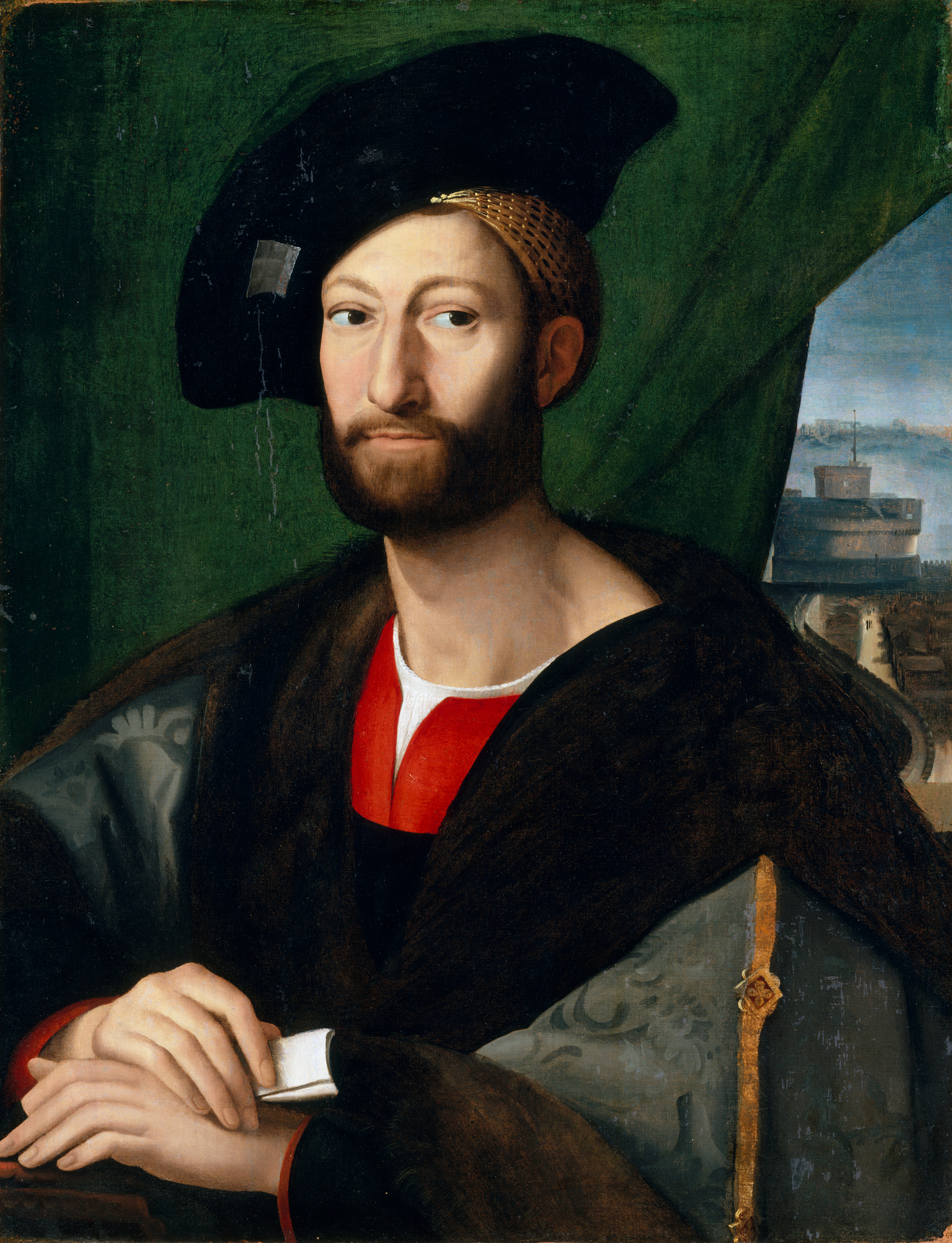
- Portrait of Giuliano de' Medici, after Raphael.

Lord of Florence
- Reign: 9 March 1513 – 17 March 1516
- Predecessor: Giovanni di Lorenzo de' Medici
- Successor: Lorenzo ΙΙ de' Medici
- Born: 12 March 1479; Florence, Republic of Florence
- Died: 17 March 1516 (aged 37); Florence, Republic of Florence
- Noble family: Medici
- Spouse: Filiberta of Savoy
- Issue: Ippolito de' Medici (illegitimate)
- Father: Lorenzo I de' Medici
- Mother: Clarice Orsini

Giuliano di Lorenzo de' Medici (12 March 1479 – 17 March 1516) was an Italian nobleman, the third son of Lorenzo the Magnificent, and a ruler of Florence.

== Biography ==
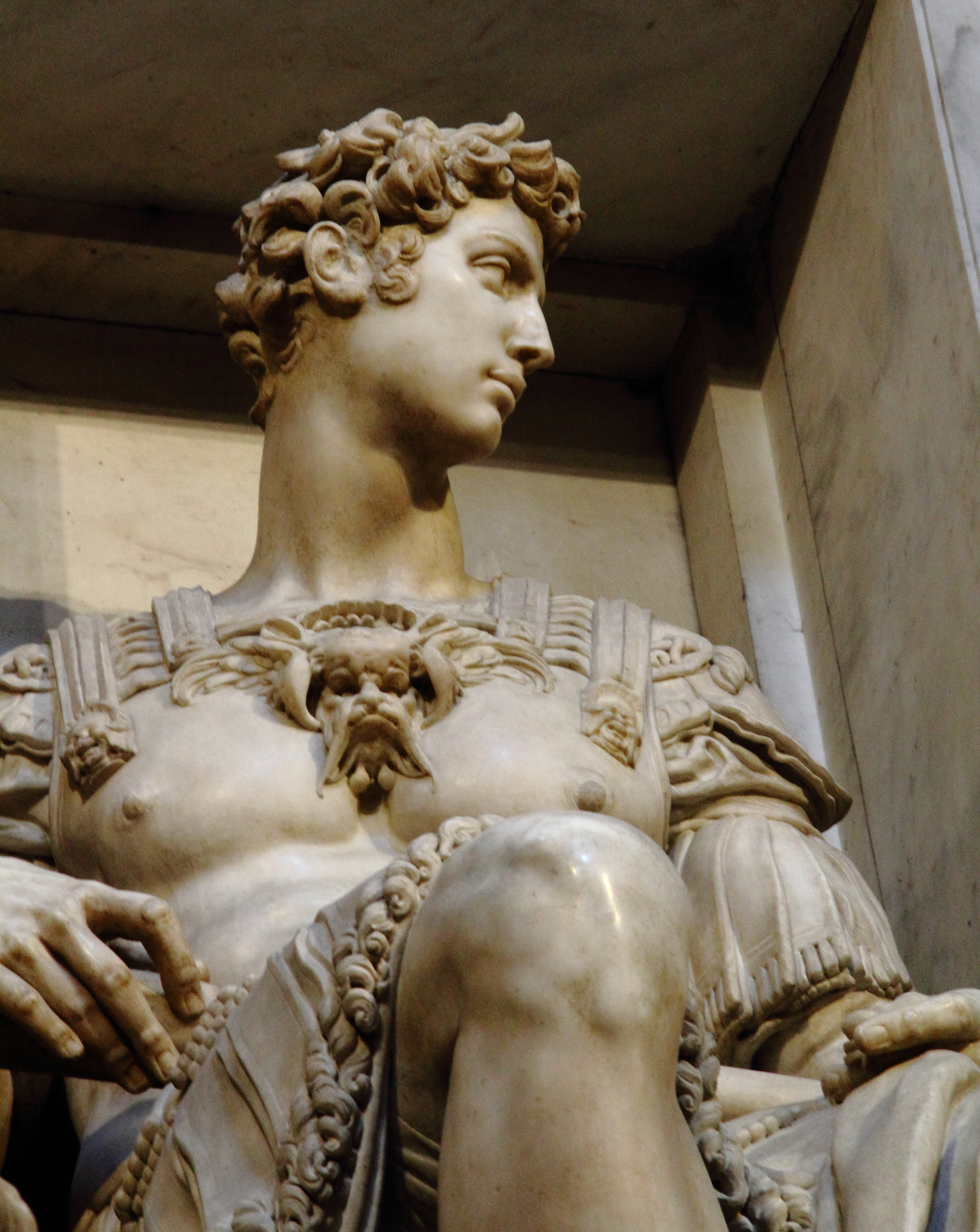
Giuliano's statue in the Medici Chapel, created by Michelangelo

Born in Florence, he was raised with his brothers Piero and Giovanni di Lorenzo de' Medici, who became Pope Leo X; as well as his cousin Giulio de' Medici, who became Pope Clement VII.

His older brother Piero was briefly the ruler of Florence after Lorenzo's death, until the republican faction drove out the Medici in 1494. Giuliano moved, therefore, to Venice. The Medici family was restored to power after the Holy League drove the French forces that had supported the Florentine republicans from Italy. This effort was headed by Spain with the support of Pope Julius II. Giuliano reigned in Florence following his brother's election to the papacy in 1513, until he died in 1516 from pulmonary tuberculosis at Badia Fiesolana.

He married Philiberta (1498–1524), daughter of Philip II, Duke of Savoy, on 22 February 1515 at the court of France, thanks to the intercession of his brother Giovanni, now pope as Leo X, in the same year that King Francis I of France (Filiberta's nephew) invested him with the title Duke of Nemours (which had recently reverted once again to the French crown) on the occasion. The French were apparently grooming him for the throne of Naples (in which the French maintained a historical interest), when Giuliano died prematurely. He was succeeded in Florence by his nephew Lorenzo II de' Medici.

Giuliano left a single illegitimate son, Ippolito de' Medici, who became a cardinal.

His portrait, painted in Rome by Raphael (a painter favoured by Leo), shows Rome's Castel Sant'Angelo behind a curtain. (A studio version is at the Metropolitan Museum of Art.)

Giuliano's tomb in the Medici Chapel of the Church of San Lorenzo, Florence, is ornamented with the Night and Day of Michelangelo, along with a statue of Giuliano by Michelangelo. He shares an identical common name (Giuliano de' Medici) with his uncle Giuliano di Piero de' Medici, whose tomb is also in the Medici Chapel and who is famous for having been assassinated in the Pazzi Conspiracy.

== Ancestry ==
Ancestors of Giuliano de' Medici, Duke of Nemours

8. Cosimo de' Medici
4. Piero the Gouty
9. Contessina de' Bardi
2. Lorenzo de' Medici
10. Francesco di Simone Tornabuoni
5. Lucrezia Tornabuoni
11. Nanna di Niccolo di Luigi Guicciardini
1. Giuliano de' Medici
12. Orso Orsini, Lord of Monterotondo
6. Jacopo Orsini, Lord of Monterotondo
13. Lucrezia Conti
3. Clarissa Orsini
14. Carlo Orsini, Lord of Bracciano
7. Maddalena Orsini
15. Paola Orsini

== Sources ==
- Kemp, Martin (2006). Leonardo Da Vinci. Oxford University Press.
- Jungić, Josephine (2018). Anne Leader (ed.). Giuliano de'Medici: Machiavelli's Prince in Life and Art. Montreal: McGill-Queen's University Press. ISBN 978-0773553200.
