= Gentile de' Becchi =

Italian diplomat and writer from Florence

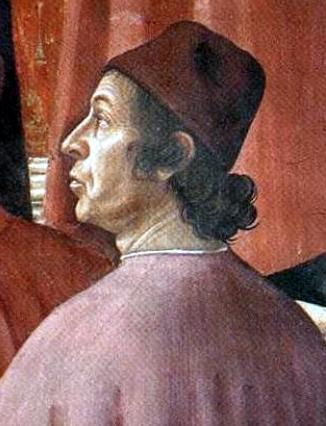
Probable portrait of Gentile Becchi portrayed by Domenico Ghirlandaio in the Tornabuoni Chapel.

Gentile de' Becchi (1420/1430 – 1497) was an Italian bishop, diplomat, orator and writer. He was a member of the Platonic Academy of the Medici of Florence and tutor of Lorenzo the Magnificent and his son Giovanni de' Medici, later Pope Leo X. Of his writings there exist many letters, poems in Latin, and prayers which are praised by historian Cecil Grayson as his finest works.

== Early life and priesthood ==
Gentile de' Becchi was born in Urbino, the son of Giorgio Becchi, member of a family traditionally linked to the powerful Florentine Medici dynasty. Both the year of his birth and the place of his early studies are unknown.

As a priest, in 1450, with the support of the Medici, he was appointed to the parish of San Giovanni in Florence. He became a canon of Pisa Cathedral and in 1462, he became canonical prebend of Florence Cathedral, controlling the finances of the diocese for Archbishop Giovanni Neroni, and holding benefices in Decimo, Cascina and Fagna.

In 1473, Lorenzo de' Medici, as '’de facto'’ ruler of Florence, proposed him as Bishop of Arezzo. According to historian Cecil Grayson, although de' Becchi's appointment as Bishop had been orchestrated by Lorenzo, both the Archbishop of Florence and Pope Sixtus IV held him in high esteem for his devotion to the faith, his knowledge, his abilities and his character. Despite his close association with Florence and the Medici family, de' Becchi did not neglect his obligations to Arezzo. He supported the founding of a convent of Poor Clares in the city, licensed the Olivetans to build a church and monastery, and made improvements to the Bishop's palace.

== Humanist and teacher ==
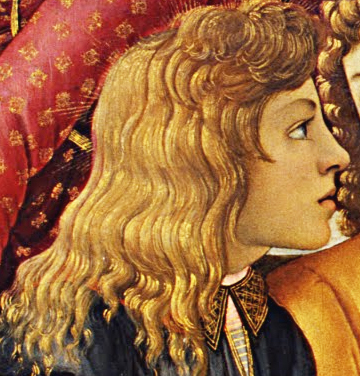
Gentile de' Becchi's pupil, Lorenzo the Magnificent, as a child, in a painting by Botticelli

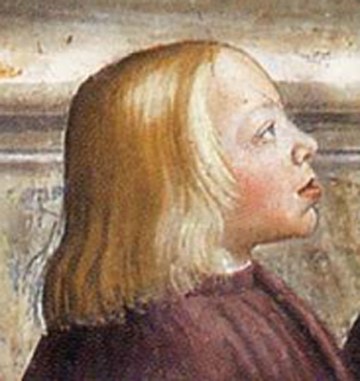
Giovanni, Pope Leo X, as a child, in a fresco by Domenico Ghirlandaio

In 1454, Gentile was chosen by Piero di Cosimo de' Medici as tutor to his sons, the future Lorenzo the Magnificent and his brother Giuliano. In 1466, he accompanied Lorenzo de' Medici on an ambassadorial mission to Pope Paul II. The following year, Gentile accompanied Lorenzo's mother, Lucrezia Tornabuoni, to Rome, to negotiate agreements with the powerful Orsini family in order to arrange betrothal of Clarice Orsini to Lorenzo. Gentile de' Becchi then returned to Rome in April 1469, to accompany Clarice to Florence for her marriage.

Gentile became a prominent member of the Medici Academy, alongside the philosophers Marsilio Ficino, Cristoforo Landino, Agnolo Poliziano and Pico della Mirandola. He was known as a poet, as well as a theologian and orator, and communicated with other poets and humanists including Cardinal Jacopo Piccolomini-Ammannati, Francesco Filelfo, and Donato Acciaiuoli. Agnolo Poliziano dedicated his ode Del Lungo, written in the wake of the Pazzi conspiracy, to de' Becchi.

In 1489, Lorenzo chose Gentile as tutor of his second son, Giovanni de' Medici, who had started on an ecclesiastical career in agreement with Pope Innocent VIII. While Lorenzo's wife, Clarice Orsini, who did not share her husband's Platonic ideals, was happy to have the Bishop of Arezzo tutor her son, and wanted him to be given exercises out of the psalter, it caused conflict with Poliziano, of whom she was deeply suspicious. Giovanni was made a cardinal at thirteen and at thirty-eight succeeded Pope Julius II as Pope Leo X.

== Pazzi conspiracy ==
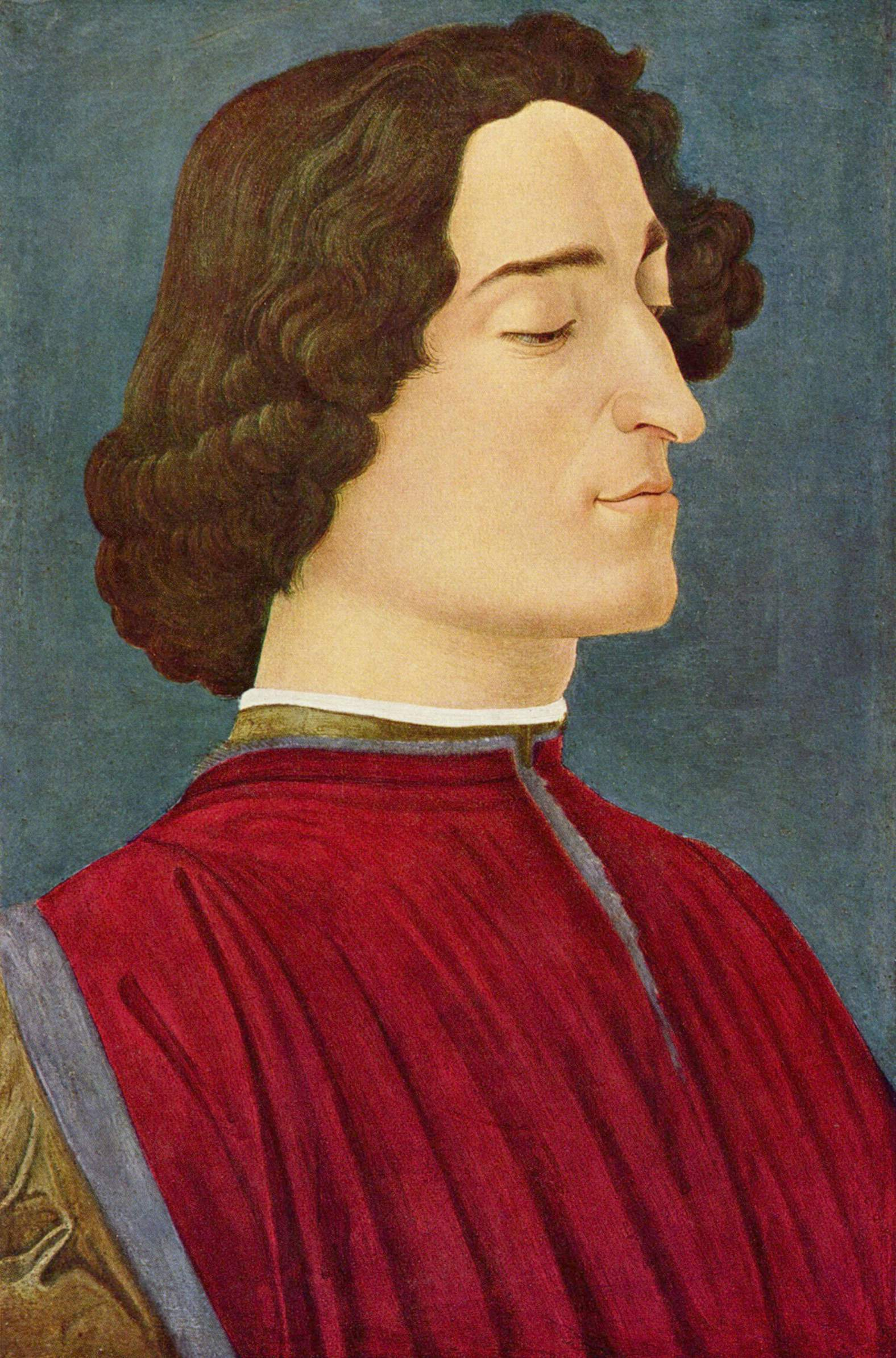
Giuliano de' Medici died in the Pazzi conspiracy. Botticelli (1478)

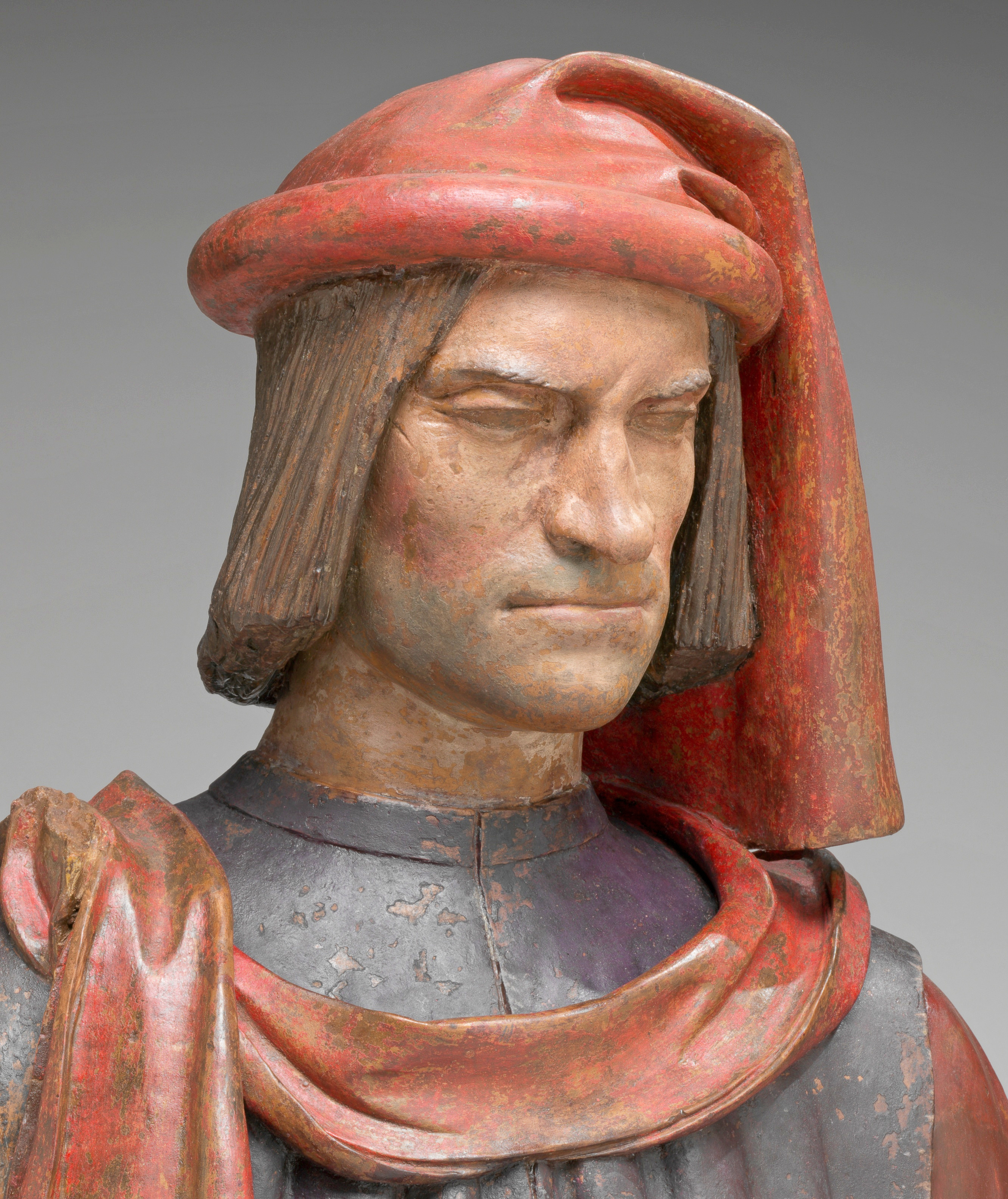
Lorenzo de' Medici became Gentile de' Becchi's patron. Verrocchio (1480)

In 1478, the Pazzi conspiracy, involving members of the Florentine Pazzi family, and sanctioned by Pope Sixtus IV (a member of the della Rovere family) resulted in an attack on Easter Sunday, which left Lorenzo de' Medici wounded and his brother, the popular Giuliano, dead. Violent reprisals broke out in Florence with members and associates of the Pazzi family killed, including the Archbishop of Pisa, Francesco Salviati, a relative of Pope Sixtus, who was condemned to death and hanged. The Pope responded by arresting the Florentine ambassador, excommunicating Lorenzo de' Medici and the Signoria (Town Council) and forbidding the Florentine clergy from practising.

Gentile de' Becchi, as Bishop of Arezzo, stood by the Medici, breaking the interdict launched by Pope Sixtus IV against the Florentine clergy. With the archbishop Rinaldo Orsini, he convened a synod of the local clergy and succeeded in returning the normal spiritual and ecclesiastical life to the City of Florence. At the synod, de' Becchi delivered a speech in which he refuted all the arguments put forward by the Pope for the sanctions, and accused the Pope Sixtus of being behind the attack, in order to bring Florence under his control. The speech was immediately printed by Niccolò della Magna and circulated. It is probable that for this reason Gentile de' Becchi's proposal as cardinal was rejected by the Pope.

In 1481, Sixtus commissioned a team of painters including Florentines Botticelli and Domenico Ghirlandaio to take part in the painting of a series of narrative frescos in the Sistine Chapel. This was part of healing the breach between Florence and the Vatican.

== Ambassador ==
Gentile de' Becchi's oratorial skills made him the chosen representative of the Republic of Florence on a number of diplomatic missions, besides his role in making peace after the Pazzi conspiracy. He occupied this role both under Lorenzo and his son Piero di Lorenzo de' Medici, who succeeded his father on his death in March 1492. In 1483 Gentile went to France to bear greetings to Charles VIII after his coronation. In 1485, he went on behalf of Florence to negotiate with Pope Innocent VIII over hostilities with Ferdinand II of Aragon. In 1492, he was sent by Piero to bear greetings to the newly elected Pope Alexander VI. In 1493 and 1494, he was in France with Piero Soderini negotiating peace between Florence and Charles VIII who was planning to invade Italy. Imprudent actions by Piero, who was known as "Piero the Unfortunate", towards the French king angered the Florentines and on 9 November 1494, Piero was forced to flee to the safety of Bologna, leaving the Medici Palace to be ransacked by an angry mob.

== Death ==
Gentile did not return to Florence after the exile of the Medici. He lived until his death at Villa alle Botte, and died, in 1497, in Arezzo, where his body was buried in Arezzo Cathedral.

== Bibliography ==
- Brucker, Gene A., Renaissance Florence, John Wiley and Sons, (1969) ISBN 0-471-11370-0
- Grayson, Cecil, Gentile de' Becchi, Dizionario Biografico degli Italiani – Volume 7 (1970) (accessed 2014-05-20)
- Mediateca di Palazzo Medici Riccardi: Gentile de' Becchi, (accessed 2014-05-15)
- Pottinger, George, The Court of the Medici, Croom Helm Ltd. London, (1978) ISBN 0-85664-605-9
- Williamson, Hugh Ross, Lorenzo the Magnificent. Michael Joseph, London. (1974) ISBN 0-7181-1204-0
