= Lorenzo de' Medici =

Ruler of Florence from 1469 to 1492

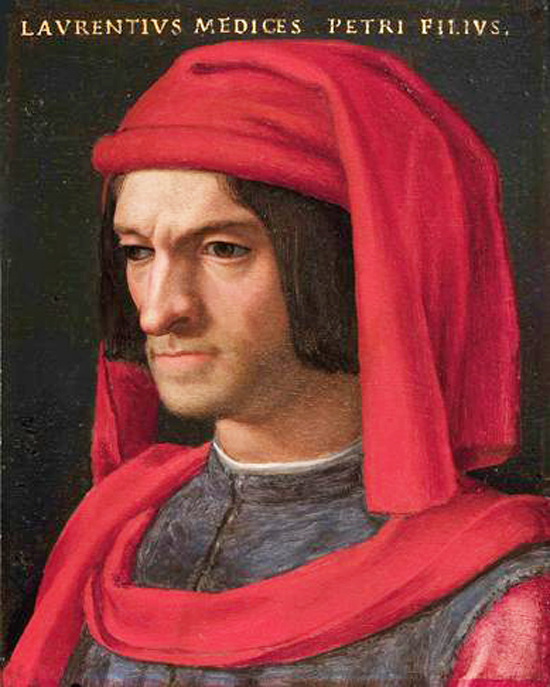
- A posthumous portrait dating from the late 1560s (formerly attributed to Bronzino)

Lord of Florence
- Reign: 2 December 1469 – 8 April 1492
- Predecessor: Piero the Gouty
- Successor: Piero the Unfortunate
- Full name: Lorenzo di Piero de' Medici
- Known for: Political leadership; banking; patronage of the arts
- Born: 1 January 1449; Florence, Republic of Florence
- Died: 8 April 1492 (aged 43); Careggi, Republic of Florence
- Noble family: Medici
- Spouse: Clarice Orsini
- Issue: Lucrezia de' Medici; Male twins; Piero de' Medici; Maddalena de' Medici; Contessina Beatrice de' Medici; Giovanni de' Medici, Pope Leo X; Luisa de' Medici; Contessina de' Medici; Giuliano de' Medici, Duke of Nemours
- Father: Piero the Gouty
- Mother: Lucrezia Tornabuoni

Lorenzo di Piero de' Medici (Italian: [loˈrɛntso de ˈmɛːditʃi]; 1 January 1449 – 8 April 1492), known as Lorenzo the Magnificent (Italian: Lorenzo il Magnifico), was a statesman, de facto ruler of the Florentine Republic, and the most powerful patron of Renaissance culture. Lorenzo held the balance of power within the Italic League, an alliance of states that stabilized political conditions on the Italian Peninsula for decades, and his life coincided with the mature phase of the Italian Renaissance and the golden age of Florence. As a patron, he is best known for his sponsorship of artists such as Botticelli and Michelangelo. On the foreign policy front, Lorenzo manifested a clear plan to stem the territorial ambitions of Pope Sixtus IV, in the name of the balance of the Italic League of 1454. For these reasons, Lorenzo was the subject of the Pazzi conspiracy (1478), in which his brother Giuliano was assassinated. The Peace of Lodi of 1454 that he supported among the various Italian states collapsed with his death. He is buried in the Medici Chapel in Florence.

== Youth ==
Lorenzo's grandfather, Cosimo de' Medici, was the first member of the Medici family to lead the Republic of Florence and run the Medici Bank simultaneously. As one of the wealthiest men in Europe, the elder Cosimo spent a very large portion of his fortune on government and philanthropy, for example as a patron of the arts and financier of public works. Lorenzo's father, Piero di Cosimo de' Medici, was equally at the centre of Florentine civic life, chiefly as an art patron and collector, while Lorenzo's uncle, Giovanni di Cosimo de' Medici, took care of the family's business interests. Lorenzo's mother, Lucrezia Tornabuoni, was a writer of sonnets and a friend to poets and philosophers of the Medici Academy. She became her son's advisor after the deaths of his father and uncle.

Lorenzo, considered the most promising of the five children of Piero and Lucrezia, was tutored by a diplomat and bishop, Gentile de' Becchi, and the humanist philosopher Marsilio Ficino, and he was trained in Greek by pivotal Renaissance scholar John Argyropoulos. With his brother Giuliano, he participated in jousting, hawking, hunting, and horse breeding for the Palio, a horse race in Siena. In 1469, aged 20, he won first prize in a jousting tournament sponsored by the Medici. The joust was the subject of a poem written by Luigi Pulci. Niccolò Machiavelli also wrote of the occasion that he won "not by way of favour, but by his own valour and skill in arms". He carried a banner painted by Verrocchio, and his horse was named Morello di Vento.

Piero sent Lorenzo on many important diplomatic missions when he was still a youth, including trips to Rome to meet the pope and other important religious and political figures.

Lorenzo was described as rather plain of appearance and of average height, having a broad frame and short legs, dark hair and eyes, a squashed nose, short-sighted eyes and a harsh voice. Giuliano, on the other hand, was regarded as handsome and a "golden boy", and was used as a model by Botticelli in his painting of Mars and Venus. Even Lorenzo's close friend Niccolo Valori described him as homely, saying, "nature had been a stepmother to him in regards to his personal appearance, although she had acted as a loving mother in all things concocted with the mind. His complexion was dark, and although his face was not handsome it was so full of dignity as to compel respect."

Paintings by Botticelli that use the Medici family as models

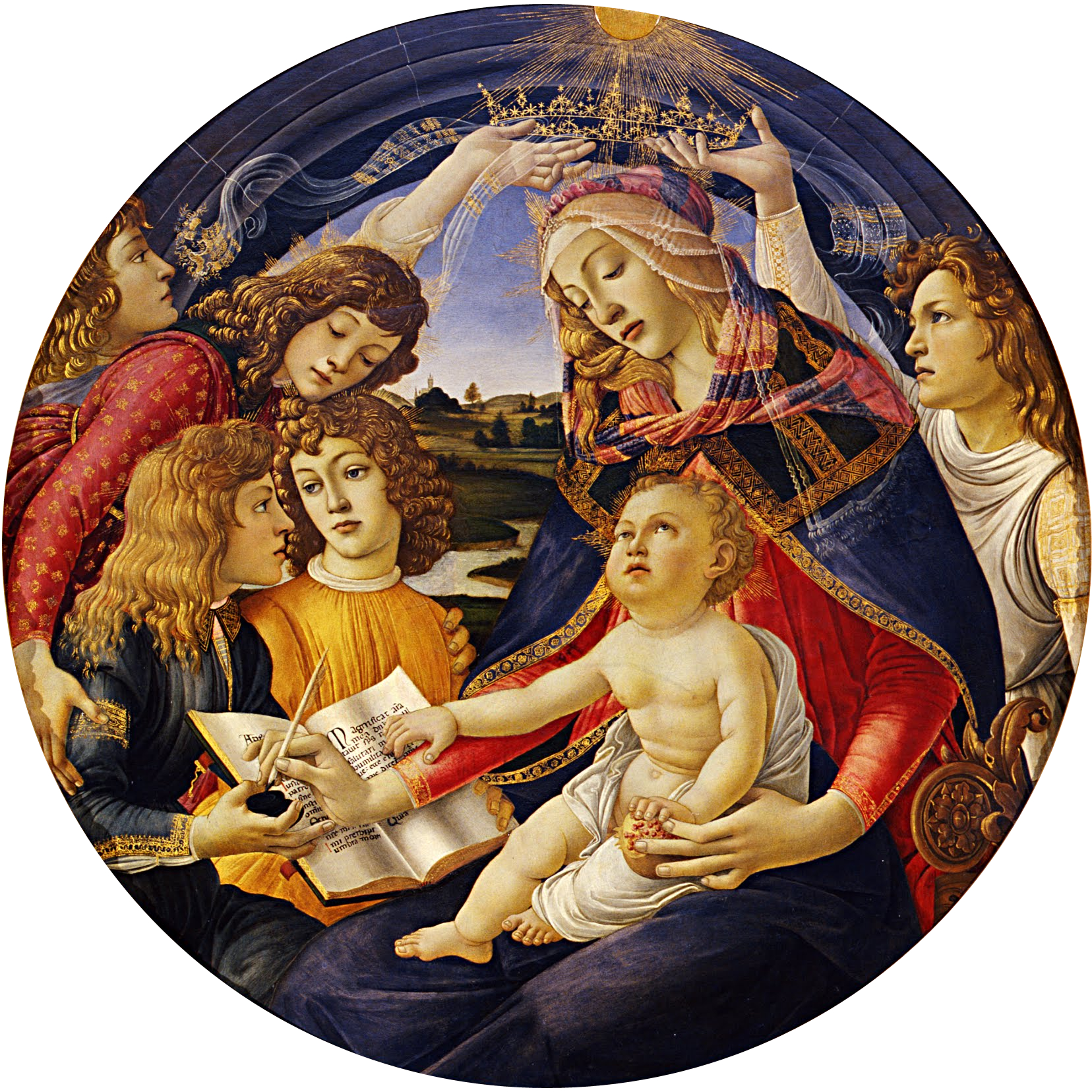
Madonna of the Magnificat shows Lucrezia Tornabuoni as the Madonna surrounded by her children, with Lorenzo holding a pot of ink.

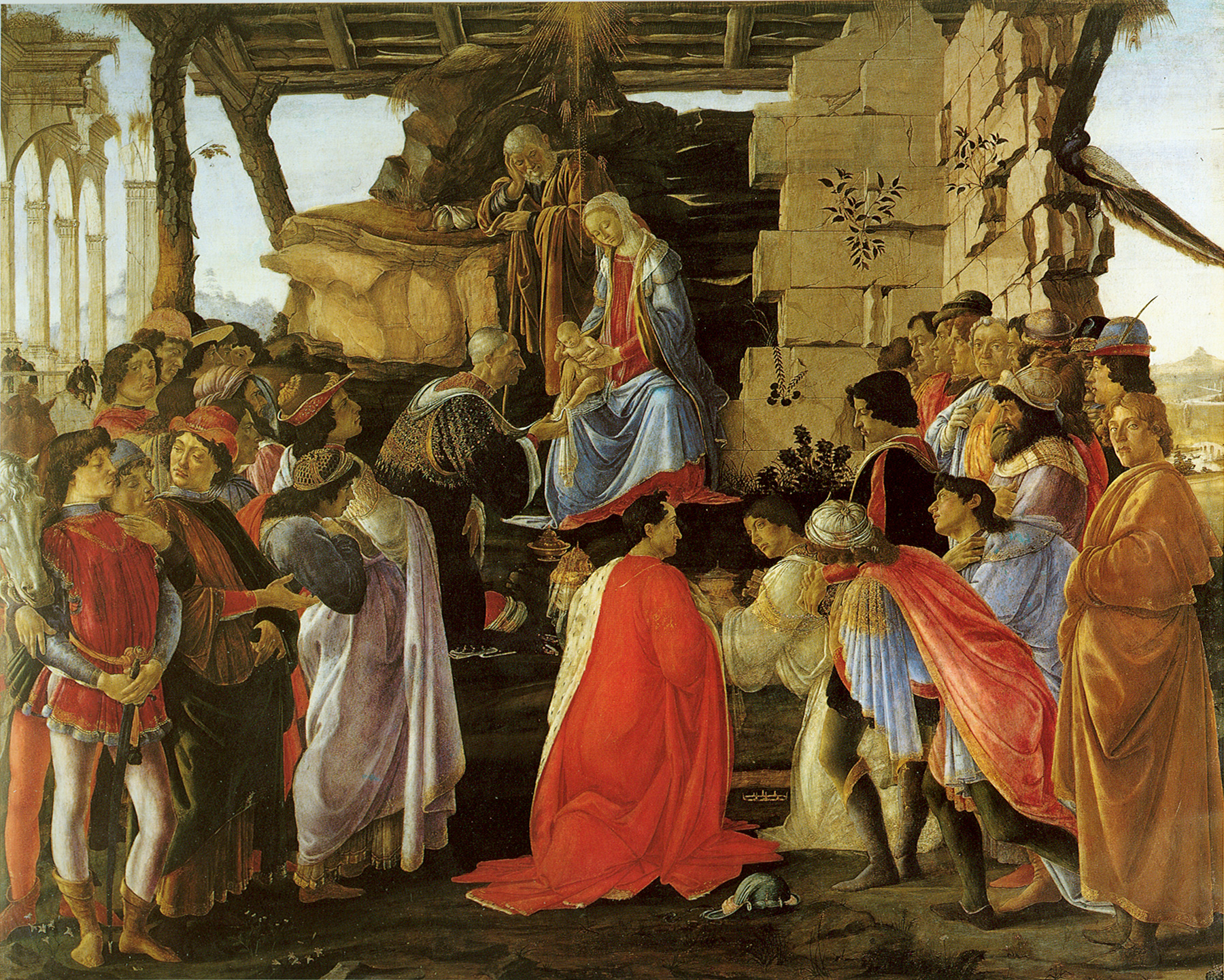
The Adoration of the Magi includes several generations of the Medici family and their retainers. Sixteen-year-old Lorenzo is to the left, with his horse, prior to his departure on a diplomatic mission to Milan.

== Politics ==
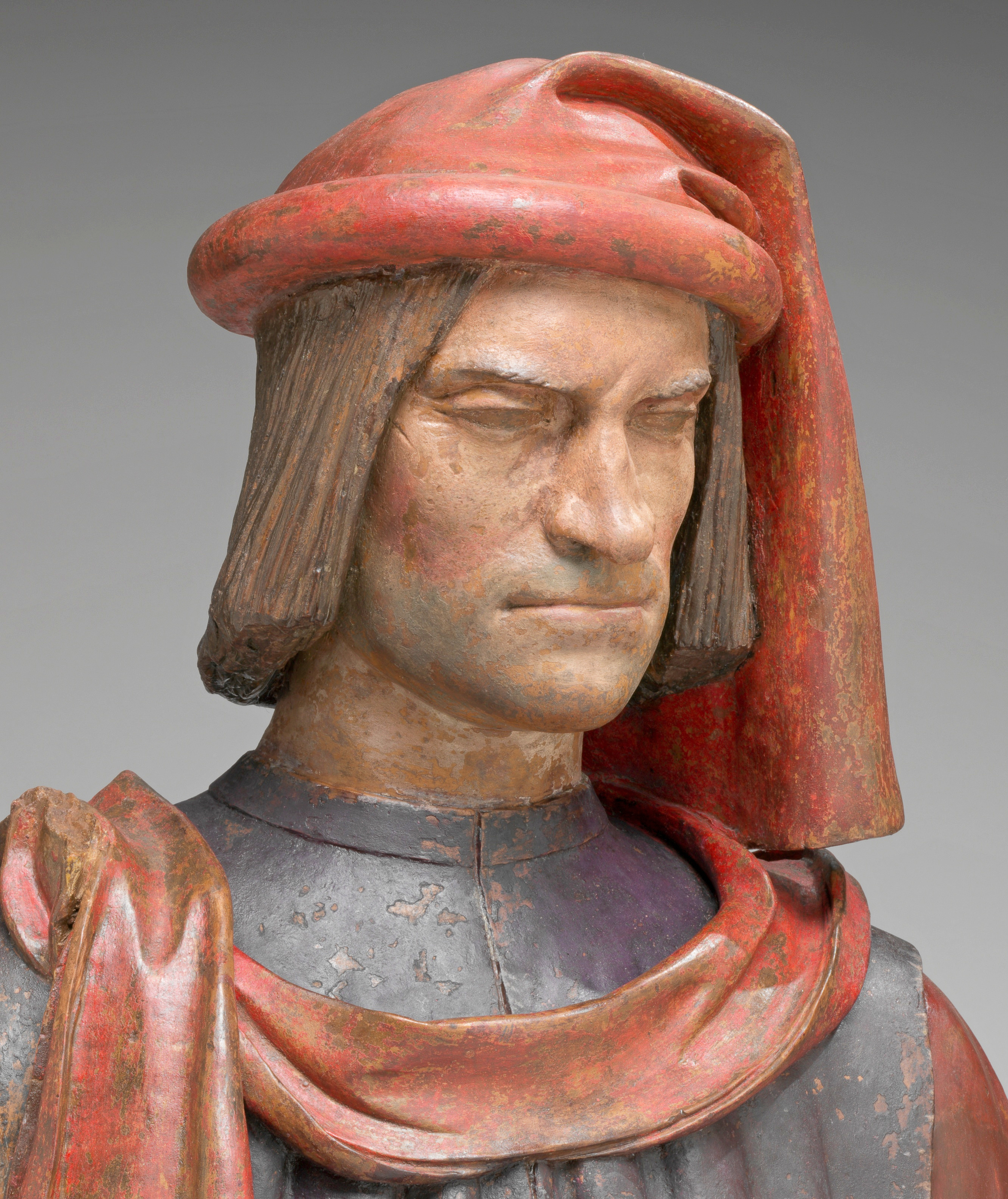
Bust by Verrocchio, 15th-century terracotta bust, National Gallery of Art, Washington

Lorenzo, groomed for power, assumed a leading role in the state upon the death of his father in 1469, when he was 20. Already drained by his grandfather's building projects and constantly stressed by mismanagement, wars, and political expenses, the assets of the Medici Bank were reduced seriously during the course of Lorenzo's lifetime.

Lorenzo, like his grandfather, father, and son, ruled Florence indirectly through surrogates in the city councils by means of payoffs and strategic marriages until 1490. Rival Florentine families inevitably harboured resentments over the Medicis' dominance, and enemies of the Medici remained a factor in Florentine life long after Lorenzo's passing. The most notable of the rival families was the Pazzi, who nearly brought Lorenzo's reign to an end.

On Sunday, 26 April 1478, in an incident known as the Pazzi conspiracy, a group headed by Girolamo Riario, Francesco de' Pazzi, and Francesco Salviati (the archbishop of Pisa), attacked Lorenzo and his brother and co-ruler Giuliano in the Cathedral of Santa Maria del Fiore in an attempt to seize control of the Florentine government. Salviati acted with the blessing of his patron Pope Sixtus IV. Giuliano was killed, brutally stabbed to death, but Lorenzo escaped with only a minor wound to the neck, having been defended by the poet Poliziano and the banker Francesco Nori, the latter of whom was killed in the attack. News of the conspiracy spread throughout Florence, and it was brutally put down by the populace through such measures as the lynching of the archbishop of Pisa and members of the Pazzi family who were involved in the conspiracy.

In the aftermath of the Pazzi conspiracy and the punishment of supporters of Pope Sixtus IV, the Medici and Florence earned the wrath of the Holy See, which seized all the Medici assets that Sixtus could find, excommunicated Lorenzo and the entire government of Florence, and ultimately put the entire Florentine city-state under interdict. When these moves had little effect, Sixtus formed a military alliance with King Ferdinand I of Naples, whose son, Alfonso, Duke of Calabria, led an invasion of the Florentine Republic, still ruled by Lorenzo.

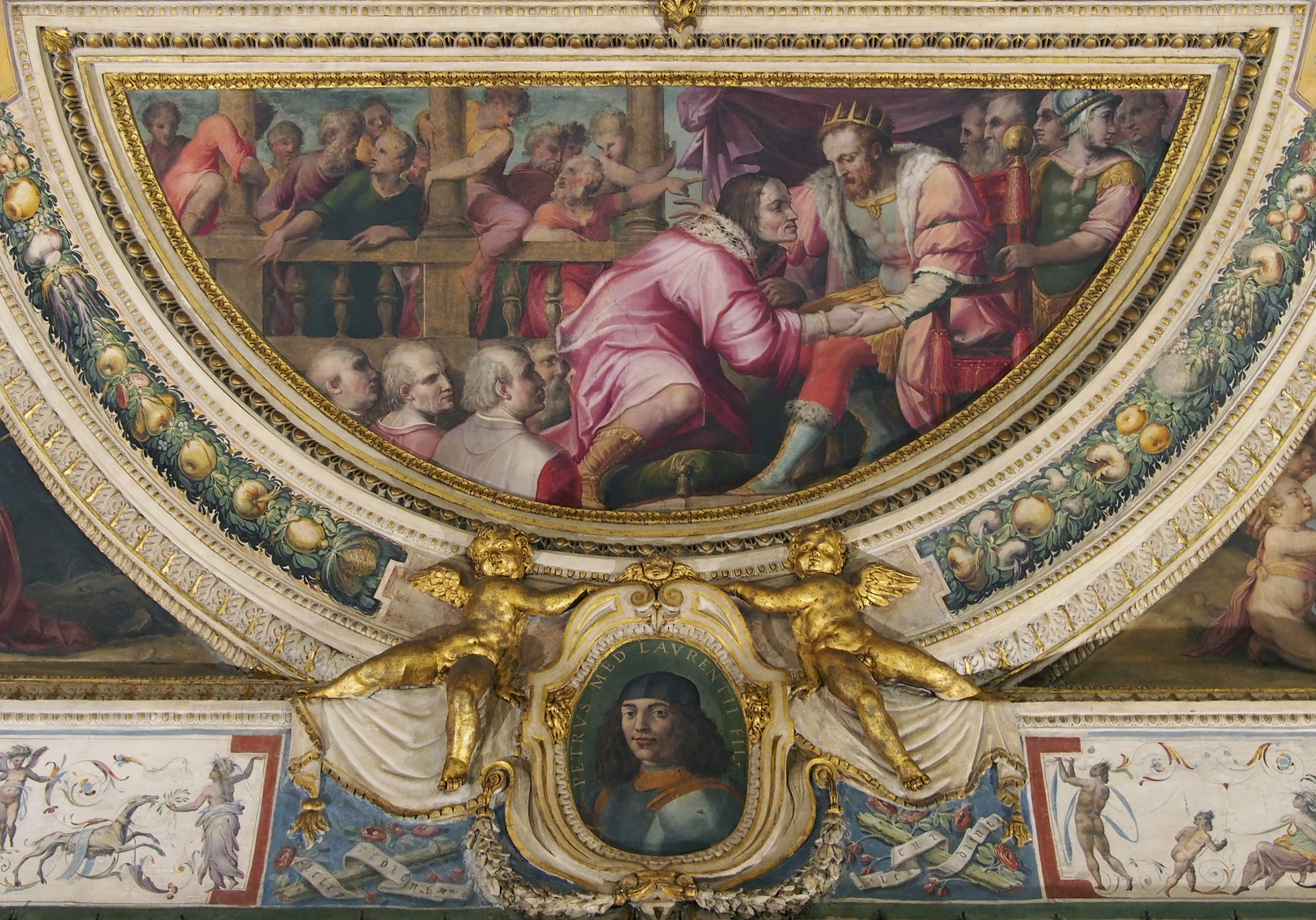
Lorenzo goes to Naples to Ferdinand of Aragon, painting by Giorgio Vasari and Marco da Faenza, Palazzo Vecchio, Sala di Lorenzo the Magnificent, Florence.

Lorenzo rallied the citizens. However, with little support from the traditional Medici allies in Bologna and Milan, the war dragged on, and only diplomacy by Lorenzo, who personally traveled to Naples and became a prisoner of the king for several months, ultimately resolved the crisis. That success enabled Lorenzo to secure constitutional changes within the government of the Florentine Republic that further enhanced his own power.

Thereafter, Lorenzo, like his grandfather Cosimo de' Medici, pursued a policy of maintaining peace, balancing power between the northern Italian states and keeping major European states such as France and the Holy Roman Empire out of Italy. Lorenzo maintained good relations with Sultan Mehmed II of the Ottoman Empire, as the Florentine maritime trade with the Ottomans was a major source of wealth for the Medici.

Efforts to acquire revenue from the mining of alum in Tuscany unfortunately marred Lorenzo's reputation. Alum had been discovered by local citizens of Volterra, who turned to Florence to get backing to exploit this important natural resource. A key commodity in the glassmaking, tanning and textile industries, alum was available from only a few sources under the control of the Ottomans and monopolized by Genoa before the discovery of alum sources in Italy at Tolfa. First the Roman Curia in 1462, and then Lorenzo and the Medici Bank less than a year later, got involved in backing the mining operation, with the pope taking a two-ducat commission for each cantar quintal of alum retrieved and ensuring a monopoly against the Turkish-derived goods by prohibiting trade in alum with infidels. When they realized the value of the alum mine, the people of Volterra wanted its revenues for their municipal funds rather than having it enter the pockets of their Florentine backers. Thus began an insurrection and secession from Florence, which involved putting to death several opposing citizens. Lorenzo sent mercenaries to suppress the revolt by force, and the mercenaries ultimately sacked the city. Lorenzo hurried to Volterra to make amends, but the incident would remain a dark stain on his record.

== Patronage ==
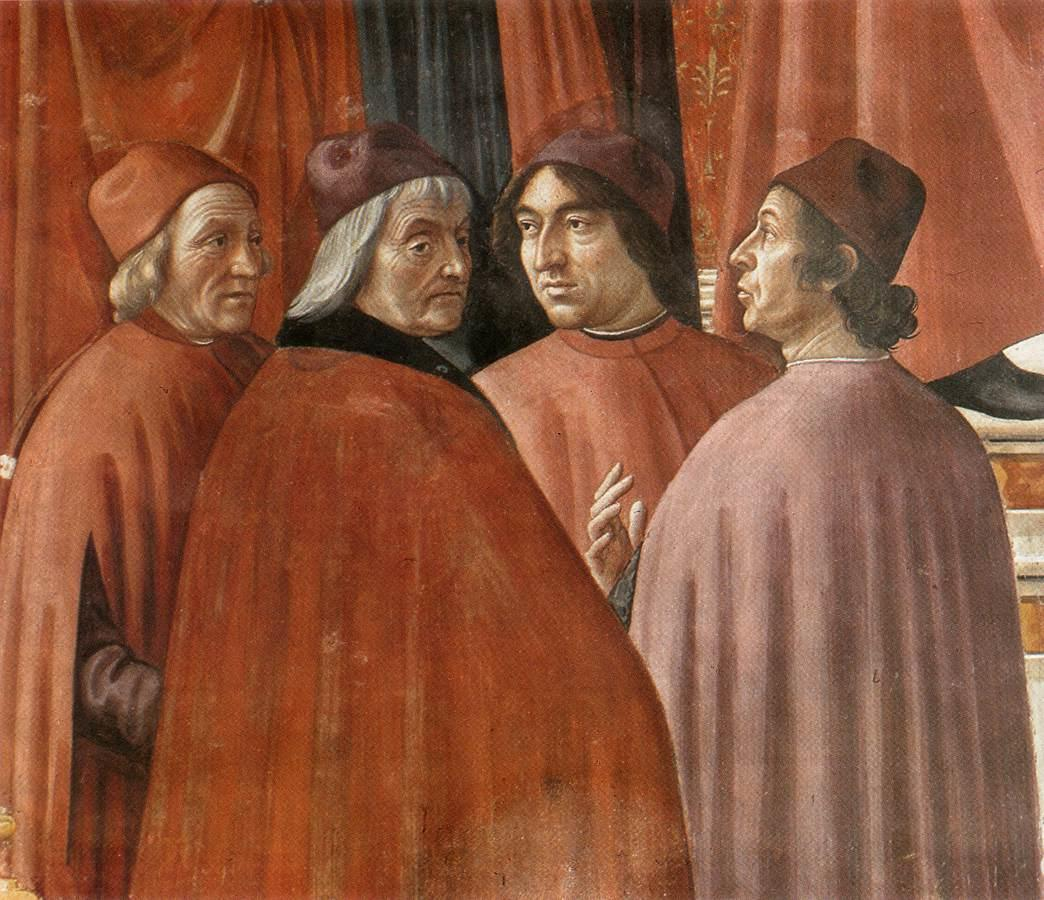
The Angel appearing to Zacharias in the Tornabuoni Chapel in Florence contains portraits of members of the Medici Academy: Marsilio Ficino, Cristoforo Landino, Agnolo Poliziano and either Demetrios Chalkokondyles or Gentile de' Becchi.

Lorenzo's court included artists such as Piero and Antonio del Pollaiuolo, Andrea del Verrocchio, Leonardo da Vinci, Sandro Botticelli, Domenico Ghirlandaio and Michelangelo Buonarroti, who were instrumental in achieving the 15th-century Renaissance. Although Lorenzo did not commission many works himself, he helped these artists to secure commissions from other patrons. Michelangelo lived with Lorenzo and his family for three years, dining at the family table and participating in discussions led by Marsilio Ficino.

Lorenzo was an artist and wrote poetry in his native Tuscan. In his poetry, he celebrates life while acknowledging with melancholy the fragility and instability of the human condition, particularly in his later works. Love, feasts and light dominate his verse.

Cosimo had started the collection of books that became the Medici Library (also called the Laurentian Library), and Lorenzo expanded it. Lorenzo's agents retrieved from the East large numbers of classical works, and he employed a large workshop to copy his books and disseminate their content across Europe. He supported the development of humanism through his circle of scholarly friends, including the philosophers Marsilio Ficino, Poliziano and Giovanni Pico della Mirandola. They studied Greek philosophers and attempted to merge the ideas of Plato with Christianity.

Apart from a personal interest, Lorenzo also used the Florentine milieu of fine arts for his diplomatic efforts. An example includes the commission of Ghirlandaio, Botticelli, Pietro Perugino and Cosimo Rosselli from Rome to paint murals in the Sistine Chapel, a move that has been interpreted as sealing the alliance between Lorenzo and Pope Sixtus IV.

In 1471, Lorenzo calculated that his family had spent some 663,000 florins (about US$460 million today) on charity, buildings and taxes since 1434. He wrote,

I do not regret this for though many would consider it better to have a part of that sum in their purse, I consider it to have been a great honour to our state, and I think the money was well-expended and I am well-pleased.

From 1479 Lorenzo became a permanent member of the committee supervising the rebuild of the signoria in Florence. He created a court of artists in his sculpture garden at San Marco which allowed him to exert 'enormous influence on the selection of artists on public projects'.

== Marriage and issue ==
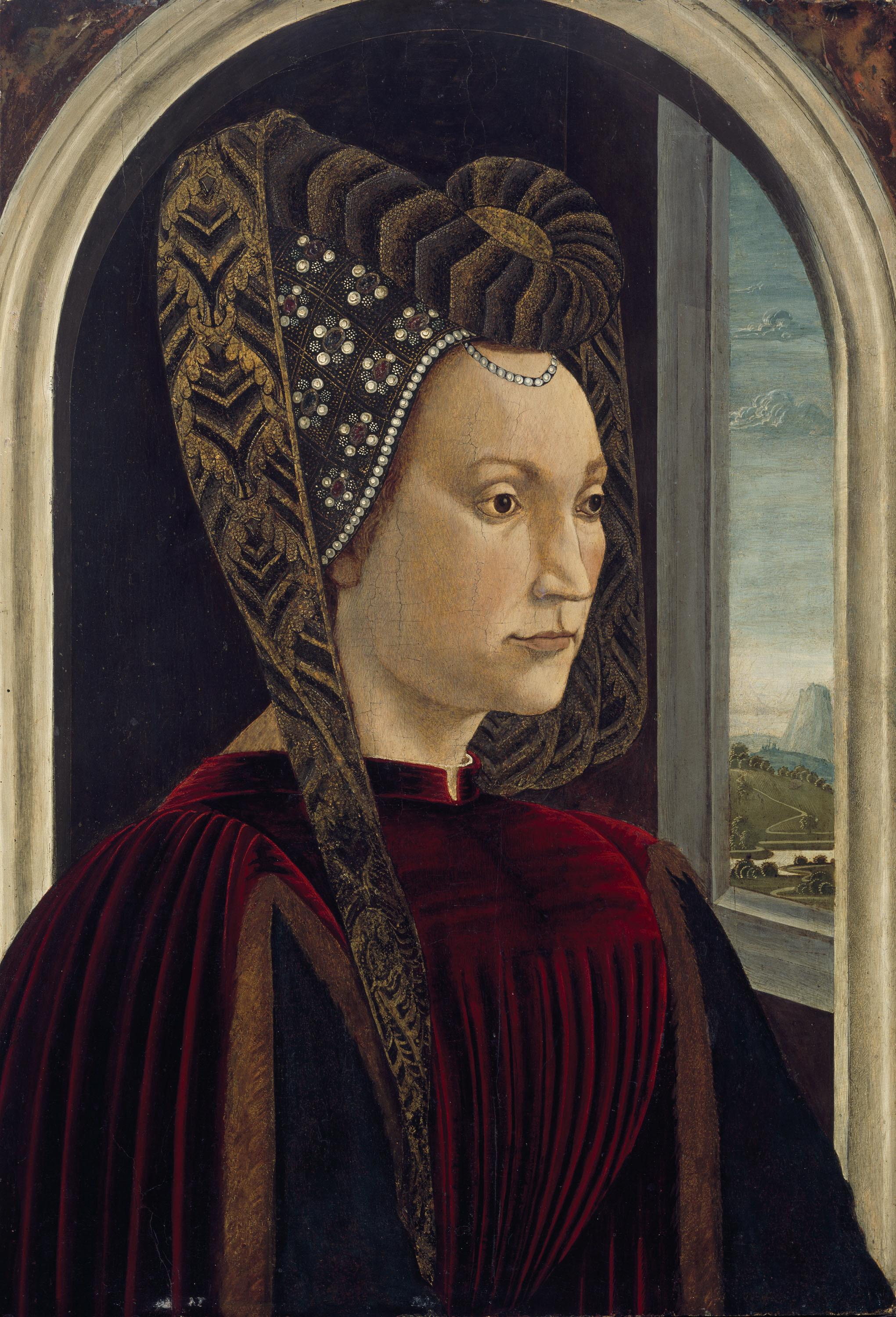
Clarice Orsini

Lorenzo married Clarice Orsini on 7 February 1469. The marriage in person took place in Florence on 4 June 1469. She was a daughter of Giacomo Orsini, Lord of Monterotondo and Bracciano by his wife and cousin Maddalena Orsini.

Lorenzo and Clarice had:

- Lucrezia di Lorenzo de' Medici (1470–1553), who married Jacopo Salviati on 10 September 1486 and had 10 children of her own, including Cardinal Giovanni Salviati, Cardinal Bernardo Salviati, Maria Salviati (mother of Cosimo I de' Medici, Grand Duke of Tuscany), and Francesca Salviati (mother of Pope Leo XI)
- Male twins (March 1471). Their names are unknown, but they lived enough to be baptised.
- Piero di Lorenzo de' Medici (1472–1503), called "the Unfortunate", was ruler of Florence after his father's death; grandfather of Catherine de' Medici, queen of France
- Maddalena di Lorenzo de' Medici (1473–1528) married Franceschetto Cybo (legitimated son of Pope Innocent VIII) on 25 February 1487 and had seven children. Among their children was Caterina Cybo, who later served as regent of the Duchy of Camerino from 1527 to 1535.
- Contessina Beatrice di Lorenzo de' Medici, died shortly after her birth on 23 September 1474
- Giovanni di Lorenzo de' Medici (1475–1521), ascended to the papacy as Leo X in 1513
- Luisa di Lorenzo de' Medici (1477–1488), also called Luigia, was betrothed to Giovanni de' Medici il Popolano, but died young
- Contessina di Lorenzo de' Medici (1478–1515), born in Pistoia, married Piero Ridolfi (1467–1525) in 1494 and had five children, including Cardinal Niccolò Ridolfi
- Giuliano di Lorenzo de' Medici (1479–1516) was created Duke of Nemours in 1515 by Francis I of France

Lorenzo adopted his nephew Giulio di Giuliano de' Medici (1478–1534), the illegitimate son of his slain brother Giuliano. In 1523, after serving four years as ruler of Florence, Giulio ascended to the papacy as Pope Clement VII.

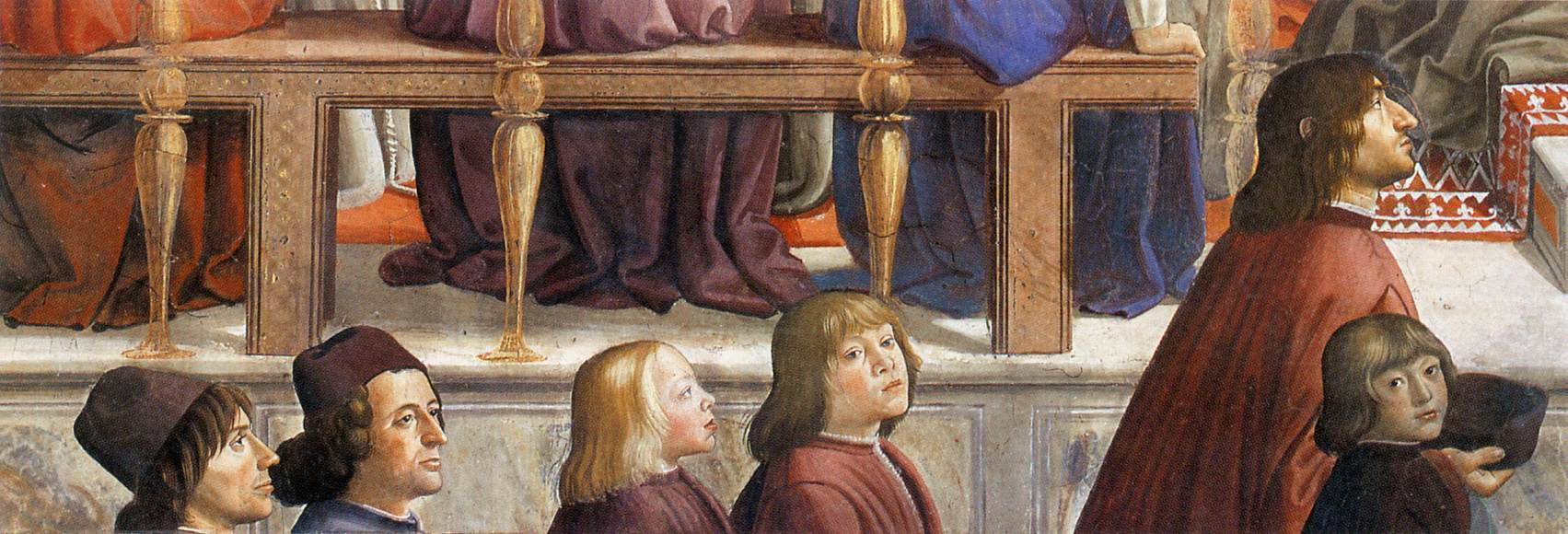
Detail of Domenico Ghirlandaio's Confirmation of the Franciscan Rule from the Sassetti Chapel frescos. Mounting the stairs in the forefront are the tutor of Lorenzo's sons, Angelo Poliziano, and Lorenzo's sons Giuliano, Piero and Giovanni, followed by two members of the Humanist Academy.

== Later years, death, and legacy ==
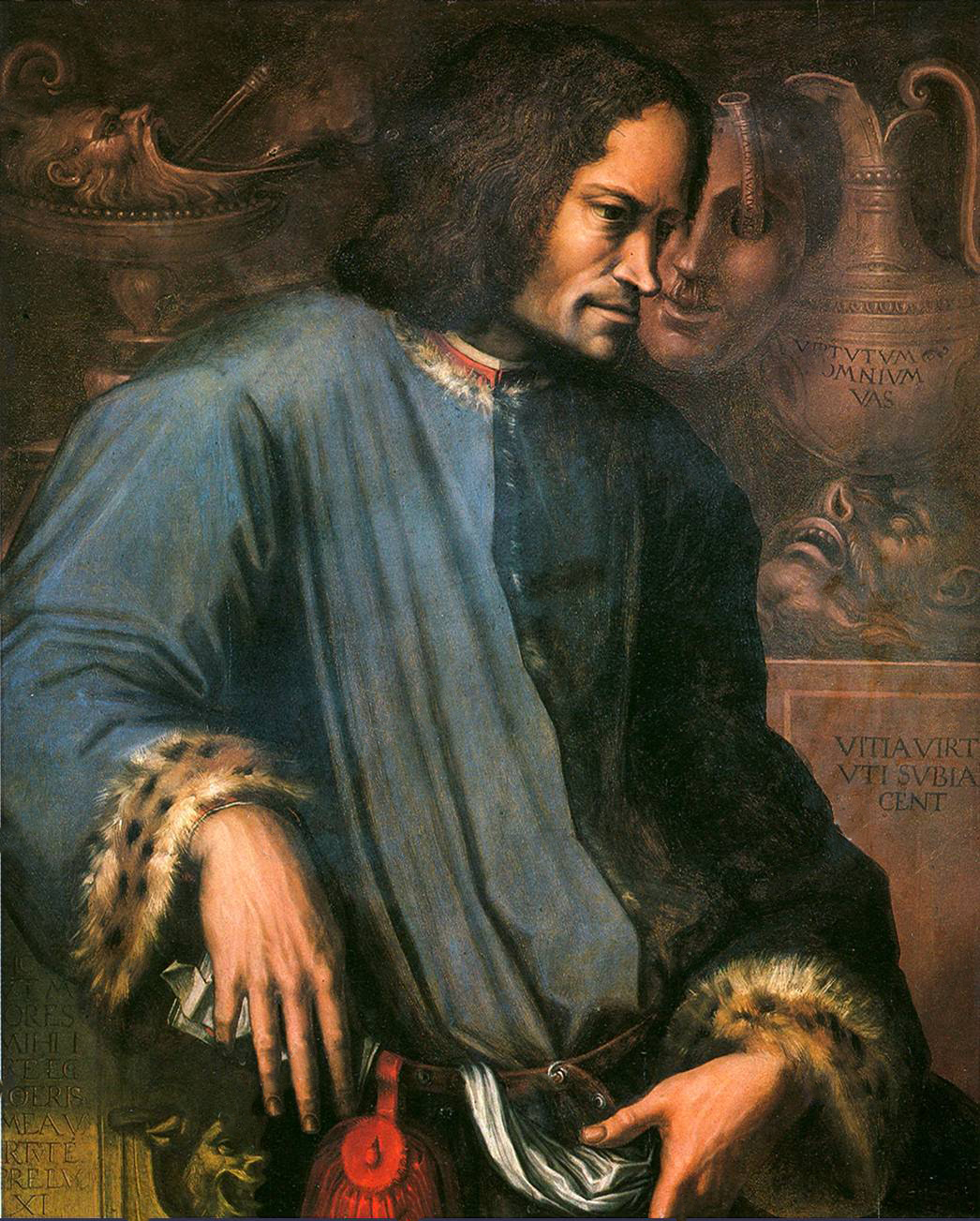
A posthumous portrait of Lorenzo by Giorgio Vasari (16th century)

During Lorenzo's tenure, several branches of the family bank collapsed because of bad loans, and in later years he got into financial difficulties and resorted to misappropriating trust and state funds.

Toward the end of Lorenzo's life, Florence came under the influence of Girolamo Savonarola, who believed Christians had strayed too far into Greco-Roman culture. Lorenzo played a role in bringing Savonarola to Florence.

Lorenzo died during the late night of 8 April 1492, at the longtime family villa of Careggi. Savonarola visited Lorenzo on his deathbed. The rumour that Savonarola damned Lorenzo on his deathbed has been refuted in Roberto Ridolfi's book Vita di Girolamo Savonarola. Letters written by witnesses to Lorenzo's death report that he died peacefully after listening to the Gospel of the day. Many signs and portents were claimed to have taken place at the moment of his death, including the dome of Florence Cathedral being struck by lightning, ghosts appearing, and the lions kept at Via Leone fighting one another.

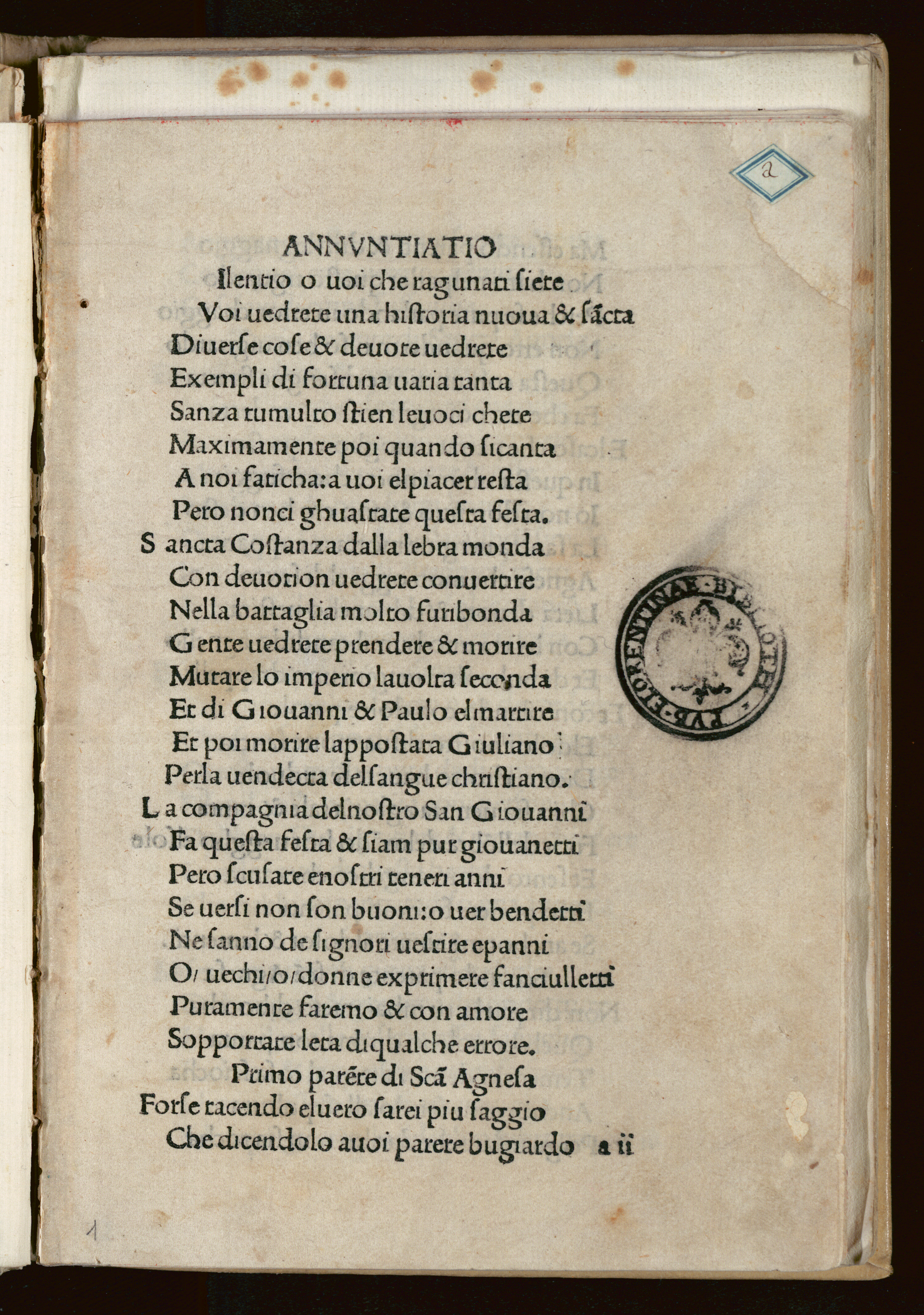
Sacra rappresentazione dei santi Giovanni e Paolo ("Holy representation of the Saints John and Paul"), a work by Lorenzo in the later years

The Signoria and councils of Florence issued a decree:

Whereas the foremost man of all this city, the lately deceased Lorenzo de' Medici, did, during his whole life, neglect no opportunity of protecting, increasing, adorning and raising this city, but was always ready with counsel, authority and painstaking, in thought and deed; shrank from neither trouble nor danger for the good of the state and its freedom. ... it has seemed good to the Senate and people of Florence ... to establish a public testimonial of gratitude to the memory of such a man, in order that virtue might not be unhonoured among Florentines, and that, in days to come, other citizens may be incited to serve the commonwealth with might and wisdom.

Lorenzo was buried with his brother Giuliano in the Basilica di San Lorenzo in the red porphyry sarcophagus designed for Piero and Giovanni de' Medici, not, as might be expected, in the New Sacristy, designed by Michelangelo. The latter holds the two monumental tombs of Lorenzo and Giuliano's less known namesakes: Lorenzo, Duke of Urbino, and Giuliano, Duke of Nemours. According to Williamson and others, the statues of the lesser Lorenzo and Giuliano were carved by Michelangelo to incorporate the essence of the famous men. In 1559, the bodies of Lorenzo de' Medici ("the Magnificent") and his brother Giuliano were interred in the New Sacristy in an unmarked tomb beneath Michelangelo's statue of the Madonna.

Medical researchers have suggested that Lorenzo may have suffered from acromegaly, a rare disorder that results from excessive secretion of growth hormone, based on interpretation of his reported symptoms, and later analysis of his skeleton and death mask.

Lorenzo's heir was his eldest son, Piero di Lorenzo de' Medici, known as "Piero the Unfortunate". In 1494, he squandered his father's patrimony and brought down the Medici dynasty in Florence. His second son, Giovanni, who became Pope Leo X, retook the city in 1512 with the aid of a Spanish army. In 1531, Lorenzo's nephew Giulio di Giuliano – whom Lorenzo had raised as his own son and who in 1523 became Pope Clement VII – formalized Medici rule of Florence by installing Alessandro de' Medici the city's first hereditary duke.

== In popular culture ==
- Lorenzo de' Medici is depicted as a teenager in CBBC's Leonardo, played by actor Colin Ryan.
- Lorenzo de' Medici appears as a supporting character to the protagonist, Ezio Auditore da Firenze, after they help foil the Pazzi conspirators in Assassin's Creed II, played by Alex Ivanovici.
- Lorenzo de' Medici is portrayed by Elliot Cowan in the 2013 TV series Da Vinci's Demons.
- Lorenzo de' Medici is portrayed by Daniel Sharman in the TV series Medici: The Magnificent.
- Lorenzo de' Medici is referred to in the 2002 episode of The Simpsons, "Weekend at Burnsie's". Mr. Burns is ordering pizza for himself and Homer. When Homer says he wants extra cheese, Mr. Burns responds by saying, "What do you take me for? Lorenzo de' Medici?"
- A board game designed by Flaminia Brasini, Virginio Gigli, and Simone Luciani and published in 2016 is called Lorenzo il Magnifico.
