= Contessina di Lorenzo de' Medici =

Italian noblewoman (1478–1515)

Contessina de' Medici
- Countess Palatine
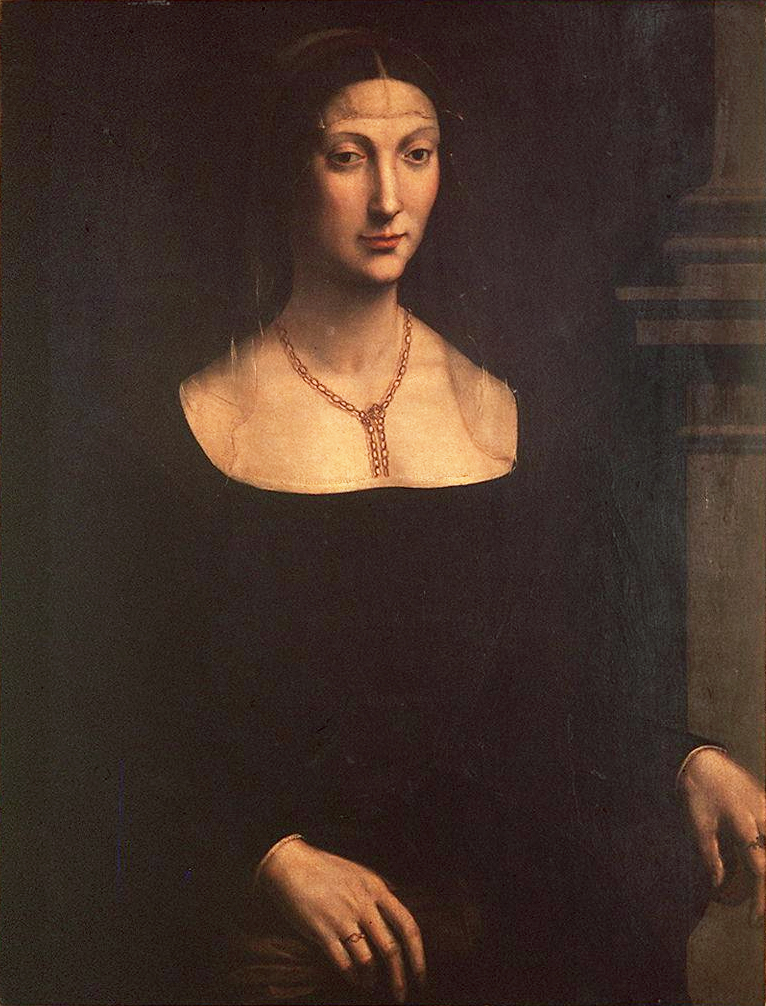
- Portrait of Contessina de' Medici, by unidentified painter, called "Ambito Fiorentino"
- Full name: Contessina Antonia Romola di Lorenzo de' Medici
- Born: 16 January 1478; Pistoia, Republic of Florence
- Died: 29 June 1515 (aged 37); Rome, Papal state
- Noble family: Medici (by birth); Ridolfi (by marriage)
- Spouse: Pietro Ridolfi (m. 1494)
- Issue: Luigi Rodolfi; Emilia Ridolfi; Clarice Ridolfi; Niccolò Ridolfi; Lorenzo Ridolfi; Cosimo Ridolfi
- Father: Lorenzo the Magnificent, Lord of Florence
- Mother: Clarice Orsini

Contessina Antonia Romola di Lorenzo de' Medici (16 January 1478 – 29 June 1515) was an Italian noblewoman, ninthborn and fifth and last daughter of Lorenzo the Magnificent, Lord of Florence, and his wife Clarice Orsini. She was the wife of the Florentine Piero Ridolfi, later made Count Palatine by her elder brother Pope Leo X. She was also cousin of Pope Clement VII.

== Biography ==
Contessina de' Medici was born on 16 January 1478 in Pistoia and was baptized in Florence shortly after her birth. Her first name, Contessina, was given to her in honor of her paternal great-grandmother, Contessina de' Bardi, wife of Cosimo de' Medici.

In May 1494 she married the Piero Ridolfi (1467–1525): a careful marriage to a man from a local Florentine family, planned by her father Lorenzo to counter local anxieties about the ambitions of the Medici, since Florentines were alarmed by the marriages of her siblings Piero and Maddalena to powerful families from other cities. Lorenzo's own marriage to Contessina's mother Clarice Orsini, the first major Medici marriage to a non-Florentine noble house, had been one of the causes of the tension which led to the Pazzi Conspiracy.

In 1513 her brother Giovanni was elected Pope with the name of Leo X. Contessina then moved to Rome with her sisters Lucrezia and Maddalena, where she established herself as an influential woman in papal politics. In 1514, Pope Leo designated all secretaries of the papal curia Counts of the Lateran Court with rights and titles equivalent to an Imperial Count Palatine, including his brother-in-law, Contessina's husband.

Contessina died on 29 June 1515 and was buried in the Church of Sant'Agostino in Rome.

There is no mention of Michelangelo's possible infatuation with her before 1845, so it is probably a legend born in the Romantic era.

== Issue ==
By her husband, Contessina had six children, four sons and two daughters:

- Luigi Ridolfi (28 August 1495 – 1556), politician and ambassador;
- Emilia Ridolfi (1497 – 1514), married Prince Iacopo V Appiano, Lord of Piombino, but died before consummating the marriage;
- Clarice Ridolfi (1499 – 1524) in turn married Iacopo V Appiano, without issue;
- Niccolò Ridolfi (16 August 1501 – 1550), cardinal;
- Lorenzo Ridolfi (6 September 1503 – 1576), knight and apostolic secretary.
- Cosimo Ridolfi (11 August 1508 – 1528).

== Sources ==
- https://web.archive.org/web/20070927014822/http://documents.medici.org/people_details.cfm?personid=4973
- Tomas, Natalie R. (2003). The Medici Women: Gender and Power in Renaissance Florence. Aldershot: Ashgate. ISBN 0754607771.
