= Portrait of Giuliano de' Medici, Duke of Nemours =

Marble sculpture by Michelangelo

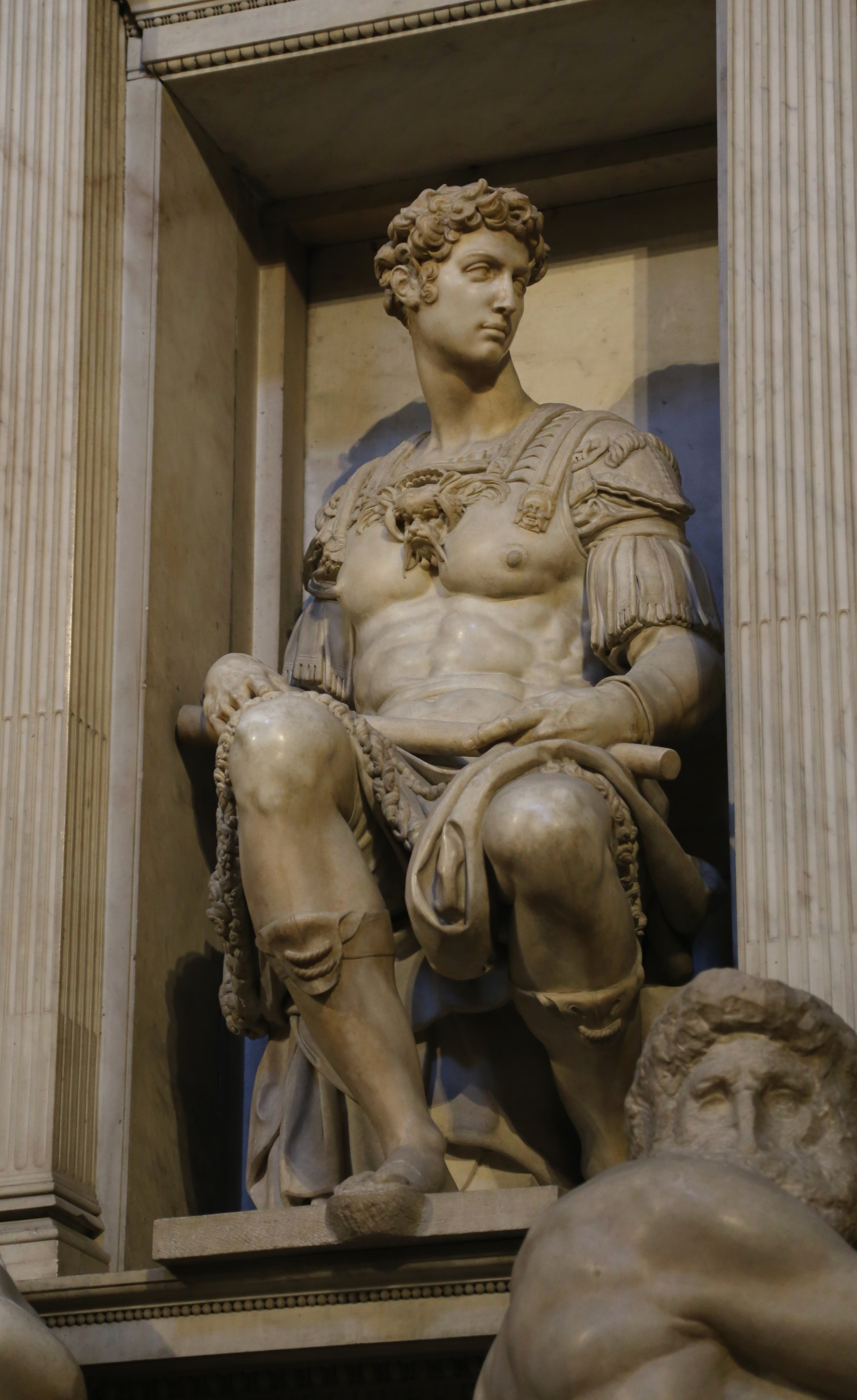
- Artist: Michelangelo
- Year: 1526–1534
- Medium: Marble
- Dimensions: 168 cm (66 in)
- Location: Medici Chapel, San Lorenzo, Florence

The Portrait of Giuliano de' Medici, Duke of Nemours, is a 1.68m–tall marble sculpture by Michelangelo, dating to 1526–1534. It forms part of the decorative scheme of the Medici Chapel in San Lorenzo in Florence. It is the central sculpture of the tomb of Giuliano de' Medici, Duke of Nemours, and is an idealised portrait of him.

== History ==
Michelangelo began work on the statue of Giuliano began about 1526, after his statue of Lorenzo de' Medici, Duke of Urbino, was complete. The sculpture had to be completed in 1534, the year Michelangelo departed from Florence. In 1533 it was entrusted to Giovanni Angelo Montorsoli to complete any finishing touches.

There are four drawings by Tintoretto which contain some details that differ from the finished statue. These drawings are thought to indicate Michelangelo's original conception. In them the figure is naked, which was a common preliminary practice, before the costume is added to the sketch. In the drawings the torso turned more to the left and the right foot rested on an object which is not repeated in the sculpture. Considering the excessive musculature and the pose of the legs, some scholars think that the drawings may instead be imprecise mid–sixteenth-century copies.

== Description and style ==
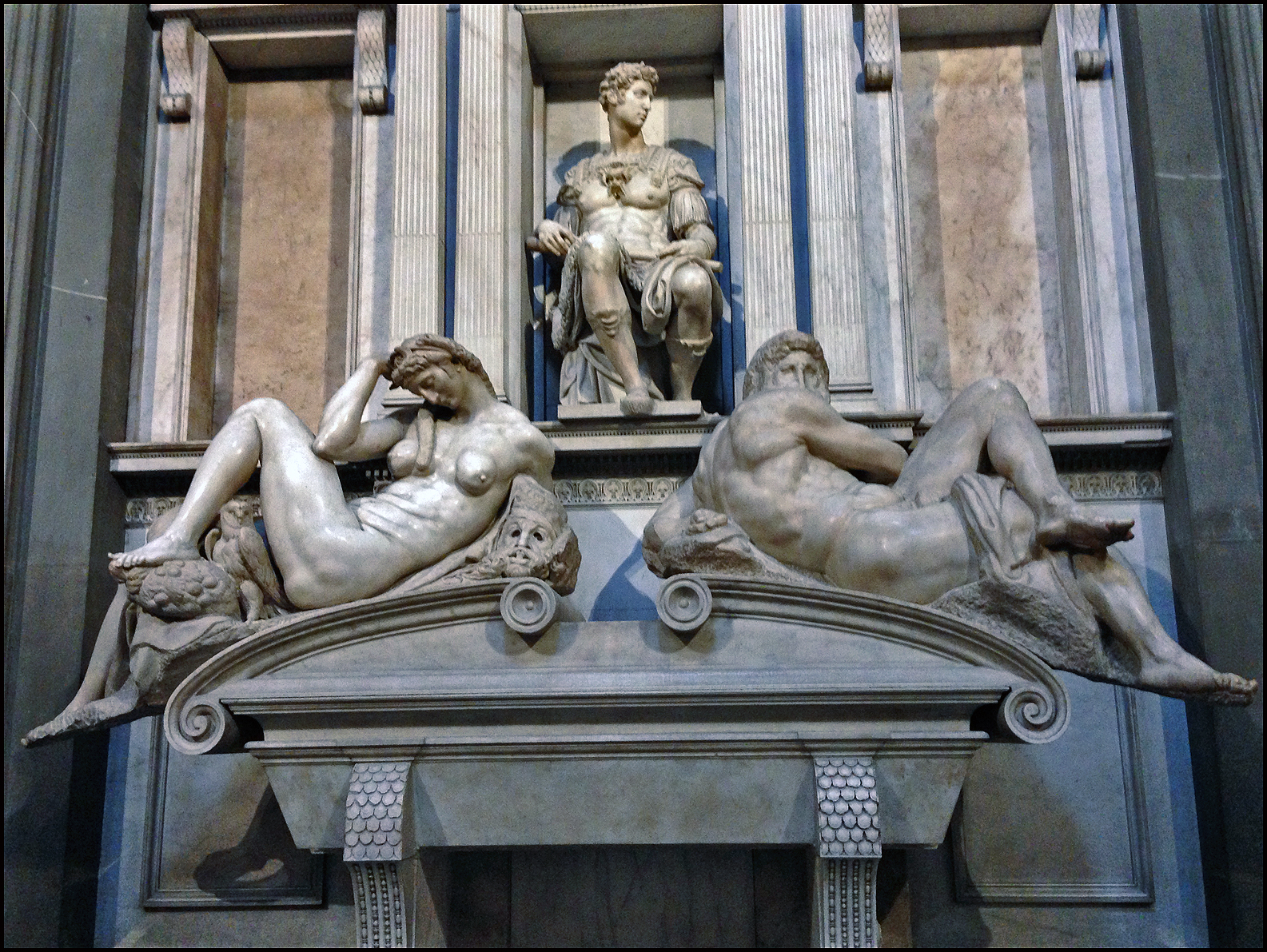
The statue in context on the Tomb of Giuliano de' Medici, Duke of Nemours, with the allegories of Night and Day

The work, inserted in a niche, shows the young duke seated, dressed like an ancient Roman general and in an attitude of pride, as noted by Giorgio Vasari, as opposed to the "melancholic" Lorenzo. This attitude has been read as a metaphor for the "active life" of the Neoplatonic doctrine, as the personification of vigilance, or of the calm of the dead souls, or of the choleric-sanguine temperament of the humoral theory. Political readings have noted the idea of the strong-willed and violent despot.

Giuliano's posture recalls that of Michelangelo's Moses and also the Prophet Joel on the vault of the Sistine Chapel. The armor adheres to the body like a sheath, revealing the muscular torso, just as the high shoes disappear along the shin to reveal the bare feet. The reliefs of the armor have been attributed to Montorsoli, as well as, according to Charles de Tolnay, the detail of the foot protruding from the base. The sculpture idealizes the features of the character. The duke holds the baton of command in his hand, and two coins: these have been interpreted as a reminder of the offering that the dead had to pay in the kingdom of the Underworld according to ancient mythology.

== See also ==
- List of works by Michelangelo
- Michelangelo and the Medici
- Florentine Renaissance art § Michelangelo at San Lorenzo
