= Clarice Orsini =

Wife of Lorenzo de' Medici

- Lady of Florence
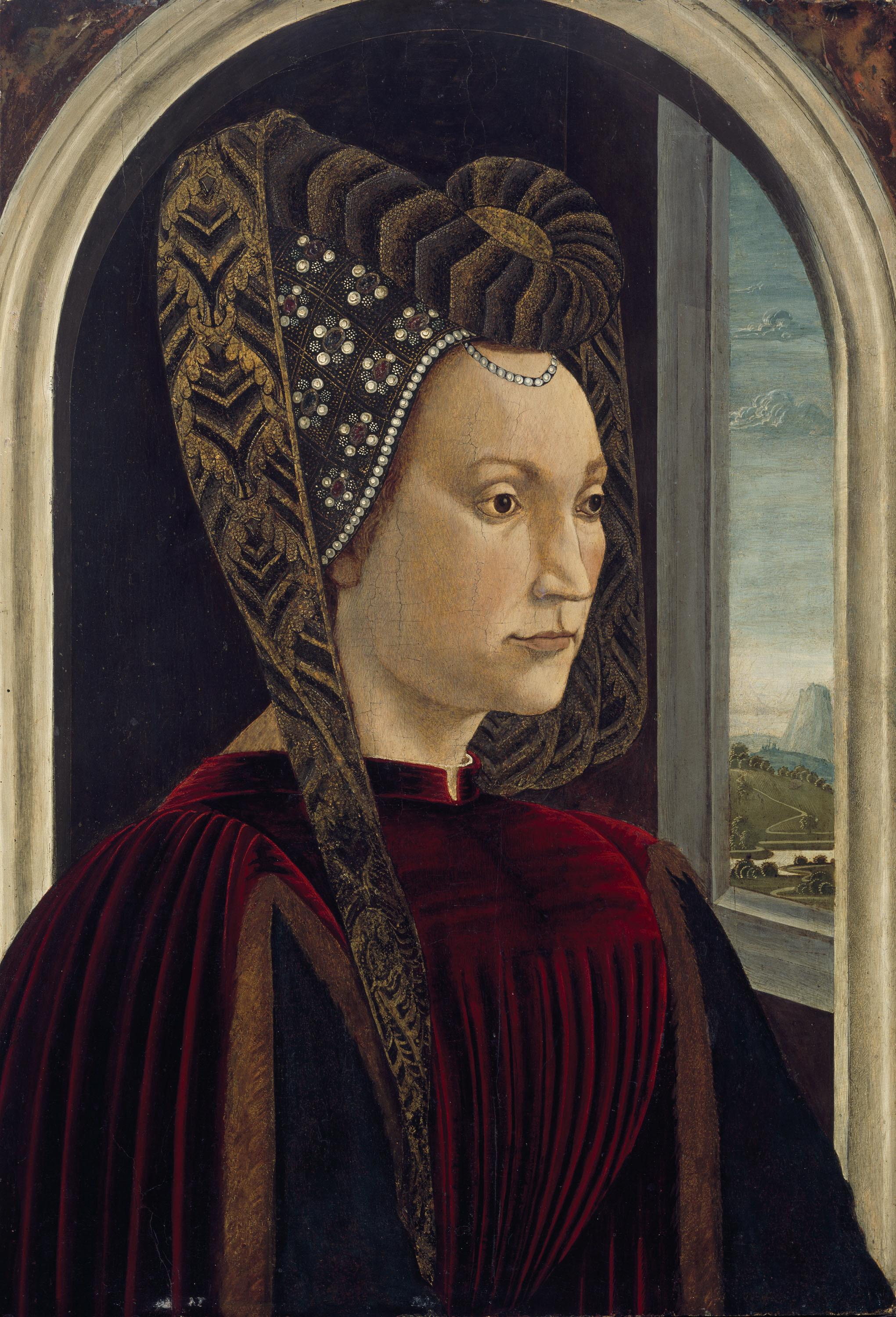
- Born: 1453; Monterotondo, Papal States
- Died: 30 July 1488 (aged 34–35); Florence, Republic of Florence
- Cause of death: Tuberculosis
- Buried: 1 Aug 1488
- Noble family: Orsini (by birth); Medici (by marriage)
- Spouse: Lorenzo de' Medici
- Issue: Lucrezia de' Medici; Male twins Piero de' Medici; Maddalena de' Medici; Contessina Beatrice de' Medici; Giovanni de' Medici, Pope Leo X Luisa de' Medici; Contessina de' Medici; Giuliano de' Medici, Duke of Nemours
- Father: Jacopo Orsini, Lord of Monterotondo and Bracciano
- Mother: Maddalena Orsini

Clarice Orsini (1453 – 30 July 1488) was the daughter of Jacopo Orsini, and Maddalena Orsini; both from the Orsini family, a great Roman noble house, and was the wife of Lorenzo de' Medici.

== Life ==
Clarice and Lorenzo married 4 June 1469, with a four-day celebration. The marriage was arranged by Lorenzo's mother Lucrezia Tornabuoni, who wanted her eldest son to marry a woman from a noble family to enhance the social status of the Medicis. Clarice's dowry was 6,000 florins. Their marriage was unusual for aristocrats in Florence at the time in that they were nearly the same age. However, the marriage connected the wealthy Florentine Medici banking family with the powerful Roman Orsini aristocracy. Lorenzo and Clarice represented the way marriage could unite wealth, aristocratic status and political influence during the Renaissance. Their union also helped strengthen the Medici dynasty for future generations.

The political nature of her marriage meant that she was often called upon by each side of her family to influence the other. This included Lorenzo helping her brother Rinaldo get selected as Archbishop of Florence. In addition, she was often called by the public to support their requests to her husband. These included easing taxes and releasing members from exile or prison. She also utilized her network to gather information about political and military events away from where she was, such as troop movements and battles.

Clarice's religious upbringing was different from the humanist ideals popular in Florence at the time. Despite this difference, sources and letters indicate that there was affection between her and her husband. Of the ten children born to them, four died in infancy. In the household, she was known for her modest character and played a vital role in raising her children and maintaining important networks.

During the Pazzi conspiracy, which was aimed at murdering Lorenzo and his younger brother Giuliano, Clarice and her children were sent to Pistoia. (The Pazzis succeeded in murdering Giuliano, but Lorenzo survived the attack, thus the conspirators' plan to replace the Medicis as de facto rulers of Florence failed).

Clarice returned to Rome several times to visit her relatives; she also visited Volterra, Colle Val d'Elsa, Passignano sul Trasimeno, and other places in the 1480s. During these visits, she was treated as a representative of her husband, an unusual role for a woman in that time and place.

On 30 July 1488 she died of tuberculosis in Florence, and was buried two days later. Her husband was not present during the duration of the sickness and funeral; this was because he was also ill and busy seeking treatment in Bad Filetta near Siena.

The fact that Lorenzo was away from home when she died, affected even more his mood. Piero da Bibbiena, private chancellor of the Magnificent, wrote the following letter to the Florentine Ambassador in Rome :

Yesterday morning at 2 pm Clarice died. If you hear Lorenzo blamed for not being present at the death of his wife, excuse him. It seemed necessary...that he brought water from the Villa; and no one thought that she would die so soon.

In a letter to Pope Innocent VIII he wrote that he dearly missed his late wife. The content of Lorenzo's letter to the Pope is the following:

The death of my dearest and sweetest wife Clarice, that recently happened to me, it is of so much damage, prejudice, and pain for infinite reasons, that it has overcome my patience and resistance to the troubles and persecutions of fate, for which I did not think that I would be so affected. And this, to be deprived of such sweet habits and companionship...made me feel, and currently makes me feel, as if I'm lost.

== Issue ==
Clarice and Lorenzo had ten children:

- Lucrezia de' Medici (Florence, 4 August 1470 – 15 November 1553); married Jacopo Salviati on 10 September 1486 and had 10 children, including Cardinal Giovanni Salviati, Cardinal Bernardo Salviati, Maria Salviati (mother of Cosimo I de' Medici, Grand Duke of Tuscany), and Francesca Salviati (mother of Pope Leo XI).
- Male twins (March 1471). Their name are unknown, but they lived long enough to be baptised.
- Piero de' Medici (Florence, 15 February 1472 – Garigliano River, 28 December 1503), ruler of Florence after his father's death, called "the Unfortunate"
- Maddalena de' Medici (Florence, 25 July 1473 – Rome, 2 December 1528), married 25 February 1487 Franceschetto Cybo (illegitimate son of Pope Innocent VIII) and had eight children
- Contessina Beatrice de' Medici (23 September 1474 - September 1474), died young
- Giovanni de' Medici (Florence, 11 December 1475 – Rome, 1 December 1521), ascended to the Papacy as Pope Leo X on 9 March 1513.
- Luisa de' Medici (Florence, 1477 – May 1488), also called Luigia, was betrothed to Giovanni de' Medici il Popolano but died young.
- Contessina de' Medici (Pistoia, 16 January 1478 – Rome, 29 June 1515); married 1494 Piero Ridolfi (1467 - 1525) and had five children, including Cardinal Niccolò Ridolfi.
- Giuliano de' Medici, Duke of Nemours (Florence, 12 March 1479 – Florence, 17 March 1516), created Duke of Nemours in 1515 by King Francis I of France.

Their children were taught by Angelo Poliziano for a time. In 1478, he wanted to teach the children humanism, Latin, and Greek, but Clarice insisted on their lessons being more religious, and delivered in Italian. She had also removed the family and their teacher from Florence after the scare of the Pazzi conspiracy, and he chafed under the exile. In May 1479, she tried to dismiss the tutor over another change in the curriculum, though Lorenzo continued to pay him.

== Ancestry ==
Ancestors of Clarice Orsini

16. Giordano Orsini, Lord of Monterotondo
8. Francesco Orsini, Lord of Monterotondo
17. Anastasia Orsini
4. Orso Orsini, Lord of Monterotondo
18. Nicola Annibaldeschi
9. Costanza Annibaldeschi
2. Jacopo Orsini, Lord of Monterotondo and Bracciano
20. Giovanni Conti
10. Aldobrandino Conti, Signore of Valmontone
5. Lucrezia Conti
11. Caterina di Sangro
1. Clarice Orsini
24. Francesco Orsini
12. Giovanni Orsini, Lord of Bracciano
25. Giacoma Carraciolo
6. Carlo Orsini, Lord of Bracciano
26. Nicola Spinelli
13. Bartolomea Spinelli
27. Simona della Marra
3. Maddalena Orsini
28. Giovanni Orsini
14. Giacomo Orsini, Count of Tagliacozzo
29. Nicoletta Orsini
7. Paola Orsini
15. Isabella Marzano

== In popular culture ==
She appears in the second season of Medici, played by Synnøve Karlsen. She also appears in the Starz series Da Vinci's Demons played by Lara Pulver.

== Sources ==
- Pernis, Maria Grazia; Adams, Laurie (2006). Lucrezia Tornabuoni De' Medici and the Medici Family in the Fifteenth Century. New York: Peter Lang Publishing, Inc. ISBN 978-0820476452.
- Tomas, Natalie R. (2003). The Medici Women: Gender and Power in Renaissance Florence. Aldershot: Ashgate. ISBN 0754607771.
