= Giovanni di Cosimo de' Medici =

Italian banker (1421–1463)

Giovanni de' Medici
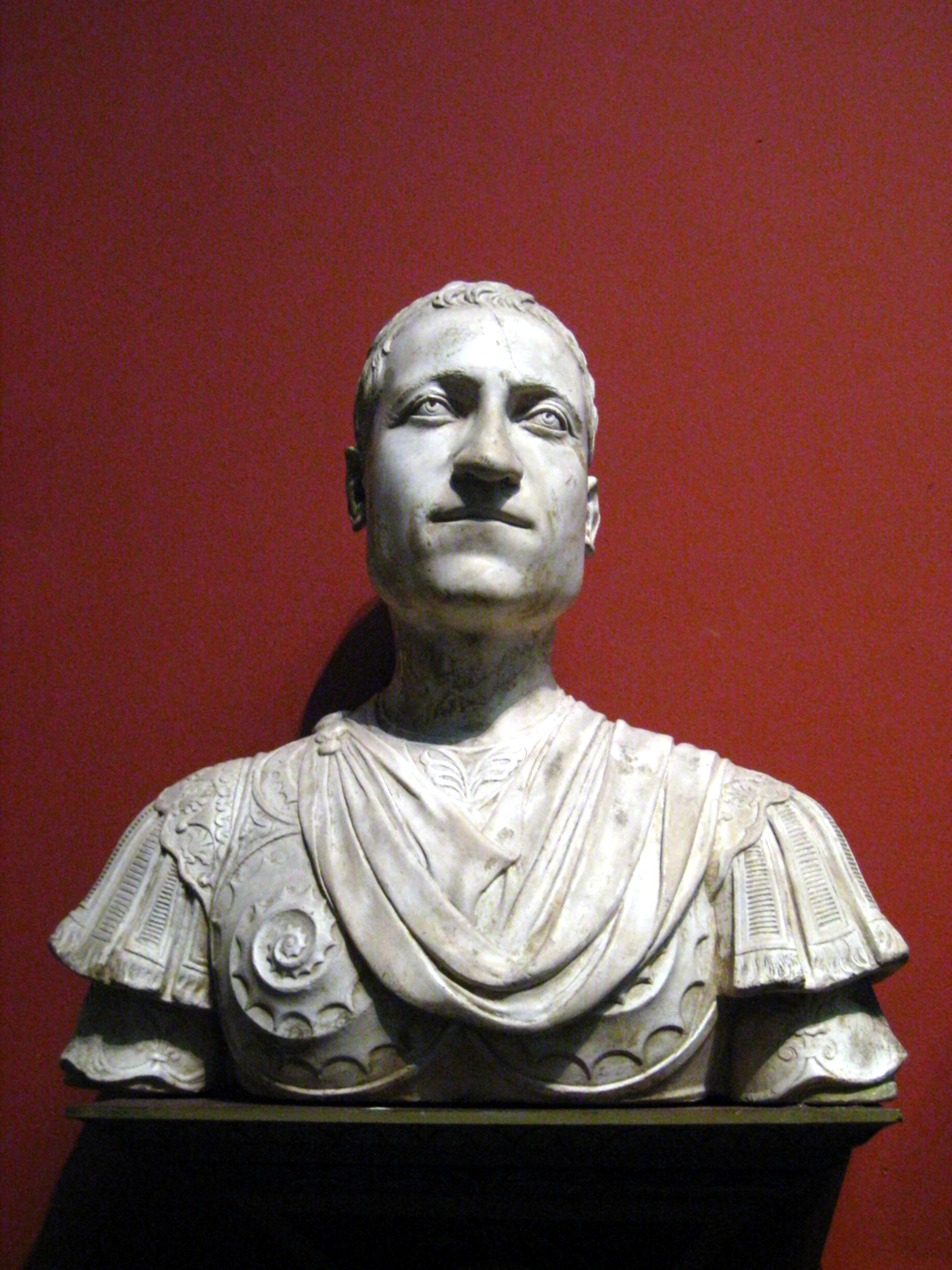
- Giovanni by Mino da Fiesole
- Born: 3 June 1421; Florence, Republic of Florence
- Died: 23 September 1463 (aged 42); Florence, Republic of Florence
- Noble family: Medici
- Spouse: Ginevra degli Alessandri
- Issue: Cosimino de' Medici
- Father: Cosimo de' Medici
- Mother: Contessina de' Bardi

Giovanni di Cosimo de' Medici (3 June 1421 – 23 September 1463) was an Italian banker and patron of arts.

Giovanni was the son of Cosimo de' Medici the Elder and Contessina de' Bardi, and brother to Piero the Gouty. Unlike the latter, Giovanni enjoyed good health and was seen by Cosimo as his probable successor. From 1438 he directed the branch of the family bank in Ferrara. He received also a humanistic education, showing a major interest in music.

In 1454 Giovanni was elected Prior of Florence and the following year he was a member of the delegation which received Pope Pius II in the city. The following year Cosimo made him general director of the Medici bank, but, unsatisfied because of Giovanni's distraction in arts and other activities, assigned to him Francesco Sassetti as tutor.

Giovanni married Maria Ginevra di Niccolò Alessandri, daughter of Niccolò Alessandri, in 1452. This marriage recognized the support that Niccolò had provided to Cosimo during his exile in 1433, and bound the families together. The couple had one child, a son, Cosimo (c. 1454 – c. 1459), known as Cosimino (little Cosimo). Ginevra frequently visited thermal baths for her health. There she built up a network of influential women who she regularly corresponded with. Ginevra died after 2 Aug 1478.

He died in 1463, and was buried in the Sagrestia Vecchia of the Basilica di San Lorenzo. Later a monument was sculpted for him and his brother by Andrea Verrocchio.

Giovanni de' Medici was a famous patron of arts. He had the Villa Medici in Fiesole built by Michelozzo Michelozzi (but probably in collaboration with Giovanni's friend, Leon Battista Alberti). He had a large collection of sculptures, coins, manuscripts, jewels, musical instruments and other material. Artists who worked for him included: Mino da Fiesole, Desiderio da Settignano, Donatello, Domenico Veneziano, Filippo Lippi and Pesellino.

== Sources ==
- Pernis, Maria Grazia; Adams, Laurie (2006). Lucrezia Tornabuoni de' Medici and the Medici family in the fifteenth century. New York: Peter Lang Publishing, Inc. ISBN 0820476455.
- Tomas, Natalie R. (2003). The Medici Women: Gender and Power in Renaissance Florence. Aldershot: Ashgate. ISBN 0754607771.
