= Bernardo Salviati =

Italian cardinal

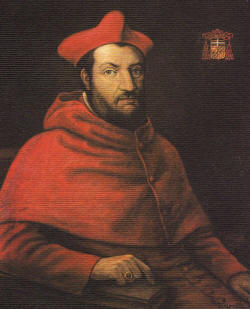
Bernardo Salviati

Bernardo Salviati (17 February 1508 – 6 May 1568) was an Italian condottiero and Roman Catholic Cardinal.

== Biography ==
Salviati was born in Florence, the son of Jacopo Salviati and Lucrezia di Lorenzo de' Medici, the sister of Giovanni de' Medici. The year of his birth is given as 1492 and also 1470. From an early age he was a knight of the Order of St. John of Jerusalem.

In his military career he fought against the Ottomans, obtaining the grade of admiral in the Military Order of Malta, which he represented as ambassador before Charles V, Holy Roman Emperor, at Barcelona. He also fought against the Republic of Siena during the Italian Wars.

He became Grand Almoner to Catherine de' Medici (she was his maternal cousin's daughter), who had convinced him to set aside his fighting career for an ecclesiastical one. He followed his brother as bishop of Saint-Papoul. He was named Cardinal by Pope Pius IV on 26 February 1561.

His brother Giovanni and his nephew Anton Maria were also cardinals. Salviati was also uncle of the future pope Leo XI and of the first Grand Duke of Tuscany, Cosimo I de' Medici.

He died in his residence in Trastevere, Rome, on 6 May 1568 and is entombed at Santa Maria sopra Minerva.
