= Jacopo Orsini, Lord of Monterotondo =

Italian nobleman

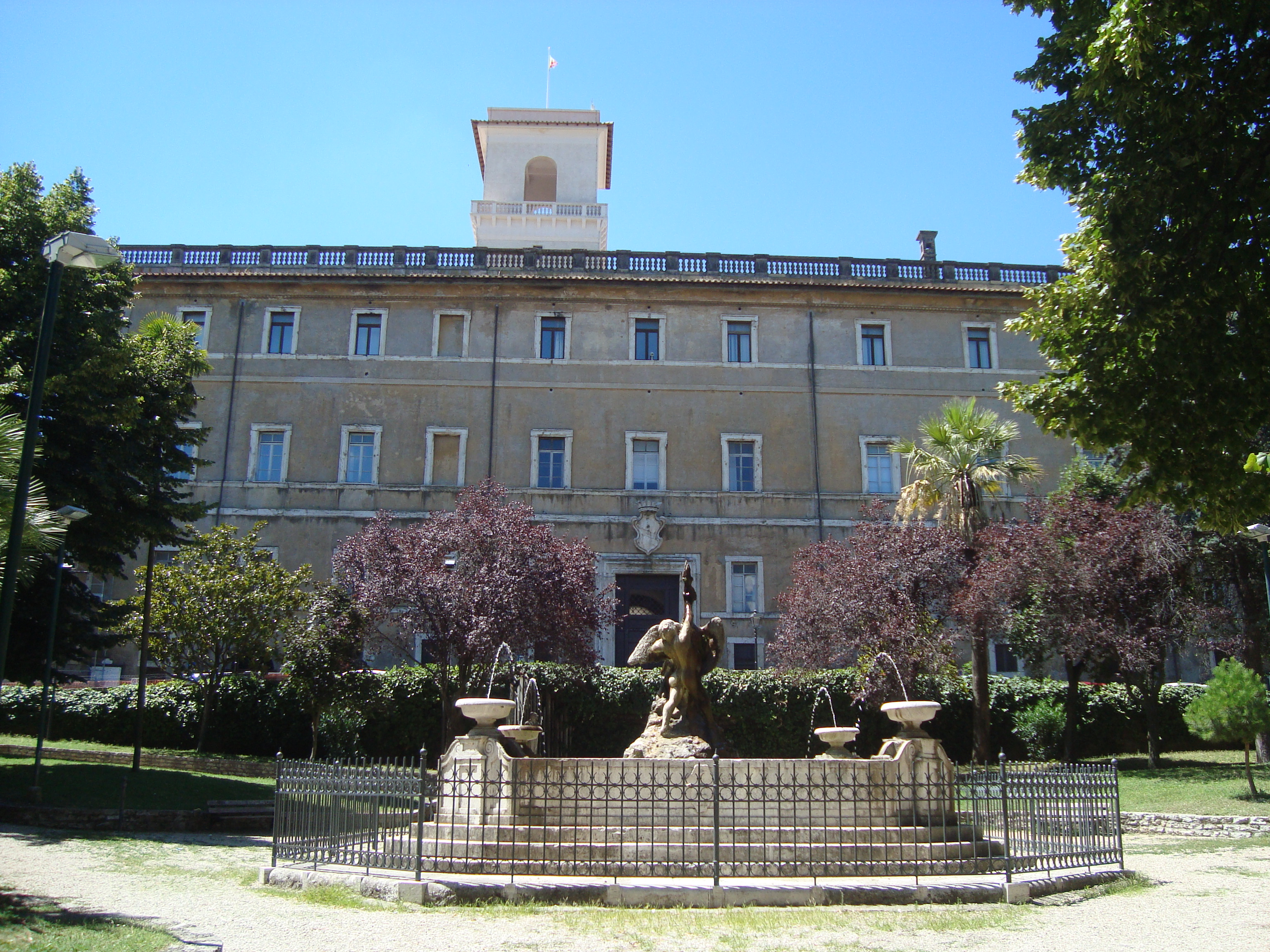
The Orsini Palace in Monterotondo, Italy, seat of the city hall.

Jacopo Orsini (1424–1482) was an Italian nobleman of the Orsini family.

== Life ==
The son of Orso Orsini and Lucrezia Conti, Jacopo succeeded his father as lord of Monterotondo. In 1431, he received the castle of Calvi on behalf of the Papal State. In 1433, on the orders of Pope Eugene IV, he sent a hundred troops to Orte to defend it against Niccolò Fortebraccio. In 1448, he founded a Capuchin convent in Monterotondo. In 1480, he brought Lorenzo de' Medici's congratulations to the recently elected Pope Sixtus IV. In 1482, he served the Republic of Venice as a condottiero (mercenary captain) during the War of Ferrara.

== Family ==
Orsini's first wife was Francesca d'Alviano. His second wife was Maddalena Orsini, with whom he had four children:

- Rinaldo (died 1509), archbishop of Florence
- Aurante (c. 1450 – post 1497), married firstly Gian Ludovico Pio, who was executed in 1469 for having participated in a plot against Duke Borso d'Este; married secondly Lorenzo Malaspina di Gragnola
- Clarice Orsini (1453–1488), married Lorenzo de' Medici
- Orso Organtino (died 1479), his successor

== Bibliography ==
- Litta, Pompeo. Famiglie celebri di Italia: Orsini di Roma. Turin, 1846.
