= Contessina de' Bardi =

Italian noblewoman (1390–1473)

Contessina de' Medici
- Lady of Florence
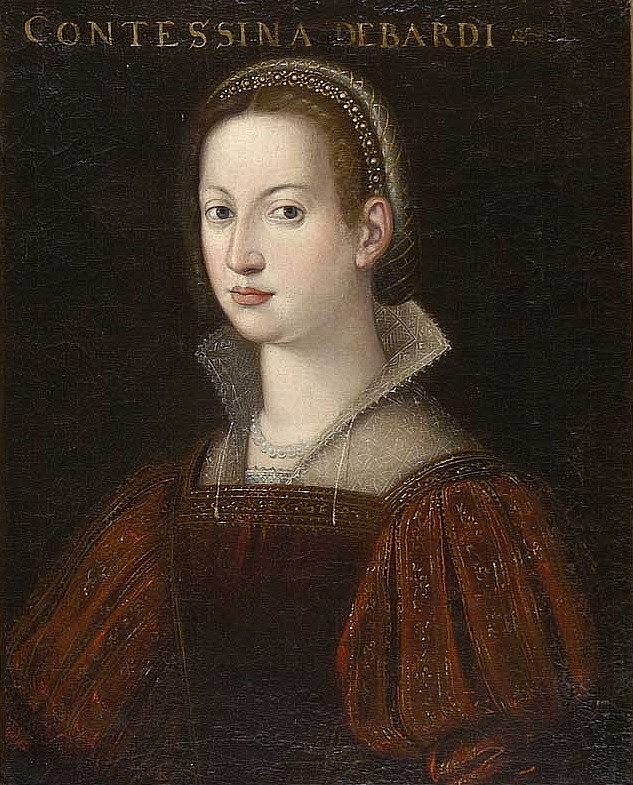
- Cristofano dell'Altissimo, posthumous portrait of Contessina de' Bardi
- Born: c. 1390; Florence
- Died: October 1473; Florence
- Noble family: Bardi (by birth); Medici (by marriage)
- Spouse: Cosimo de' Medici
- Issue: Piero the Gouty; Giovanni de' Medici
- Father: Alessandro di Sozzo de' Bardi, count of Vernio
- Mother: Camilla Pannocchieschi

Contessina de' Bardi (1390–October 1473), was an Italian noblewoman from the House of Bardi. Her marriage into the House of Medici provided her husband's family with much needed nobility, prestige, and military support as they established their power in Florence.

== Bardi family ==
The Bardi family had been exceptionally rich for some time but following the collapse of the family bank in 1343, its importance was considerably reduced. They enjoyed some fame as suzerains and condottieri. The Medici called on them in this guise, on certain occasions, for armed support of the Medici's political hegemony.

Contessina's parents were Alessandro di Sozzo Bardi, count of Vernio, and Camilla Pannocchieschi, daughter of Raniero di Guido Pannochieschi, count of Elci.

== Life ==
Around 1415, Contessina de' Bardi married Cosimo de' Medici and they went to live with his parents, Piccarda Bueri and Giovanni di Bicci de' Medici. Like Giovanni's marriage to Piccarda, this marriage brought noble connections to the common family of the Medici. Contessina was known for being careful with money and the managing of their household.

Together the couple had two sons: Piero the Gouty and Giovanni de' Medici. Additionally, Contessina agreed to take charge of Cosimo's illegitimate son, Carlo de' Medici, by a Circassian slave named Maddalena.

She survived her husband by about ten years. He died in 1464 and she remained a point of reference for their grandchildren. She had a good relationship with her daughter-in-law Lucrezia Tornabuoni, and she lived with her and her son Piero after her husband's death. Her relationship with Piero's sons, Lorenzo di Piero di' Medici and Giuliano di Piero de' Medici, was close from their childhood and allowed her political influence as they became leaders. This influence included negotiating tax benefits for those she supported. She was also regularly involved in negotiating and approving marriages for the more important families in Florence.

Contessina died between 26 September and 25 October, 1473. Her grandson Lorenzo named one of his daughters Contessina de' Medici in honor of her.

== Fictional depictions ==
Contessina is portrayed by Annabel Scholey in the 2016 television series Medici: Masters of Florence.
