= Piero di Cosimo de' Medici =

Lord of Florence from 1464 to 1469

Piero the Gouty
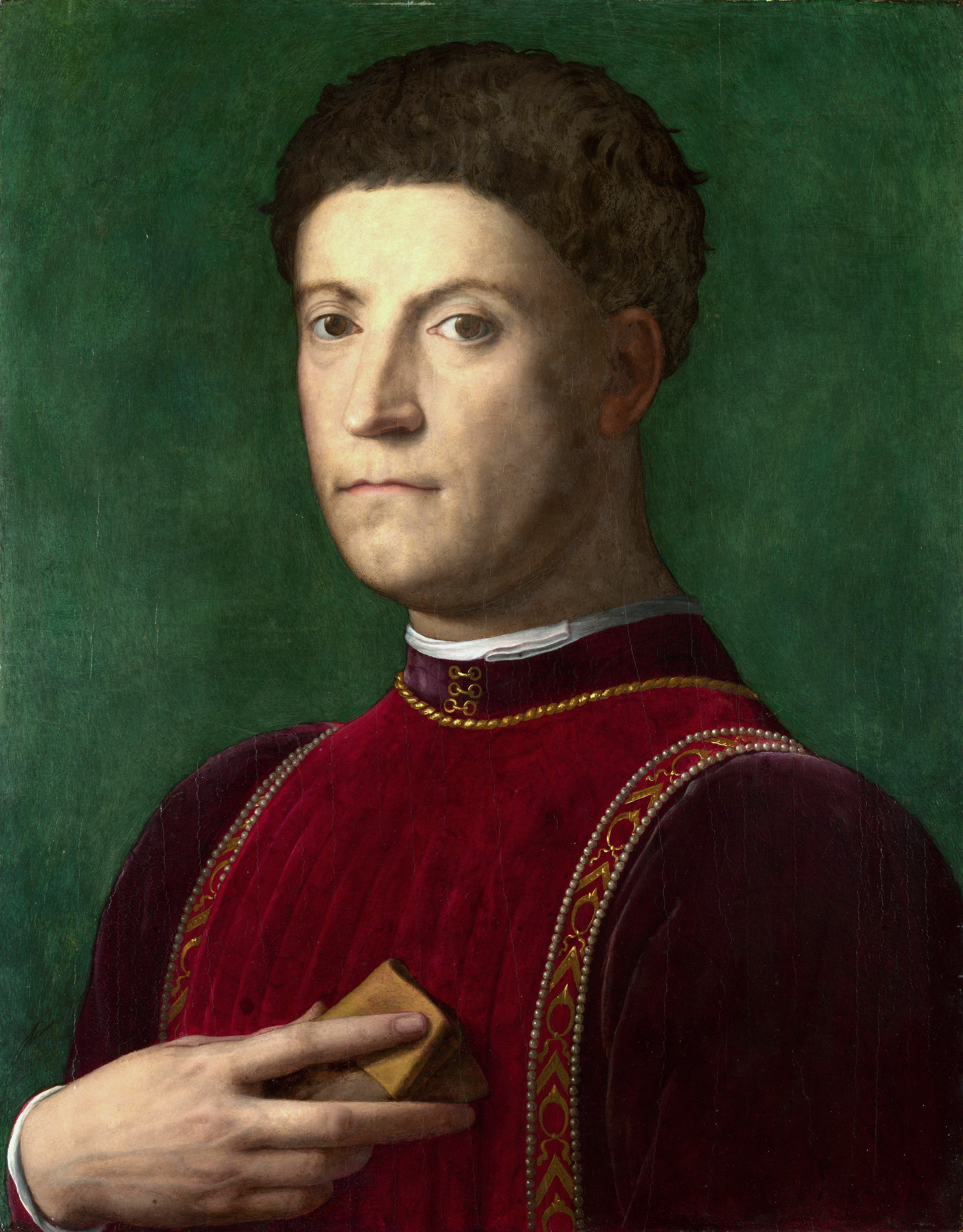
- Portrait of Piero by Bronzino.

Lord of Florence
- Reign: 1 August 1464 – 2 December 1469
- Predecessor: Cosimo the Elder
- Successor: Lorenzo de' Medici
- Born: 19 September 1416; Florence, Republic of Florence
- Died: 2 December 1469 (aged 53); Florence, Republic of Florence
- Noble family: Medici
- Spouse: Lucrezia Tornabuoni
- Issue: Giovanni ill.; Bianca; Lucrezia "Nannina"; Lorenzo the Magnificent; Giuliano; Maria; Two sons
- Father: Cosimo de' Medici
- Mother: Contessina de' Bardi

The augmented coat of arms granted to Piero by Louis XI in 1465, replacing one of the seven "balls" or palle of the family arms by a somewhat larger ball showing the arms of France.

Piero di Cosimo de' Medici (1416 – 2 December 1469), known as Piero the Gouty (Italian: Piero il Gottoso), was the de facto ruler of the Republic of Florence from 1464 to 1469, during the Italian Renaissance.

== Biography ==
Piero was the son of Cosimo de' Medici the Elder and Contessina de' Bardi. During his father's life, he did not play an extensive role due to his perpetual poor health, the source of his nickname. His brother Giovanni was named as Cosimo's executor, but predeceased his father. In 1461, Piero was the last Medici elected to the office of Gonfaloniere. His gout often kept him confined to bed. This meant that his bedroom effectively became his office, where he would conduct political meetings. This led to the Medici palace becoming the seat of government in Florence.

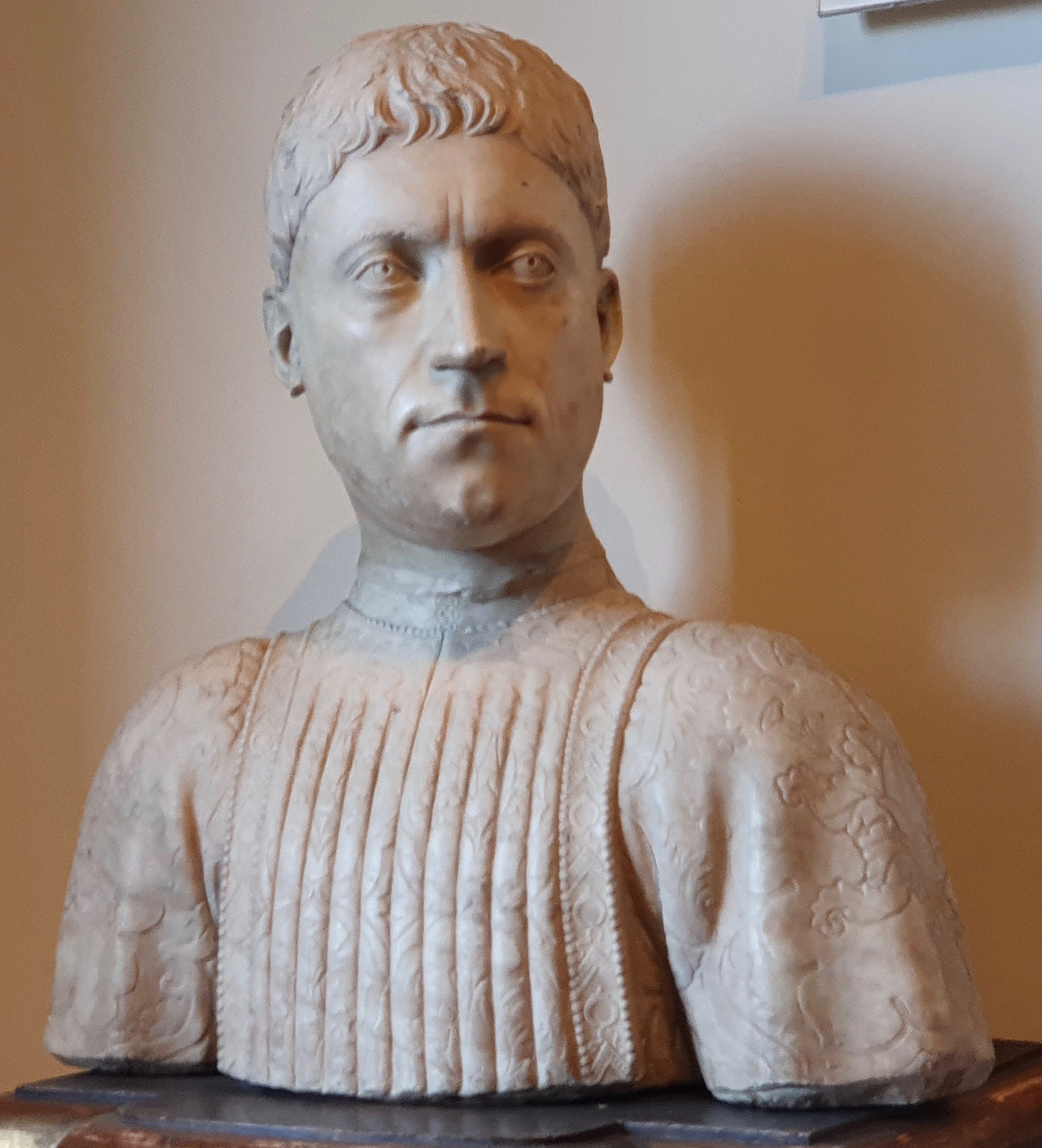
The earliest dated Renaissance portrait bust, 1453, by Mino da Fiesole

Upon taking over the Medici bank from his father, Piero had a financial overview prepared. The results led him to call up a number of long-standing loans, many to various Medici supporters, which his father had let stand. This immediately drove a good number of the merchants involved into bankruptcy and added to the ranks of those who opposed the Medici. Although not as brilliant a banker as his father, he was able to keep things running smoothly during his tenure.

His time as leader of Florence was marked by an attempted coup led by Luca Pitti, Niccolò Soderini, Diotisalvi Neroni, Angelo Acciaiuoli and his cousin Pierfrancesco de' Medici, who used troops provided by Borso d'Este, Duke of Modena and Reggio, and commanded by his brother Ercole d'Este, planned for 26 August 1466. Piero was warned by Giovanni II Bentivoglio and was able to escape the coup, in part because his son Lorenzo discovered a road-block set up by the conspirators to capture Piero in his trip toward the Medici Villa di Careggi; he was not recognized and was able to warn his father. The coup failed, as did an attempted repeat backed by Venice, using troops commanded by Bartolomeo Colleoni. It has been argued that the "coup" was in fact a legitimate attempt to limit the power of the Medici faction and restore a system of government in keeping with Florence's traditional republican ideals, and that to refer to it as a "coup" or a "conspiracy" legitimizes Piero's de facto and hereditary (but wholly unconstitutional) status as leader of the city.

In 1467, Piero had to face a war against the Republic of Venice prompted by the Florentine support given to Galeazzo Maria Sforza, the new duke of Milan. However, the Venetian army under Colleoni was defeated at the Battle of Molinella by a league of Florence, Naples, the Papal States and Milan.

Piero also continued the family's tradition of artistic patronage, including Gozzoli's fresco Procession of the Magi in the Palazzo Medici Riccardi (in which are also present both of Piero's sons, Lorenzo and Giuliano, as well as Piero himself). His taste was more eclectic than that of his father, extending to Dutch and Flemish artworks.

Piero continued to collect rare books, adding many to the Medici collections. With a strong interest in humanism, he commissioned Marsilio Ficino to translate Plato and other classical works. Ficino dedicated several books to him, such as De Sole.

Piero died in 1469 as a result of gout and lung disease. He is buried in the Church of San Lorenzo, next to his brother Giovanni. The tomb, created by Andrea del Verrocchio, was commissioned by his sons Lorenzo and Giuliano.

== Marriage and issue ==
On 3 June 1444, Piero married Lucrezia Tornabuoni (1427–1482). Their children include Lorenzo the Magnificent and Giuliano de' Medici. All his family is probably portrayed in the famous painting by Botticelli known as the Madonna of the Magnificat, in which Lucrezia Tornabuoni appears as the Virgin Mary.

In all, Lucrezia gave birth to at least seven children:

- Bianca (1445–1505) – married Guglielmo Pazzi
- Lucrezia "Nannina" (1448–1493)
- Lorenzo the Magnificent (1449–1492)
- Giuliano (1453–1478)
- Maria (1455–1479) – married Leonetto Rossi and was the mother of Cardinal Luigi de' Rossi.
- Two sons died as newborn

Before his marriage, Piero had an illegitimate son by an unknown woman:

- Giovanni – married Luigia di Giovanni de' Medici

== Fictional depictions ==
A young Piero is portrayed by Alessandro Sperduti in the 2016 television series Medici: Masters of Florence. An older Piero is portrayed by Julian Sands in the first two episodes of the second season, Medici: The Magnificent.

== Sources ==
- Pernis, Maria Grazia; Adams, Laurie (2006). Lucrezia Tornabuoni De' Medici and the Medici Family in the Fifteenth Century. New York: Peter Lang Publishing, Inc. ISBN 978-0820476452.
- Tomas, Natalie R. (2003). The Medici Women: Gender and Power in Renaissance Florence. Aldershot: Ashgate. ISBN 0754607771.
- "Piero di Cosimo de' Medici". Encyclopædia Britannica Online. 2015.
- Najemy, John M. (2006). A History of Florence 1200–1575. Chichester: Blackwell Publishing. ISBN 978-1405119542.
