= Tornabuoni =

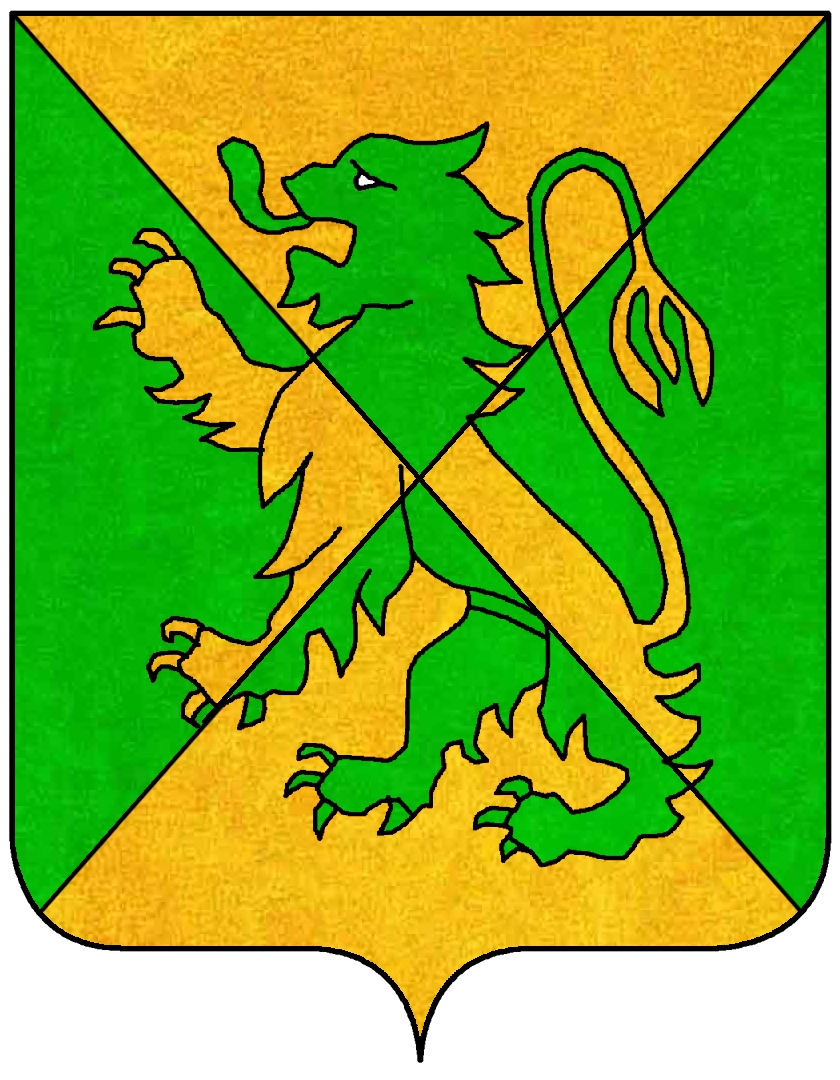
Coat of arms of Tornabuoni family

The House of Tornabuoni is the name of an old and important Italian noble family, which originated from Florence, whose members occupied many notable positions in feudal Italy.

== History ==
The family was formerly called Tornaquinci and had arrived in Florence since the 10th century and in the 12th century it was part of the families that governed the city when it was decided to side against Frederick Barbarossa. In 1178 there were street battles between the anti-imperials (Cavalcanti, Giandonati, Tornaquinci and a few others) and the pro-imperials (Uberti), which saw the defeat of the latter.

The family became rich with trade and exchange (banking), coming to be included among the "magnates", i.e. those "aristocratic" families who enjoyed a certain economic and even military power. They had achieved this above all through commercial success, since no Tornaquinci was declared a knight or had participated in the crusades. They were part of the Guelph faction and suffered several casualties during the battle of Val di Nievole in August 1315. However, with the defeat of the Ghibelline faction they wanted to access public office, but their political ascent was soon barred by anti-magnate laws. In 1393 the main branch of the family, belonging to Simone di Tieri Tornaquinci, then decided to change its name for convenience, becoming popolani (commoners) and choosing the appellation of Tornabuoni.

== Notable members ==
- Lucrezia Tornabuoni (1427–1482), Italian writer and political adviser
- Giovanni Tornabuoni (1428–1497), Italian merchant, banker and patron of the arts
- Lietta Tornabuoni (1931–2011), Italian film critic, journalist and writer

== See also ==
- Tornabuoni Chapel, Santa Maria Novella, Florence, originally featuring the Tornabuoni Altarpiece
- Via de' Tornabuoni, a street in Florence
