= Lietta Tornabuoni =

Italian film critic and journalist

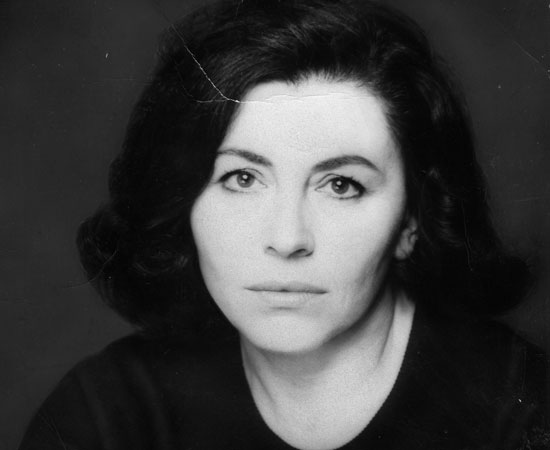
- Tornabuoni c. 1970
- Born: Giulietta Tornabuoni; 24 March 1931; Pisa, Kingdom of Italy
- Died: 11 January 2011 (aged 79); Rome, Italy
- Occupations: Film critic; journalist

Giulietta "Lietta" Tornabuoni (24 March 1931 – 11 January 2011) was an Italian film critic, journalist and author.

== Life and career ==
Born in Pisa, Tuscany, into an aristocratic family, Tornabuoni started her journalistic career in 1949 for the magazine Noi donne. In the late 1960s she worked for a conservative women's magazine, Annabella, and in one of her articles she argued that for men from the lower classes miniskirts were vulgar, but more educated men believed that these should be accepted by Italians. She is best known as the main film critic of the newspaper La Stampa, with which she collaborated from 1970 to the rest of her career. Other collaborations include L'Espresso, Novella, Corriere della Sera and L'Europeo. She was also author of several books, mainly related to cinema. She died in Rome from the consequences of a fall, at the age of 79.
