= Tornabuoni Chapel =

Chapel in the church of Santa Maria Novella, Florence

Coordinates: 43°46′30.46″N 11°14′57.93″E

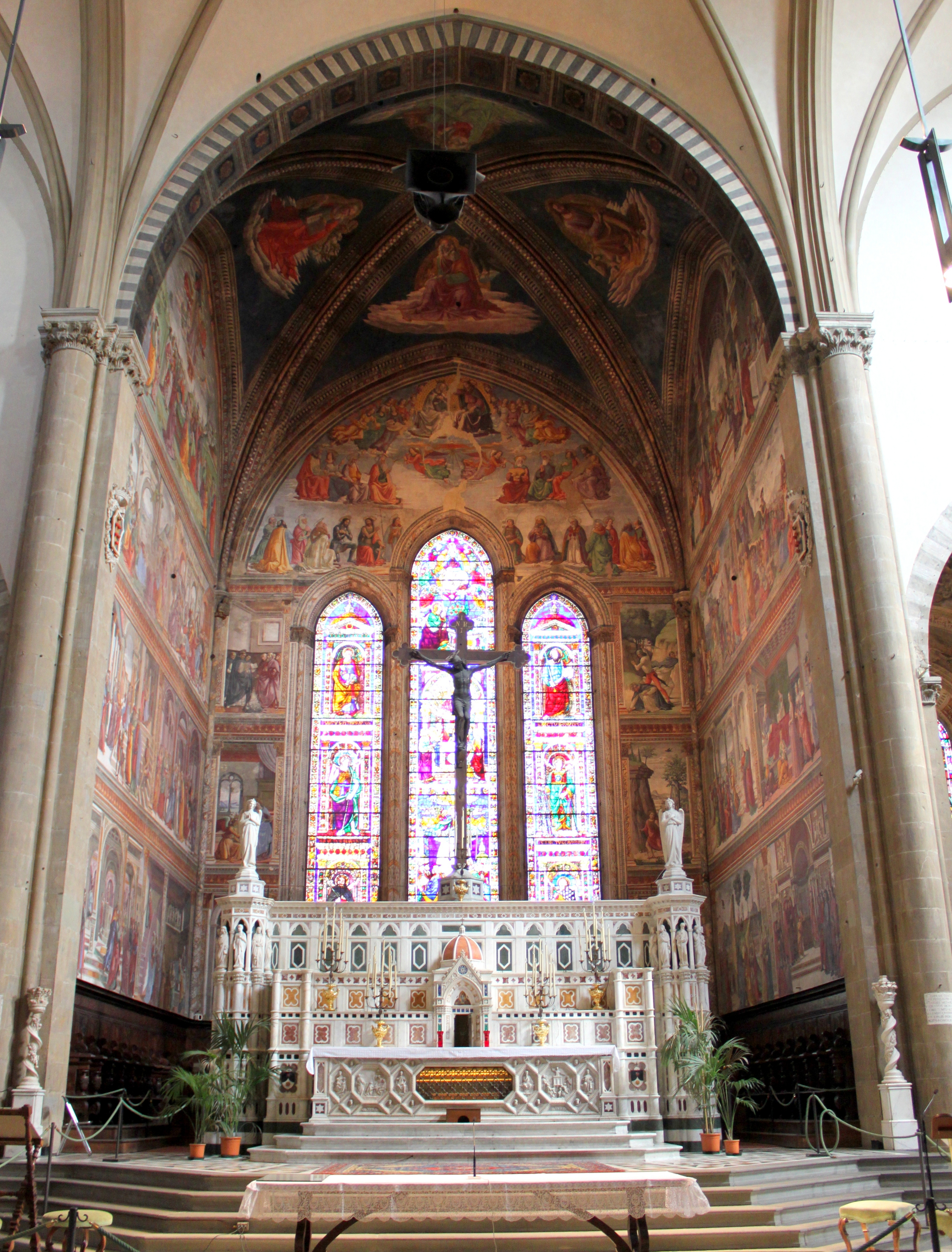
View of the Tornabuoni Chapel

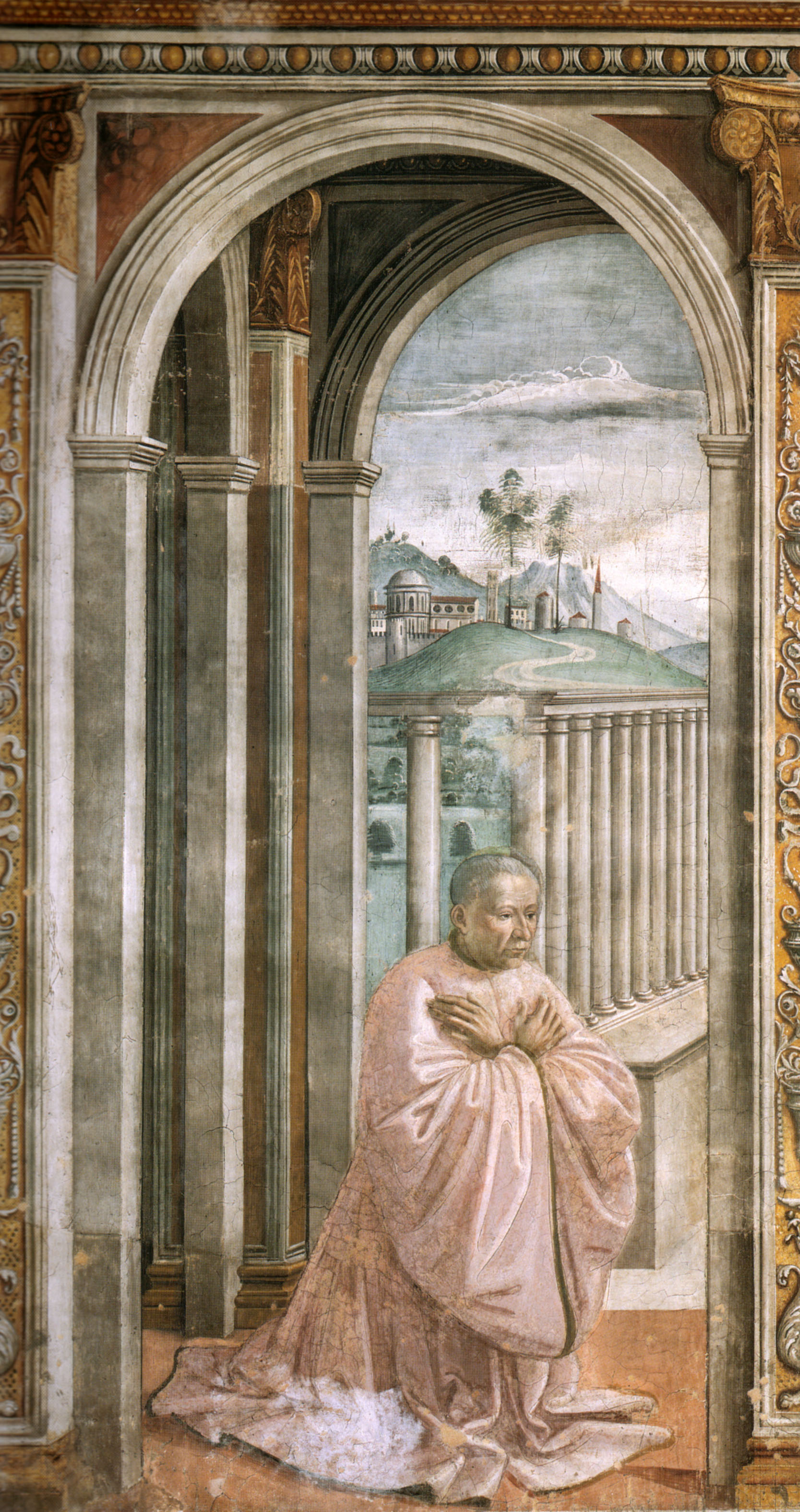
Giovanni Tornabuoni

The Tornabuoni Chapel (Italian: Cappella Tornabuoni) is the main chapel (or chancel) in the church of Santa Maria Novella, Florence, Italy. It is famous for the extensive and well-preserved fresco cycle on its walls, one of the most complete in the city, which was created by Domenico Ghirlandaio and his workshop between 1485 and 1490.

== History ==
The main chapel of Santa Maria Novella was first frescoed in the mid-14th century by Andrea Orcagna. Remains of these paintings were found during restorations in the 1940s: these included, mostly in the vault, figures from the Old Testament. Some of these were detached and can be seen today in the Museum of the church.

By the late 15th century, Orcagna's frescoes were in poor condition. The Sassetti, a rich and powerful Florentine family who were the bankers of the Medici, had long held the right to decorate the main altar of the chapel, while the walls and the choir had been assigned to the Ricci family. However, the Ricci had never recovered from their bankruptcy in 1348, and so they arranged to sell their rights to the choir to the Sassetti. Francesco Sassetti wanted the new frescoes to portray stories of St. Francis of Assisi; however, the Dominicans, to whom Santa Maria Novella was entrusted, refused. Sassetti therefore moved the commission to the church of Santa Trinita, where Ghirlandaio executed one of his masterworks, the Sassetti Chapel. The rights to the chapel in Santa Maria Novella that were lost by the Sassetti were then sold by the Ricci to Giovanni Tornabuoni.

Ghirlandaio, who then had the largest workshop in Florence, did not lose the commission however, because on September 1, 1485 Giovanni Tornabuoni commissioned him to paint the main chapel, this time with the lives of the Virgin and St. John the Baptist, patron of Tornabuoni and of the city of Florence. It is possible that the new scenes followed the same pattern as Orcagna's.

Ghirlandaio worked to the frescoes from 1485 to 1490, with the collaboration of his workshop artists, who included his brothers Davide and Benedetto, his brother-in-law Sebastiano Mainardi and, probably, the young Michelangelo Buonarroti.

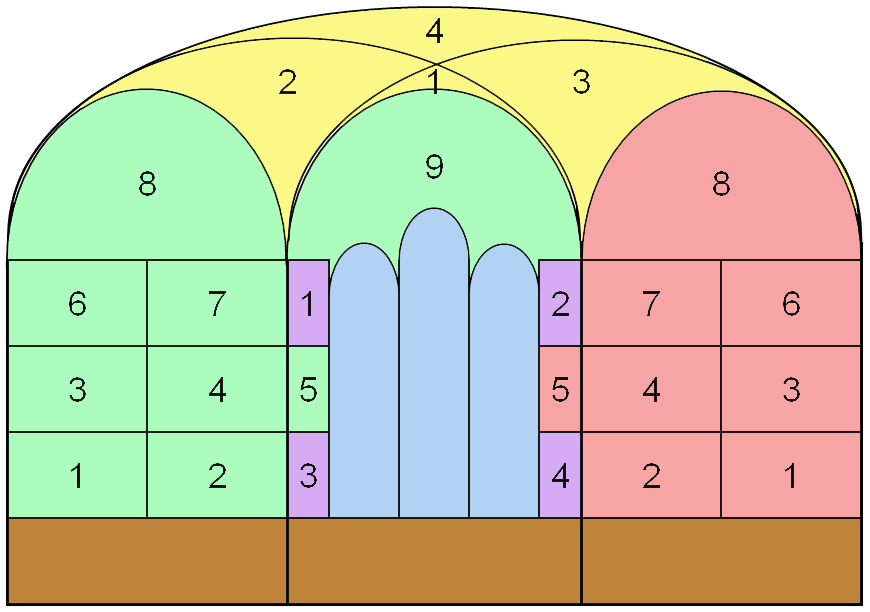
Structure of the cycle. In green: Stories of the Virgin. In red: Stories of St. John of the Baptist. In violet: Episodes of the Lives of Dominican Saints and the two patrons. In yellow: The Four Evangelists.

The windows were also executed according to Ghirlandaio's design. The complex was completed by an altarpiece portraying the Madonna del Latte in Glory with Angel and Saints, flanked by two panels with St. Catherine of Siena and St. Lawrence. On the recto a Resurrection of Christ was painted. This work is now held in Germany, divided between the Gemäldegalerie of Berlin and the Alte Pinakothek of Munich.

== Structure of the cycle ==
The cycle portrays on three walls the Life of the Virgin and the Life of St John the Baptist, the patron saint of Florence. The left and right walls each have three rows, each divided into two rectangular scenes framed by fictive architecture, and surmounted by a large lunette beneath the vault. Each side wall has a total of seven narrative scenes which are read beginning from the bottom.

The chancel wall has a large mullioned window of three lights with stained glass, provided in 1492 by Alessandro Agolanti after Ghirlandaio's design. On the lower part of the wall is a donor portrait of Giovanni Tornabuoni and his wife Francesca Pitti, while on either side of the window are four smaller scenes portraying Dominican saints. Above the window is another large lunette, containing the Coronation of the Virgin. In the vault are depicted the Four Evangelists.

The life of the Blessed Virgin

The scenes are on the left side of the chapel:

1. The Expulsion of Joachim from the Temple
2. The Nativity of Mary
3. Presentation of Mary at the Temple
4. The Marriage of the Virgin
5. The Annunciation (central wall, mid-left)
6. The Nativity of Christ (Adoration of the Magi)
7. The Massacre of the Innocents
8. The Death and Assumption of the Virgin (lunette)
9. The Coronation of the Virgin (lunette on central wall)

The life of St John the Baptist

The scenes on the right side of the chapel are:

1. The Apparition of the Angel to Zechariah
2. The Visitation
3. The Birth of the Baptist
4. Zechariah Writes His Son's Name
5. St. John in the Desert (central wall, mid-right)
6. The Preaching of the Baptist
7. The Baptism of Christ
8. Herod's Banquet (lunette)

Dominican saints and the donors

The scenes of the upper and lower tiers of the central wall are:

1. St. Dominic Tests Books in the Fire
2. The Killing of St. Peter Martyr
3. The patron Giovanni Tornabuoni
4. The patron, his wife Francesca Pitti

The four Evangelists

Depicted on the vault are:

1. St. John the Evangelist
2. St. Matthew
3. St. Luke
4. St. Mark

== Scenes from the life of the Blessed Virgin Mary ==
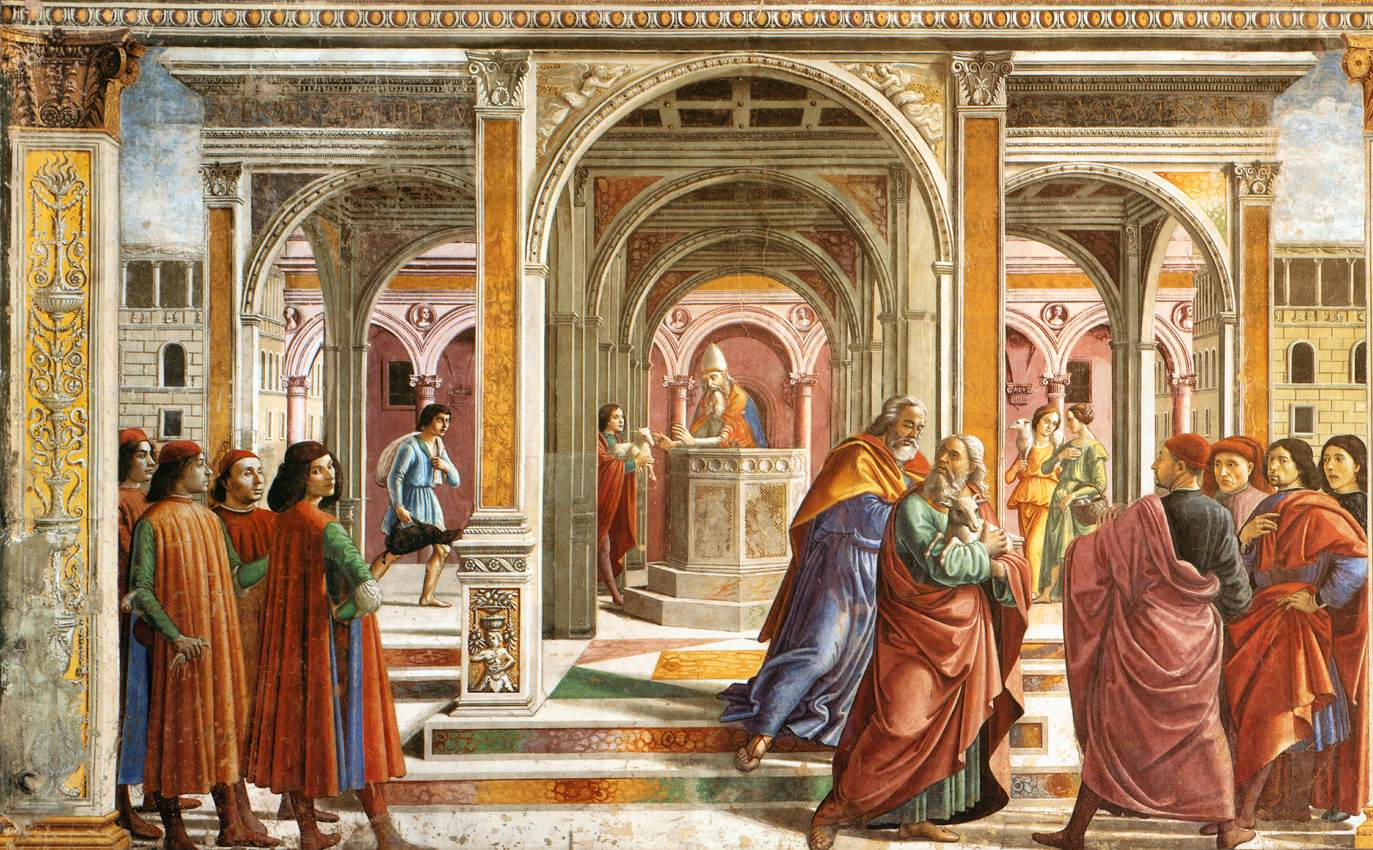
The Expulsion of Joachim from the Temple

=== Expulsion of Joachim ===
The first episode represents the expulsion of Joachim, the father of Mary, from the Temple of Jerusalem. A ceremony is taking place in which several figures are carrying lambs for sacrifice. However, Joachim was banned from attending due to his alleged sterility.

Ghirlandaio set the scene in a sumptuous loggia of Greek cross plan, with a sequence of arches in the background and an octagonal altar in the middle, where the sacrificial fire is lit. The characters are illuminated from above, as if by the natural lighting from the real chapel windows.

Two groups of Florentine people, representing the populace, are shown to the sides of the scene. They wear contemporary fashionable clothes (for which the frescoes are a famous source), unlike the main biblical figures, who wear the usual "iconographic costume". On the left, two figures may be identified as Lorenzo Tornabuoni, son of Ghirlandaio's patron, and Piero di Lorenzo de' Medici, the former's friend. In the righthand group is a self-portrait of the artist with some of his relatives. The loggia in the background could be a representation of the Ospedale di San Paolo (St. Paul's Hospital), which was then under construction in the same square as Santa Maria Novella. The two buildings on the sides are examples of typical edifices of 15th-century Florence, characterized by rustication and an upper loggia.

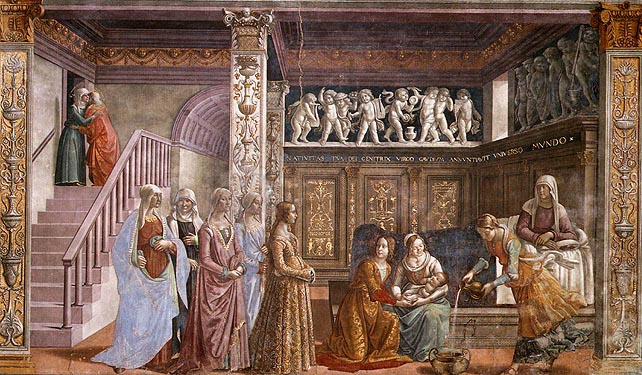
Nativity of Mary

=== Nativity of Mary ===
The second scene portrays the Nativity of Mary, set in a luxurious room with inlaid wooden panelling surmounted by a frieze in bas-relief of music-making putti and a cornice of winged cherubs. The room is divided by piers decorated in relief. To the left, near the door at the top of the stairs is shown symbolically an early incident of the story, the embrace of Anne and Joachim at the Golden Gate of Jerusalem.

To the right, St. Anne reclines in bed, while three young women prepare to bath the new-born Mary. The nurse who is pouring water into a basin is the only figure in the room to be moving rapidly. Her flowing robes and swirling scarf make her an iconic motif to be found in many paintings both by Ghirlandaio and other painters and sculptors of the period. A preparatory drawing of this woman has been preserved in the Cabinet of Prints and Drawings of the Uffizi.

Several well-dressed Florentine ladies have come on a congratulatory visit. The first in the procession of noblewoman, portrayed in profile, is Ludovica, daughter of Giovanni Tornabuoni. The rendering of the magnificent women's clothes is particularly notable. The scene is considered one of the best executed in the chapel. Unlike the previous scene, nearly all the portraits show a great care: they were probably executed by the master himself, while the less well executed are probably painted by his assistants.

Above the cabinets in the background is an inscription reading: "NATIVITAS TUA DEI GENITRIX VIRGO GAUDIUM ANNUNTIAVIT UNIVERSO MUNDO" ("Your birth, oh Virgin Mother, announced joy to the whole universe"), while in the intarsia decoration the artist put his signature: "BIGHORDI" (his true surname, Bigordi) and "GRILLANDAI" (the Florentine version of his nickname).

This scene, like the previous one, is realistically illuminated, with the frieze on the right in shadow. While the majority of scenes in the chapel have a completely symmetrical arrangement in their internal architecture and even the positioning of the figures, this picture is markedly asymmetrical, with a pier dividing it into two areas based on the golden mean. This asymmetrical structure links it to the scene of The Visitation in which a wall is placed to divide the picture space in the same manner. However the positioning of the figures, with St. Anne in bed and the group entering from the left is mirrored by The Birth of St John, although there the figures are placed in a much more conventional internal space.

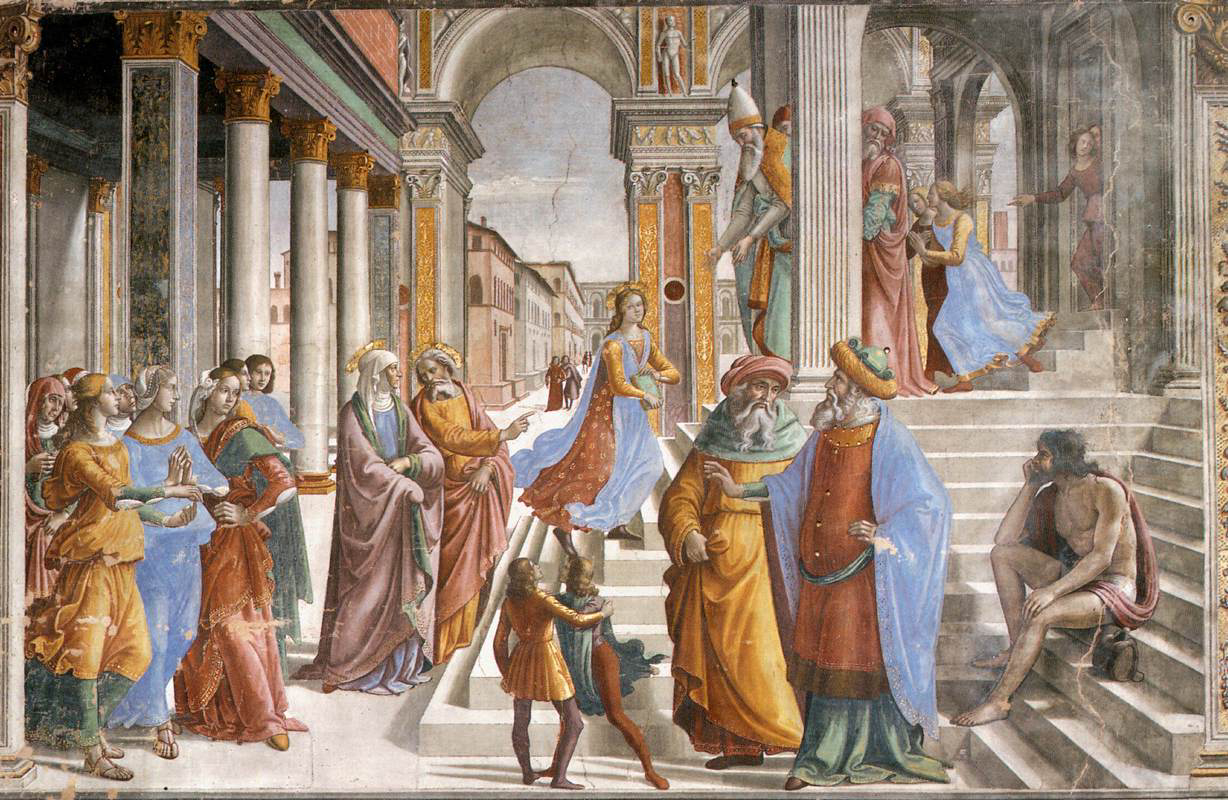
The Presentation at the Temple

=== Presentation at the Temple ===
The Presentation is a complex composition, with numerous characters placed on different levels. In the centre, the young Mary, holding a book, is ascending the Temple's staircase towards the priest, but is looking in the viewer's direction. Her awkward posture is perhaps intended to suggest her young shyness, but the figure appears rather awkward.

The role and meaning of the other figures who crowd the classical architectures of the scene are still partly unclear. The female figures on the right, portrayed with notable attention to detail, are probably portraits of real contemporary women. Next to them are St. Anne and Joachim, distinguishable by aureolas, who point at their daughter Mary. Two young women, painted by workshop collaborators, are rushing out from the Temple.

The two small figures in the centre foreground have not been identified. They could be children, but have adult features. It has been suggested that, being observed from below, they acquire a more youthful appearance, so their unusual rendering could be a technical trick by Ghirlandaio. The symbolic role of the nude man sitting on the steps, on the right, is unknown. Next to him are two old men.

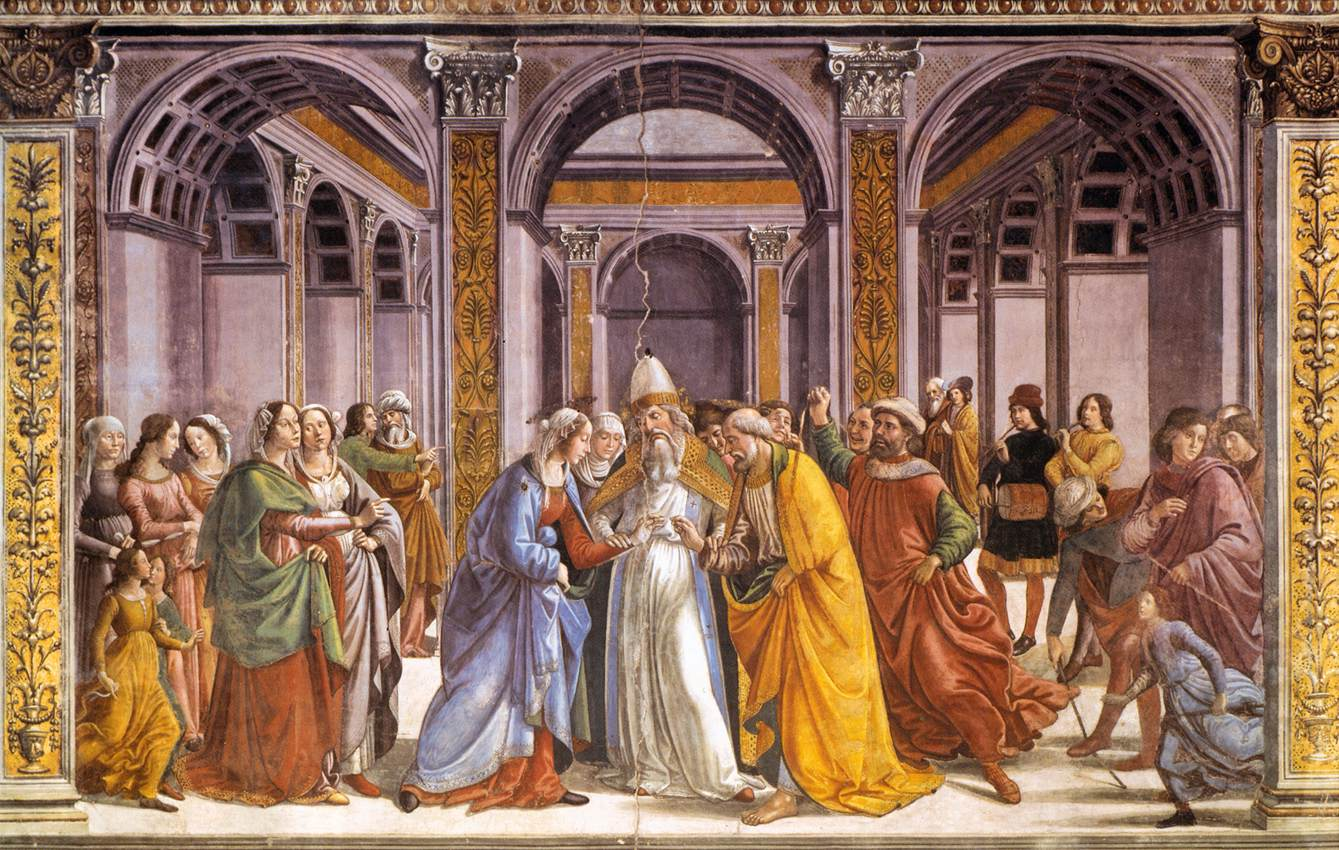
Marriage of the Virgin

=== Marriage of the Virgin ===
The Marriage of the Virgin is set in beautiful Renaissance architecture, while the composition of the scene is rather traditional. In the centre is the temple priest, with the same features as in the Presentation. He is sealing the marriage between Joseph and Mary. To the sides are two processions, with men on the left and women on the right. Some of the former, angry at having not been chosen to marry Mary, are shown while breaking their sticks or raising their fists (a story originating in apocryphal legends of the life of Mary). Joseph's club, which had been chosen as the most vigorous, is barely visible over his shoulder. Most of the portraits are summary in style, apart some very carefully executed ones near the priest.

It is not clear if the shorter figures in both lower corner are children or have a different symbolic meaning.

A preparatory sketch for this scene has been preserved in the Gabinetto dei Disegni e Stampe in the Uffizi, in which the priest in the centre is absent.

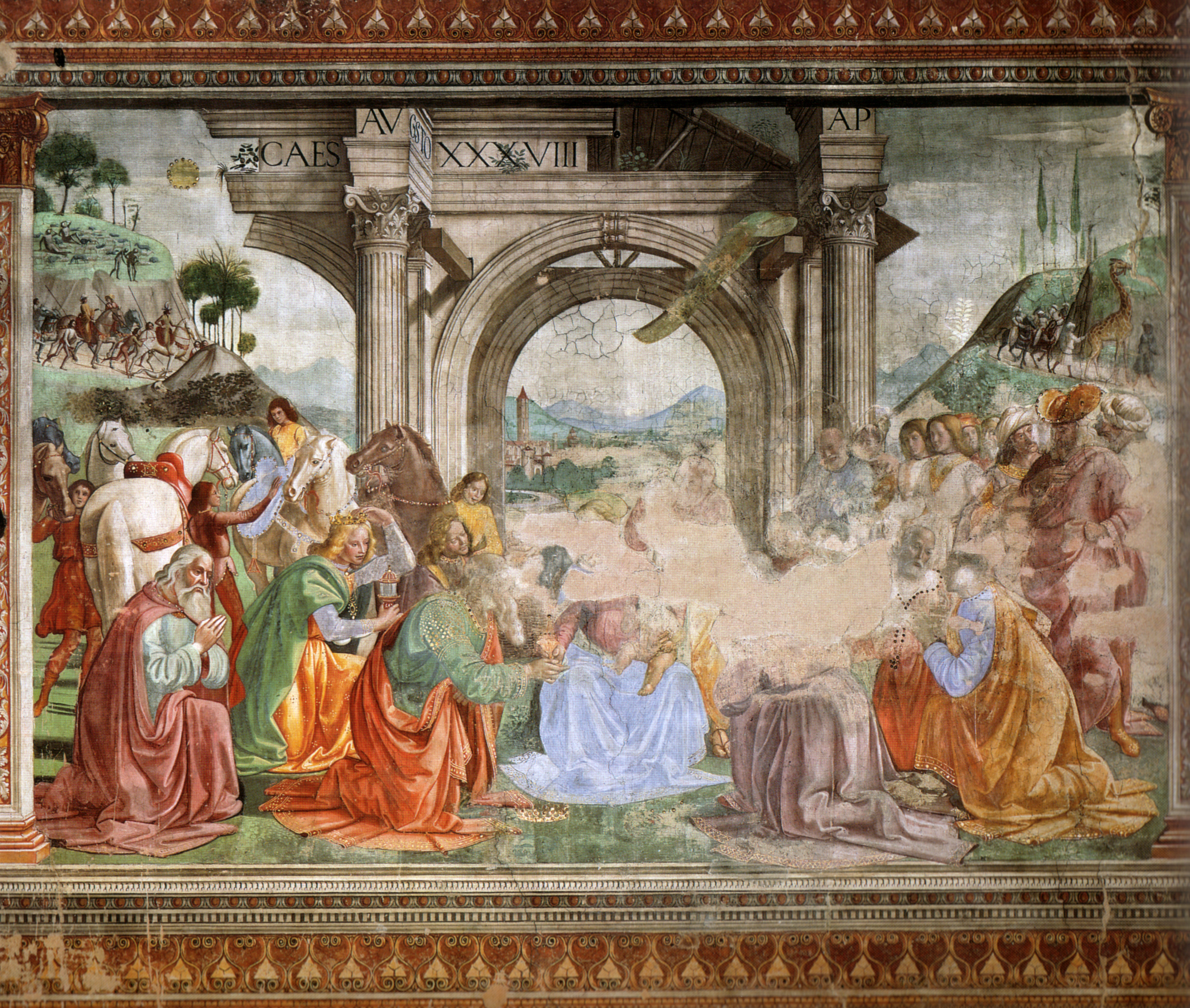
Adoration of the Magi

=== Adoration of the Magi ===
In several details this scene resembles the version in the Sassetti Chapel (also produced by Ghirlandaio), for example in the ruins and the hills which the Magis' procession is crossing. It is the most damaged section of the cycle, having lost much of the intonaco in the central area.

Mary and the Child Jesus are in the centre, framed by an arch with the inscription: CAES[AR] AUGUSTO XXXVIII AP. The Magi are finely executed: the younger one on the left in particular, who is already taking off his crown as a sign of deference.

The peacock on the arch is a symbol of the Resurrection. The men on the right, whose clothes suggest that they could be foreign ambassadors, are most likely portraits of Ghirlandaio's contemporaries. In the procession on the righthand hill a giraffe rendered with noteworthy realism can be seen (a giraffe had been presented to Lorenzo de' Medici and brought to Florence in 1486).

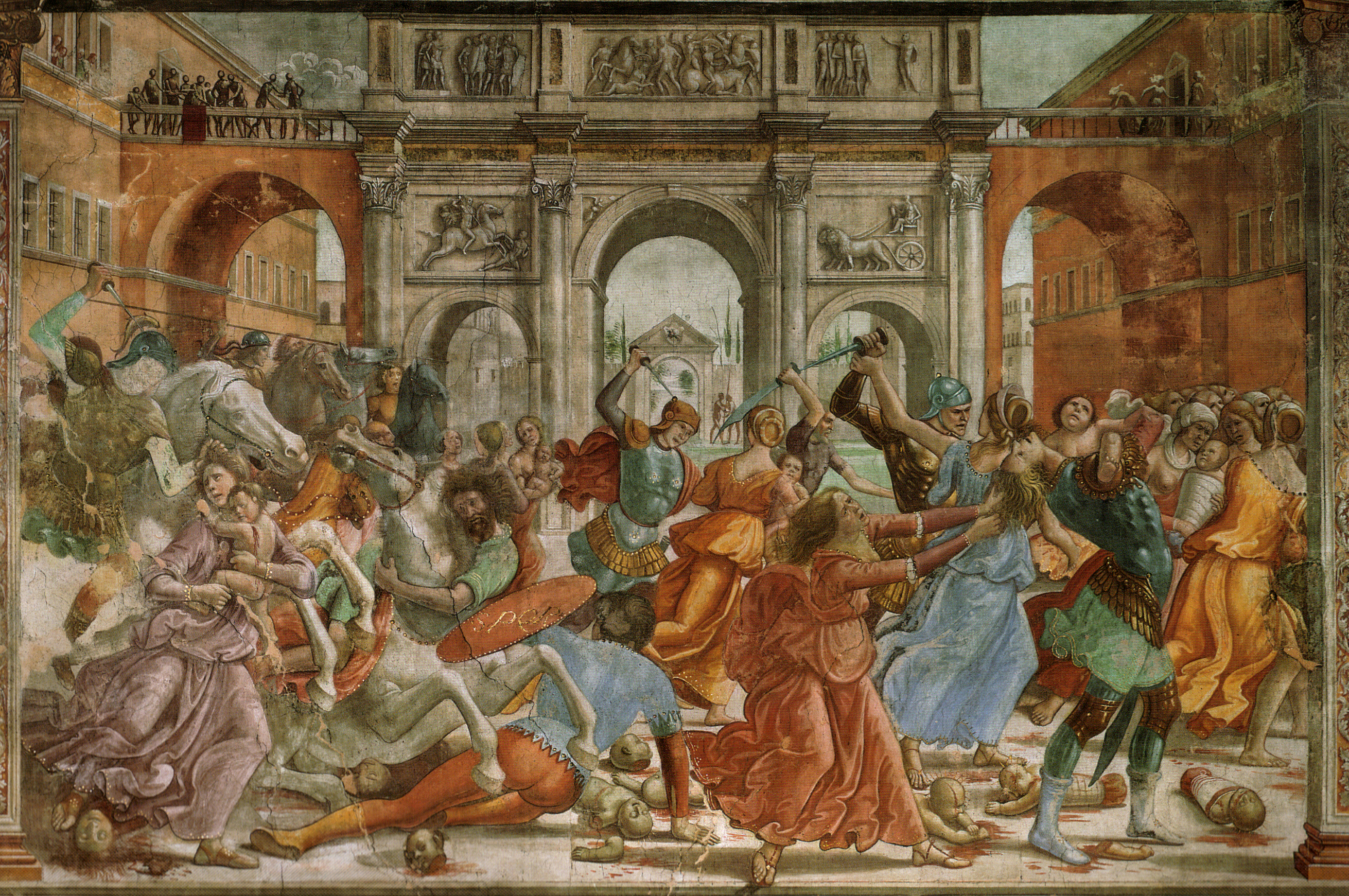
Massacre of the Innocents

=== Massacre of the Innocents ===
This scene was the one that Vasari, in his biography of Ghirlandaio, considered the best in the cycle, due to its dramatic and frantic composition. It is probable that Ghirlandaio was inspired by scenes of ancient Roman bas-reliefs, like that depicted on the arch in the background.

In the foreground are two mothers fighting to save their babies. The left one is escaping a horseman who is attacking her child with a dagger. The other, on the right, is grasping at the hair of a soldier who holds her child. Notable are the vivid colors and the moving rendering of the clothes.

On the ground are the corpses of numerous children, bleeding and with parts of their bodies severed. Behind on the right, the soldiers are attacking the mothers; one of the soldiers is dramatically falling from his horse. In the background, several people are viewing the scene from terraces connecting the two buildings on the sides with the central triumphal arch.

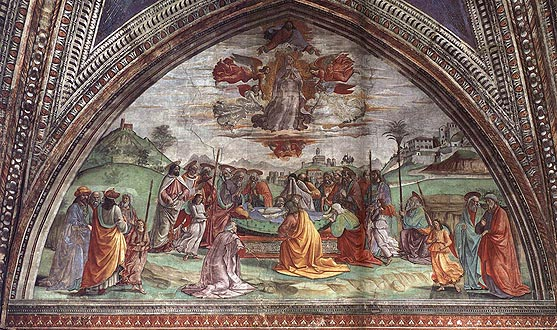
Death and Assumption of the Virgin

=== Death and Assumption of the Virgin ===
The left wall cycle culminates in the large lunette with the scene of Death and Assumption of the Virgin. The painting quality of this picture looks inferior to the rest, showing that Ghirlandaio left most of its execution to his workshop.

The body of the aged Virgin is lying on a lawn, surrounded by the Twelve Apostles who kiss her feet in a sign of deference, cry and pray. Angels are holding torches, while one of the Apostles holds a palm, a symbol of Resurrection.

In the upper part of the painting, the Virgin is shown again, young and attractive, within a mandorla supported by angels. God is welcoming her. In the background are hills with castles, fortified towns and (on the right) a villa, which is the Villa Medici in Fiesole.

The story of Mary ends in the central wall's lunette with the Coronation of the Virgin.

The cycle joins that of John the Baptist in the scene of the Visitation.

== Scenes from the life of St. John the Baptist ==
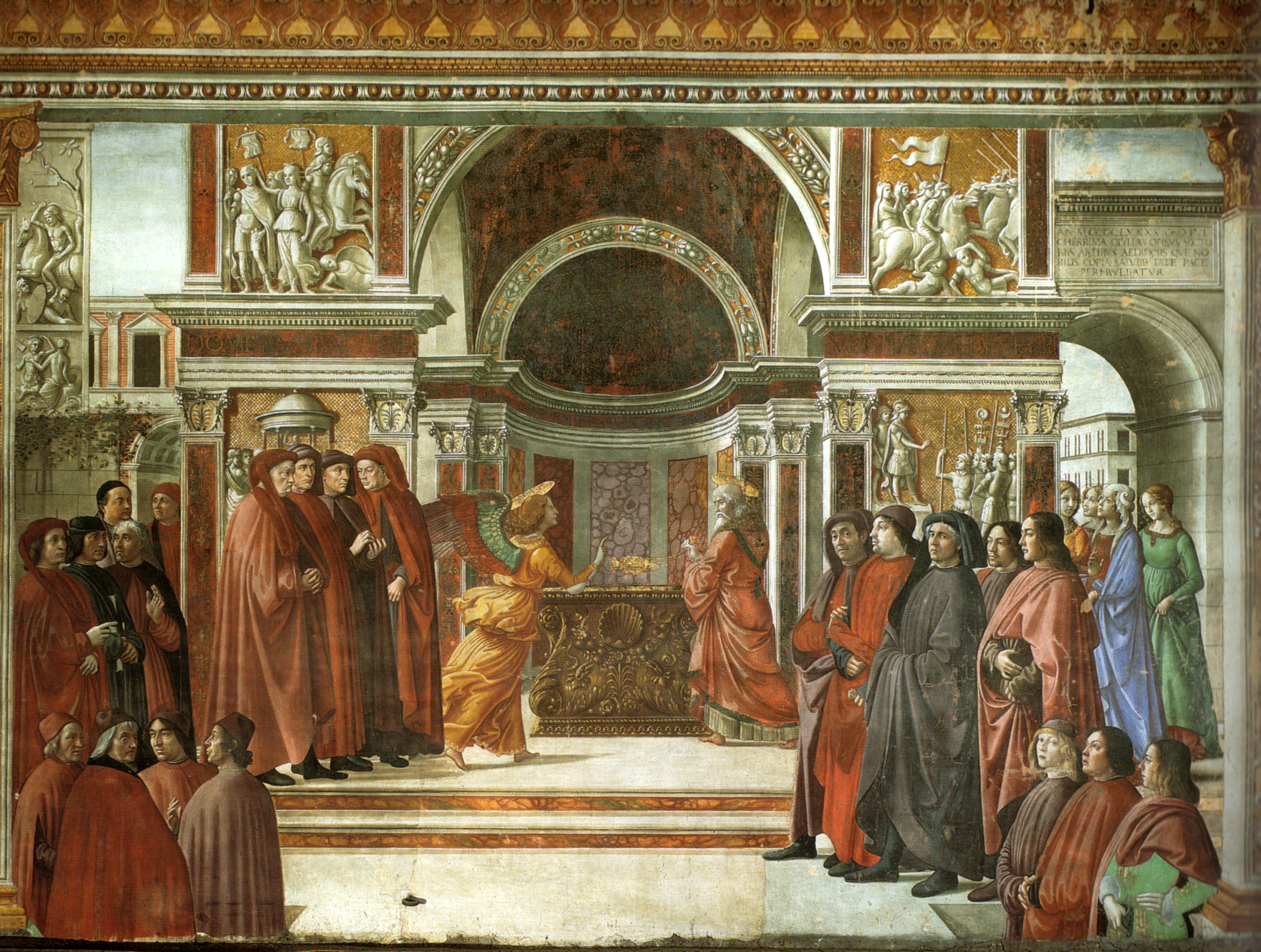
Apparition of the Angel to St. Zechariah

=== Apparition of the Angel to Zechariah ===
Like the others in the lower wall, this scene is one of the best in the cycle. The Biblical episode of the apparition of the Angel to Zechariah is portrayed within magnificent Renaissance church architecture. Zechariah is portrayed on the altar in the centre, with the Angel Gabriel suddenly appearing on his left to announce to him that he will have a son.

The scene is crowded with six groups of characters on six different levels. Aside from the group of six maidens on the right, the others are all portraits of contemporary Florentine notables. On the lower left are the Renaissance humanists, including Cristoforo Landino (the one with a black collar) and Agnolo Poliziano (the second from right). The figures standing on the right are relatives of the patron; behind them is a self-portrait of Ghirlandaio (the second from right, next to a youngster with long hair, probably his son or brother, who is also present in the Expulsion of Joachim).

The inscription on the arch at the left celebrates the completion of the cycle (in 1490), and has a quote by Agnolo Poliziano. The Classical-style altar resembles that painted by Leonardo da Vinci in his Annunciation.

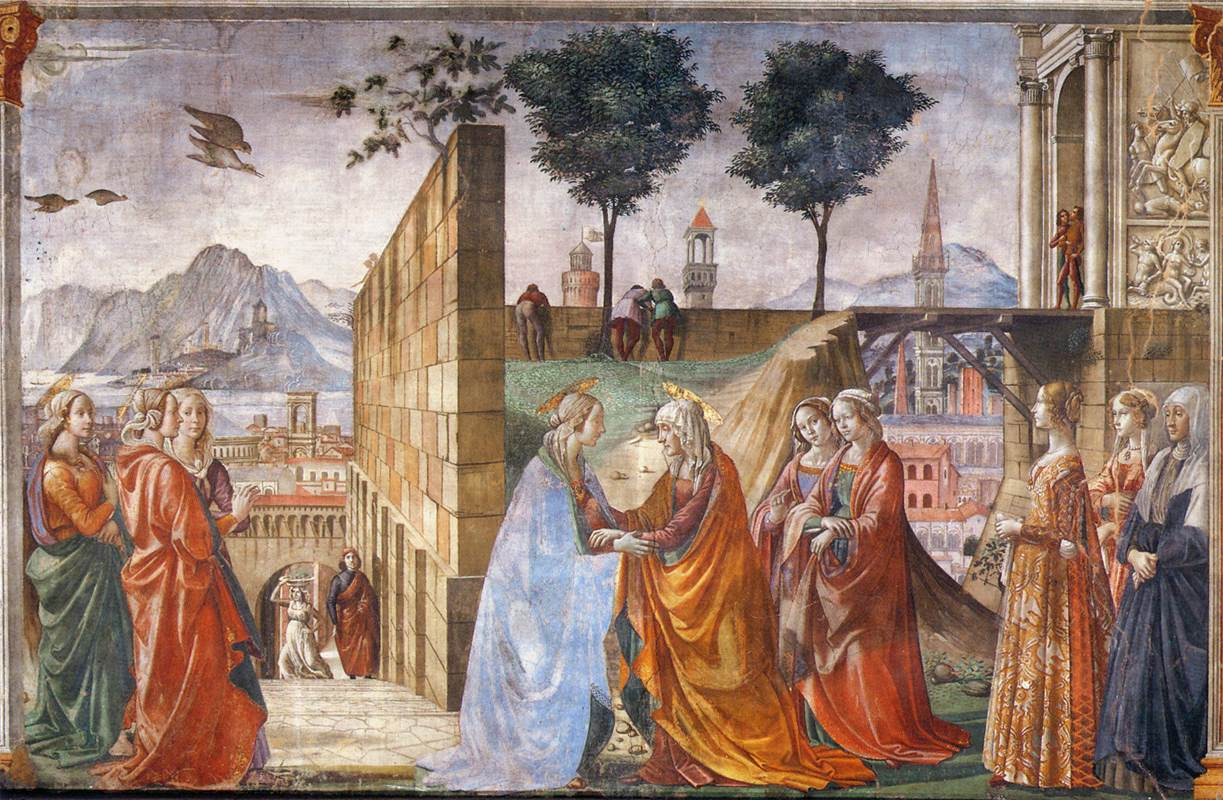
The Visitation

=== Visitation ===
This scene portrays the meeting of Mary with the aged Elizabeth. The complex composition includes in the centre the key episode, the relevance of which is strengthened by the converging lines of a wall in perspective and a ravine in the background. Behind Elizabeth are two maidens, while on the two extremities are other groups of women. The group on the right include portraits of contemporaries: the first, in profile, is Giovanna degli Albizzi, who had married Giovanni Tornabuoni's son Lorenzo. Vasari wrongly identified her as Ginevra de' Benci.

The fine background shows the influence of both classical and Flemish art on Ghirlandaio. On the right is an ancient edifice, while the city landscape on the right is typical of Early Netherlandish painting. The balcony in the middle with two young men stretching out is probably a reference to Jan van Eyck's Madonna of Chancellor Rolin, or to Rogier van der Weyden's St. Luke Painting the Madonna. Two other figures are portrayed walking upwards next to the dividing wall. The city is fanciful, but details like the tower of Florence's Palazzo Vecchio and the Santa Maria Novella campanile, as well as Rome's Colosseum are from real buildings.

All the elements in this picture were explicitly required in Tornabuoni's contract with Ghirlandaio: the landscape, the city, the animals, the perspective, the portraits and the classical elements.

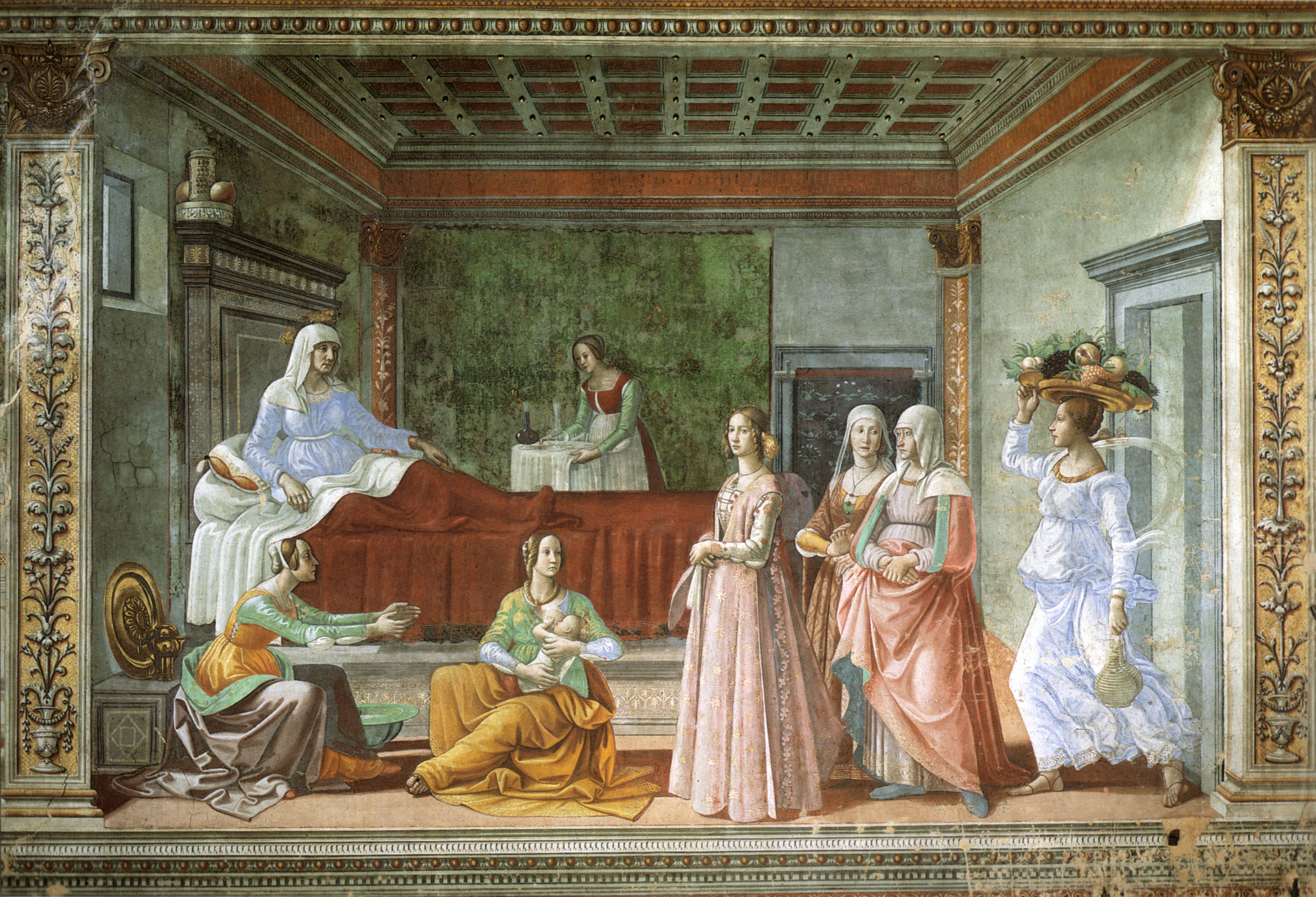
Birth of the Baptist

=== Birth of the Baptist ===
This scene is linked with that in the opposite wall, the Birth of the Virgin, with which it shares an element of composition having the bed placed symmetrically. This room is less luxurious than the other, but still probably portrays that of a rich Florentine merchant of the time.

The light falls heavily on the figures in the foreground, while the others are partially in shade. Elizabeth is depicted on the bed in a calm and majestic posture, with a book in her left hand. As in the other scene, there are two nurses painted with brilliant colours to attract the watcher's attention. Three women, also in the foreground, are visiting Elizabeth. The first, luxuriously dressed, could be a relative of the Tornabuoni. Of the two other figures, the older is most likely Lucrezia Tornabuoni, Giovanni's sister, who had recently died. The maid entering from the right with a basket of fruit on her head resembles both one of the nymphs of Botticelli's Primavera and the Salome painted by Filippino Lippi in the Prato Cathedral. In a preparatory drawing now in the Gemäldegalerie, Berlin the maid is in fact Salome carrying the Baptist's head.

Notable is the attention to domestic detail, which shows again the influence on Ghirlandaio of the Netherlandish school, which was being felt in Tuscany during this period: the two bottles of wine and water held by the maid, the bed-frame with a vase and the two pomegranates over the bed.

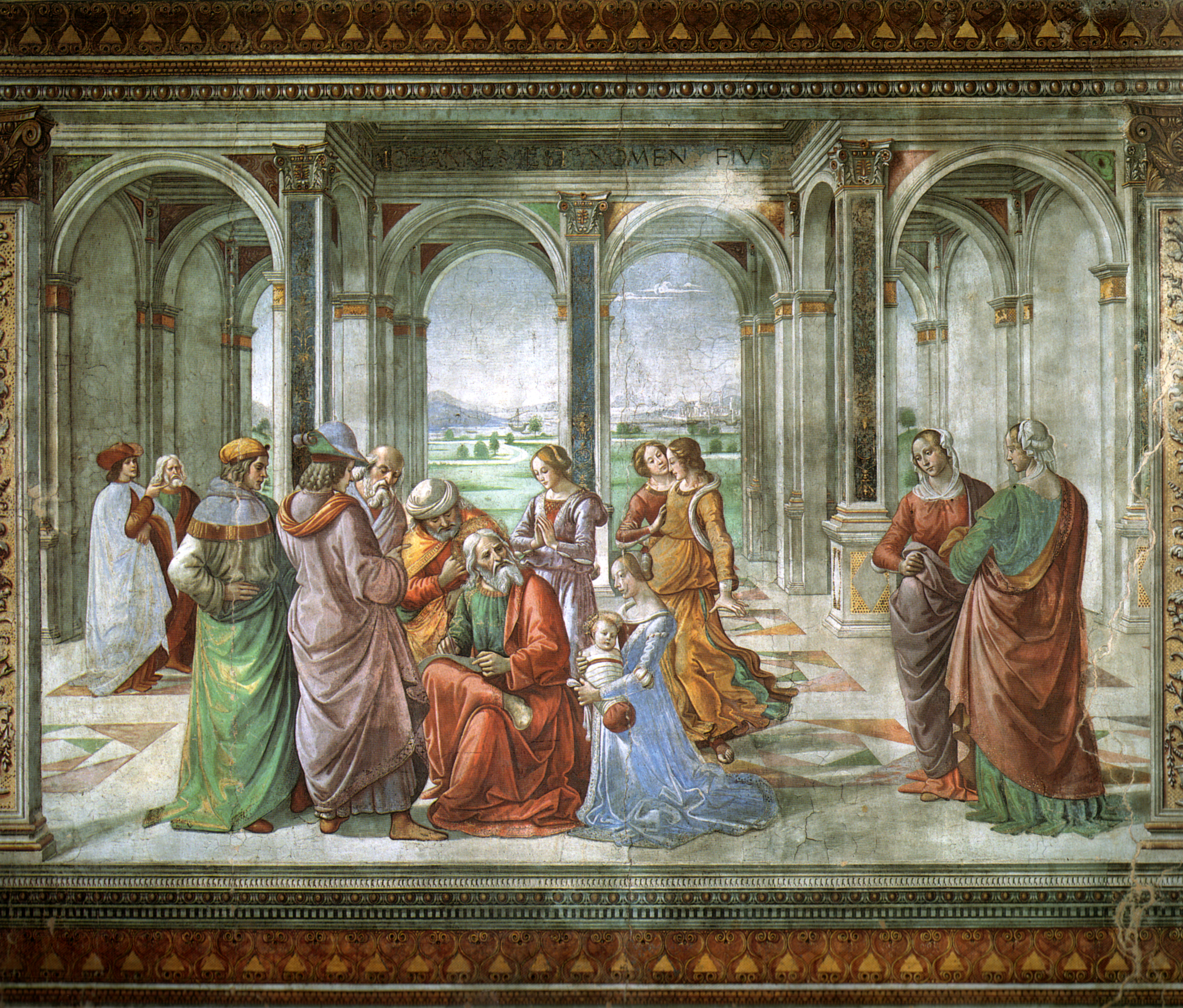
Zechariah Writes John's Name

=== Zechariah Writes John's Name ===
This scene depicts the moment in which Zechariah, now mute, writes his new son's name on a sheet of paper. It is set under a large portico, which opens on a magnificent landscape created according to aerial perspective.

The main scene is in the middle, with Zechariah sitting and looking at his son, who is held in Elizabeth's arm. The figures on the left are symmetrically balanced by a group of two women on the right: this composition allowed the child to appear exactly in the middle of the scene, aligned with the central pilaster of the portico. Behind Zechariah are two old men, while a younger figure, in contemporary clothes, is portrayed from the back.

The Gabinetto delle Stampe e dei Disegni of the Uzzi houses a preparatory sketch for the women on the left.

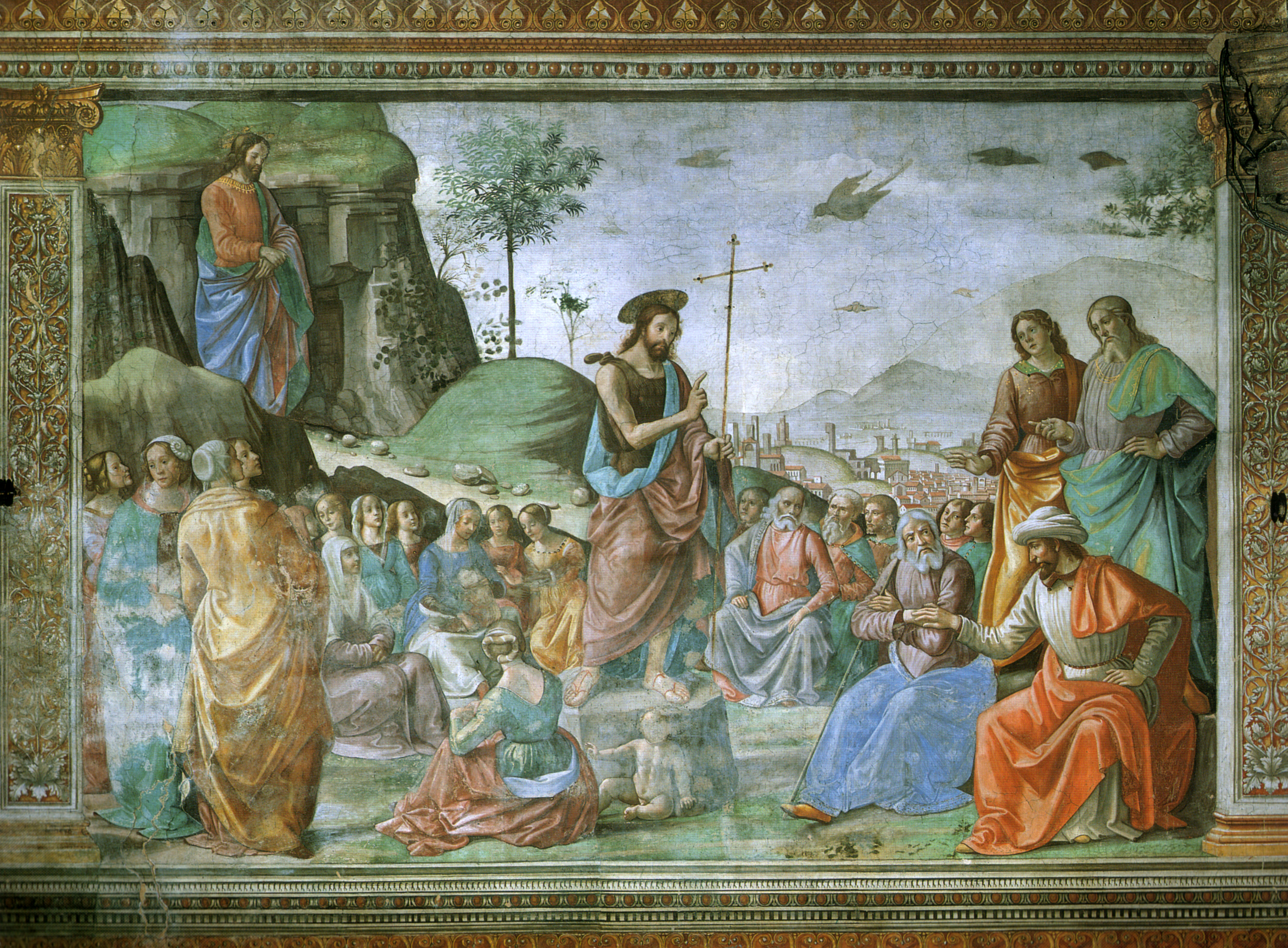
Predication of the Baptist

=== John preaches in the wilderness ===
In this scene John the Baptist is portrayed in the centre, on a rock, while instructing a crowd who form a circle around him. He wears the camelskins mentioned in the Gospels and is pointing at the cross. A listening Jesus can be seen on the path in the upper left corner.

As often with Ghirlandaio, there is a group of women on the left. Of particular interest are the woman sitting in the centre, and the child at John's feet.

The execution of the other figures is rather hasty, and is most likely by the artist's workshop, as are many other details in the scenes of the upper chapel walls.

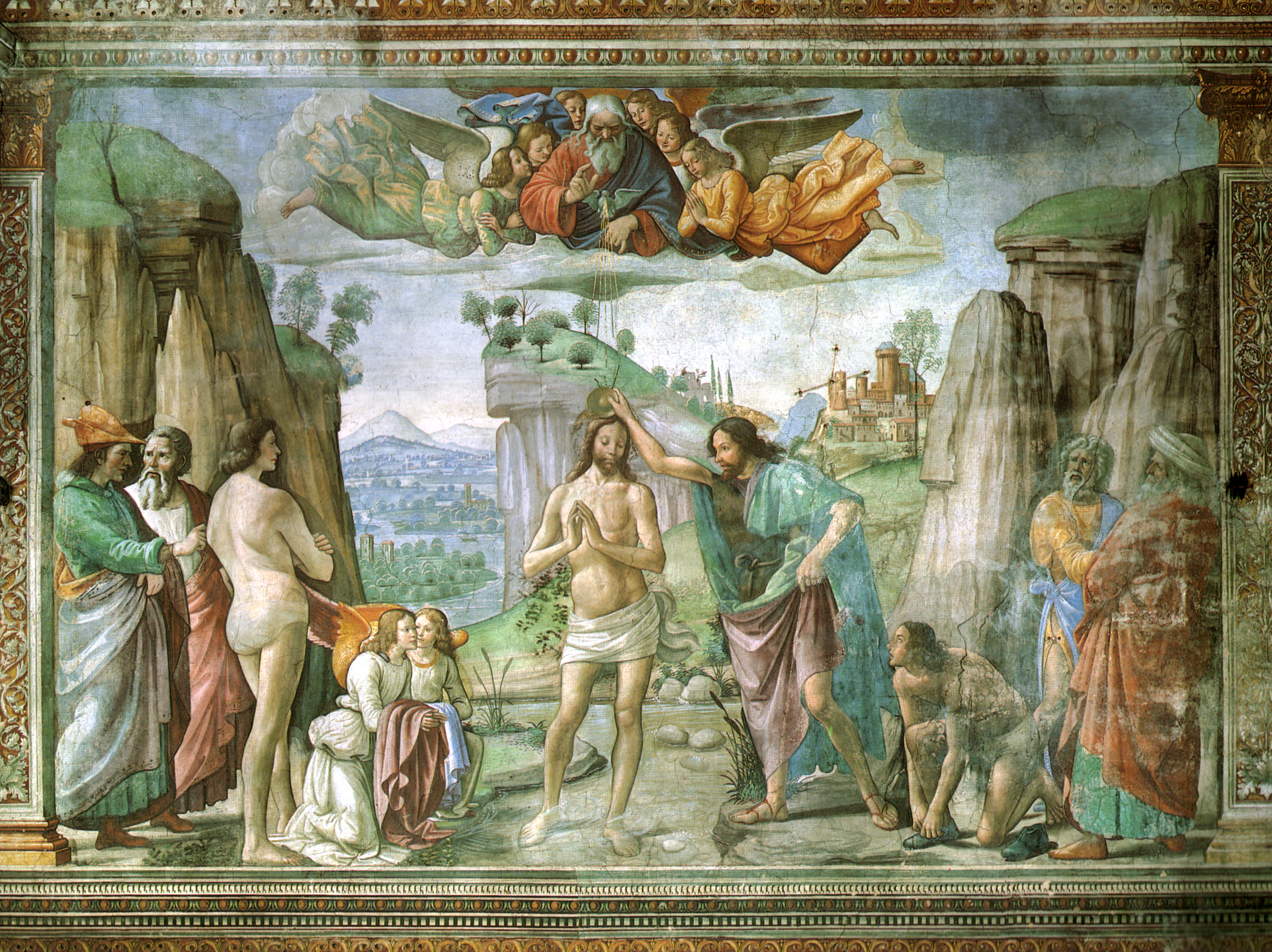
Baptism of Christ

=== Baptism of Christ ===
The scene of the baptism follows a traditional scheme: for example, the naked man resembles that of Masaccio's Brancacci Chapel, while the Christ is similar to the panel by Verrocchio and Leonardo at the Uffizi.

Notable is the figure of the kneeling man on the right, who is removing his shoes while looking with curiosity at the scene, while traditional portrayal is again seen with God giving his blessing between the angels, in the upper area, which is in a quasi-Late Gothic style.

The graceful landscape in the background is divided by a spur which creates a frame around Christ's figure. The two pairs of figures at the sides, again hastily painted, were executed by Ghirlandaio's workshop following his design.

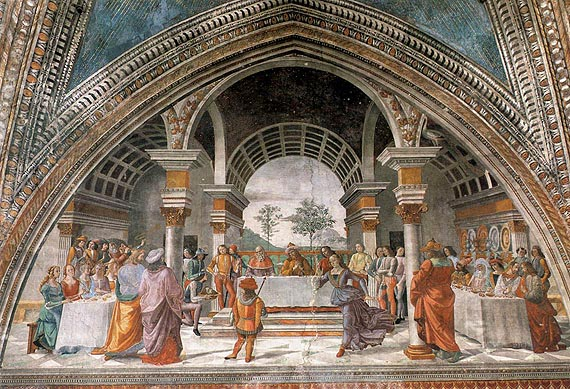
Herod's Banquet

=== Herod's Banquet ===
The scene of Herod's banquet concludes the story of St. John the Baptist. It is set within a majestic, classical-style hall with a painted arch. The barrel vault resembles that of the Basilica of Maxentius in Rome. Two tables along the sides underline the perspective-based composition: the women sit at the left one, while the men are seated at the right. Behind the women is a group of musicians.

At the table in the centre is Herod, with an open window behind him. In the foreground Salome is portrayed performing her dance. Other men (including a dwarf) are looking on the left, where a servant is handing over John's head to Herod. A man nearby is making a gesture of disgust at the sight. The scene is inspired by the work of Filippo Lippi in Prato Cathedral, but is of lesser dramatic quality; the artwork was most likely provided by Ghirlandaio's workshop almost entirely.

== Central wall ==
On the middle wall are portrayed the following scenes:

- Coronation of the Virgin and Saints (lunette)
- St. Dominic Tests Books in the Fire (#1 in violet - see figure)
- Killing of St. Peter Martyr (#2 in violet - see figure)
- Annunciation (#5 in green - see figure)
- St. John in the Desert (#5 in red - see figure). This painting depicts John wandering in the desert during his youth.
- The Patrons in Prayer (#3 and #4 in violet). These are the portraits of the two patrons, Giovanni Tornabuoni and his wife Francesca Pitti.

== Vault ==
In the groin-vault are four Evangelist portraits; they write or show their work (apart St. Mark, who is cutting his pen with a knife), flanked by their symbols.

In reference to the figure, they are:

- St. John the Evangelist (1 yellow)
- St. Matthew (2 yellow)
- St. Luke (3 yellow)
- St. Mark (4 yellow)

As in the Sassetti Chapel, and despite being distant from the viewer, the paintings are very well executed, being largely by Ghirlandaio himself. This can be seen, for example, in the realistic rendering of Luke's ox.

The Four Evangelists

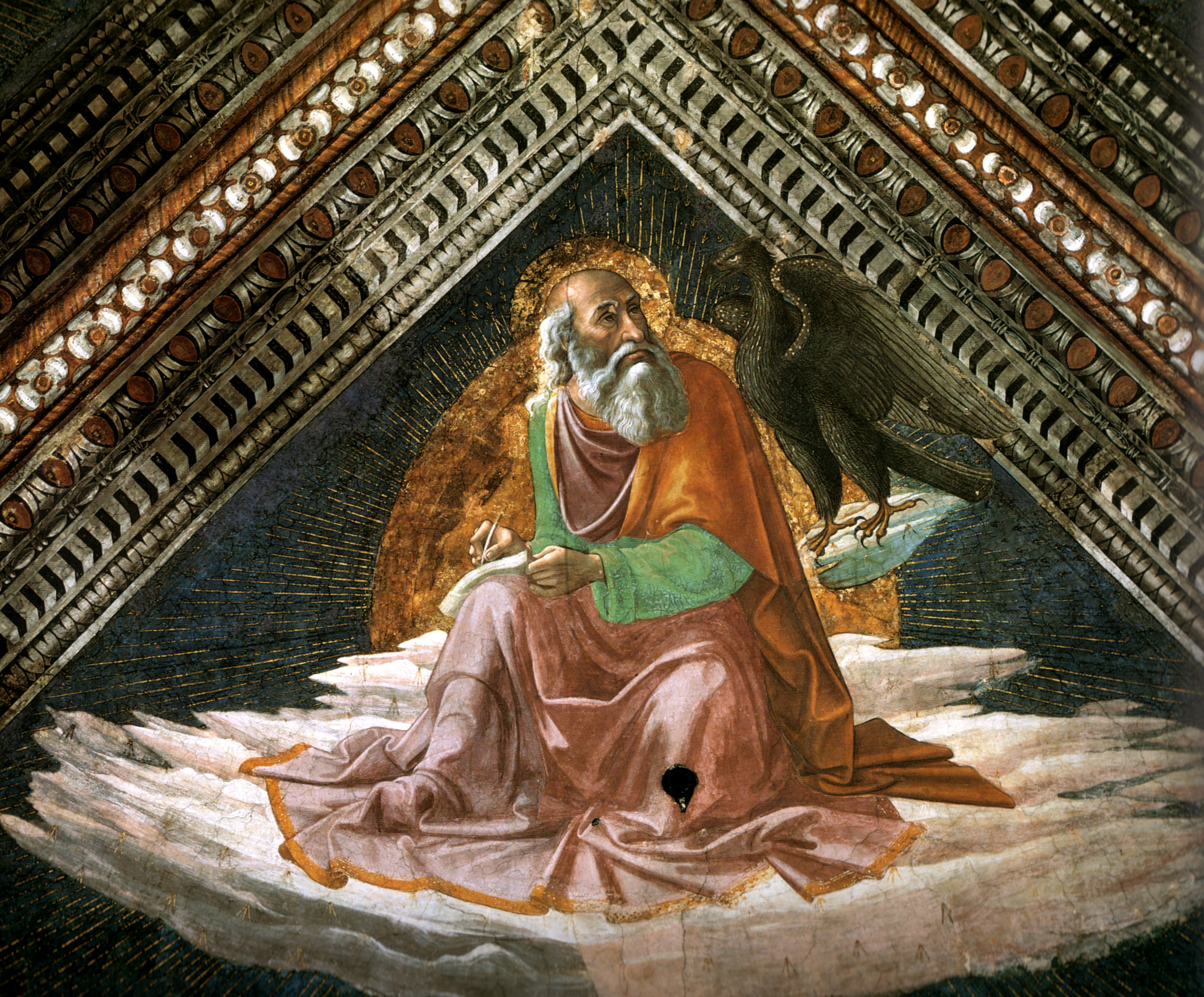
St. John

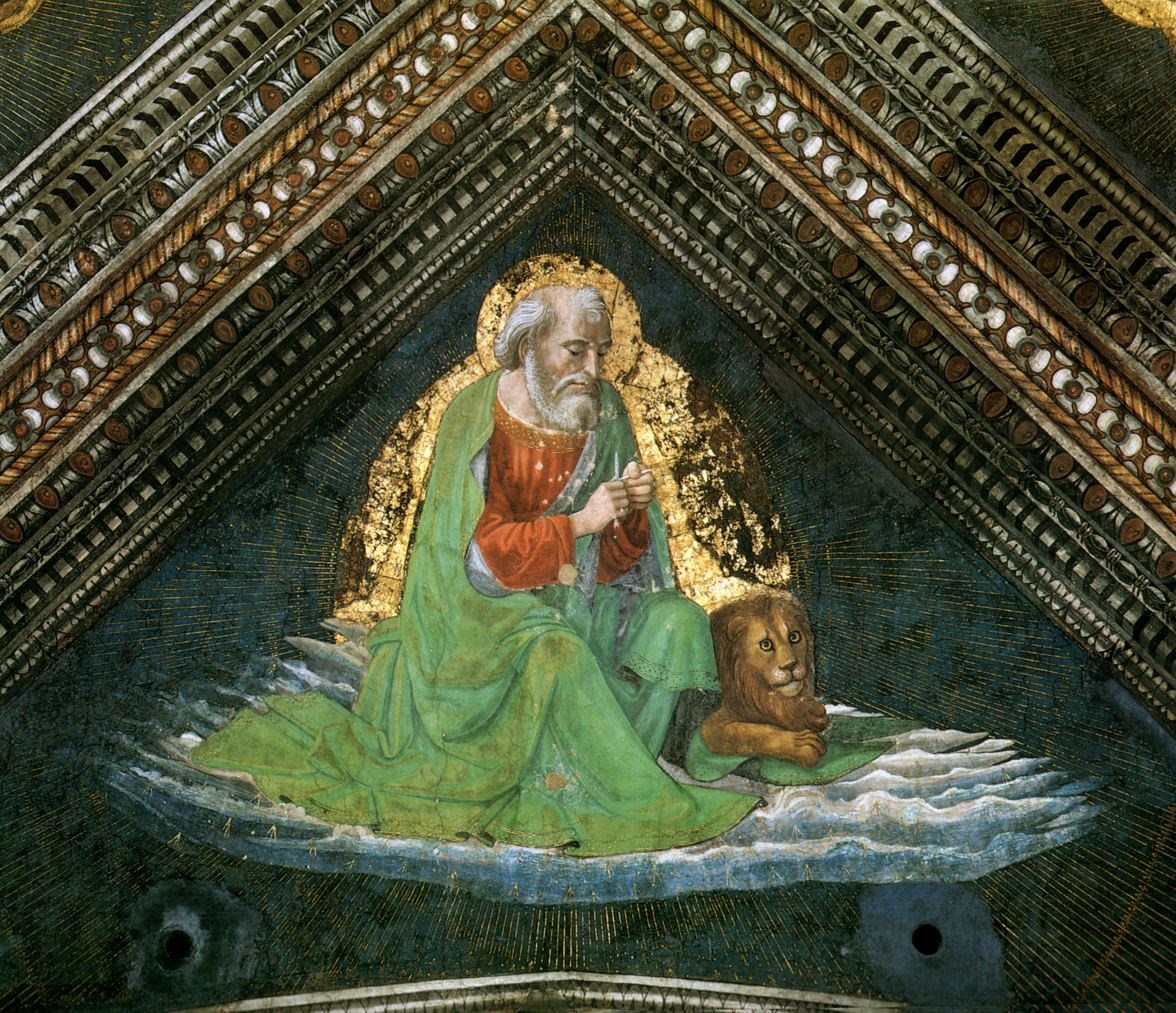
St. Mark

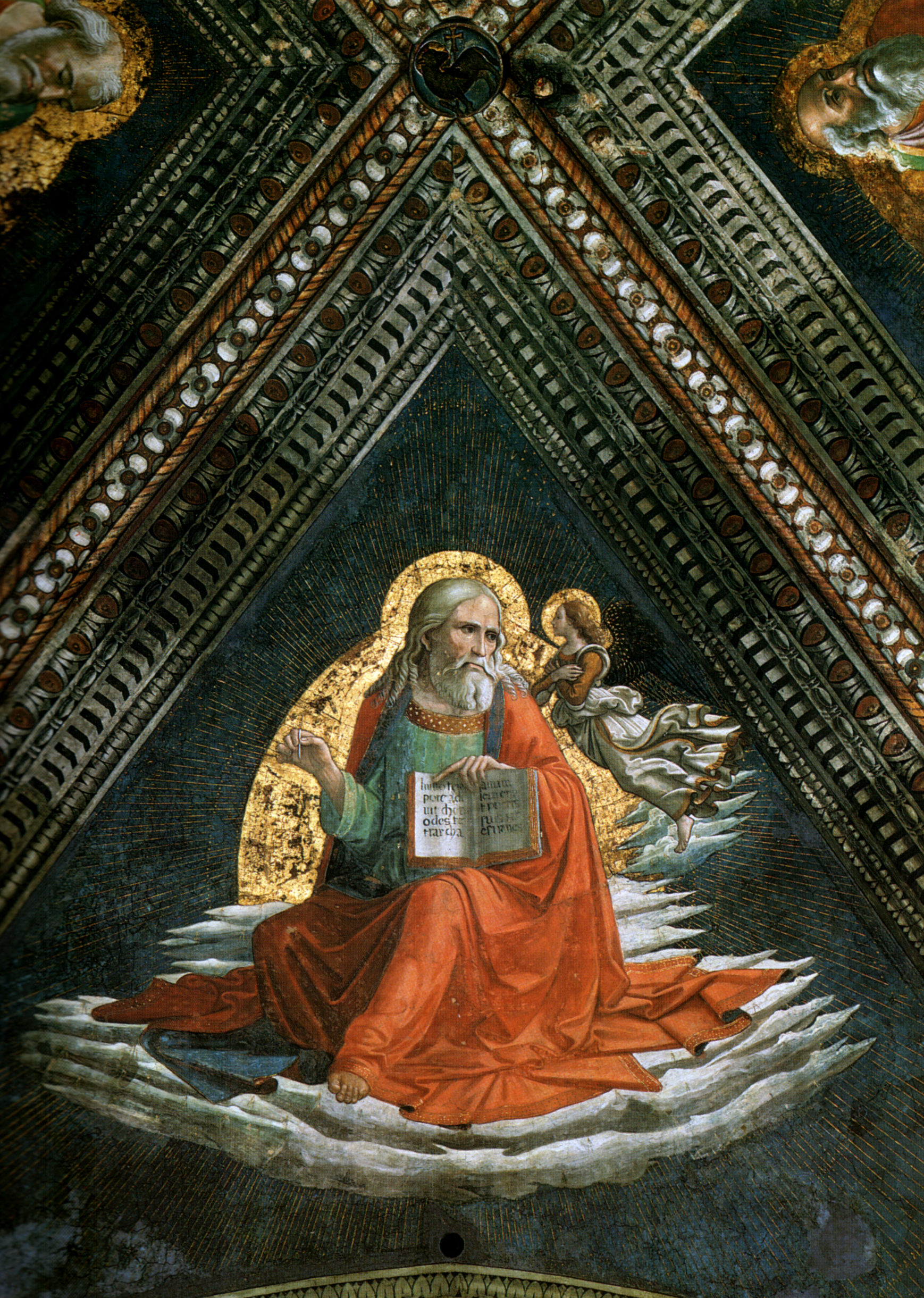
St. Matthew

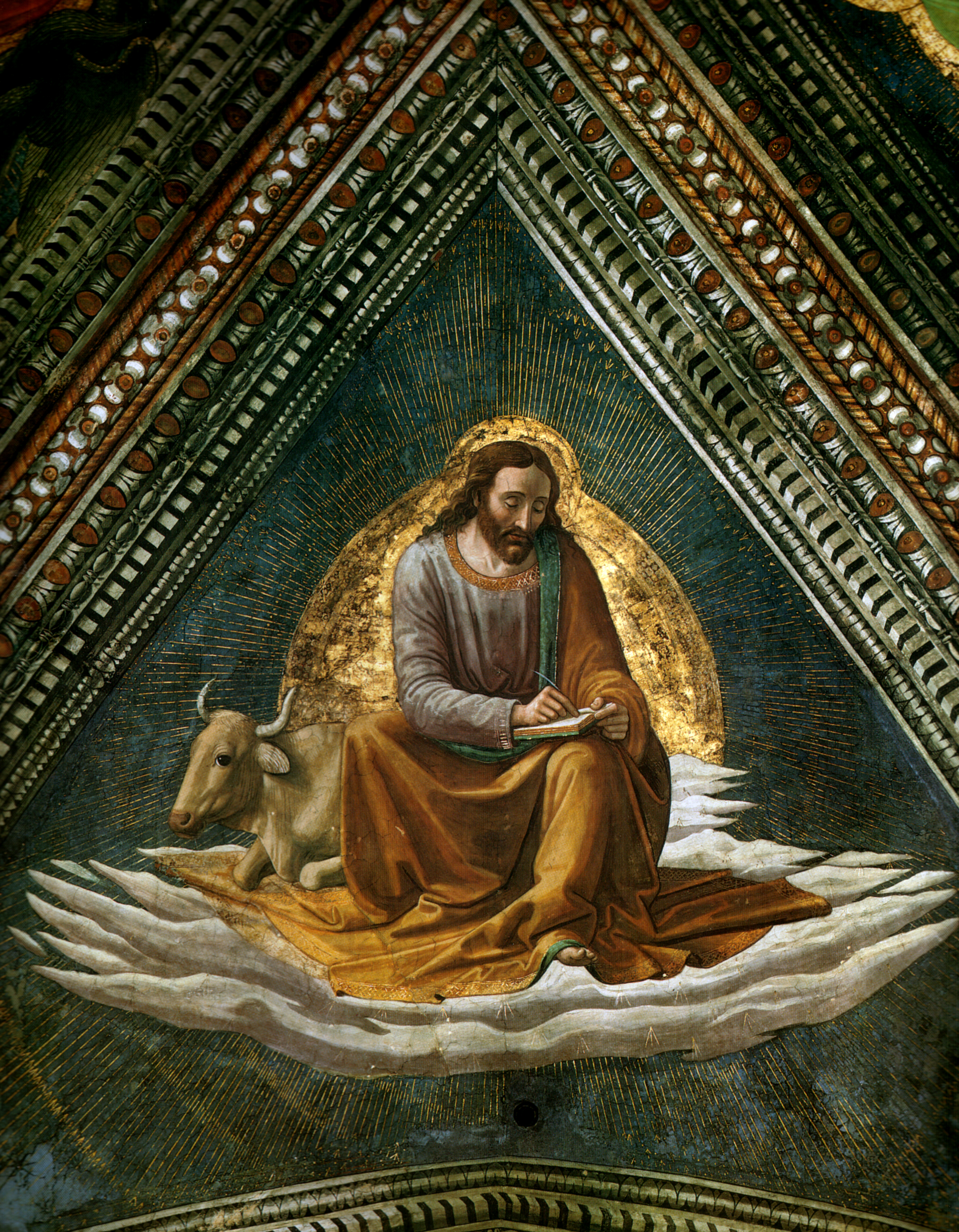
St. Luke

== Choir and other furniture ==
The magnificent wooden choir was carved by Baccio d'Agnolo during the same period as the execution of the frescoes (1485-1490). Two of the scenes, St. John in the Desert and St. Lawrence, are attributed to Filippino Lippi, who at the time was working at the Filippo Strozzi Chapel in the same church. The choir was restored by Vasari in 1566.

The altar is a neo-Gothic creation from the 19th century. The crucifix is by Giambologna, while the right paschal candle is attributed to Piero di Giovanni Tedesco (late 14th century); the similar left one is a modern reproduction.
