= Tornabuoni Altarpiece =

Altarpiece by Domenico Ghirlandaio and his studio

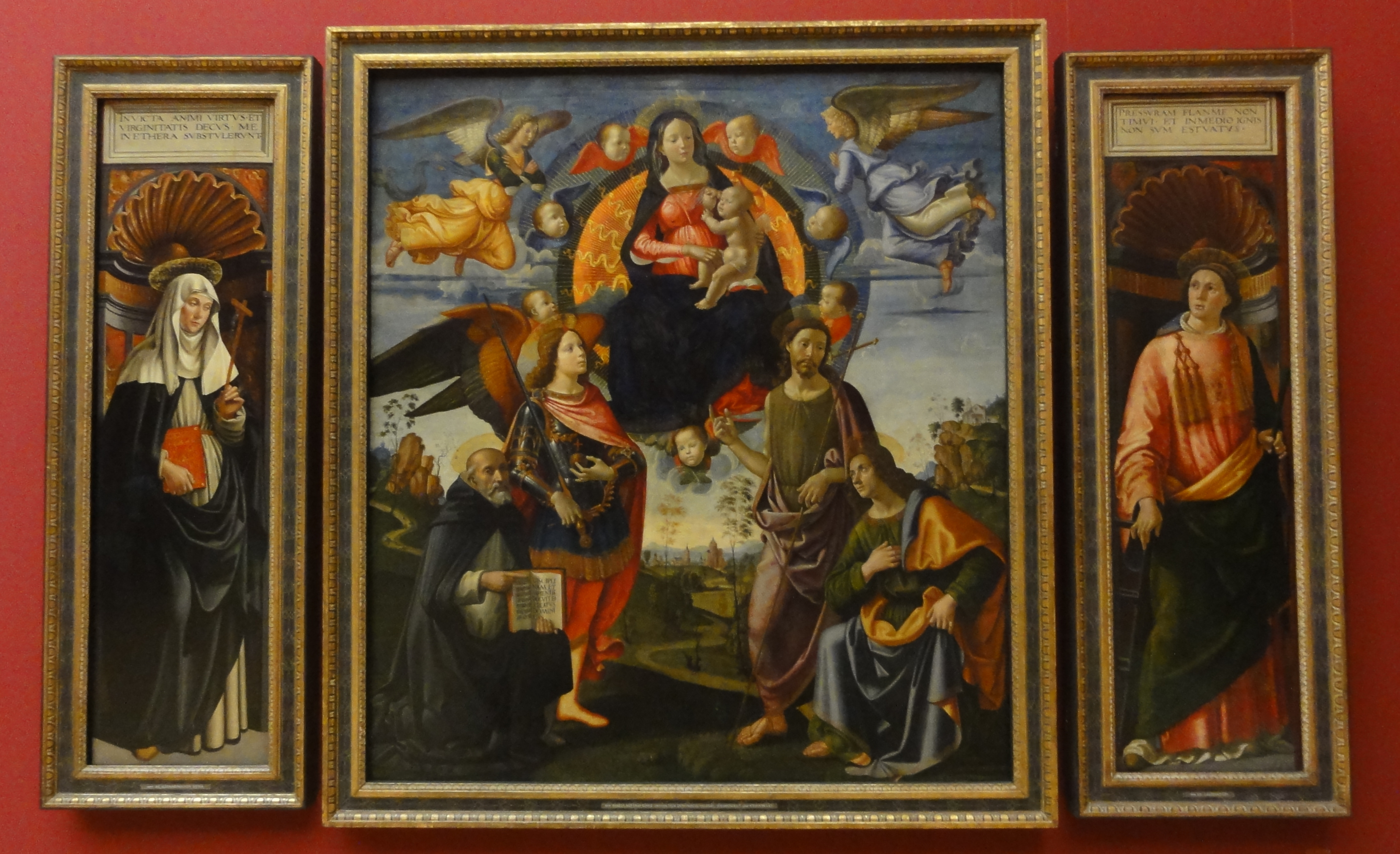
Central panel and two side panels, Alte Pinakothek

The Tornabuoni Altarpiece (Italian - Pala Tornabuoni) is a tempera on panel painting by Domenico Ghirlandaio and his studio as the high altarpiece for the Tornabuoni Chapel in Santa Maria Novella. It was begun around 1490 and completed around 1498, four years after the painter's death. It is now split between several museums, with the central panel and two others now in the Alte Pinakothek in Munich.

== Panels ==
- Madonna in Glory with Saints, Saint Catherine of Siena and Saint Laurence, Alte Pinakothek, Munich
- Resurrection (reverse), Gemäldegalerie, Berlin
- Saint Stephen, Museum of Fine Arts, Budapest
- St Peter Martyr, Fondazione Magnani Rocca, Traversetolo (province of Parma)
- Saint Vincenzo Ferrer and Saint Anthony of Padua, previously Kaiser-Friedrich-Museum, Berlin, destroyed in May 1945 in the burning of the Flakturm Friedrichshain
