= Lucrezia Tornabuoni =

Wife of Piero di Cosimo de' Medici (1427–1482)

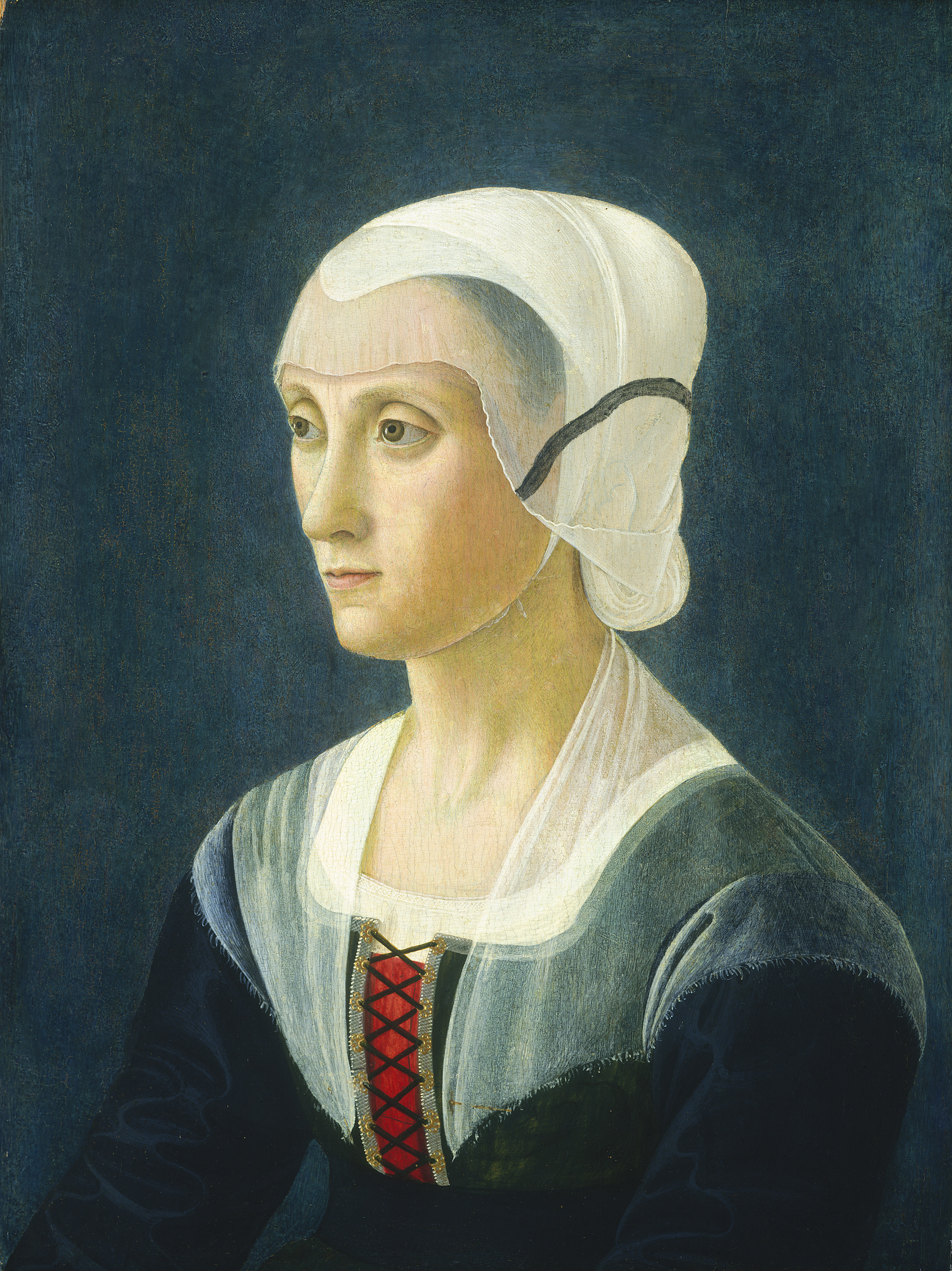
- Portrait by Domenico Ghirlandaio, c. 1475, at the National Gallery of Art in Washington, D.C.

Lady of Florence
- Tenure: 1 August 1464 – 2 December 1469
- Born: 22 June 1427; Florence
- Died: 28 March 1482 (aged 54); Florence
- Noble family: Tornabuoni
- Spouse: Piero di Cosimo de' Medici
- Issue: Bianca de' Medici; Lucrezia de' Medici; Lorenzo de' Medici; Giuliano de' Medici; Maria de' Medici; Two sons
- Father: Francesco di Simone Tornabuoni
- Mother: Nanna Guicciardini or Francesca Pitti

Lucrezia Tornabuoni (22 June 1427 – 28 March 1482) was an Italian noblewoman and writer, wife of Piero di Cosimo de' Medici, de facto Lord of Florence and his political adviser. Lucrezia had significant political influence during the rule of her husband and then of her son Lorenzo the Magnificent, investing in several institutions and improving relationships to support the needs of the poor. She was also a patroness of the arts who wrote several poems and plays.

== Early life ==
Lucrezia was born in Florence, Italy, on 22 June 1427. Her father was Francesco di Simone Tornabuoni, a member of a noble family that could trace its lineage back 500 years. It is uncertain if her mother was her father's second wife, Marianna Guicciardini, known as Nanna, or the third, Francesca Pitti. Her brother Giovanni became a banker and diplomat.

Lucrezia was well-educated for a woman of her time. She was very capable in mathematics and finances, well-versed in literature, rhetoric, and theology, and read many texts in Latin and Greek besides her native Italian. Lucrezia may be represented in three scenes in Ghirlandaio's frescos in the Tornabuoni Chapel: The Visitation, The Birth of the Baptist, and The Nativity of Mary.

== Marriage ==
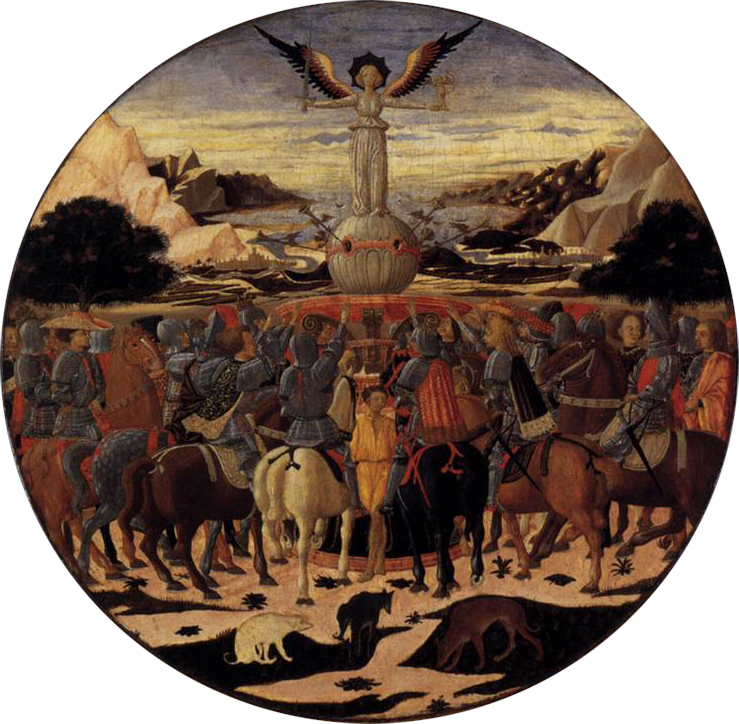
Triumph of Fame desco da parto by Giovanni di ser Giovanni Guidi was presented to Lucrezia upon the birth of her first son, Lorenzo de' Medici.

On 3 June 1444, Lucrezia married Piero di Cosimo de' Medici, son of Cosimo de' Medici, a wealthy banker and statesman from Florence. Her father was a friend and supporter of Cosimo, even through the latter's exile in 1434. The marriage and her dowry of 1200 florins helped to seal the alliance between their families. Lucrezia and Piero developed a good relationship and frequently wrote to each other while they were apart, expressing tenderness and concern. She also became a good friend of her brother-in-law Giovanni.

Lucrezia and Piero ensured that their children acquired good taste in literary culture and the fine arts. They hired tutors to educate them in such subjects as politics, business, accounting, and philosophy. Gentile de' Becchi and Cristoforo Landino were among the teachers. The couple eventually had at least seven children, though two sons didn't survive to adulthood:

- Bianca (1445–1505). Married Guglielmo Pazzi.
- Lucrezia (1448–1493). Known as Nannina. Married Bernardo Rucellai.
- Lorenzo (1449–1492). Succeeded his father as Lord of Florence. Married Clarice Orsini.
- Giuliano (1453–1478). Became father of Pope Clement VII. Killed in 1478 as a result of the Pazzi conspiracy against the Medici.
- Maria (1455 - 1479). Married Leonetto Rossi and had a son, the Cardinal Luigi de' Rossi.
- Two sons who died as newborn.

== Political importance ==
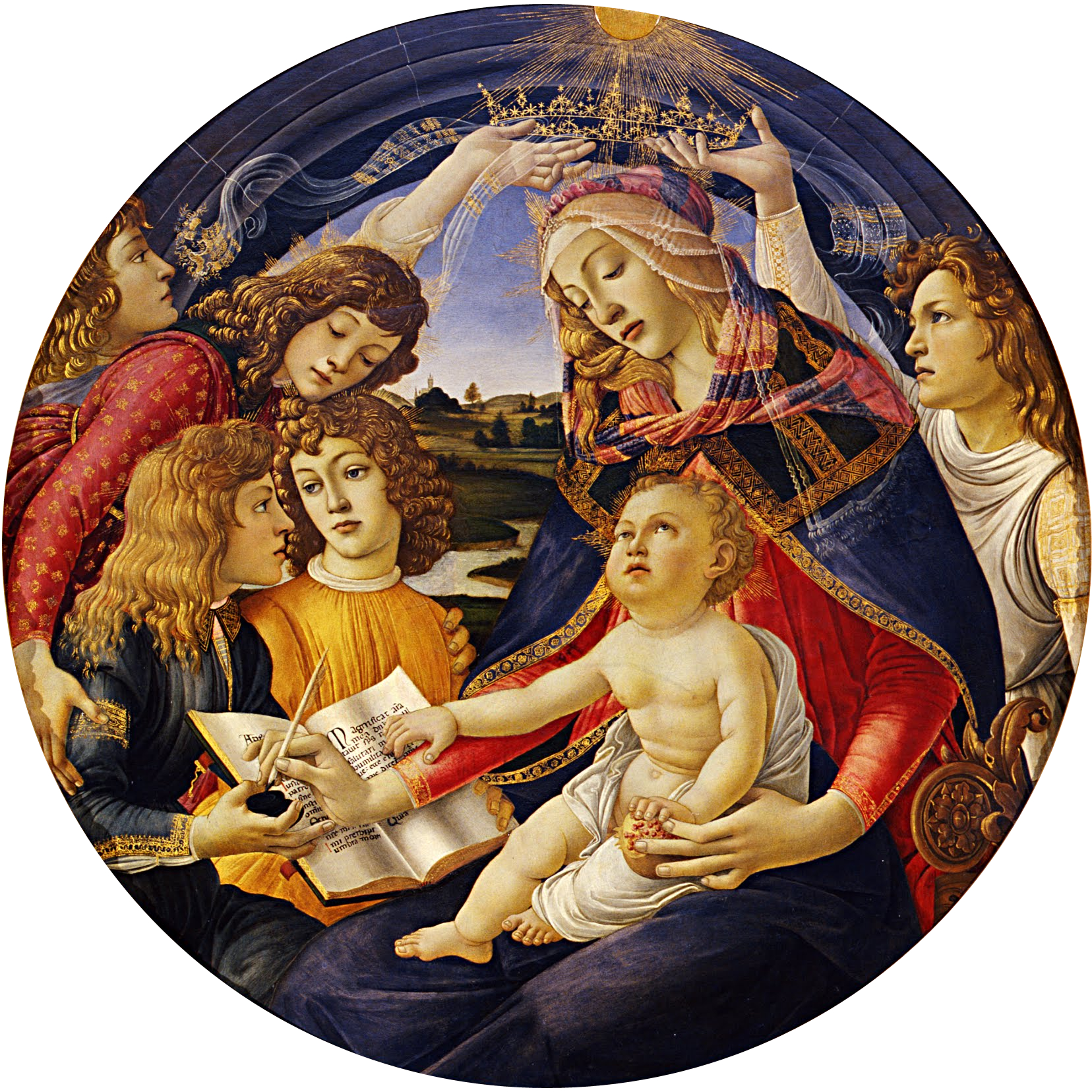
Madonna of the Magnificat may show Lucrezia Tornabuoni as the Madonna surrounded by her children, who hold a book and pot of ink.

Lucrezia was notably wise and astute in political matters. Her father-in-law, the first Medici de facto ruler of Florence, admired her skills in deciding issues. After Piero took over the government in 1464, his gout kept him confined to bed and thus transformed the couple's bedroom into something resembling a noble court. Thus, Lucrezia was more free to move and was asked by others to bear their requests to her husband. For a woman to travel alone and meet with the Pope and other influential officials was unusual and it was commented upon by contemporaries. Her advice was sought by many high and low-born people, who she received. After her husband's death in 1469, Lucrezia gained additional political influence as an advisor to their son. At her death, Lorenzo freely admitted that she had been one of his most important advisors.

=== Economy ===
As a noblewoman, Lucrezia possessed more freedom to own property and conduct business. She bought houses, shops, and farms in and around Pisa and Florence. Her shops would be leased to different businesses and thereby extended her patronage network. In 1477, she took a lease on a public bath facility near Volterra, which she renovated into a profitable venture. Her investments in communities around Florence helped spread the Medici's influence network.

Lucrezia became well known for giving solid donations to religious convents in order to help widows and orphans. She used her own income to provide dowries for women from poor families so that they could marry. This assistance was often provided by helping a family member to get a good position in the church or government.

=== Diplomacy ===
Lucrezia received many requests from citizens, which included appeals to end the exile or imprisonment of petitioners and to stop attacks by soldiers. She was called upon to mediate disputes among others in the area, once ending a feud between two families that had gone on for twenty years. Despite many Florentine problems having been resolved, conflict with the Medici continued. In October 1467, as part of a rivalry between Piero and Luca Pitti, there was an assassination attempt against Lucrezia and her son Giuliano. Though the two survived, Giuliano was killed in 1478 as a result of the Pazzi conspiracy against the Medici.

Since she was of noble birth, Lucrezia created bridges between her husband's family and the nobility. In 1450, she and her husband visited Rome for an audience with Pope Nicholas V, who gave them permission to build an altar in their family chapel. The couple wanted to increase their influence outside of Florence, especially in the Roman courts. In spring 1467, she visited the Pope again while seeking women suitable to marry her son Lorenzo. To improve the family's social status, Lucrezia arranged for her son to marry Clarice Orsini in June 1469. Clarice’s dowry was 6,000 florins, but Lorenzo wasn't very fond of his wife.

== Cultural influence ==
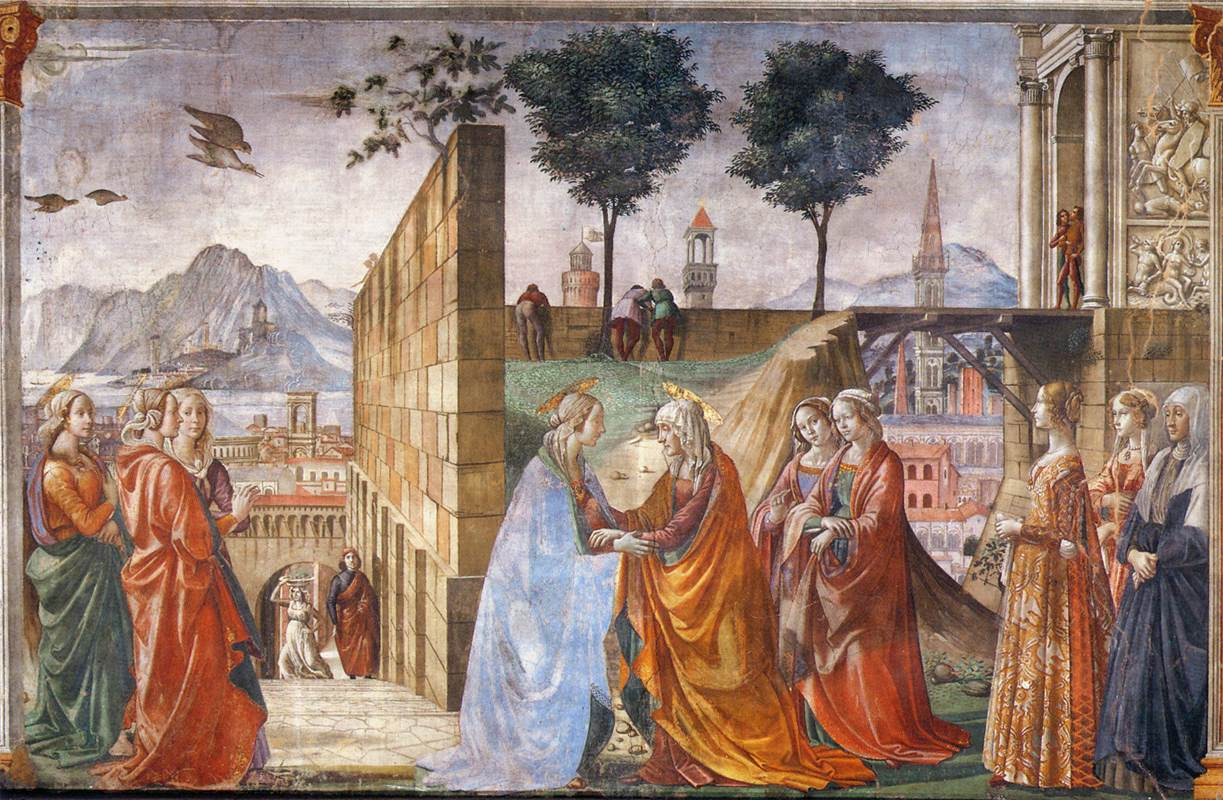
The Visitation in the Tornabuoni Chapel by Domenico Ghirlandaio, the woman at far right is thought to be Lucrezia Around 1475, her brother Giovanni commissioned the portrait, which is now in the National Gallery of Art in Washington, D.C.

=== Patronage ===
Lucrezia was a significant patron of the arts. She commissioned the Morgante by Luigi Pulci, who called her "a famous lady in our century", and supported many poets, including Bernardo Bellincioni and Angelo Poliziano, who later became a tutor to her grandchildren by Lorenzo. Similarly, religious institutions relied on Lucrezia's patronage. She was responsible for the addition of the Chapel of the Visitation in the Basilica of San Lorenzo in Florence and noted for donating many votive statues of her family to numerous churches. She was known to be devoted to John the Baptist, patron saint of Florence. After she became ill in 1467, she believed her recovery was due to the intercession of Saint Romuald and supported the hermitage that he had founded at Camaldoli from then on.

Recent scholarship has given more attention to Lucrezia's role as an active patron of the arts. Art historian Stefanie Solum argues that Lucrezia was involved in a collaborative commission with the illuminator Francesco d'Antonio del Chierico. Solum's research suggests that Lucrezia had a greater influence on the visual arts of fifteenth century Florence than has traditionally been recognized.

=== Author ===
Lucrezia wrote religious stories, plays, and poetry. She wrote stories about Esther, Susanna, Tobias, John the Baptist, and Judith. She recommended poets in her circle to use chivalric themes, which some of them did. In part, her works were written to inspire and educate her grandchildren. She read some of her poems to famous poets, comparing their compositions and exchanging humorous poems with Bellincioni. Poliziano admired her poetry and would read her poems to his students. Lucrezia's poetry was printed and published four years after she died. Some of her poems were set to popular tunes and performed publicly.

== Death ==
Lucrezia Tornabuoni suffered from arthritis and eczema, conditions which caused her to seek treatments at baths around Tuscany. After suffering from lifelong illness, Lucrezia died in Florence on 25 March 1482 at the age of 54. By the time of her death, she had many grandchildren.

== Fictional depictions ==
A young Lucrezia Tornabuoni is portrayed by Valentina Bellè in the 2016 television series, Medici: Masters of Florence. An older Lucrezia Tornabuoni was portrayed by Sarah Parish in the second and third seasons. The series chooses to show her still living in 1485, seven years after the Pazzi Conspiracy and also running the Medici bank in her son's stead, rather than her own business dealings.

== Sources ==
- Tomas, Natalie R. (2003). The Medici Women: Gender and Power in Renaissance Florence. Aldershot: Ashgate. ISBN 0754607771.
- Pernis, Maria Grazia; Adams, Laurie (2006). Lucrezia Tornabuoni De' Medici and the Medici Family in the Fifteenth Century. New York: Peter Lang Publishing, Inc. ISBN 978-0820476452.
- Robin, Diana Maury; Larsen, Anne R.; Levin, Carole (2007). Encyclopedia of women in the Renaissance: Italy, France, and England. ABC-CLIO, Inc.
- Neil D. Thompson and Charles M. Hansen, "A Medieval Heritage: The Ancestry of Charles II, King of England", The Genealogist, at 22 (2008):105-06
- Milligan, Gerry (2011). "Lucrezia Tornabuoni". Oxford Bibliographies.
