= Giovanni Tornabuoni =

Italian merchant, banker and patron of the arts

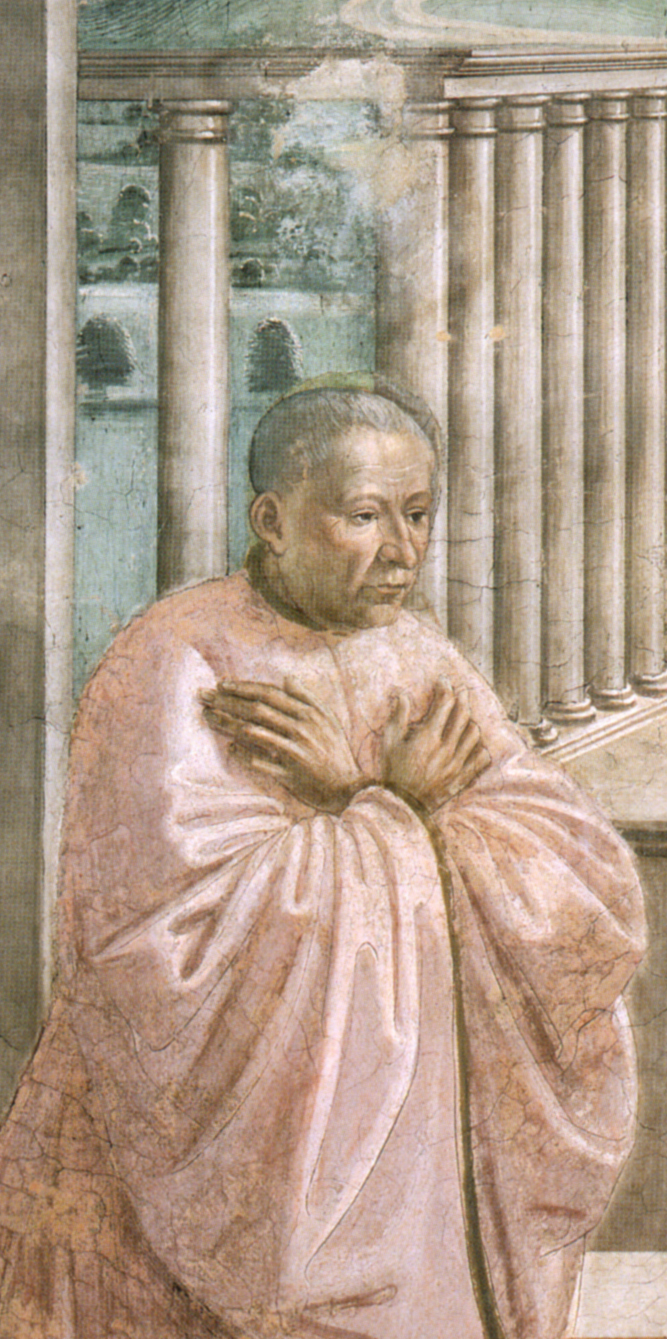
- Donor portrait of Giovanni Tornabuoni in the Tornabuoni Chapel, by Domenico Ghirlandaio.

Director of the branch in Rome
- Incumbent
- Assumed office 1443
- Preceded by: Leonardo Vernacci
- Succeeded by: Francesco Sassetti

Ambassador in the Papal court
- In office 1480–1484

Gonfaloniere di Giustizia
- In office 1482–1482

Personal details
- Born: 1428 Republic of Florence, Italy
- Died: 1497 (aged 69)
- Relatives: Lucrezia Tornabuoni; Lorenzo il Magnifico
- Occupation: Merchant, banker and patron of art

Giovanni Tornabuoni (Republic of Florence, Italy; 22 December 1428—17 April 1497) was an Italian merchant, banker and patron of the arts from Florence.

== Biography ==
Giovanni's father Francesco Tornabuoni was a successful entrepreneur and in 1427 the sixth largest taxpayer in Florence. His taxable wealth was considerable, 46,320 florins. He had three wives and eight children, of whom the two youngest, Lucrezia and Giovanni Tornabuoni, were the most famous. Lucrezia became famous above all because she married Piero de' Medici in 1444 and became the mother of Lorenzo de' Medici, de facto ruler of Florence in its Renaissance golden age, in 1449. Giovanni Tornabuoni is therefore the uncle of Lorenzo de' Medici.

He had strong connections with the House of Medici, being the brother of Lucrezia Tornabuoni, and therefore Lorenzo il Magnifico's uncle. In 1443 was named director of the branch in Rome, being Leonardo Vernacci the predecessor, as treasurer of Pope Sixtus IV.

Around 1475, Giovanni Tornabuoni commissioned a portrait of his sister by Domenico Ghirlandaio, which is now in the National Gallery of Art in Washington, D.C.

He was also Florentine ambassador in the Papal court in 1480 and 1484, and gonfaloniere di Giustizia in 1482. In 1485 he signed a contract with painter Domenico Ghirlandaio for a grand cycle of frescoes in what was to become the Tornabuoni Chapel in the church of Santa Maria Novella in Florence. Tornabuoni and his wife, Francesca Pitti, are portrayed as donors in the choir wall. He had been already portrayed by Ghirlandaio in the Sistine Chapel in the Vocation of Andrew and Paul.

Giovanni and Lorenzo were probably commissioned for the wedding in 1486 of Giovanni's son Lorenzo to Giovanna of the Albizzi family, and are therefore thought to depict the two on A Young Man Being Introduced to the Seven Liberal Arts.

By 1490, when the large Tornabuoni Chapel fresco cycle by Domenico Ghirlandaio was completed, family members and political allies of the Tornabuoni populate several scenes in considerable numbers, in addition to conventional kneeling portraits of Giovanni Tornabuoni and his wife.

With Lorenzo's death on 8 April 1492, the succession passed to his 20-year-old son Piero di Lorenzo de' Medici (1472–1521). Piero had no talent for running the bank and depended on his secretary and his great-uncle Giovanni Tornabuoni to handle everything. The two mismanaged the bank and balked the new ministro's, Giovambattista Bracci, efforts.

In 1494 Tornabuoni succeeded Francesco Sassetti in the direction of the Medici Bank.

File:Sandro Botticelli 028.jpg File:Vénus et les trois Grâces offrant des présents à une jeune fille - Sandro Botticelli - Musée du Louvre Peintures RF 321.jpg

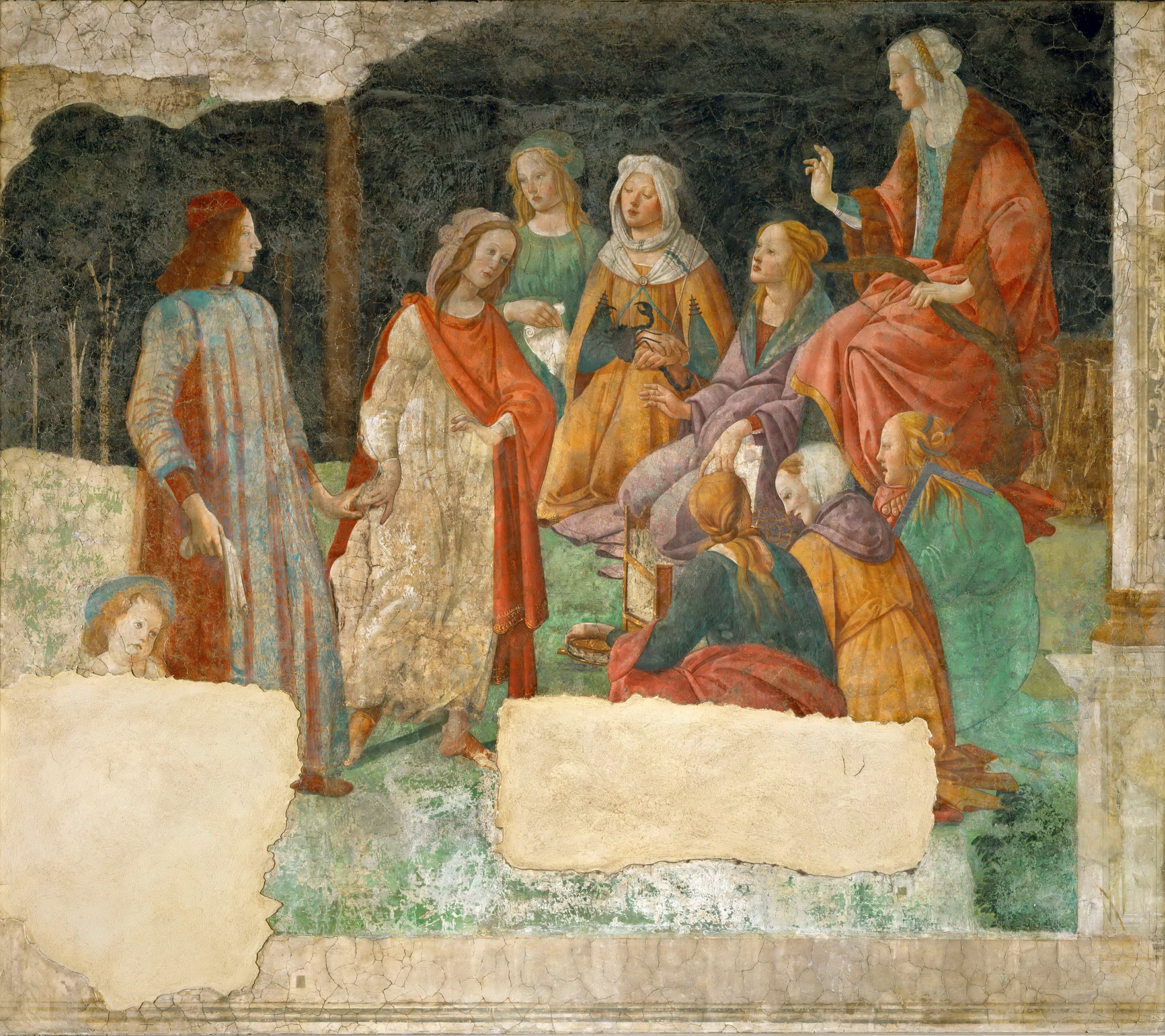
A Young Man Being Introduced to the Seven Liberal Arts [Lorenzo Tornabuoni, led by a personification of Grammar into a circle of allegorical figures representing the Seven Liberal Arts. Presided over by Prudentia, the circle also includes Rhetoric, Logic, Arithmetic, Geometry, Astronomy and Music,]

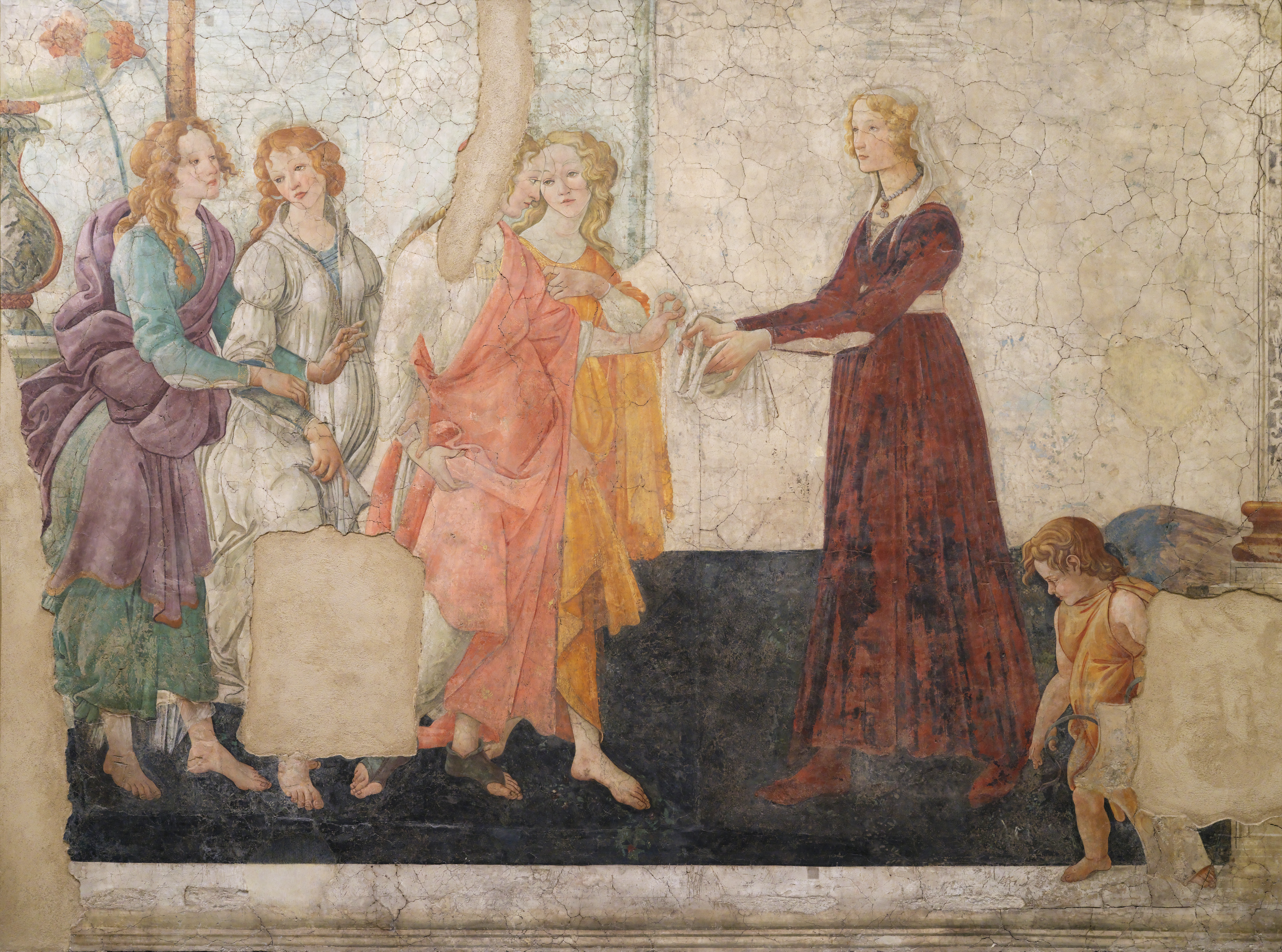
Venus and the Three Graces Presenting Gifts to a Young Woman [Giovanna degli Albizzi]

== Popular culture ==
He is mentioned in the video game Assassin's Creed II as a tutor of protagonist Ezio Auditore.
