= List of works by Bronzino =

This incomplete list of works by Bronzino contains paintings and drawings in a variety of genres. Titles and dates often vary by source.

== List of works by year ==
Image	Title	Date	Dimensions	Collection	Medium
	Pietà	1529	105 x 100 cm	Uffizi, Florence	Oil on panel
	Flaying of Marsyas	c. 1531–1532	48 × 119 cm	Hermitage Museum, Saint Peterburg	Oil on canvas
	Portrait of a Lady in Green	1530–1532	76.6 x 66.2 cm	Royal Collection, Windsor Castle	Oil on poplar panel
	Portrait of a Young Man as Saint Sebastian	c. 1533	87 x 76.5 cm	Thyssen-Bornemisza Museum, Madrid	Oil on panel
	Portrait of Ugolino Martelli	1536–1537	102 × 85 cm	Gemäldegalerie, Berlin	Oil on poplar panel
	Portrait of a Young Man with a Book	1530s	95.6 cm × 74.9 cm	Metropolitan Museum of Art, New York City	Oil on wood
	Portrait of a Man Holding a Statuette	c. 1525–1575	99 x 79 cm	Louvre, Paris	Oil on wood transferred to canvas
	Adoration of the Shepherds	1539–1540	65.3 x 46.7 cm	Museum of Fine Arts, Budapest	Oil on poplar panel
	Panciatichi Holy Family	1541	117 x 93 cm	Uffizi, Florence	Oil on panel
	Head of a Smiling Young Woman	c. 1542–1543	28.8 x 21.6 cm	Louvre, Paris	Charcoal and black chalk, with stumping, highlighted with white chalk
	Crossing of the Red Sea	1542	320 x 490 cm	Palazzo Vecchio, Florence	Fresco
	Adoration of the Bronze Snake	1540–1545	380 x 300 cm	Palazzo Vecchio, Florence	Fresco
	Deposition of Christ	1545	268 × 173 cm	Musée des Beaux-Arts, Besançon	Oil on panel
	Portrait of Andrea Doria as Neptune	c. 1530s–1540s	199.5 × 149 cm	Pinacoteca di Brera, Milan	Oil on canvas
	Portrait of Bartolomeo Panciatichi	c. 1540	104 × 85 cm	Uffizi, Florence	Oil on panel
	Portrait of Lucrezia Panciatichi	c. 1540–1545	101 x 82.8 cm	Uffizi, Florence	Oil on panel
	Portrait of Eleonora of Toledo	c. 1543	59 x 46 cm	National Gallery Prague	Oil on panel
	Portrait of Bia de' Medici	c. 1542	63.3 x 48 cm	Uffizi, Florence	Oil on panel
	Portrait of Giovanni de' Medici as a Child	1545	58 × 48 cm	Uffizi, Florence	Tempera on panel
	Portrait of Eleanor of Toledo and her son Giovanni de' Medici	c. 1545	115 x 96 cm	Detroit Institute of Arts	Oil on panel
	Portrait of Cosimo I de' Medici	1543–1545	74 x 58 cm	Uffizi, Florence	Oil on panel
	Portrait of Cosimo I de' Medici	c. 1545	76 x 59 cm	National Museum, Poznań	Oil on panel
	Portrait of Cosimo I de' Medici	c. 1545	86 x 66.8 cm	Art Gallery of New South Wales, Sydney	Oil on poplar panel
	Portrait of Cosimo I de' Medici (Note: Besides these four, several other versions of this portrait are attributed today to the workshop or followers of Bronzino)	c. 1545	76.5 x 59 cm	Thyssen-Bornemisza Museum, Madrid	Oil on panel
	Portrait of Stefano Colonna	c. 1546	125 x 95 cm	Galleria Nazionale d'Arte Antica, Rome	Tempera on wood
	Holy Family with Saint Anne and the Infant Saint John	c. 1545–1546	126.8 x 101.5 cm	Kunsthistorisches Museum, Vienna	Oil on wood
	Holy Family with Saint Elizabeth and the Infant Saint John the Baptist	c. 1525–1550	133 x 101 cm	Louvre, Paris	Oil on panel
	Venus, Cupid, Folly and Time	c. 1545	146.1 × 116.2 cm	National Gallery, London	Oil on wood
	Venus, Cupid and Jealousy	1548–1550	192 x 142 cm	Museum of Fine Arts, Budapest	Oil on poplar
	Portrait of a Young Man	c. 1550–1555	75 x 57.5 cm	National Gallery, London	Oil on panel
	Portrait of Lodovico Capponi	c. 1550–1555	117 x 86 cm	Frick Collection, New York City	Oil on panel
	Portrait of Don Garcia de' Medici	c. 1550	38 x 48 cm	Museo del Prado, Madrid	Oil on panel
	Portrait of Don Garcia de' Medici	1555–1565	15 x 12 cm	Uffizi, Florence	Oil on tin
	Portrait of the Dwarf Nano Morgante	1552		Palazzo Pitti, Florence	Oil on canvas
	Portrait of a Young Man	c. 1560		Gemäldegalerie, Berlin	Oil on poplar panel
	Allegory of Happiness	c. 1567	40 x 30 cm	Uffizi, Florence	Oil on copper

== See also ==
- Florentine painting
- Mannerism
