= Portrait of Giovanni de' Medici as a Child =

Painting by Bronzino

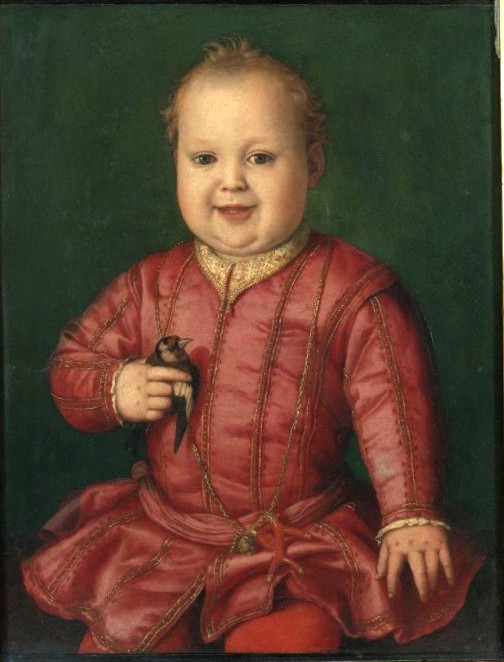
- Artist: Agnolo Bronzino
- Year: circa 1545
- Type: Oil on wood
- Dimensions: 58 cm × 48 cm (23 in × 19 in)
- Location: Galleria degli Uffizi, Florence

The Portrait of Giovanni de' Medici as a Child (c. 1545) is an oil on panel painting by the Florentine artist Agnolo Bronzino. It is currently located at the Galleria degli Uffizi in Florence.

== Background ==
This portrait uses oil paint on panel and portrays Giovanni di Cosimo de' Medici. It was painted for his father, Cosimo I de’ Medici, Grand Duke of Tuscany. Bronzino was the official painter of the Medici Court from 1532 and did many portraits of Duke Cosimo I and his family. Cosimo had his portrait done by Bronzino around 1545, the Portrait of Cosimo I de’ Medici. Giovanni and his mother Eleonora of Toledo were the subjects of another portrait by Bronzino from around 1545 or 1546, the Portrait of Eleonora of Toledo and Her Son.

== Description and Analysis ==
An extended title for this portrait is the Portrait of Giovanni de’ Medici as a Child holding a Goldfinch. It was painted sometime between 1544 and 1545, based on the child's age. Giovanni was born in the September 1543 and this portrait depicts him at the age of eighteen months. He is wearing a pink doublet, which is painted with high detail. He holds a goldfinch (Carduelis carduelis) in his hand, which is a Christian symbol, because the goldfinch eats thistle seed and so is associated with Christ’s Crown of Thorns and the Passion. It appears in religious paintings to represent the knowledge of the future Crucifixion. Around his neck, he wears a gold chain with a coral and other charms. It was believed that coral could protect children from harm.

Unlike Bronzino's other portraits that depict the sitters viewing the world with a distant, aristocratic disdain, Giovanni's portrait is animated and engaging. The portraits of Cosimo's other children are represented with the same emotionless faces as the adults. They do not show any of the children's personality and are very serious. Most of the portraits have the sitter with the body almost face-on, with a slight three-quarter turn of the head to the left. The sitter looks at the viewer and the dark backgrounds are unspecific. Giovanni's portrait is quite different. It depicts an almost 2-year-old child cheerfully and realistically, with an accurate description of the morphology of a young child. Unlike the portraits of the duke's other sons, it is cropped above the knee and the body is presented almost frontally with a slight turn to our left. The child is seated on dark-brown bench, with a dark green background that contrasts well with his pink clothes that are the same color as his coral charm. It is a natural depiction of early childhood with his chubby face and fingers. Two of his baby teeth are peeping out, and he has tufts of fine hair that all add to his delightful representation. His active expression is that of a young child as he smiles and gazes out at the viewer. Giovanni was the second son of Cosimo (and hence traditionally destined for the church), and was portrayed differently from his brothers because his father had different goals for his life. Years later, after Giovanni became a cardinal at the age of seventeen, he had Bronzino paint an allegorical portrait titled Portrait of Giovanni de’ Medici as St. John the Baptist, which was painted between 1560 and 1562.

It was said a month after he was born, he was “beautiful and plump” (bello e grasso) and “like an angel from paradise”. In 1547, he was described as “the handsomest and happiest boy that ever was…”
