= Portrait of Lucrezia Panciatichi =

Painting by Bronzino

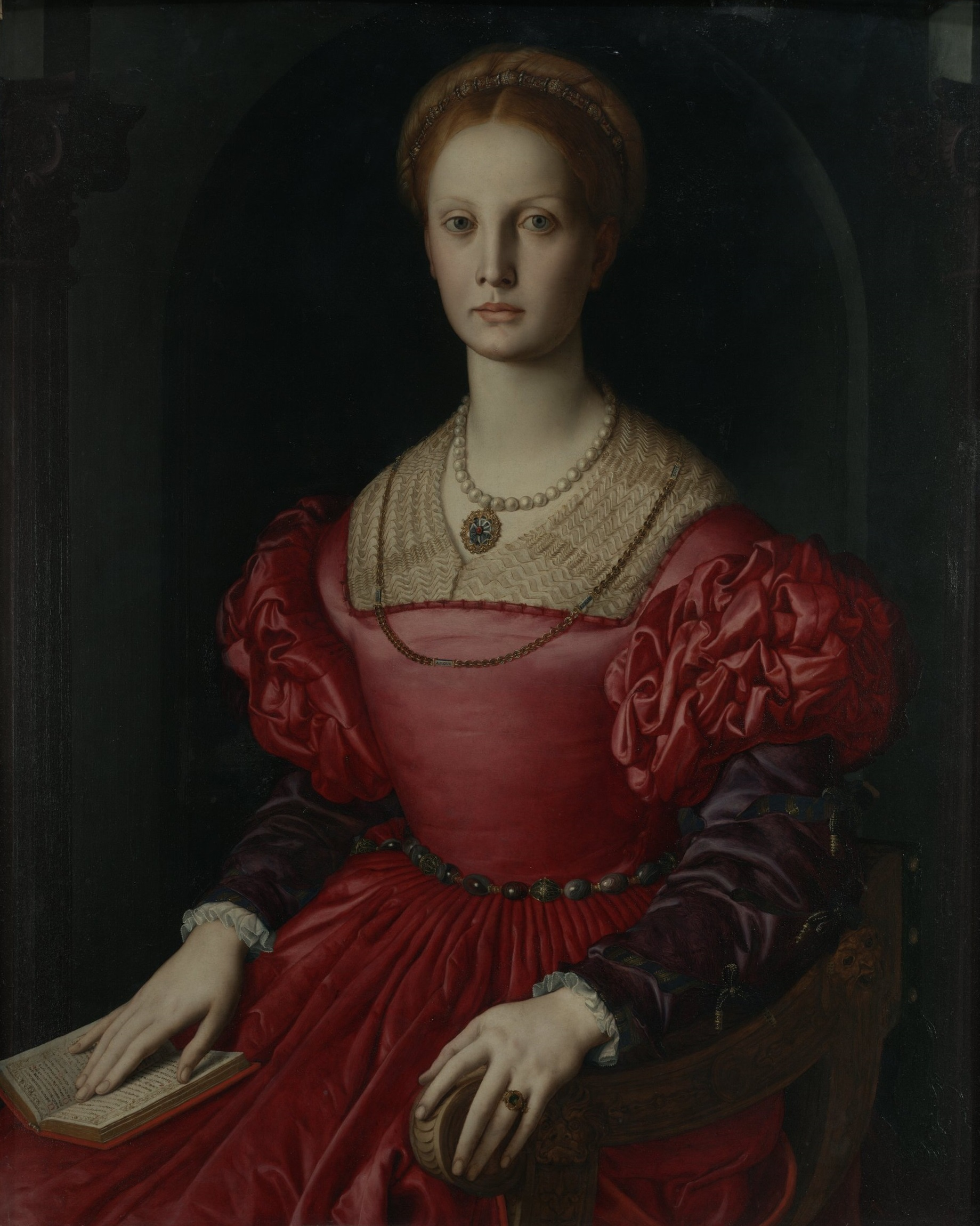
- Artist: Bronzino
- Year: c. 1545
- Medium: Oil on panel
- Dimensions: 102 cm × 85 cm (40 in × 33 in)
- Location: Uffizi; Florence

The Portrait of Lucrezia Panciatichi is an oil on panel painting by the Italian artist Agnolo di Cosimo, known as Bronzino, finished around 1545. It is a pendant to the portrait of her husband, Bartolomeo Panciatichi. Both paintings are in the Uffizi Gallery in Florence, Italy.

Lucrezia di Sigismondo Pucci was the wife of Bartolomeo Panciatichi, a Florentine humanist and politician. Giorgio Vasari describes the two portraits as: "so natural that they seem truly living". The refined garments and jewelry reflect her elite social position and aspects of her identity as a devoted wife. The words "Amour dure sans fin" ("love endures without end") appear on her golden necklace.

The portrait is mentioned and described in the novel The Wings of the Dove (1902) by Henry James. The portrait is also alluded in the Victorian ghost story “Amour Dure” by Vernon Lee. Further, this portrait has a central role in "The House of Stairs" (1988) by Ruth Rendell writing as Barbara Vine Kingsmarkham Enterprises ISBN 0-517-57252-4.

This portrait is often mistaken for that of Elizabeth Báthory.

== See also ==
- Portrait of Bartolomeo Panciatichi
