= Portrait of Ugolino Martelli =

Painting by Bronzino

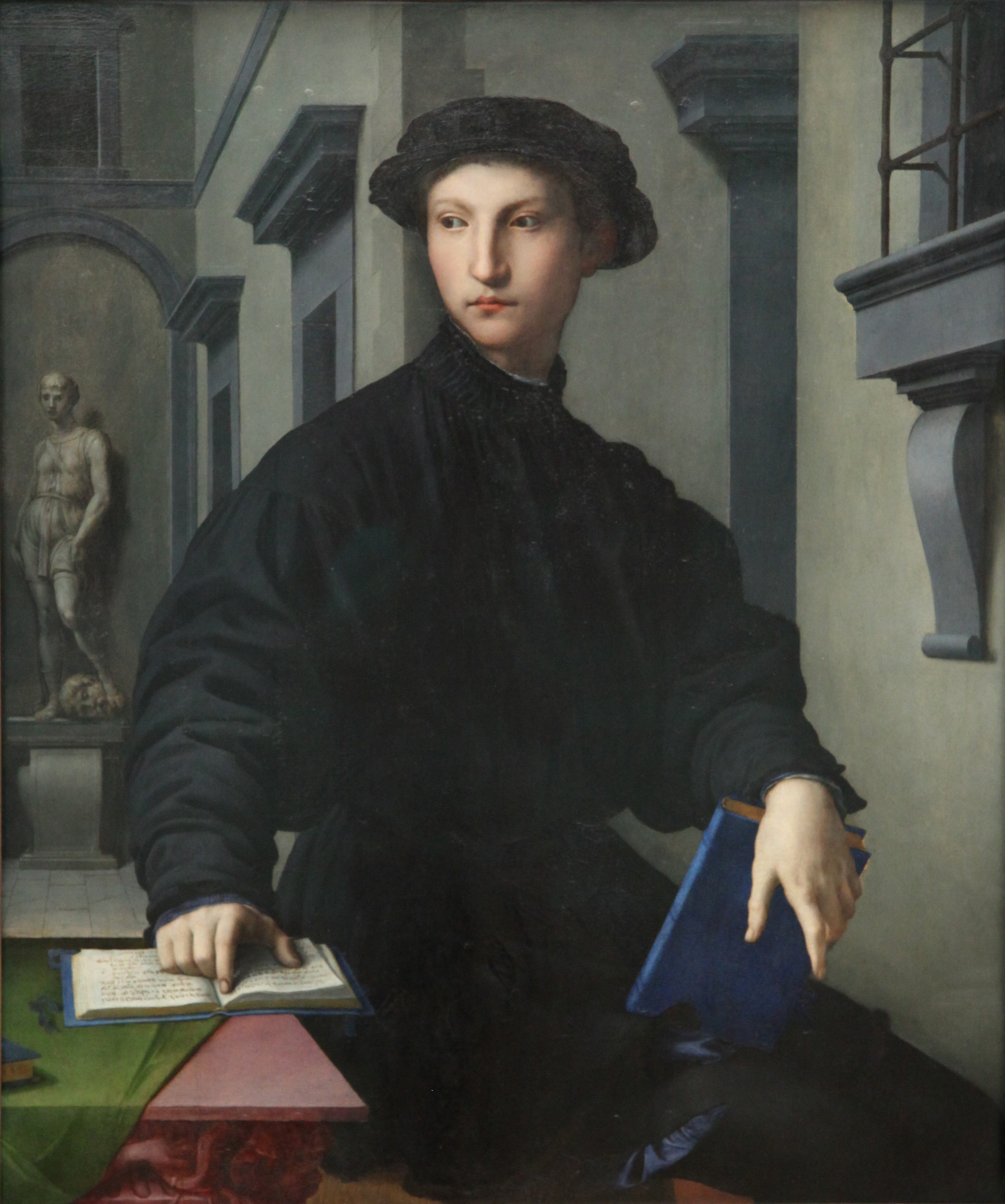
- Portrait of Ugolino Martelli
- Artist: Bronzino
- Year: 1536 or 1537
- Medium: Oil on a poplar panel
- Dimensions: 102 cm × 85 cm (40 in × 33 in)
- Location: Gemäldegalerie; Berlin
- Owner: Staatliche Museen zu Berlin
- Accession: 338A

The Portrait of Ugolino Martelli is a painting by the Italian artist Agnolo di Cosimo, known as Bronzino, executed in 1536 or 1537. It is now in the Gemäldegalerie, Berlin, Germany. The work is signed "BRONZO FIORENTINO" on the edge of the table top.

Ugolino Martelli (1519-1592) was a Florentine aristocrat, humanist, and linguist, whose family palazzo can be seen in the background of the picture. A marble David of the family's collection appears in the background. It was formerly attributed to Donatello, while it is now ascribed to Antonio or Bernardo Rossellino and dated between about 1461 to 1479. The earliest reference to the sculpture is in the private records of Luigi d'Ugolino Martelli, Ugolino's grandfather, in an inventory of his possessions begun in 1488. It is now in the National Gallery in Washington D.C. David was a traditional symbol of Florentine freedom, and could be an allusion to Martelli adherence to the city's Republican party.

On the scholar's desk a copy of Homer's Iliad, in Greek, can be seen turned towards the reader. It is open at the beginning of the ninth book, the "Embassy to Achilles". A second book, of which only a corner is visible, is inscribed "MARO", indicating the Latin poet Publius Vergilius Maro better known as Virgil. Ugolino's left arm is supported by a work by Pietro Bembo, whose sonnets were written in the vernacular. Ugolino lectured on Bembo and had met him by 1539.

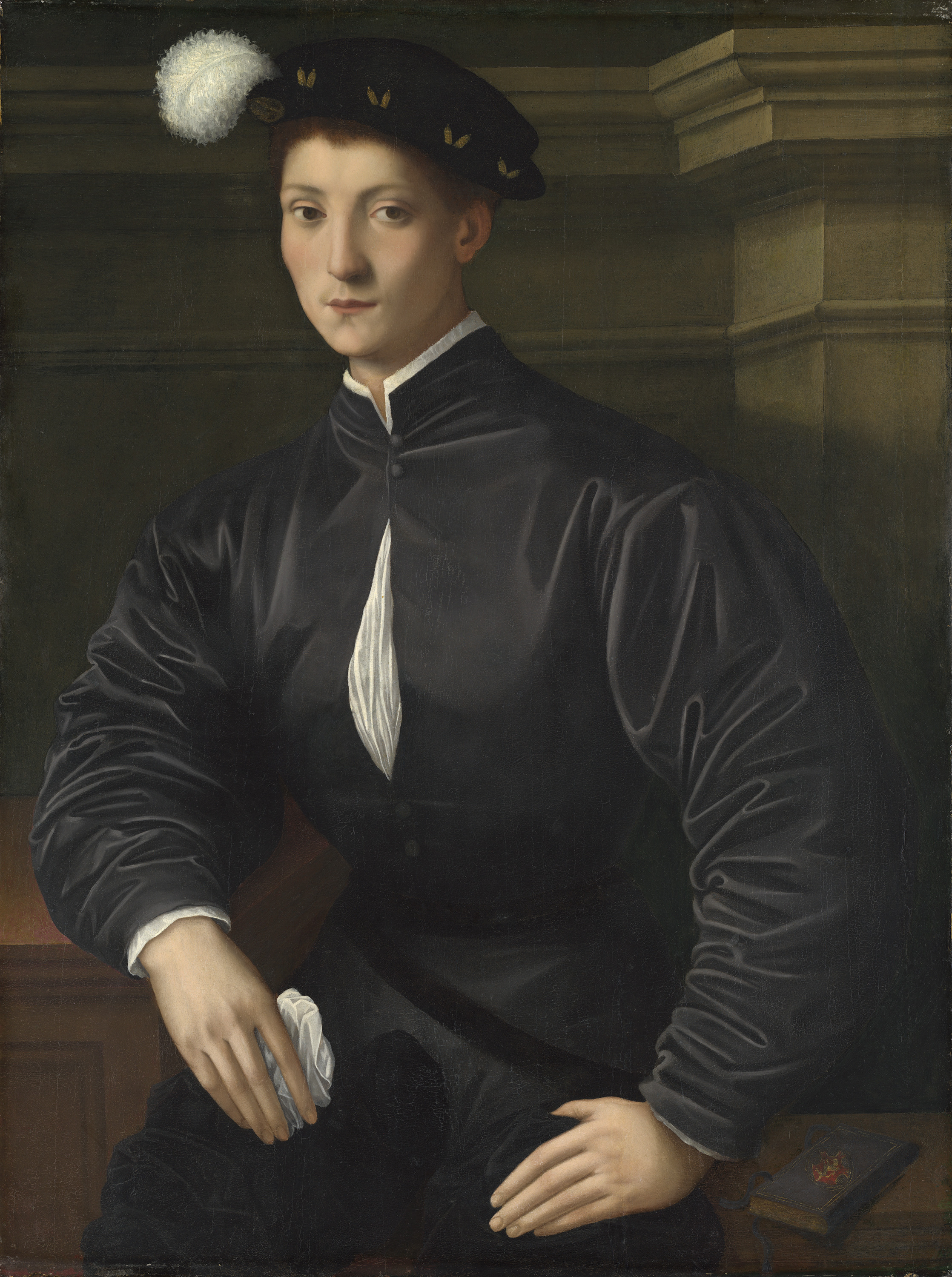
Portrait of Ugolino Martelli, oil on panel, 91.4 x 68 cm. National Gallery of Art

Another portrait of Ugolino Martelli is now in the National Gallery of Art in Washington D.C. It used to be attributed to Pontormo, but is now believed to be by a closely associated painter.
