= Allegory of Happiness =

Painting by Bronzino

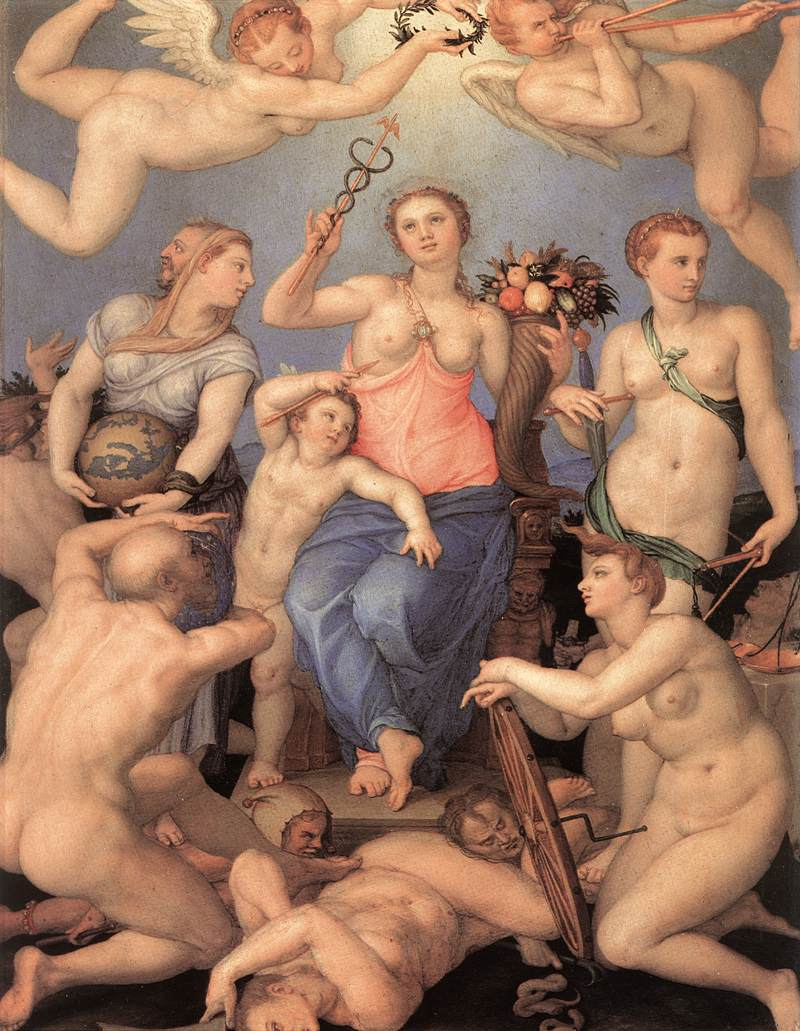
Allegory of Happiness (1567) by Bronzino

Allegory of Happiness is an oil-on-copper painting by the Italian Mannerist painter Bronzino, probably first produced for the Studiolo of Francesco I, signed BROZ. FAC. and now in the Uffizi in Florence. It is now in a fluted and gilded 17th-century wooden frame. Most art historians date it to around 1567, and it is first mentioned in the Uffizi inventory in 1635/8.

== Iconography ==
Happiness is represented as a young woman with a cornucopia and caduceus in the centre of the painting with Cupid as a girl, representing love. Prudence and Justice stand on either side of her, whilst the conquered enemies of peace and Fortune, with her wheel, lie at her feet. Graham Smith argues that this ideal state of happiness is Florence, and that it celebrates Cosimo I for the great public well-being of the time.
