= Portrait of Bartolomeo Panciatichi =

Painting by Bronzino

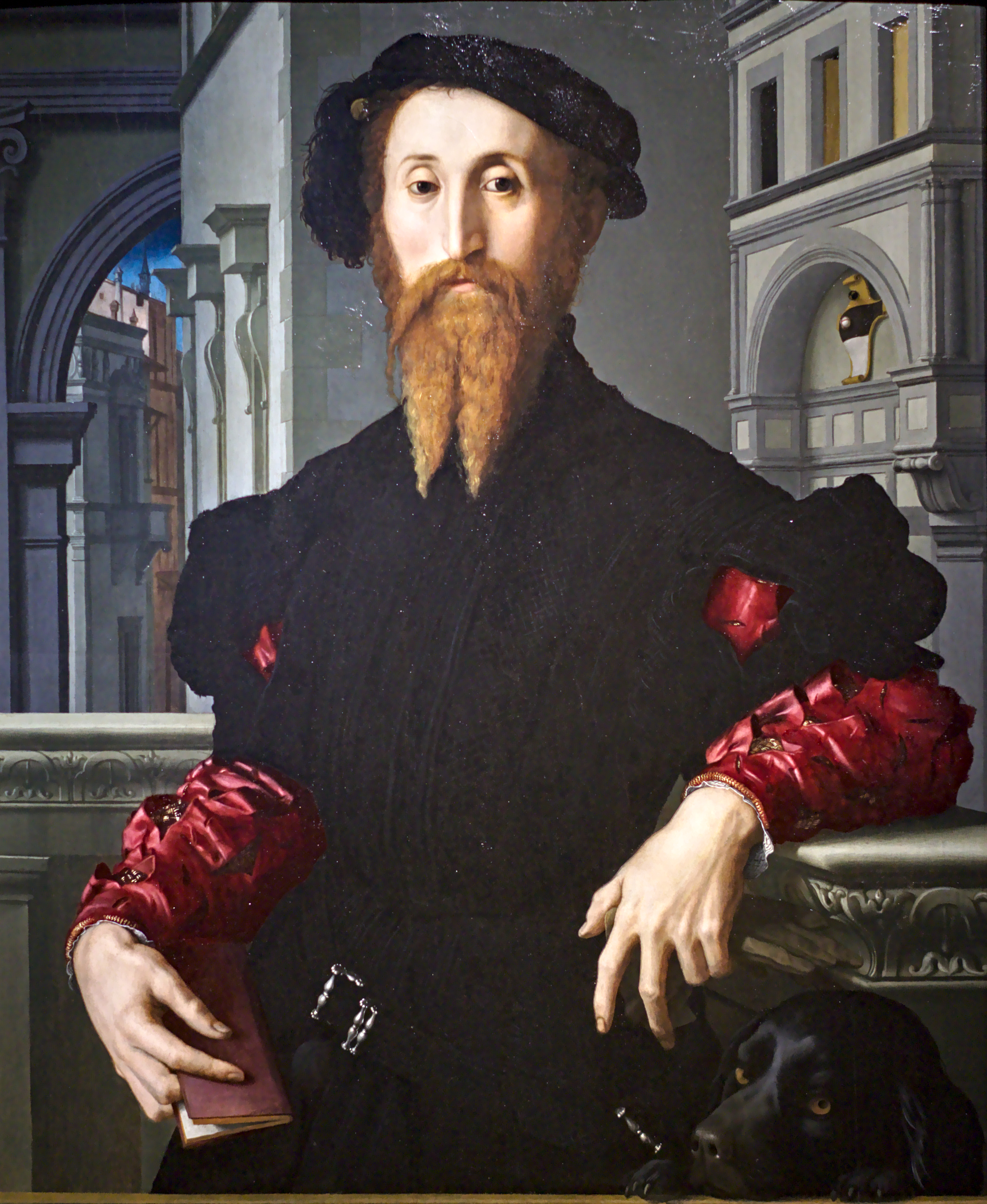
- Artist: Bronzino
- Year: c. 1540
- Medium: Tempera on panel
- Dimensions: 104 cm × 84 cm (41 in × 33 in)
- Location: Uffizi, Florence

The Portrait of Bartolomeo Panciatichi is a tempera on panel painting by the Italian artist Agnolo di Cosimo, known as Bronzino, finished around 1540. It is housed in the Uffizi Gallery of Florence, Italy since 1704.

Bartolomeo Panciatichi was a Florentine humanist and politician. His wife was also portrayed by Bronzino a few years later.

== See also ==
- Portraits by Bronzino
- Portrait of Lucrezia Panciatichi
