= Portrait of a Young Man as Saint Sebastian =

Painting by Bronzino

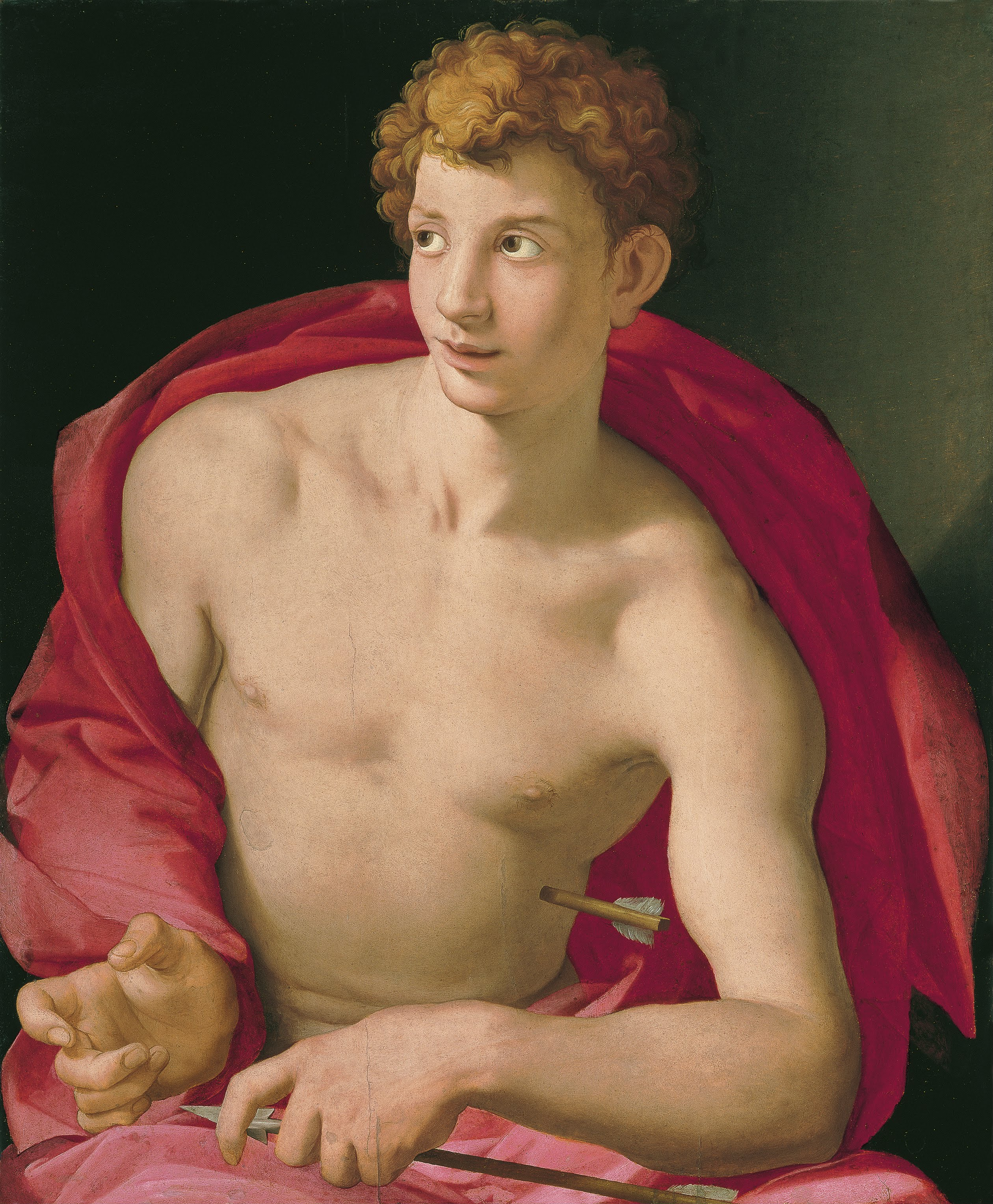
- Artist: Bronzino
- Year: c. 1533
- Type: Oil on panel
- Dimensions: 87 cm × 76.5 cm (34 in × 30.1 in)
- Location: Museo Thyssen-Bornemisza; Madrid

Portrait of a Young Man as Saint Sebastian is an oil painting on panel by the Italian artist Agnolo di Cosimo, known as Bronzino, from c. 1533. It is held in the Museo Thyssen-Bornemisza, in Madrid. It entered that museum's collection in 1984 from a private collection in Rieti.

The work has been related to the very similar figure of Saint Matthew from the four tondi in the Capponi Chapel, on which Bronzino collaborated with Pontormo, and to a study for it which is now in the Uffizi.
