= Pietà (Bronzino, 1529) =

Painting by Bronzino

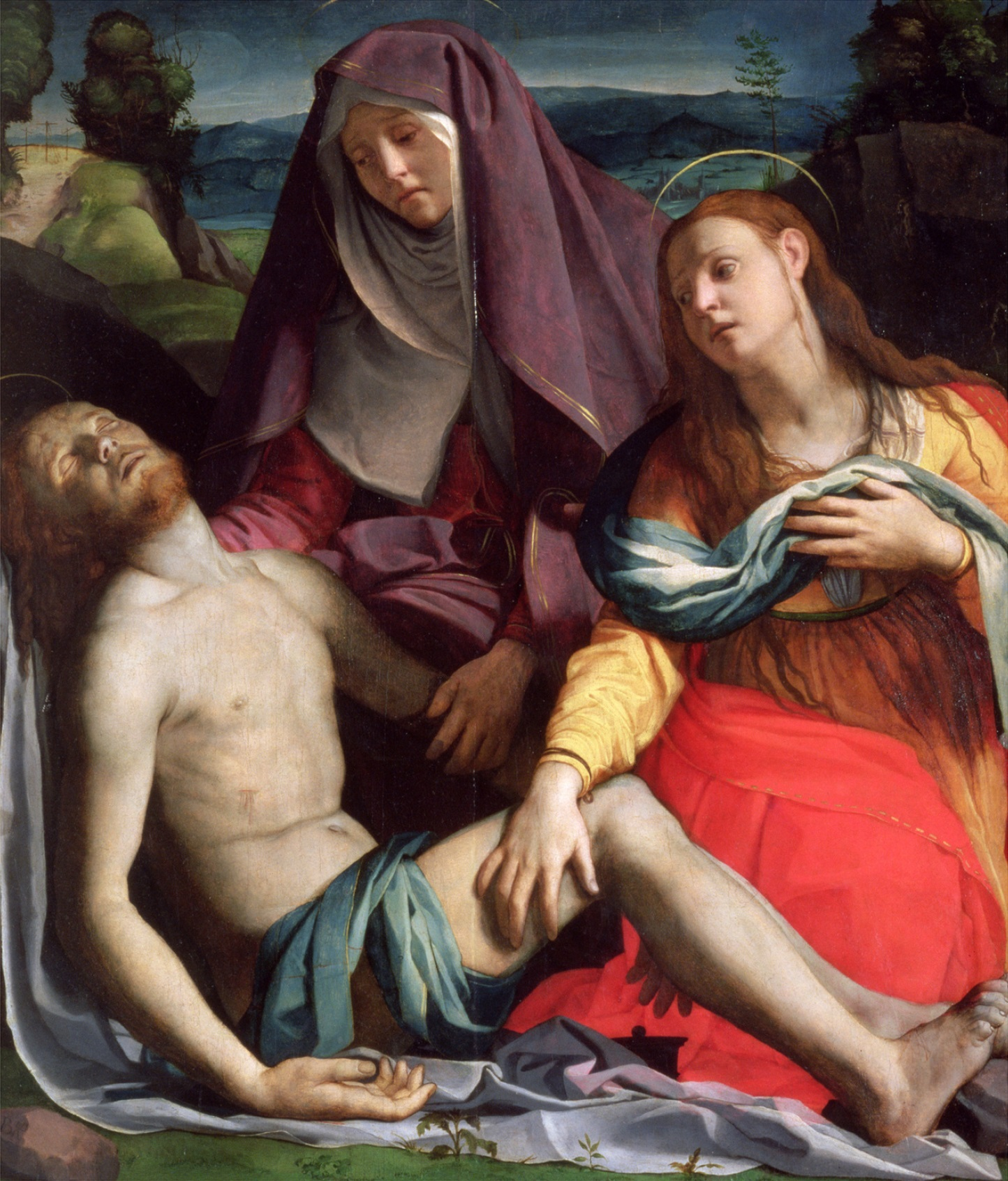
Pietà (1529) by Bronzino

Pietà or Pietà with Mary Magdalene is a 1529 painting by the Italian Mannerist painter Bronzino, produced early in his career and now in the Uffizi in Florence.
