= Bronzino =

Italian Mannerist painter (1503–1572)

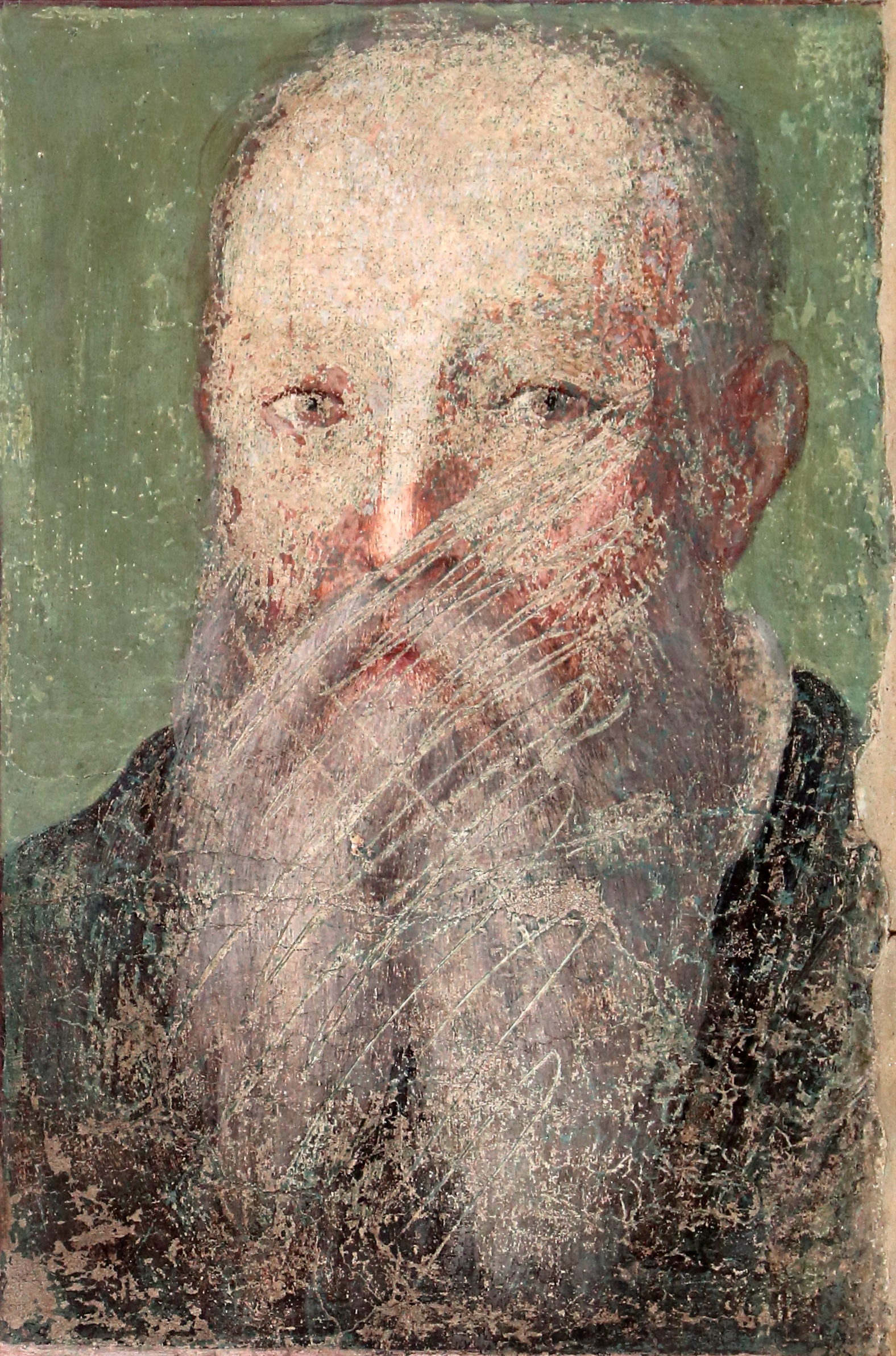
- Portrait of Bronzino by Alessandro Allori, c. 1567–71
- Born: Agnolo di Cosimo; 17 November 1503; Florence, Republic of Florence
- Died: 23 November 1572 (aged 69); Florence, Grand Duchy of Tuscany
- Known for: Painting
- Movement: Mannerism

Signature
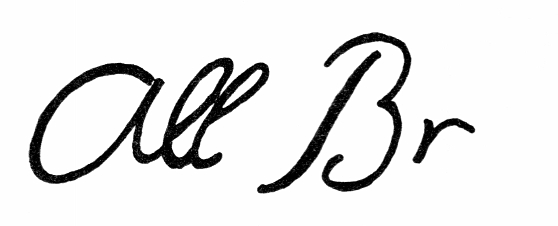

Agnolo di Cosimo (Italian: [ˈaɲɲolo di ˈkɔːzimo]; 17 November 1503 – 23 November 1572), usually known as Bronzino (Italian: Il Bronzino [il bronˈdziːno]) or Agnolo Bronzino, (Note: Mistaken attempts also have been made in the past to assert his name was Agnolo Tori and even Angelo (Agnolo) Allori.) was an Italian Mannerist painter from Florence. His sobriquet, Bronzino, may refer to his relatively dark skin or reddish hair.

He lived all his life in Florence, and from his late 30s was kept busy as the court painter of Cosimo I de' Medici, Grand Duke of Tuscany. He was mainly a portraitist, but also painted many religious subjects, and a few allegorical subjects, which include what is probably his best-known work, Venus, Cupid, Folly and Time, c. 1544–45, now in London. Many portraits of the Medicis exist in several versions with varying degrees of participation by Bronzino himself, as Cosimo was a pioneer of the copied portrait sent as a diplomatic gift.

He trained with Pontormo, the leading Florentine painter of the first generation of Mannerism, and his style was greatly influenced by him, but his elegant and somewhat elongated figures always appear calm and somewhat reserved, lacking the agitation and emotion of those by his teacher. They have often been found cold and artificial, and his reputation suffered from the general critical disfavour attached to Mannerism in the 19th and early 20th centuries. Recent decades have been more appreciative of his art.

== Life ==
Bronzino was born in Florence, the son of a butcher. According to his contemporary Vasari, Bronzino was a pupil first of Raffaellino del Garbo, and then of Pontormo, to whom he was apprenticed at 14. Pontormo is thought to have introduced a portrait of Bronzino as a child (seated on a step) into one of his series on Joseph in Egypt now in the National Gallery, London. Pontormo exercised a dominant influence on Bronzino's developing style, and the two were to remain collaborators for most of the former's life. An early example of Bronzino's hand has often been detected in the Capponi Chapel in the church of Santa Felicita by the Ponte Vecchio in Florence. Pontormo designed the interior and executed the altarpiece, the masterly Deposition from the Cross and the sidewall fresco Annunciation. Bronzino apparently was assigned the frescoes on the dome, which have not survived. Of the four empanelled tondi or roundels depicting each of the evangelists, two were said by Vasari to have been painted by Bronzino. His style is so similar to his master's that scholars still debate the specific attributions.

Towards the end of his life, Bronzino took a prominent part in the activities of the Florentine Accademia delle Arti del Disegno, of which he was a founding member in 1563.

The painter Alessandro Allori was his favourite pupil, and Bronzino was living in the Allori family house at the time of his death in Florence in 1572 (Alessandro was also the father of Cristofano Allori). Bronzino spent the greater part of his career in Florence.

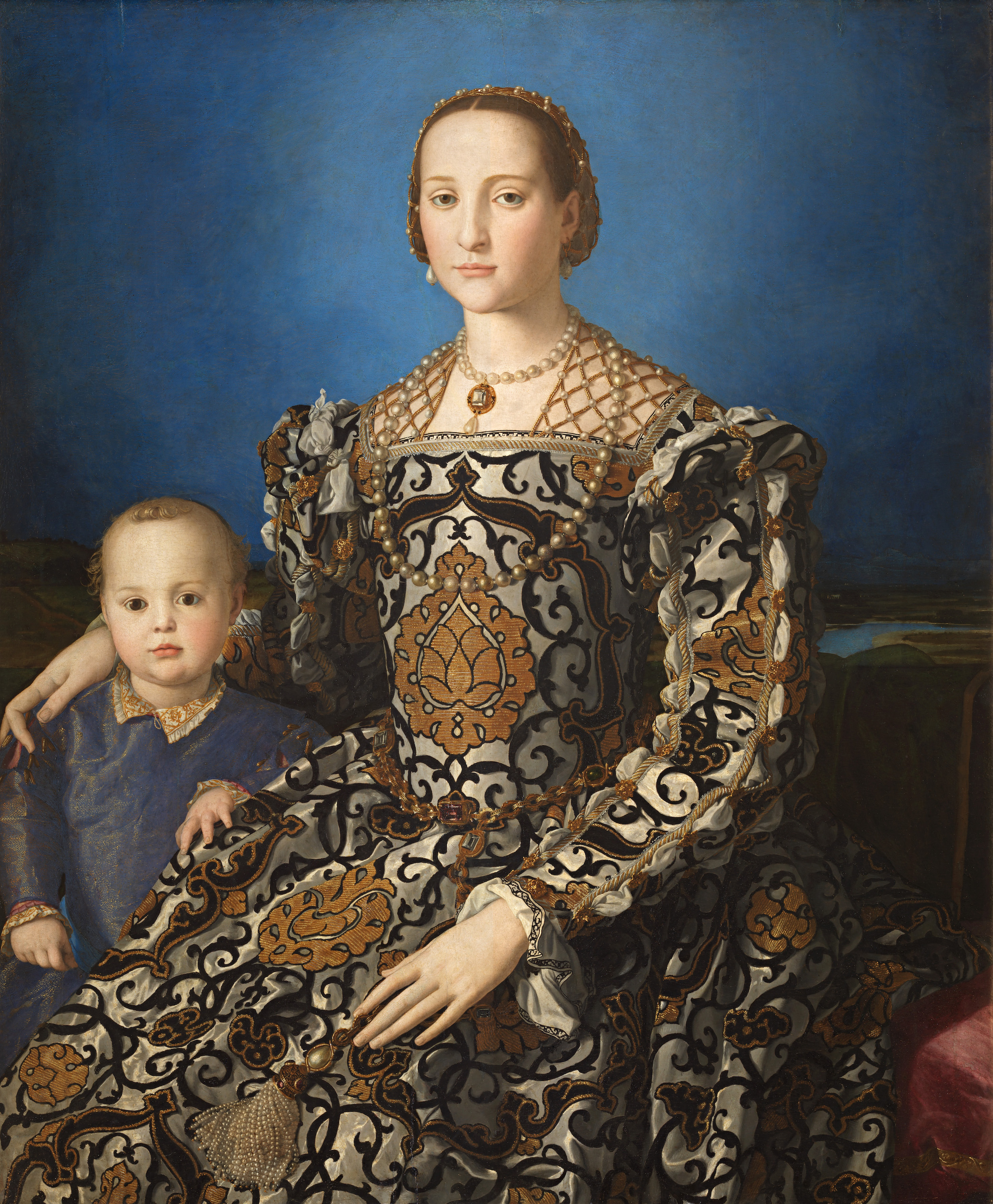
Portrait of Eleanor of Toledo with Her Son Giovanni, 1544–45, Uffizi Gallery, Florence

== Work ==
=== Portraits ===
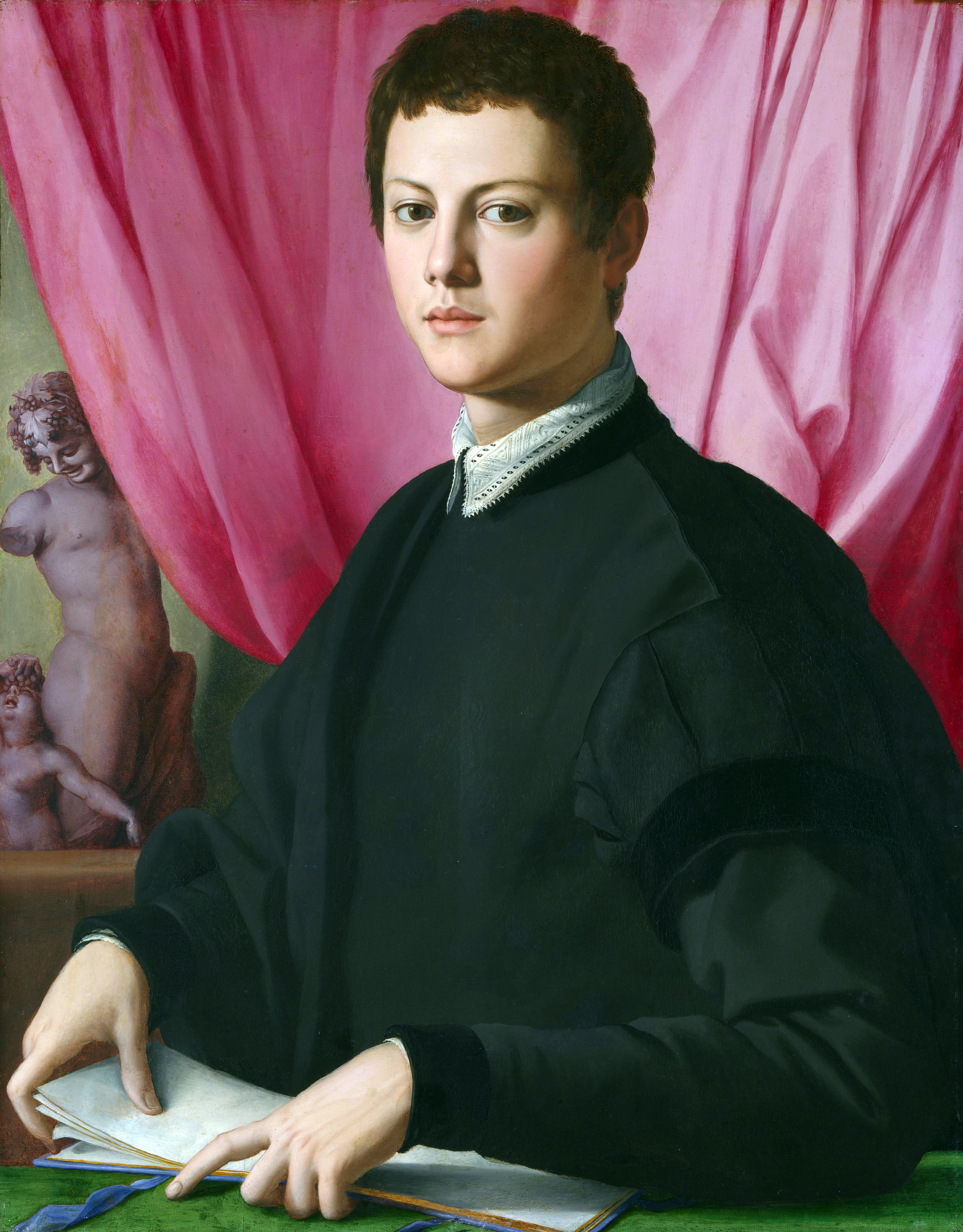
Portrait of a Young Man, c. 1550–55, National Gallery, London

Bronzino first received Medici patronage in 1539, when he was one of the many artists chosen to execute the elaborate decorations for the wedding of Cosimo I de' Medici to Eleonora di Toledo, daughter of the Viceroy of Naples. It was not long before he became, and remained for most of his career, the official court painter of the Duke and his court. His portrait figures – often read as static, elegant, and stylish exemplars of unemotional haughtiness and assurance – influenced the course of European court portraiture for a century. These well known paintings exist in many workshop versions and copies. In addition to images of the Florentine elite, Bronzino also painted idealized portraits of the poets Dante (c. 1530, now in Washington, D.C.) and Petrarch.

Bronzino's best-known works comprise the aforementioned series of the duke and duchess, Cosimo and Eleonora, and figures of their court such as Bartolomeo Panciatichi and his wife Lucrezia. These paintings, especially those of the duchess, are known for their minute attention to the detail of her costume, which almost takes on a personality of its own in the image at right. Here the Duchess is pictured with her second son Giovanni, who died of malaria in 1562, along with his mother; however it is the sumptuous fabric of the dress that takes up more space on the canvas than either of the sitters. Indeed, the dress itself has been the object of some scholarly debate. The elaborate gown has been rumoured to be so beloved by the duchess that she was ultimately buried in it; when this myth was debunked, others suggested that perhaps the garment never existed at all and Bronzino invented the entire thing, perhaps working only from a fabric swatch. In any case, this picture was reproduced over and over again by Bronzino and his shop, becoming one of the most iconic images of the duchess. The version pictured here is in the Uffizi Gallery, and is one of the finest surviving examples.

Bronzino's so-called "allegorical portraits", such as that of a Genoese admiral, Portrait of Andrea Doria as Neptune, are less typical but possibly even more fascinating owing to the peculiarity of placing a publicly recognized personality in the nude as a mythical figure. Finally, in addition to being a painter, Bronzino was also a poet, and his most personal portraits are perhaps those of other literary figures such as that of his friend the poet Laura Battiferri. The eroticized nature of these virile nude male portraits, as well as homoerotic references in his poetry, have led scholars to believe that Bronzino was homosexual.

=== Religious and allegorical subjects ===
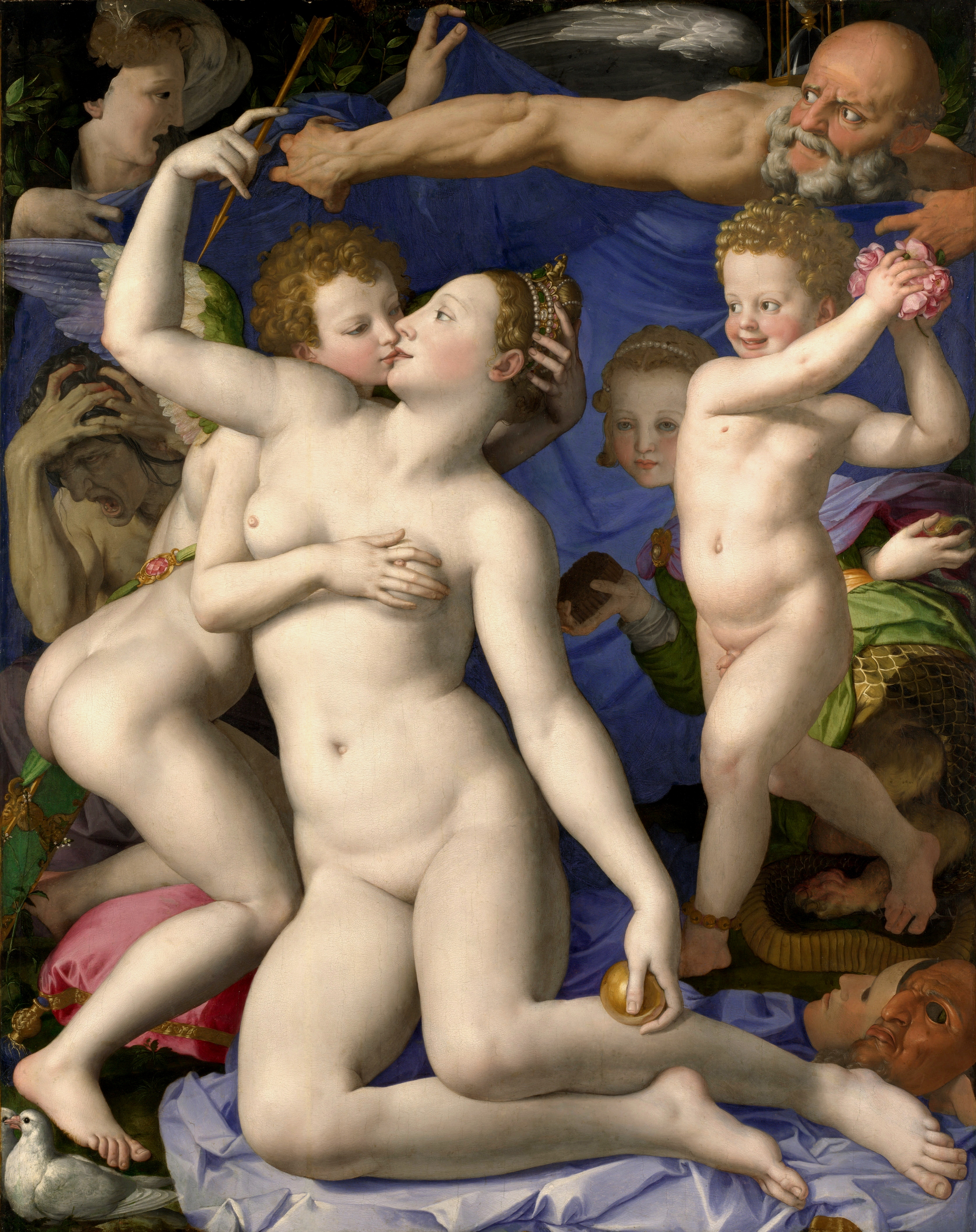
Venus, Cupid, Folly and Time, c. 1544–45, National Gallery, London

In 1540/41, Bronzino began work on the fresco decoration of the Chapel of Eleanora di Toledo in the Palazzo Vecchio and an oil on panel Deposition of Christ to be an altarpiece for the chapel. Before this commission, his style in the religious genre was less Mannerist, and was based in balanced compositions of the High Renaissance. Yet he became elegant and classicizing in this fresco cycle, and his religious works are examples of the mid-16th-century aesthetics of the Florentine court – traditionally interpreted as highly stylized and non-personal or emotive. Crossing the Red Sea is typical of Bronzino's approach at this time, though it should not be claimed that Bronzino or the court was lacking in religious fervour on the basis of the preferred court fashion. Indeed, the duchess Eleanora was a generous patron to the recently founded Jesuit order.

Bronzino's work tends to include sophisticated references to earlier painters, as in one of his last grand frescoes called The Martyrdom of St. Lawrence (San Lorenzo, 1569), in which almost every one of the extraordinarily contorted poses can be traced back to Raphael or to Michelangelo, whom Bronzino idolized. Bronzino's skill with the nude was even more enigmatically deployed in the celebrated Venus, Cupid, Folly and Time, which conveys strong feelings of eroticism under the pretext of a moralizing allegory. His other major works include the design of a series of tapestries on The Story of Joseph, for the Palazzo Vecchio.

Many of Bronzino's works are still in Florence but other examples can be found in the National Gallery, London, and elsewhere.

== Selected works ==
All works are paintings in oil on wood panel, unless noted otherwise.

=== Florence ===
==== Original sites ====
- Adoration of the Bronze Snake (1540–45) – Fresco, 320 × 385 cm, Palazzo Vecchio
- Crossing of the Red Sea (1541–42) – Fresco, 320 × 490 cm, Palazzo Vecchio
- Martyrdom of St. Lawrence (1569) – Fresco, San Lorenzo
- St. Mark and St. Matthew (c. 1525) – Santa Felicita, Capponi Chapel

==== Uffizi ====
- Pietà (c. 1530) – 105 × 100 cm
- Portrait of Bartolomeo Panciatichi (c. 1540) – Tempera on wood, 104 × 84 cm
- Holy Family (c. 1540) – 117 × 93 cm
- Portrait of a Young Girl (1541–45) – 58 × 46,5 cm
- Portrait of Bia de' Medici (c. 1542) – Tempera on wood, 63 × 48 cm
- Portrait of Cosimo I de' Medici (1545) – 74 × 58 cm
- Portrait of Giovanni de' Medici as a Child (c. 1545) – 58 × 46 cm
- Portrait of Eleanor of Toledo (c. 1545) – 115 × 96 cm
- Portrait of Lucrezia Panciatichi (c. 1545) – 101 × 82.8 cm
- Portrait of Francesco I de' Medici (1551) – Tempera on wood, 58.5 × 41.5 cm
- Portrait of Maria de' Medici (1551) – Tempera on wood, 52.5 × 38 cm
- Allegory of Happiness (1564) – Oil on copper, 40 × 30 cm

==== Elsewhere in Florence ====
- Christ in Limbo (1552) – Museo dell'Opera di Santa Croce
- Portrait of the Dwarf Nano Morgante (1552) – Palazzo Pitti
- Portrait of Laura Battiferri (1555–60) – Oil on canvas, 83 × 60 cm, Palazzo Vecchio
- Deposition of Christ (1565) – 350 × 235 cm, Galleria dell'Accademia

=== Elsewhere in Italy ===
- Portrait of Lorenzo Lenzi (1527–28) – Castello Sforzesco, Milan
- Portrait of Andrea Doria as Neptune (1550–55) – Oil on canvas, 115 × 53 cm, Pinacoteca di Brera, Milan
- Portrait of Dante (1530) – Milan
- St. John the Baptist (1550–55) – 120 × 92 cm, Galleria Borghese, Rome (Inv. 444)
- Portrait of Stefano Colonna (1546) – 125 × 95 cm, Galleria Nazionale d'Arte Antica (Palazzo Barberini), Rome (Inv. 1434)
- Portrait of a Lady (c. 1550) – 109 × 85 cm, Galleria Sabauda, Turin

=== Europe and UK ===
==== Austria ====
- The Holy Family with St. Anna and the Boy John (c. 1540) – 126.8 × 101.5 cm, Kunsthistorisches Museum, Vienna (Gemäldegalerie, 183)

==== Croatia ====
- Drawing of an idealized female head (1503–1572) -– 0.375 × 0.245 cm, Mimara Museum, Zagreb ()

==== France ====
- Portrait of a Man Holding a Statuette (c. 1550) – transferred to canvas, 99 × 79 cm, Louvre, Paris (INV 131)
- Holy Family with Saint Elizabeth and infant John the Baptist (1560/61) – 133 × 101 cm, Louvre, Paris (RF 1348)
- Christ Appearing as a Gardener to the Three Maries or Noli me tangere (1561) – Oil on canvas, 289 × 194 cm, Louvre, Paris (INV 130)
- Deposition of Christ (1540–45) – 268 × 173 cm, Musée des Beaux-Arts, Besançon
- Christ on the Cross (c. 1545) – 145 × 115 cm, Musée des Beaux-Arts, Nice

==== Germany ====
- Portrait of Ugolino Martelli (before 1537) – 102 × 85 cm, Gemäldegalerie, Berlin

==== Hungary ====
- Adoration of the Shepherds (1535–40) – 65,3 × 46,7 cm, Szépművészeti Múzeum, Budapest
- Venus, Cupid and Jealousy (or Envy) (c. 1550) – 192 × 142 cm, Szépművészeti Múzeum, Budapest

==== Russia ====
- The Holy Family with the Infant Saint John the Baptist (or Madonna Stroganoff) (early 1540s) – Oil on canvas, 117 × 99 cm, Pushkin Museum, Moscow (Inv. 2699)

==== Spain ====
- Portrait of Alessandro de' Medici (1540–53) – 34,9 × 26,2 cm, Cerralbo Museum, Madrid.
- Portrait of Garcia de' Medici (c. 1550) –48 × 38 cm, Museo del Prado, Madrid (Inv. P000005)
- St. Sebastian (c. 1533) – 87 × 77 cm, Museo Thyssen-Bornemisza, Madrid
- Portrait of Cosimo I de' Medici (c. 1545) – 76,5 × 59 cm, Museo Thyssen-Bornemisza, Madrid.

==== UK ====
- Venus, Cupid, Folly and Time (Allegory; 1540–45) – 146 × 116 cm, National Gallery, London
- Portrait of a Lady in Green (1530–32) – 76,7 × 65,4 cm, Royal Collection, Windsor

=== North America ===
- Portrait of a Lady (c. 1540) – 127 × 100 cm, Legion of Honor, San Francisco
- Portrait of Ludovico Capponi (1551) – 117 × 86 cm, Frick Collection, New York
- Portrait of a Young Man with a Book (c. 1540) – 96 × 75 cm, Metropolitan Museum of Art, New York
- PortraIt of a Young Man (possibly Pierino da Vinci) (c. 1550) – Metropolitan Museum of Art, New York
- Portrait of Pierantonio Bandini (c. 1550–55) – 106,7 × 82,5 cm, National Gallery of Canada, Ottawa
- Portrait of Cosimo I de' Medici as Orpheus(c. 1537–39) – 93,7 × 76,4 cm, Philadelphia Museum of Art (1950-86-1)

== Gallery ==
Portraits

Portrait of a Lady, c. 1540, Legion of Honor, San Francisco

A Portrait of an Unknown Woman and Boy, c. 1540, National Gallery of Art, Washington

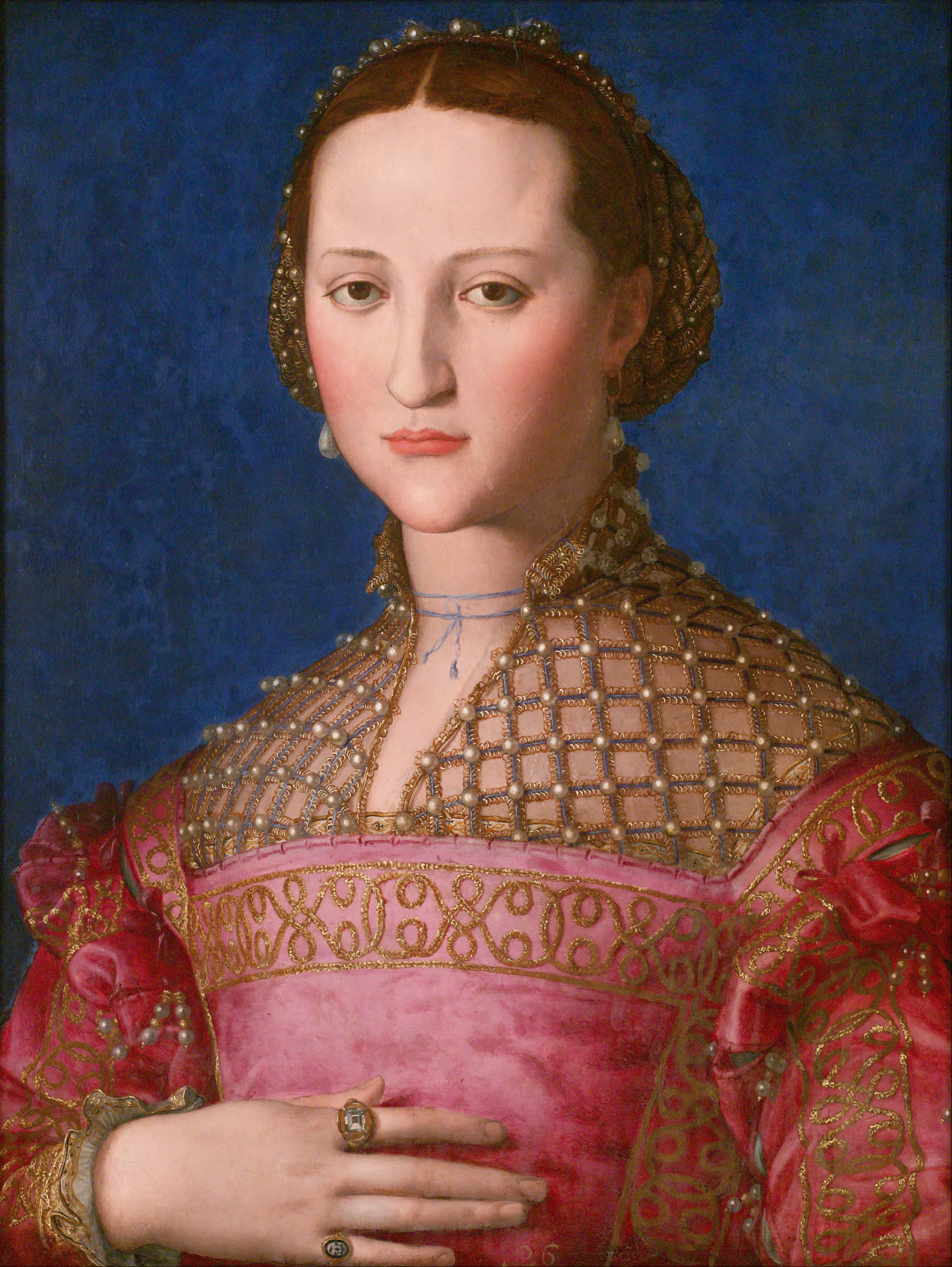
Portrait of Eleonora of Toledo, c. 1543, National Gallery Prague

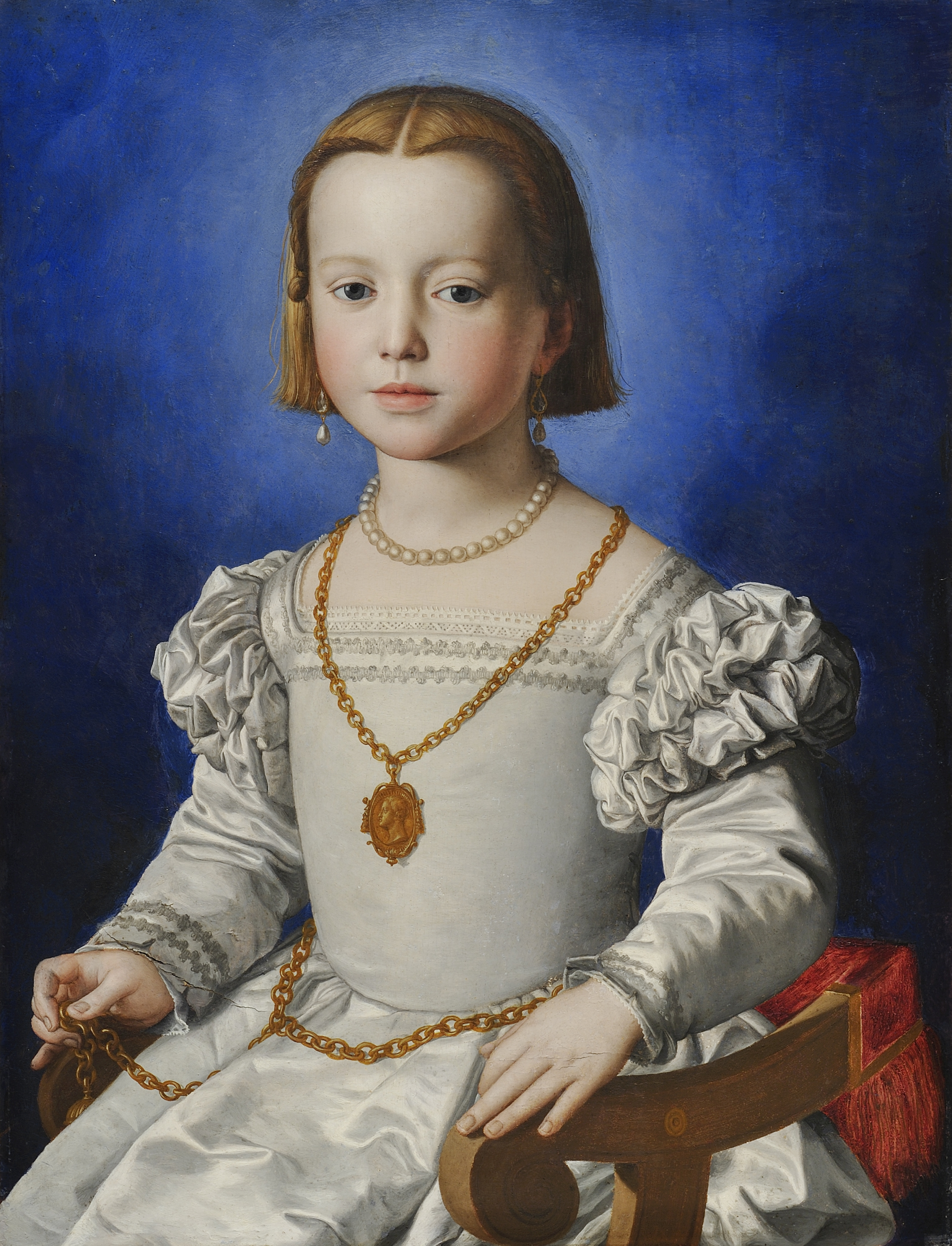
Portrait of Bia di Cosimo de' Medici, 1545, Uffizi, Florence

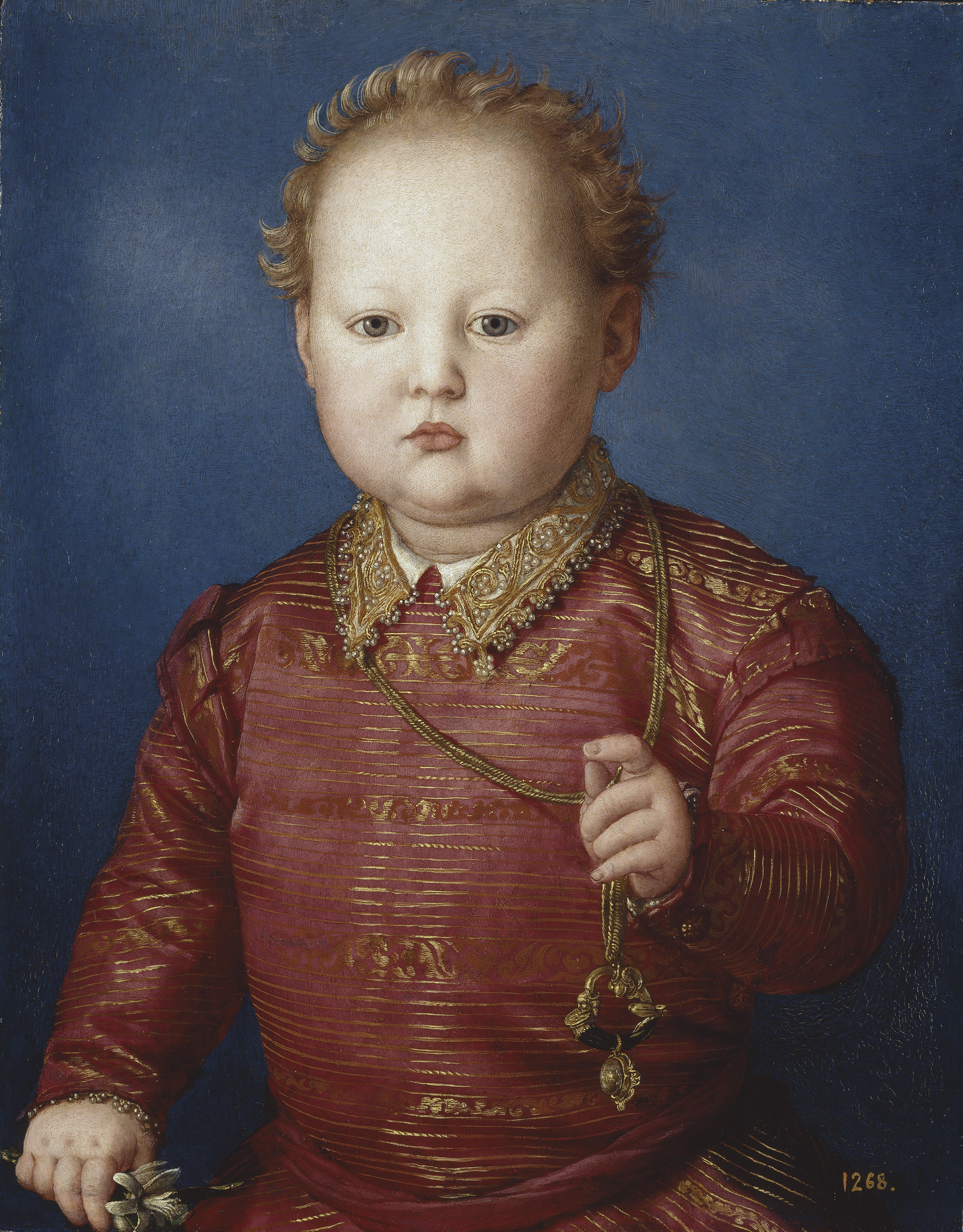
Portrait of Garcia de' Medici, 1550, Prado, Madrid

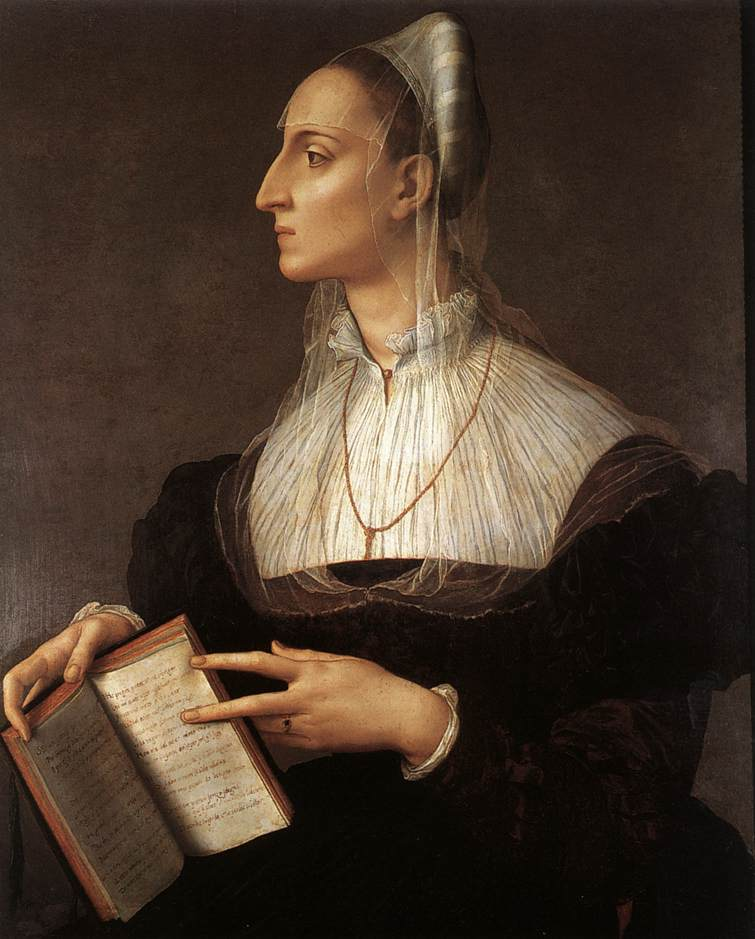
Portrait of Laura Battiferri, 1555–60, Palazzo Vecchio, Florence

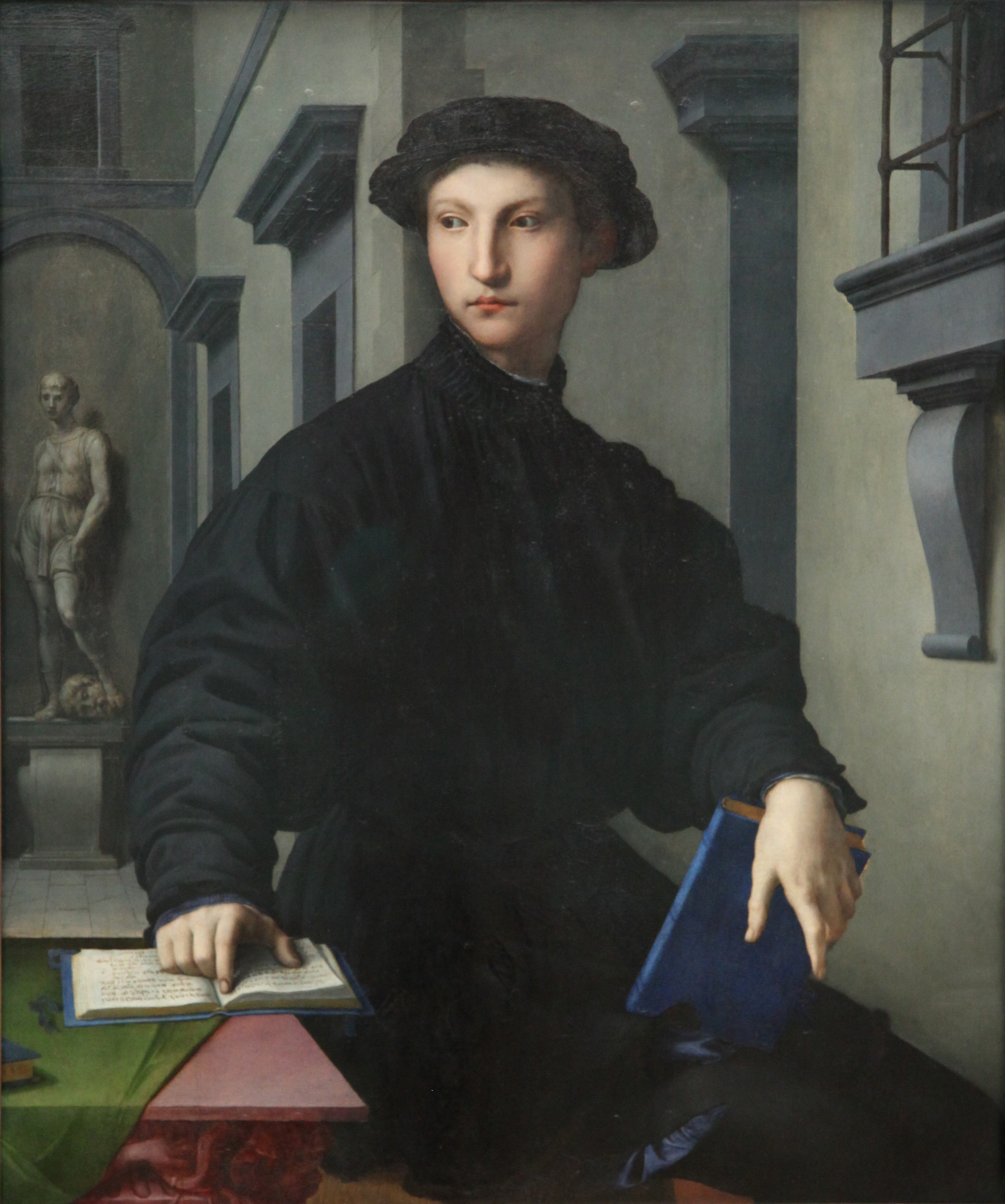
Ugolino Martelli, bef. 1537, Gemäldegalerie, Berlin

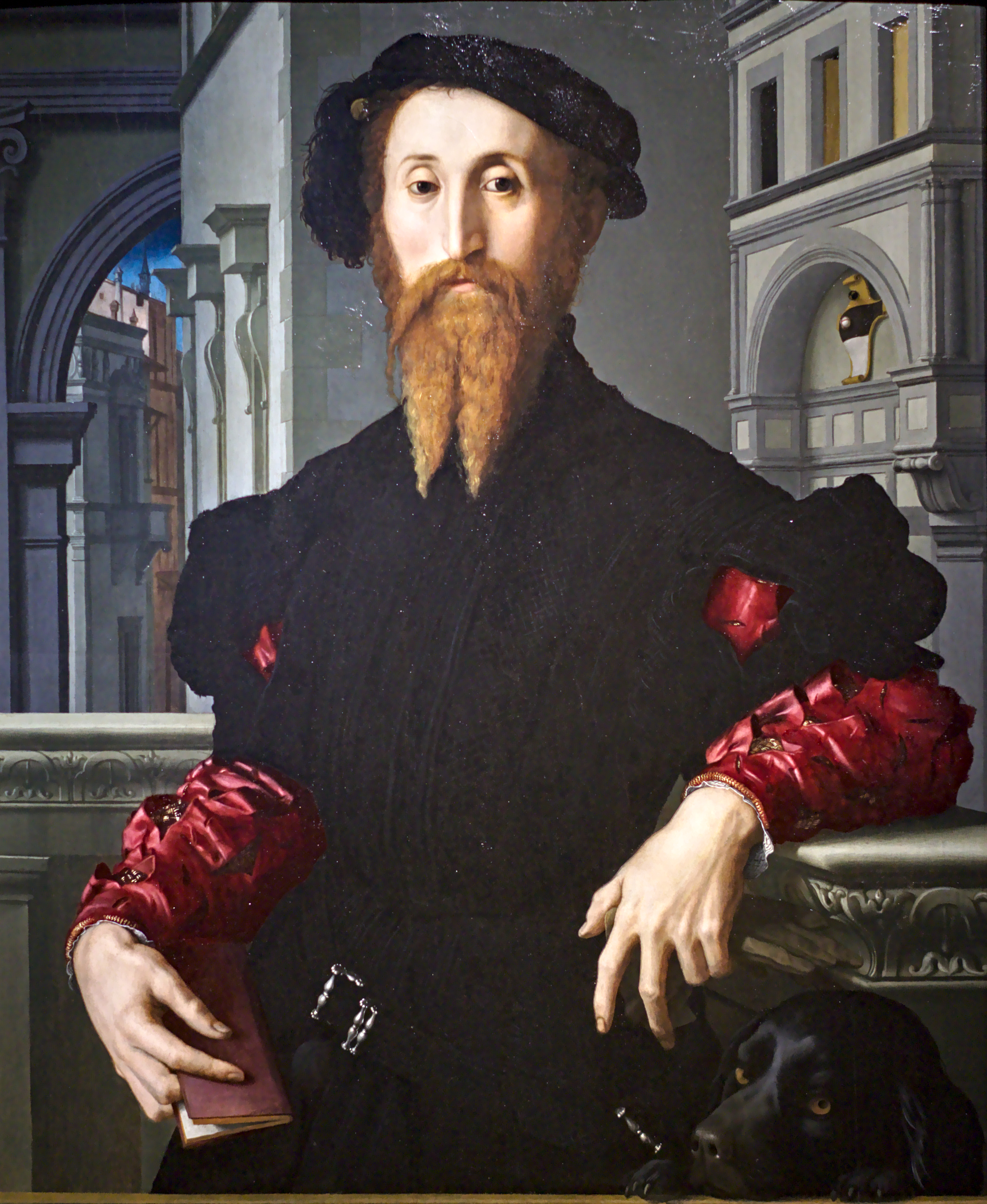
Portrait of Bartolomeo Panciatichi, c. 1540, Uffizi, Florence

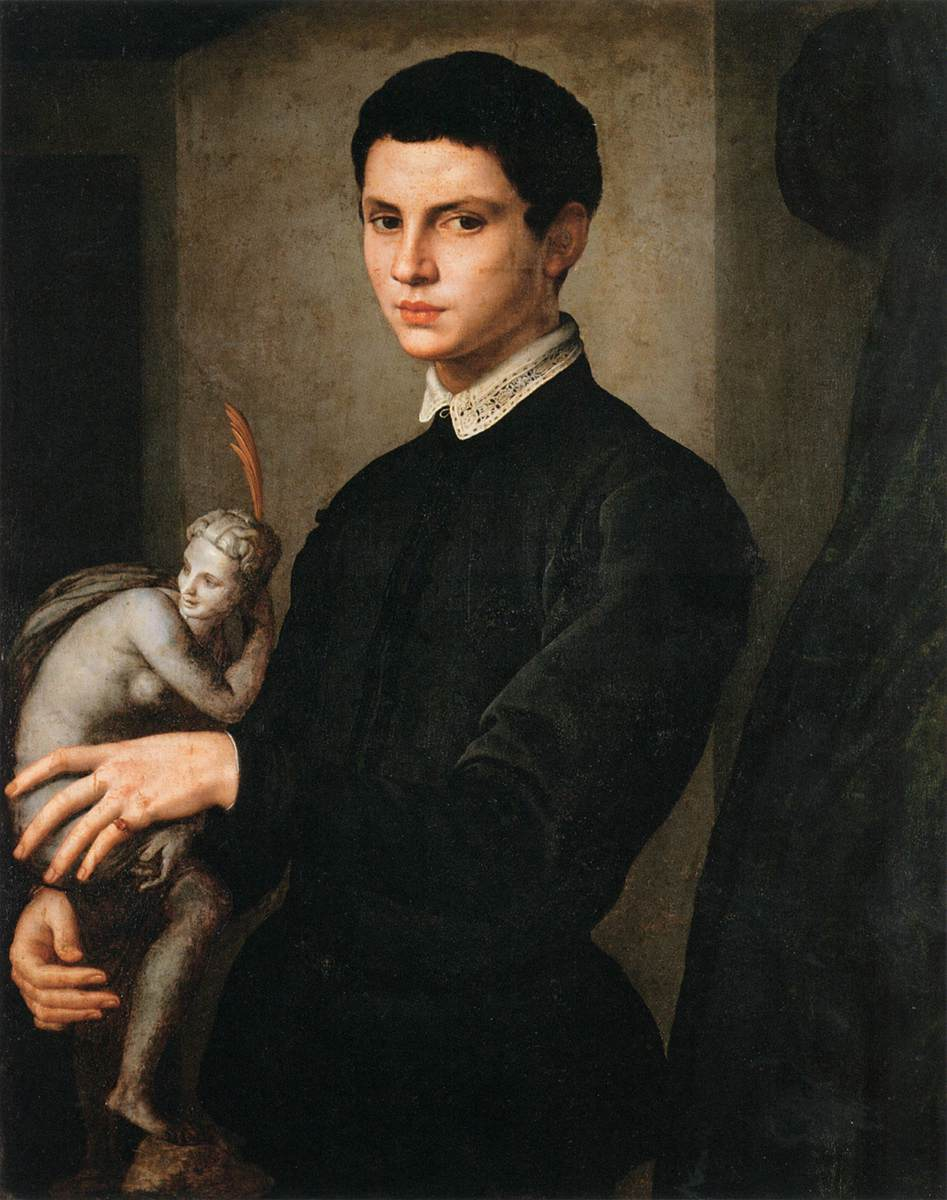
Portrait of a Man Holding a Statuette, c. 1550, Louvre, Paris

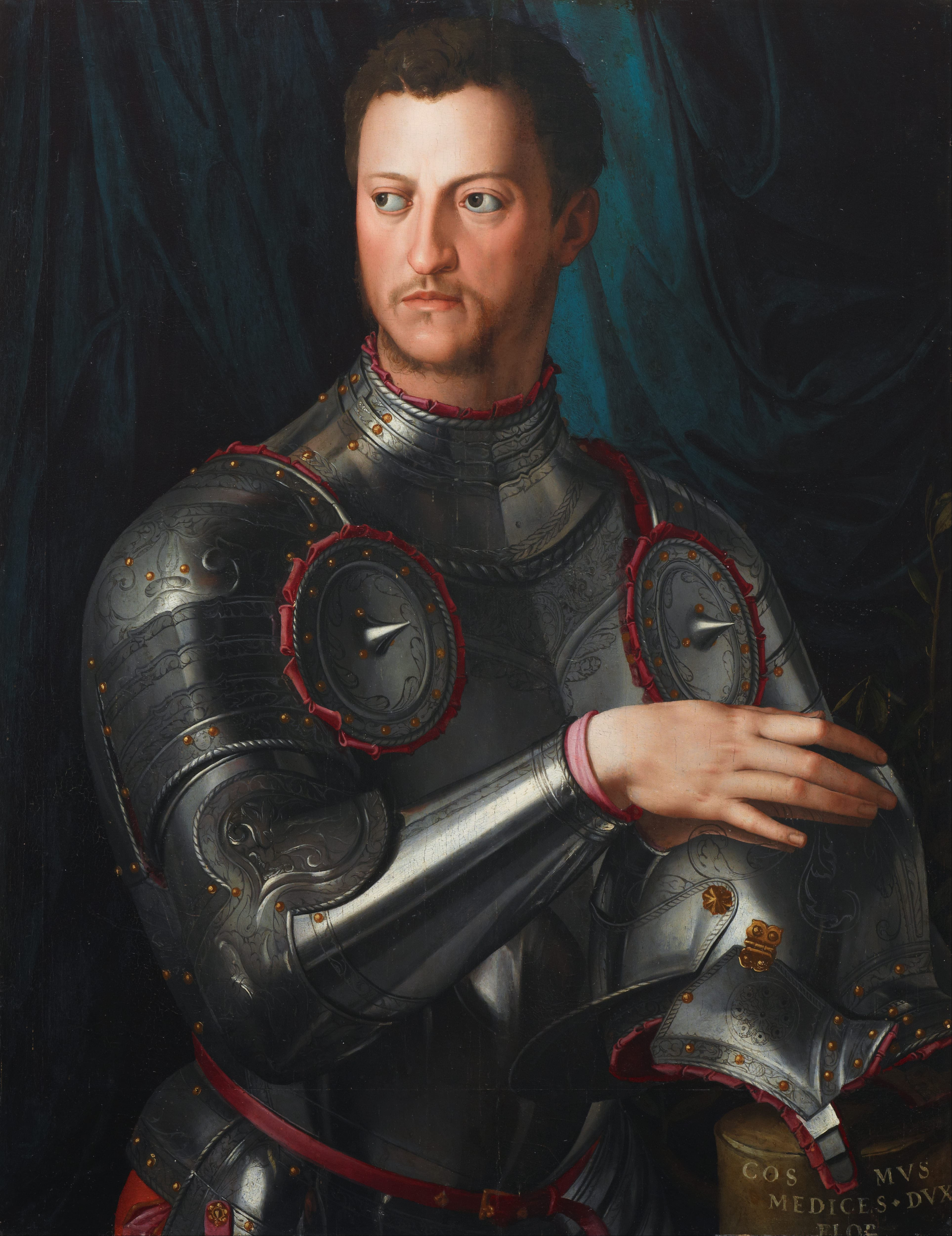
Portrait Cosimo I de' Medici in Armour, c. 1545, Art Gallery of New South Wales, Sydney

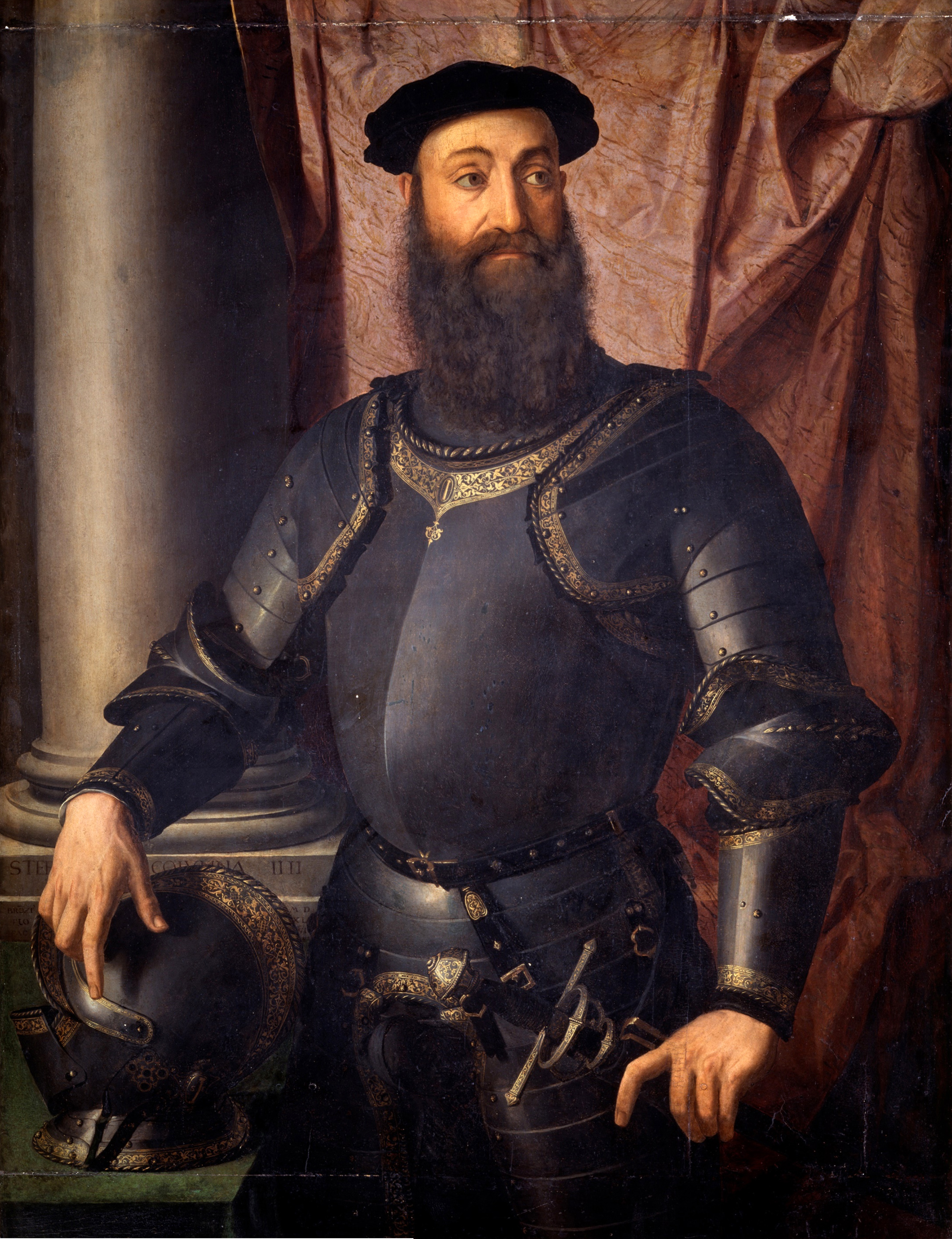
Portrait of Stefano IV Colonna, 1546, Galleria Nazionale d'Arte Antica, Rome
Religious and allegorical subjects

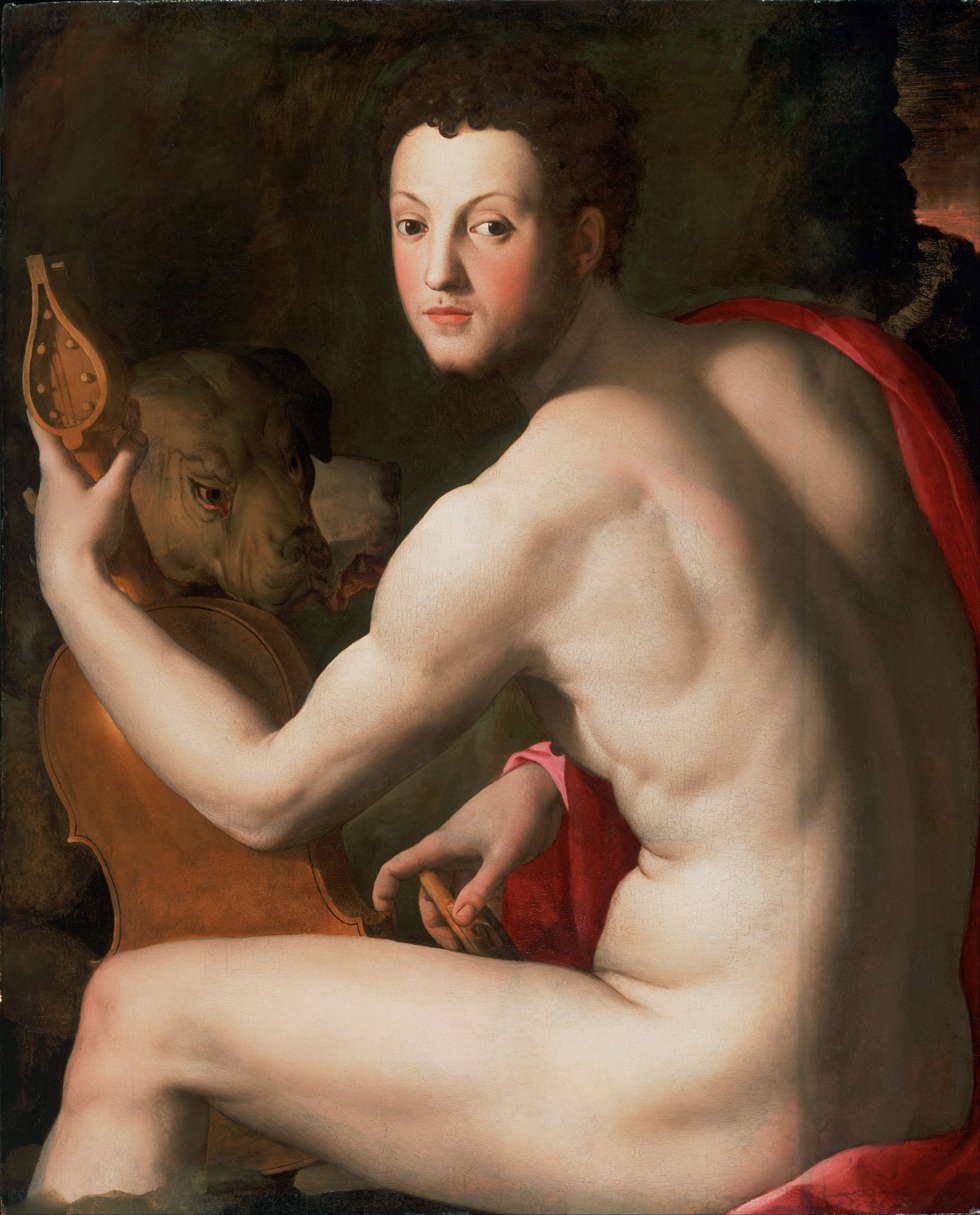
Portrait of Cosimo I de' Medici as Orpheus, c. 1537–39, Philadelphia Museum of Art

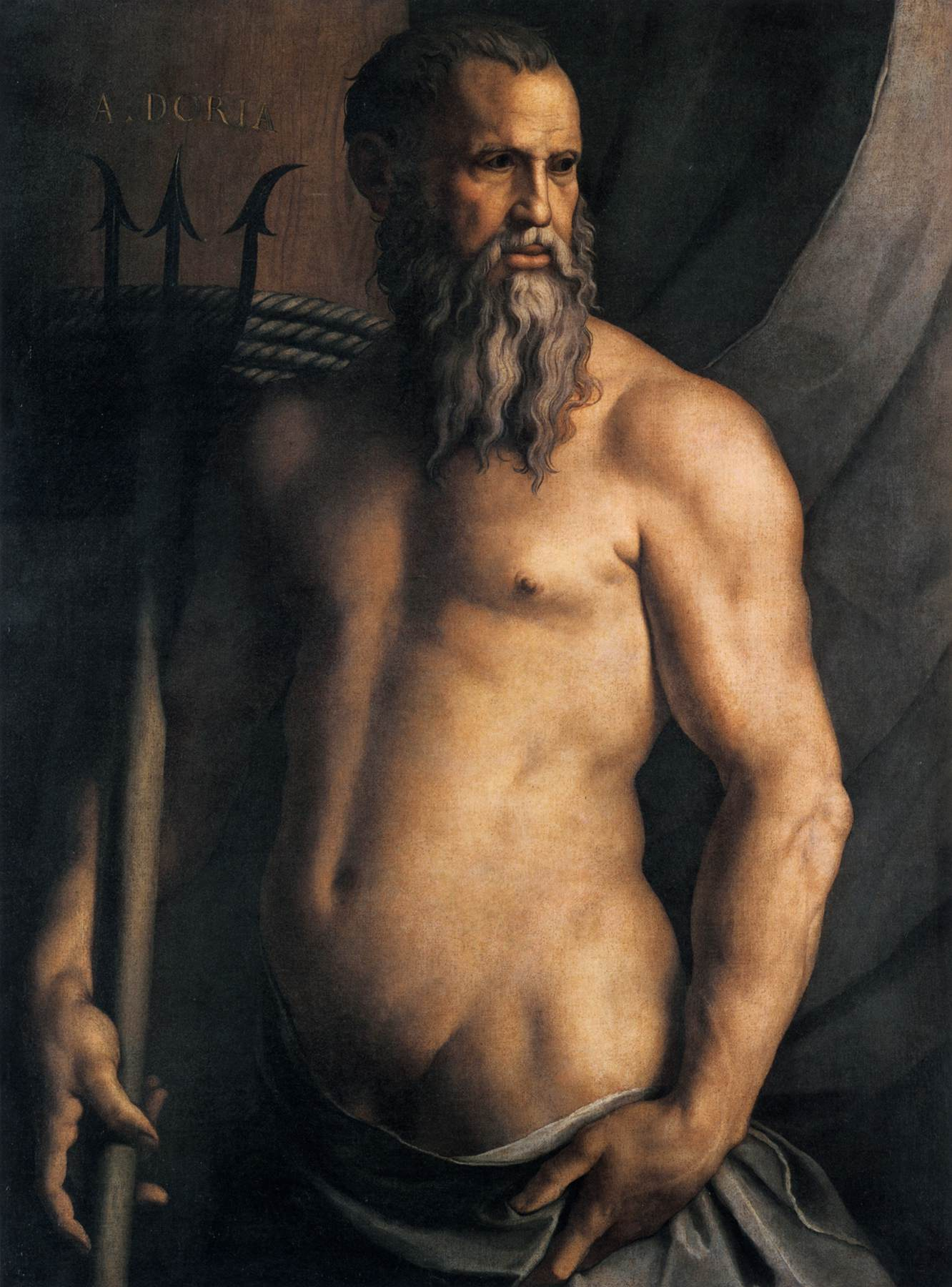
Andrea Doria as Neptune, 1550–55, Pinacoteca di Brera, Milan

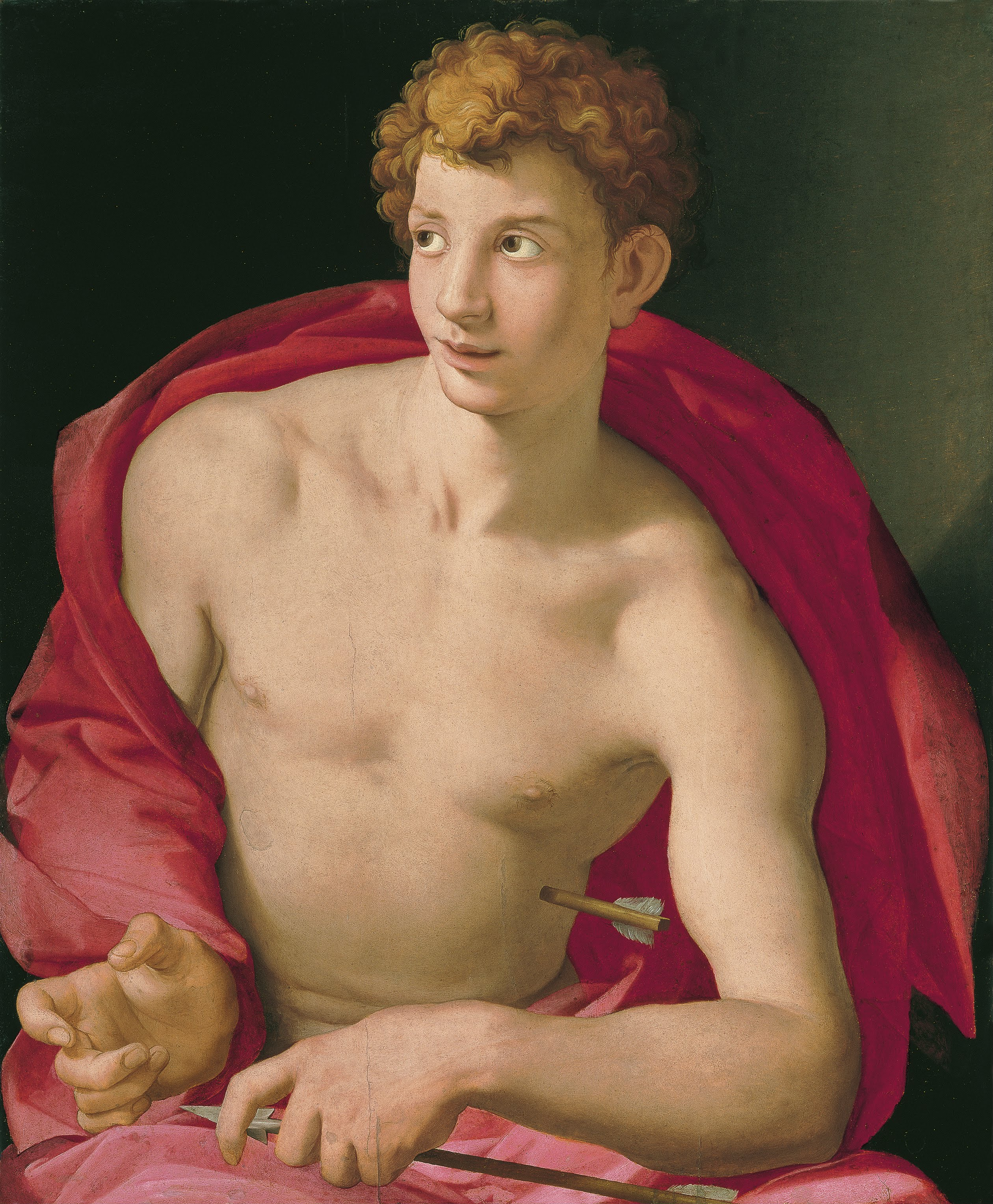
Portrait of a Young Man as Saint Sebastian, 1533, Museo Thyssen-Bornemisza, Madrid

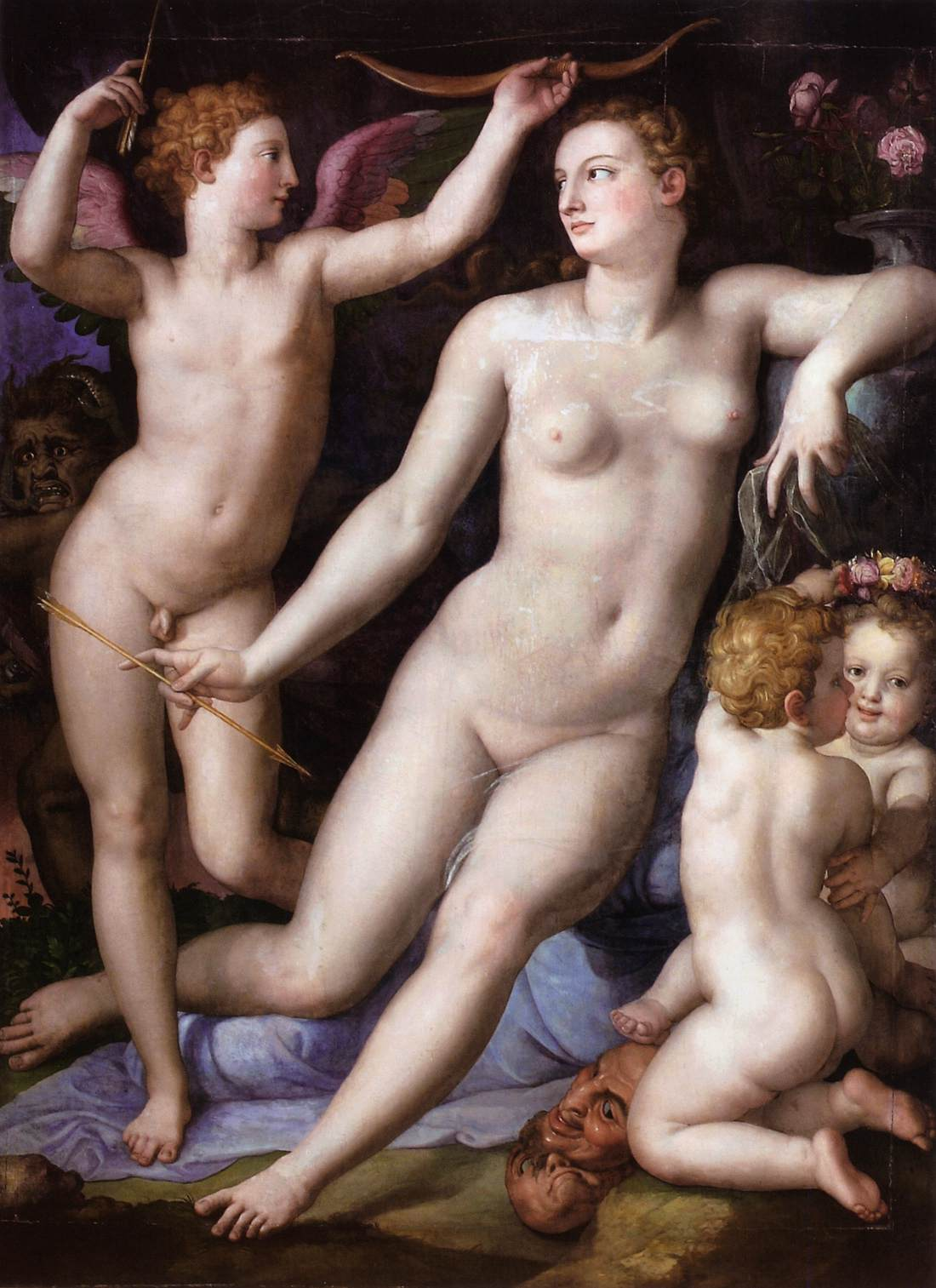
Venus, Cupid and Jealousy, c. 1548–50, Szépművészeti Múzeum, Budapest

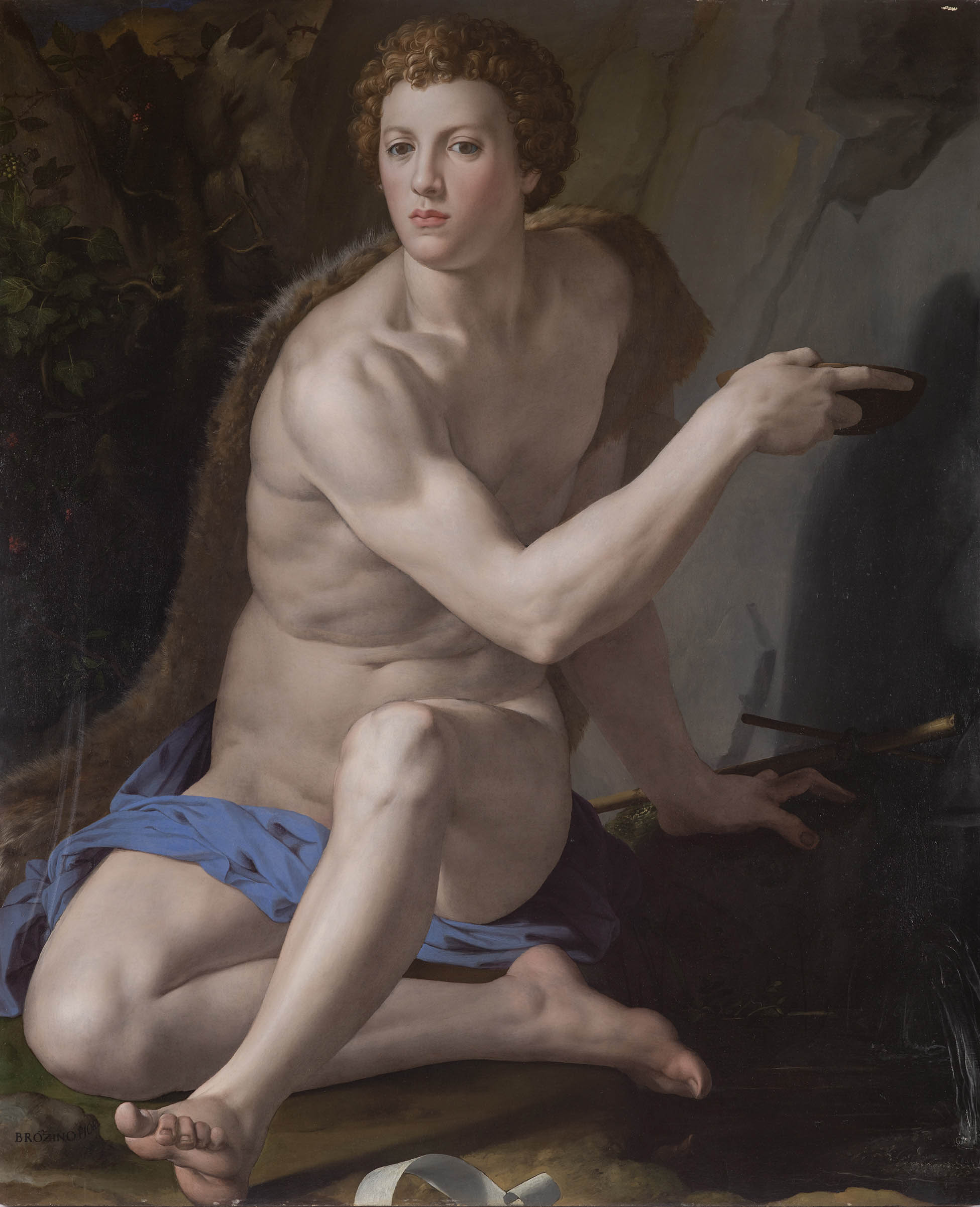
John the Baptist, 1550–55, Galleria Borghese, Rome

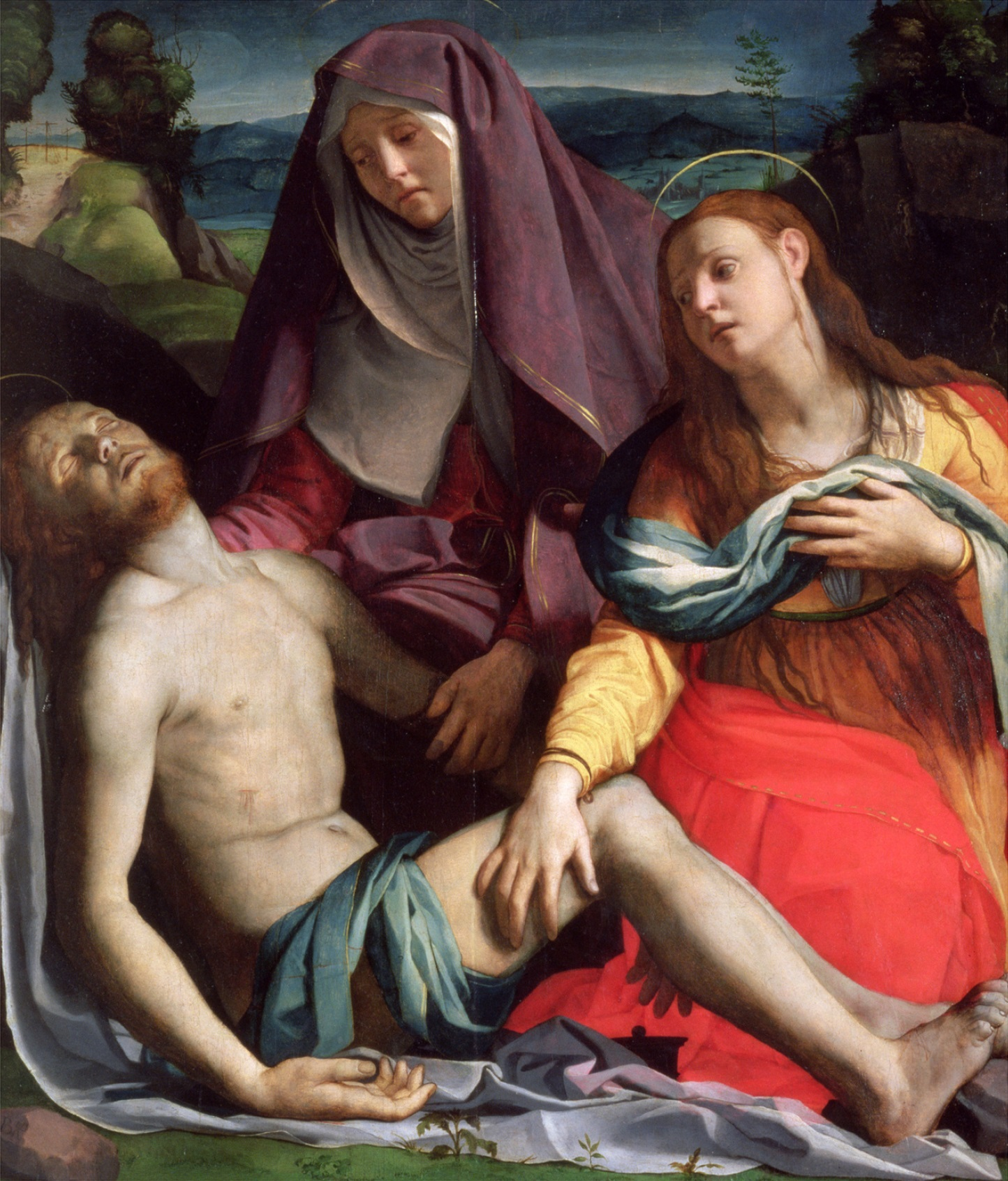
Pietà, 1530, Uffizi, Florence

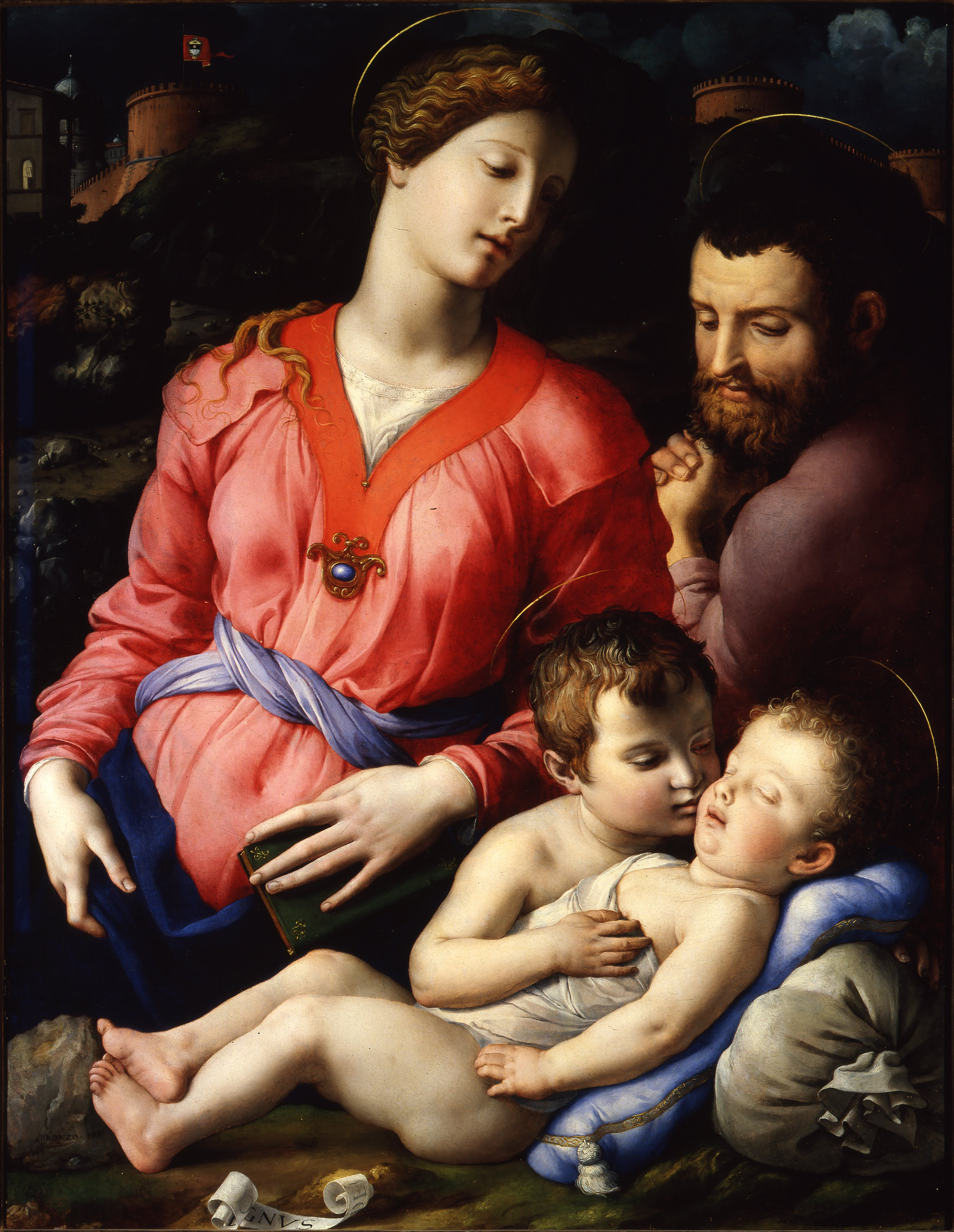
Holy Family or Madonna Panciatichi, 1540, Uffizi, Florence

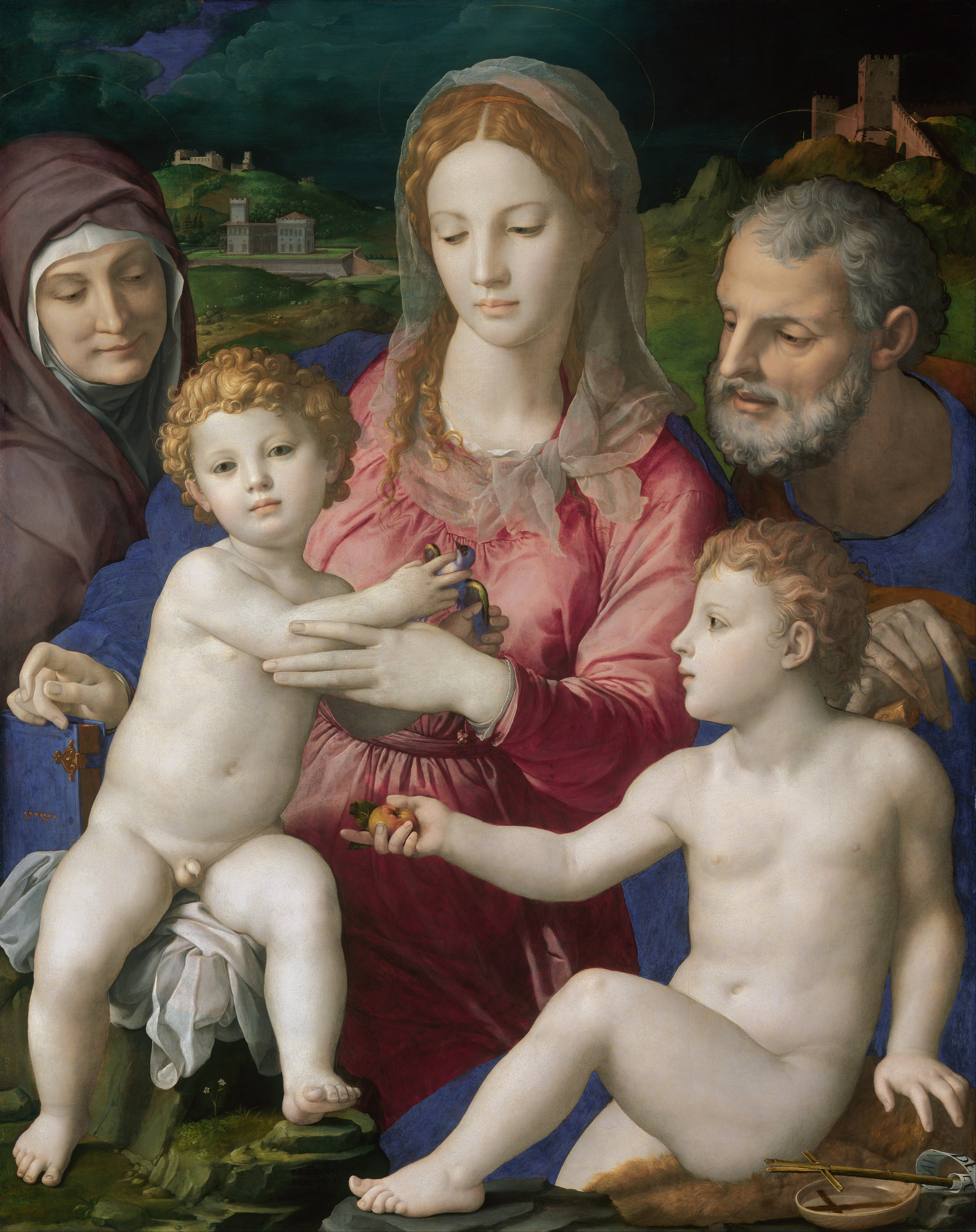
The Holy Family with St. Anna and the Boy John, c. 1540, Kunsthistorisches Museum, Vienna

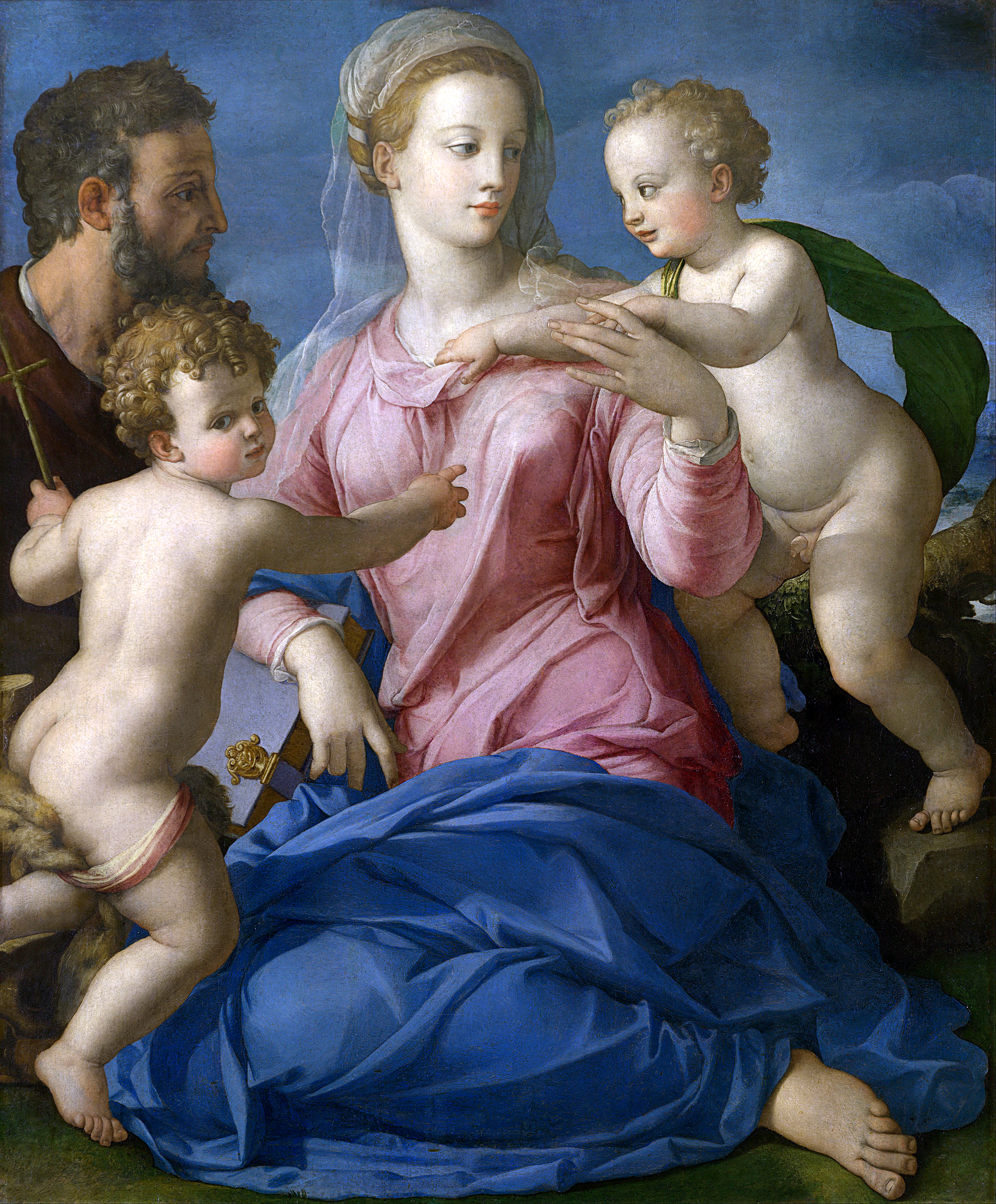
Madonna Stroganoff, early 1540s, Pushkin Museum, Moscow

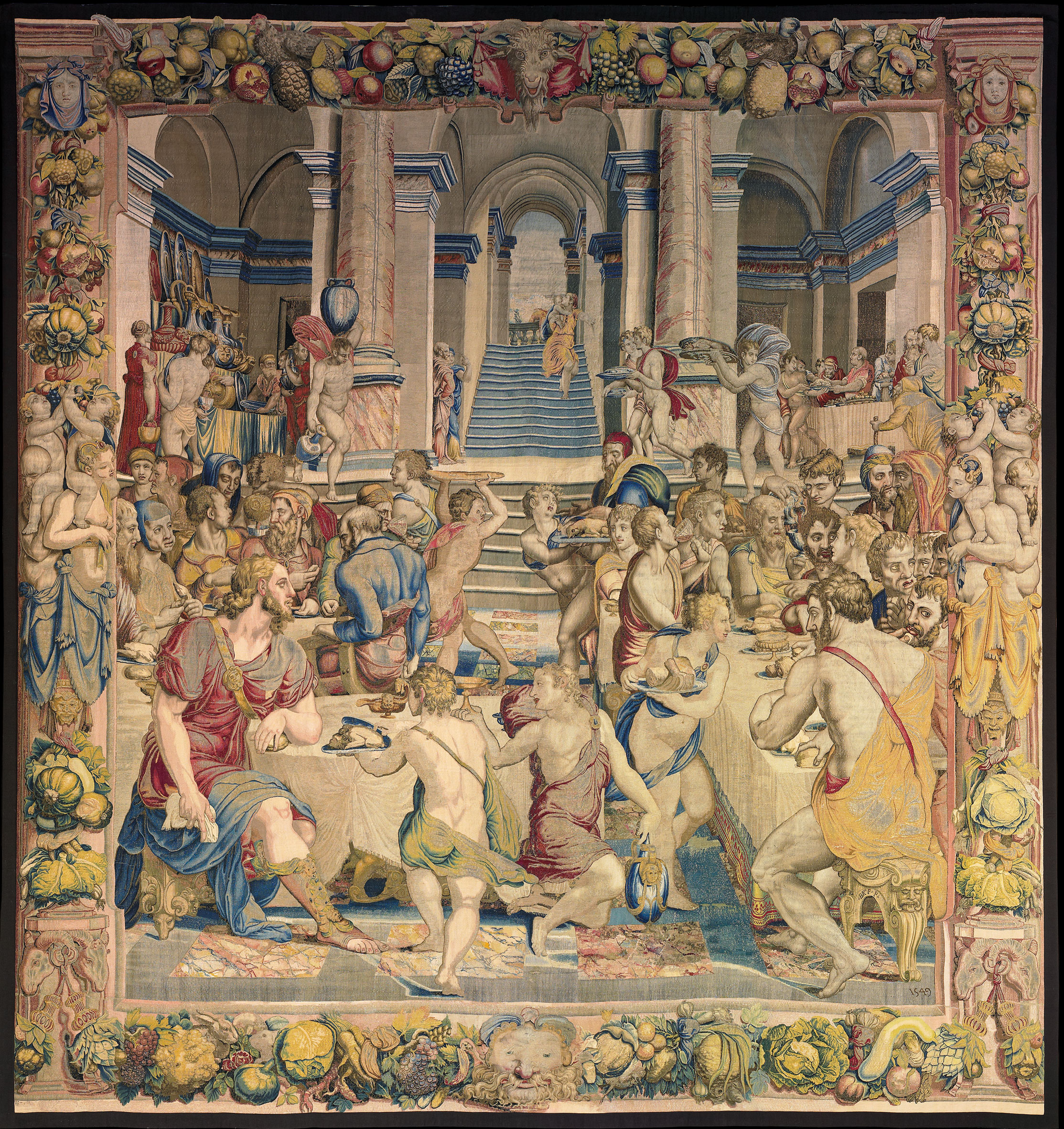
Tapestry with the Stories of Joseph after designs by Bronzino, ca. 1530–53, Palazzo del Quirinale, Rome
