= Adoration of the Shepherds (Bronzino) =

Painting by Bronzino

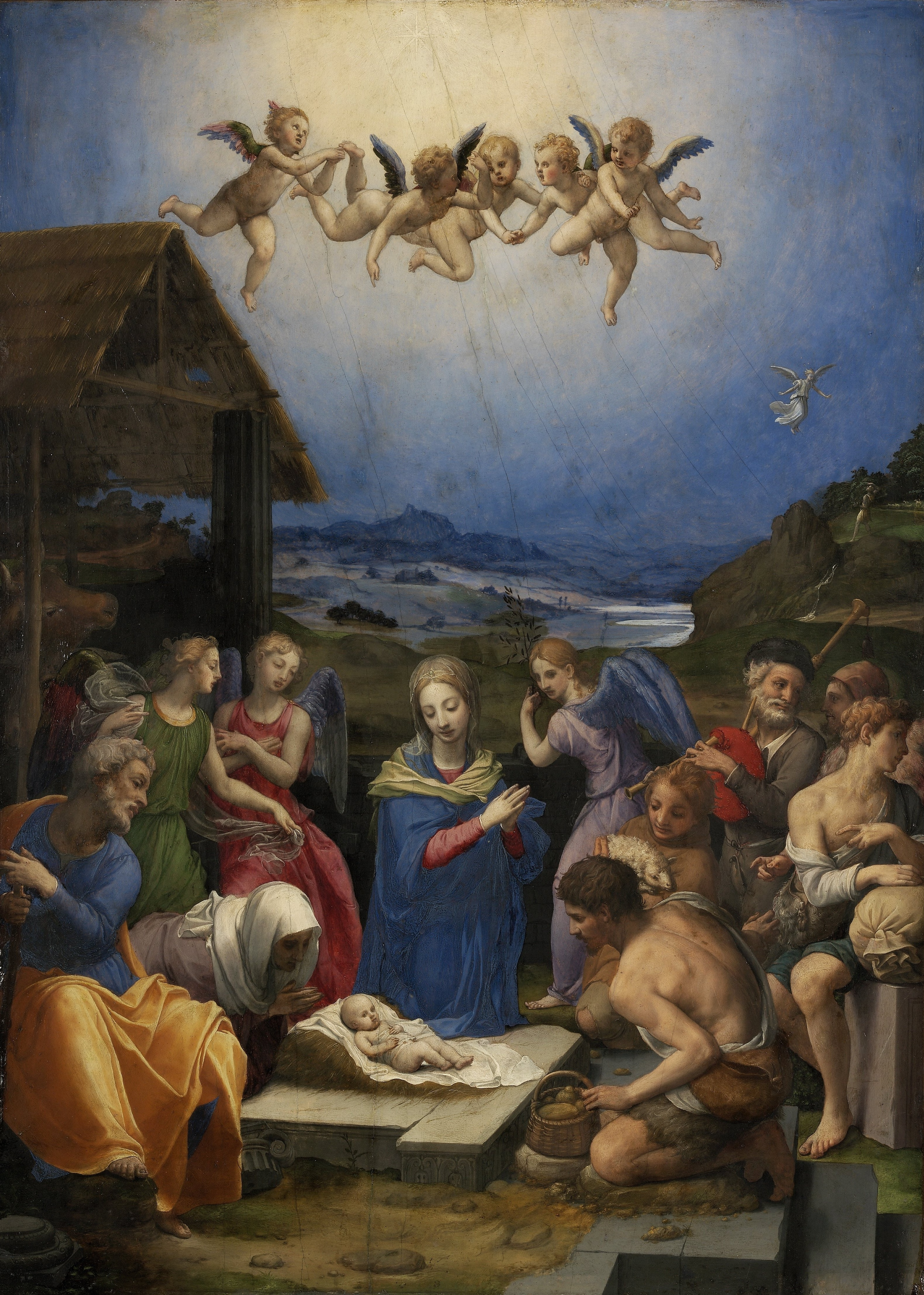
Adoration of the Shepherds (1539–1540) by Bronzino

Adoration of the Shepherds is an oil-on-poplar painting executed ca. 1539–1540 by the Italian Mannerist painter Bronzino, now in the Museum of Fine Arts in Budapest, Hungary.
