= Portrait of Stefano Colonna =

Painting by Bronzino

Portrait of Stefano IV Colonna
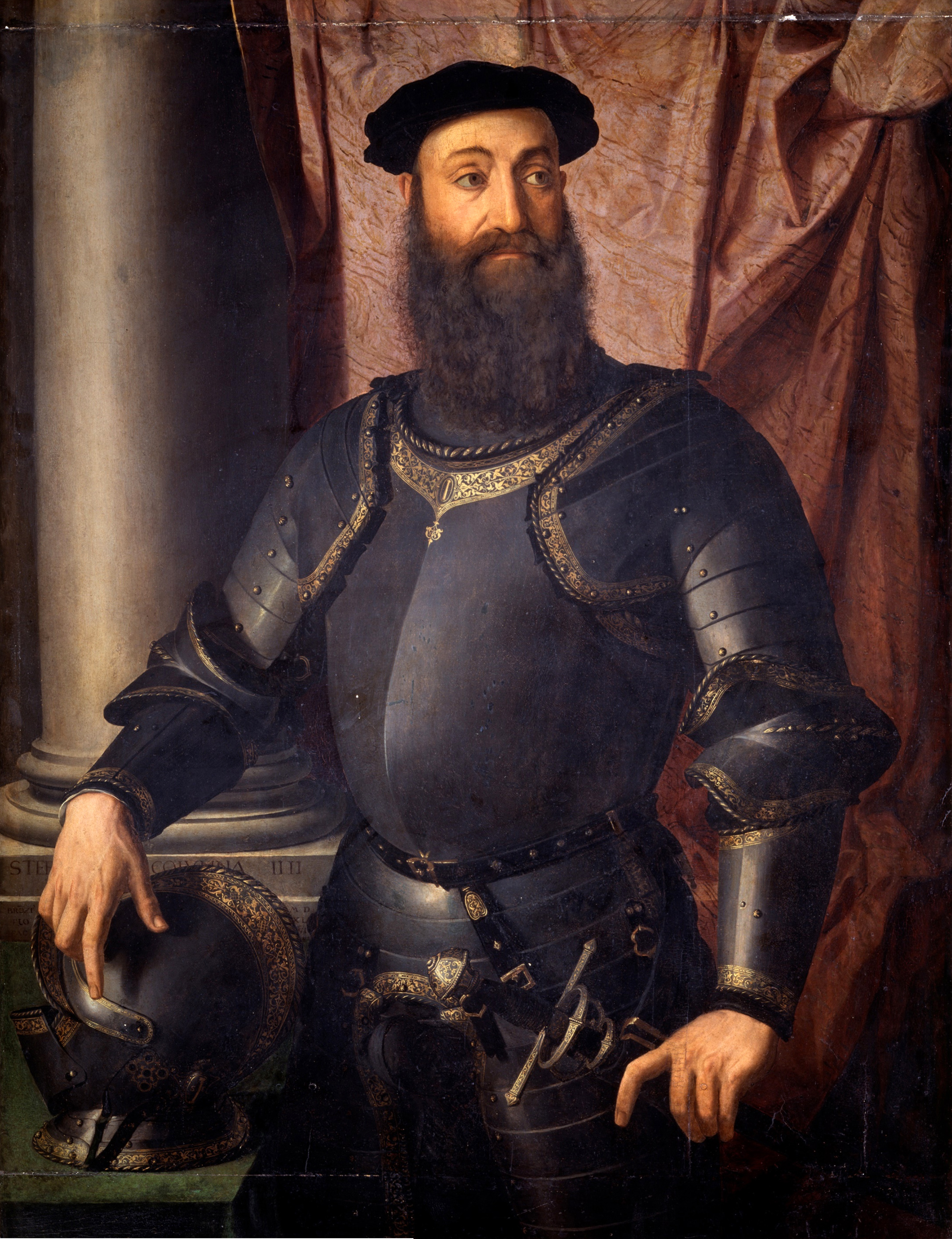
- Artist: Bronzino
- Year: 1546
- Medium: Oil on canvas
- Dimensions: 125 cm × 95 cm (49 in × 37 in)
- Location: Gallerie Nazionali di Arte Antica; Rome

Portrait of Stefano IV Colonna is an oil on canvas painting completed in 1546 by the Italian Renaissance painter Bronzino and housed in the Pinacoteca of the Gallerie Nazionali di Arte Antica (Palazzo Barberini) in Rome, Italy.

== Description ==
The portrait of the condottiero is dated 1546 at the bottom of the column. Stefano was a member of the Roman Colonna family and served as a mercenary lieutenant general of the armies of the Duke Cosimo de' Medici.

The portrait is similar to the 1530 portrait by Bronzino depicting Guidobaldo della Rovere, a painting held in the Palazzo Pitti. Colonna is girded with his dark armor and sword, with hand upon his helmet, standing before a column and red curtain. The condotierre died in 1548.
