= Portrait of Cosimo I de' Medici =

Painting by Bronzino

Portrait of Cosimo de' Medici
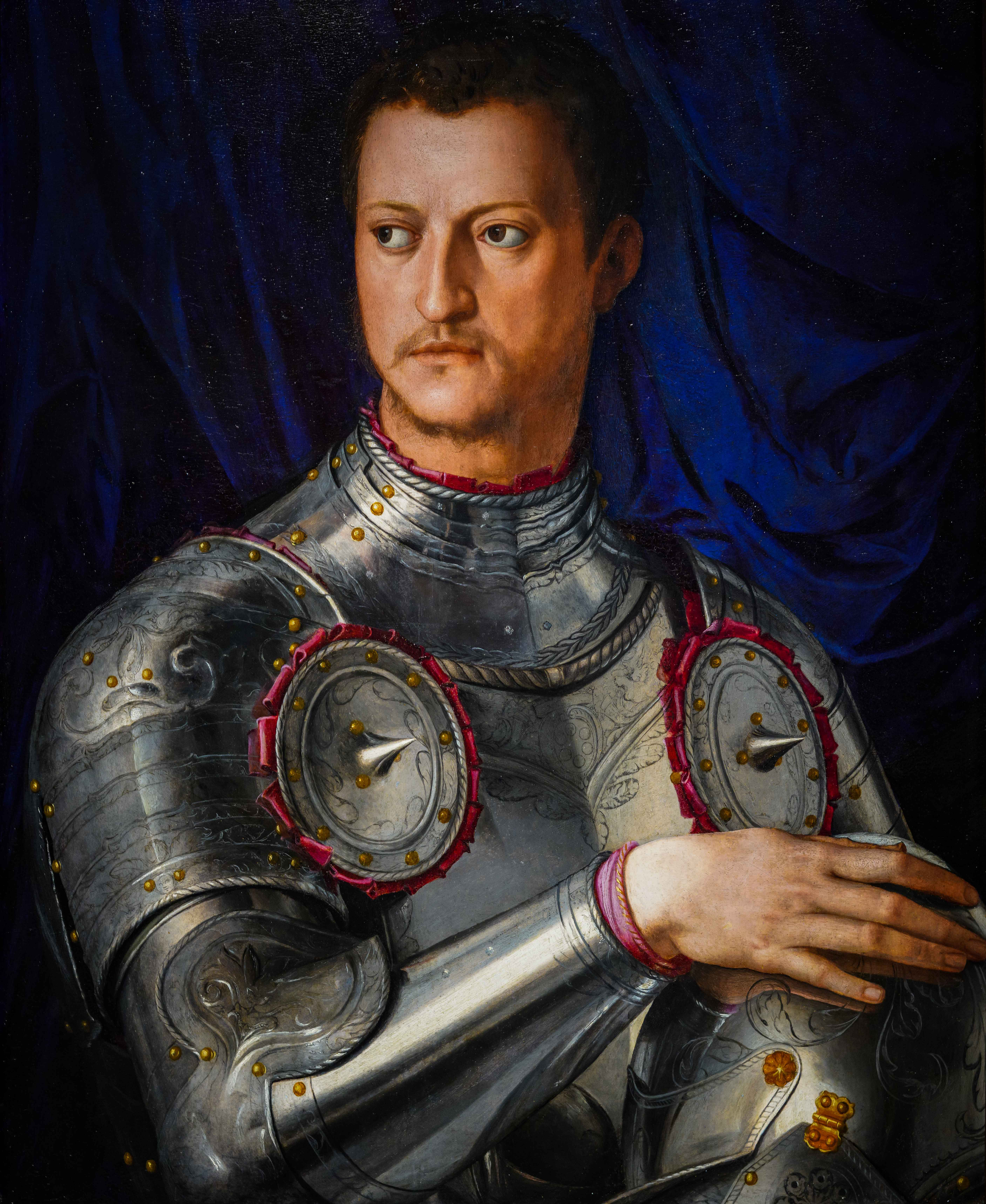
- Uffizi version
- Artist: Bronzino
- Year: 1545
- Medium: Tempera on panel
- Dimensions: 74 cm × 58 cm (29 in × 23 in)
- Location: Uffizi, Florence

The Portrait of Cosimo I de' Medici is a painting by the Italian artist Agnolo di Cosimo, known as Bronzino, finished in 1545. In his position as court painter for the Medici, Bronzino was author of several portraits of Grand Duke Cosimo I de' Medici. In this portrait, Cosimo is represented in his younger years, commanding and proud; and to quote Giorgio Vasari, "clad with white armor and a hand over the helmet". It has been identified as having been painted in the Medicis' Villa of Poggio a Caiano in 1545.

Bronzino's portrait captures Duke Cosimo I following a great diplomatic triumph. Cosimo had, at long last, rid Florence of the Spanish garrisons that had been stationed there since the early 1530s, when Pope Clement VII (Giulio de' Medici) and Holy Roman Emperor Charles V agreed that Florence would become an Imperial duchy, governed by the Medici. Charles V stationed the garrisons in Florence ostensibly to protect its first duke, Alessandro de Medici, from those who might rise up against him or otherwise do him harm. Cosimo I however chafed under the watch of the Spanish troops, and in 1543, in return for a monetary payment to Charles V, (the latter needed funds to fight Protestants in Northern Europe), the duke obtained the evacuation of the garrisons stationed in Florence.

Bronzino and his workshop painted about 25 only slightly differing versions of the portrait.

== List of versions ==
Simon Version Number	Year	Image	Dimensions	Catalog entry & title	Collection
8.	1543-1545		74 x 58 cm	ritratto di Cosimo I de' Medici	Uffizi
12.	circa 1545		76 x 59 cm	Portrait of Cosimo I de' Medici in armour	National Museum in Poznań
19.	circa 1545		86.0 x 66.8 cm	Cosimo I de' Medici in armour	Art Gallery of New South Wales
14.	circa 1545		76.5 x 59 cm	Cosimo de Medici in Armour	Thyssen-Bornemisza Museum
23.	1545 or after		101.6 x 77.8 cm	Cosimo I de’Medici	Toledo Museum of Art
16.	1546-1548		77.5 x 60.2 cm	ritratto di Cosimo I de' Medici	Galleria Palatina
24.	1546-1550		105 x 87 cm	ritratto di Cosimo I de' Medici	Tesoro dei Granduchi
20.	circa 1550		94.8 x 65.2 cm	Portrait of Cosimo I Grand Duke of Tuscany	Gemäldegalerie Alte Meister (Kassel)
21.	1572		95.9 x 70.5 cm	Cosimo I de' Medici (1519–1574)	Metropolitan Museum of Art
26.			181 x 103 cm	Portrait of Gran Ducby Cosimo I de’ Medici in Armour	Museo Nazionale di Palazzo Mansi
