= Deposition of Christ (Bronzino) =

Painting by Bronzino

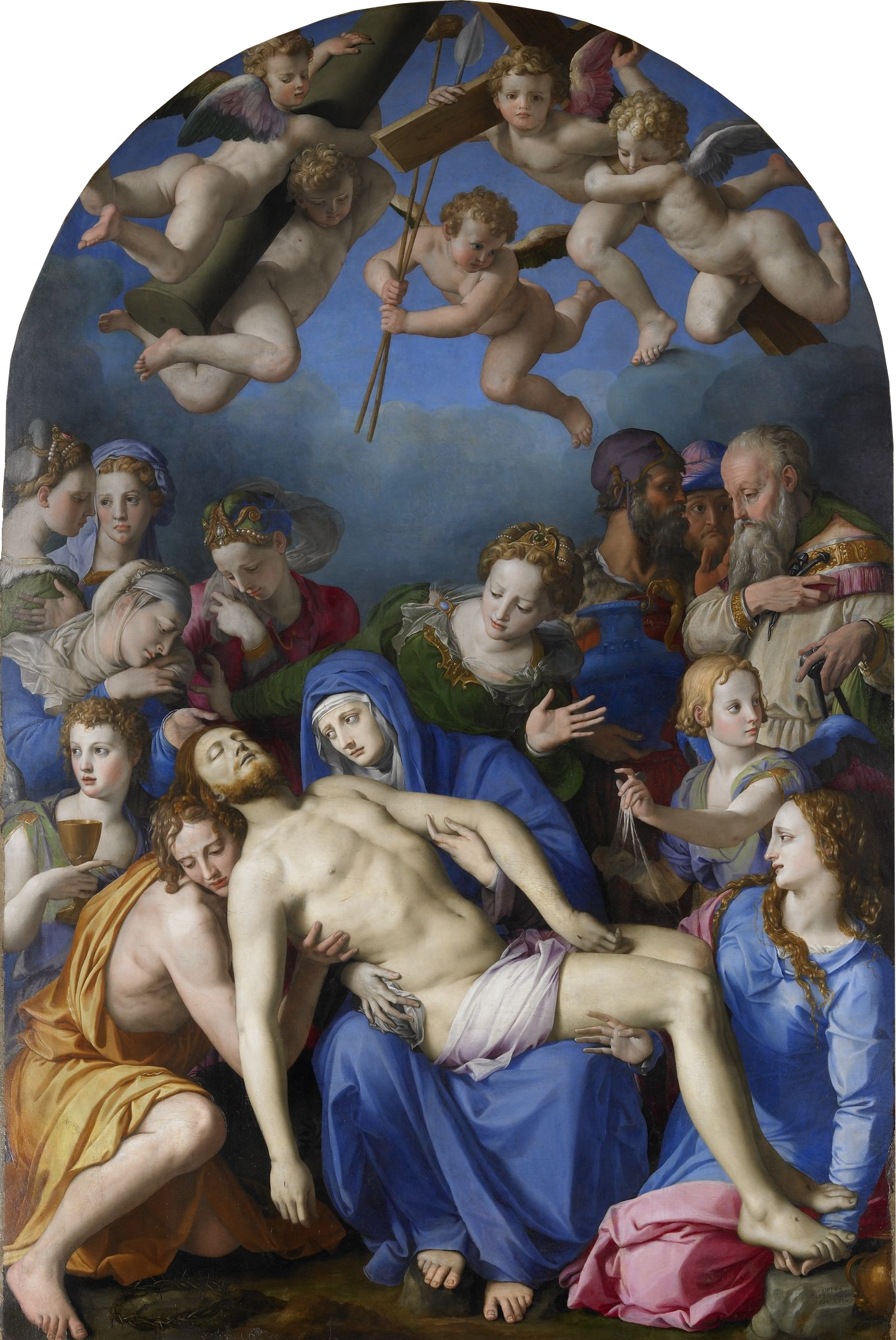
- Artist: Bronzino
- Year: 1545
- Medium: Oil on panel
- Dimensions: 268 cm × 173 cm (106 in × 68 in)
- Location: Musée des Beaux-Arts; Besançon

The Deposition of Christ is a painting by the Italian artist Agnolo di Cosimo, known as Bronzino, completed in 1545. It is housed in the Musée des Beaux-Arts de Besançon, France. A copy by Bronzino can be found in the Palazzo Vecchio. This portrayal of the Deposition, although it depicts all the characters typically shown when Jesus is being taken down from the cross, more correctly should be characterized as a Lamentation and is an excellent example of late Mannerism or Maniera.

== History ==
The painting was originally commissioned to be the altarpiece for the chapel of Eleonora of Toledo in the Palazzo Vecchio, Florence. Shortly after it was completed in 1545, Eleonora's husband, Grand Duke Cosimo I de' Medici, shipped the picture to Nicolas Perrenot de Granvelle, a chief counselor of the Holy Roman Emperor Charles V, as a diplomatic gift. Granvelle installed it in his private chapel in Besançon. In 1549, Granvelle commissioned the construction of a grander funerary chapel on his Besançon estate. A year later, he died. The new chapel, with Bronzino's altarpiece installed, was consecrated in 1551. Subsequently, there is no record of the work from the seventeenth century until the French Revolution. To preserve it after Granvelle's chapel was partially destroyed, the picture was housed in the Besançon city hall from 1793 until it became a part of the collection of the Musée des Beaux-Arts when the museum opened in 1834.

After sending the original to Granvelle in 1545, Cosimo requested a copy for Eleonora's chapel that Bronzino painted eight years later in 1553. The second version is the one found in the Palazzo Vecchio today.

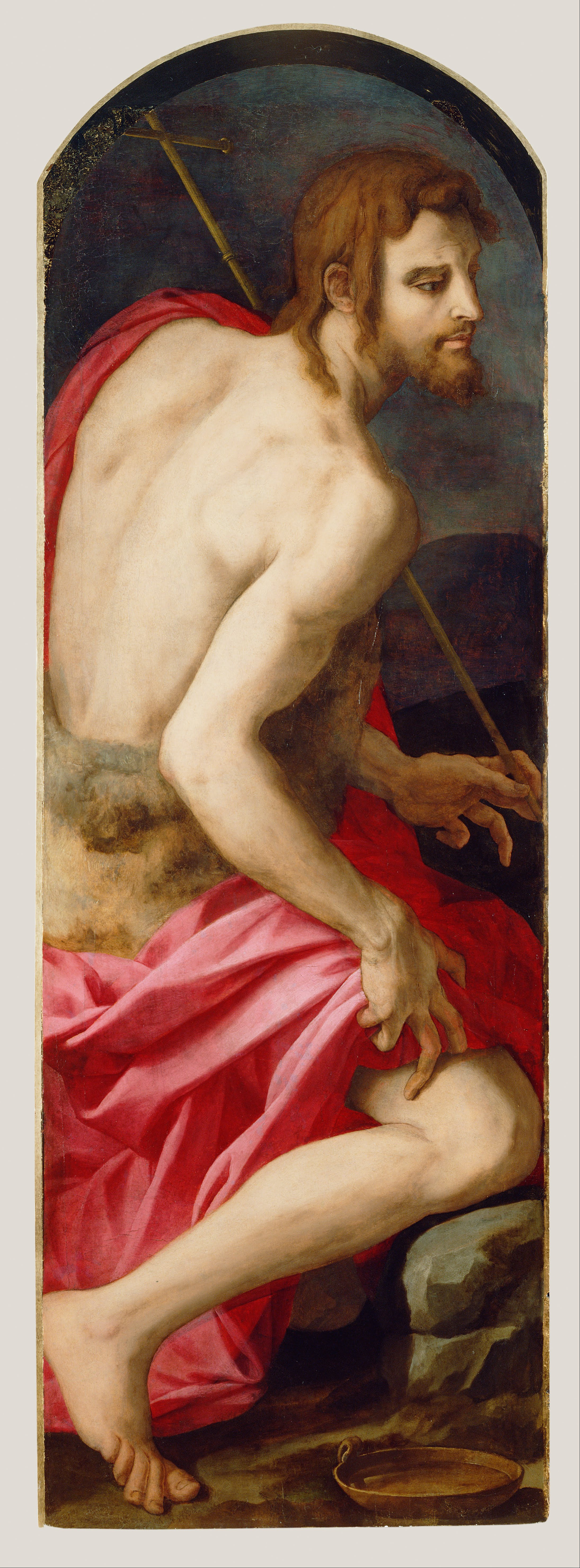
Bronzino. St John the Baptist. c. 1542–45. Getty Center.

To accompany the original altarpiece, Bronzino painted side panels depicting John the Baptist (the patron saint of Florence) on the left and Saint Cosmas (a patron saint of the Medici family and Cosimo's name-saint) on the right. Their inclusion in Eleonora's chapel was as much a political statement as a religious one and these panels may have been portraits of Giovanni dalle Bande Nere (Cosimo's father) as John the Baptist and Cosimo as Saint Cosmas. At some point between 1545 and 1553, Eleonora requested that Bronzino replace the side panels of the saints with more pious panels depicting the Annunciation. This must have been a low priority because the new altar wings were not completed until 1564, two years after Eleonora's death. The Annunciation panels can be viewed in Eleonora's chapel today.

By 1553, the side panels of the saints were in storage. They were last recorded as being in the Medici inventory in 1609 and both were considered lost until the John the Baptist panel resurfaced in 1951. It is now housed in the Getty Center. A fragment purportedly of the Saint Cosmas panel has recently been rediscovered, but it is suspected to be a forgery associated with art dealer Giulano Ruffini.

== Composition ==
In the center foreground is a Pietà portraying the body of Jesus being cradled in his mother Mary's arms. The Apostle John supports his back and is modeled on a youth holding up the body of Christ in a Deposition painted by Bronzino's teacher, Pontormo. Mary Magdalene kneels on the right and supports the feet of Jesus. Her jar of ointment is shown in the far right foreground.

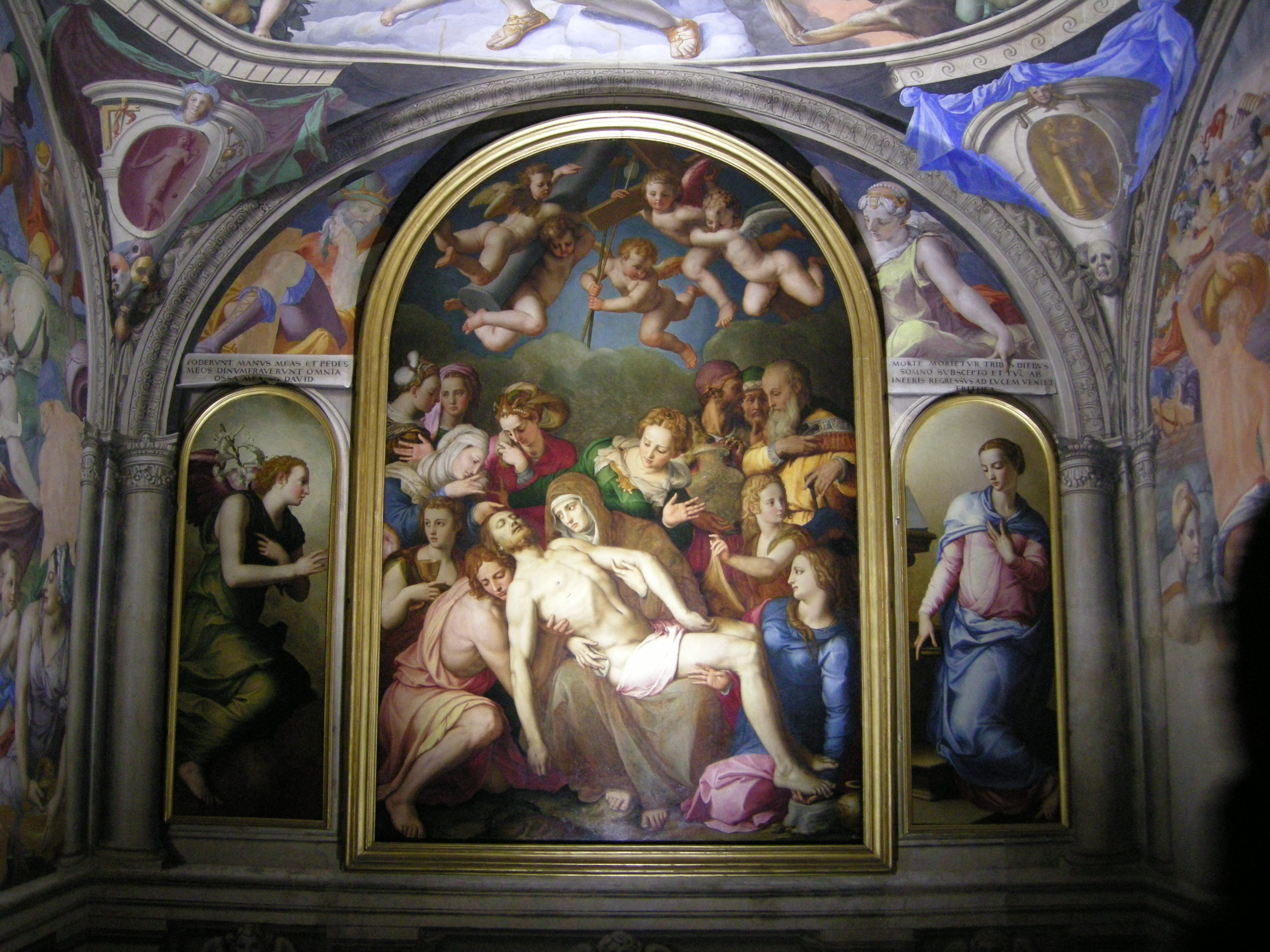
Altar wall of Eleonora's Chapel showing the second version of the Deposition, side panels of the Annunciation, and frescoes.

Four holy women mourn on the left and another dressed in green peers over the Virgin's shoulder and stands out prominently because of her hand gesture and location in the center of the panel. Scholars believe this highlighted woman is one of the three Marys, Mary of Clopas. Two of the three men in the background are named in the Gospel of John as the followers who took Jesus down from the cross and prepared his body for burial. Nicodemus is depicted on the left holding a large ewer filled with embalming spices. On the right, Joseph of Arimathea holds the nails of the Crucifixion as well as the pincers used to remove them. The man between them is an unnamed companion.

In addition to the nails held by Joseph, other Arma Christi (instruments of the Passion) are presented throughout the painting. The angels floating above the scene hold the column where Jesus was whipped, the sponge, the lance, and the cross. The crown of thorns is laying in the dirt at John's feet.

The principal figures are attended by two angels, one bearing a chalice and the other lifting a transparent veil. Both of these objects are symbols of the Eucharist. The viewer can best appreciate the sacramental nature of the work by considering its original setting. The two angels are gazing out of the panel towards the sides. In Eleonora's chapel, they would appear to be looking at the frescoes of the story of Moses on the adjacent walls. In particular, the angel on the left would be gazing at a fresco of Moses Striking the Rock and the Gathering of the Manna. The manna and the water pouring from the rock presage the bread and wine used in the Eucharist.

Bronzino's second version, in general, is an accurate copy of the first. The most obvious deviation is the darker, more subdued color. Much of the brilliant blue has been substituted with a drab brown. Toning down the Mannerist lavishness of the original is consistent with the sobriety of the Counter-Reformation and may reflect Eleonora's sensibilities.

== Portraiture ==
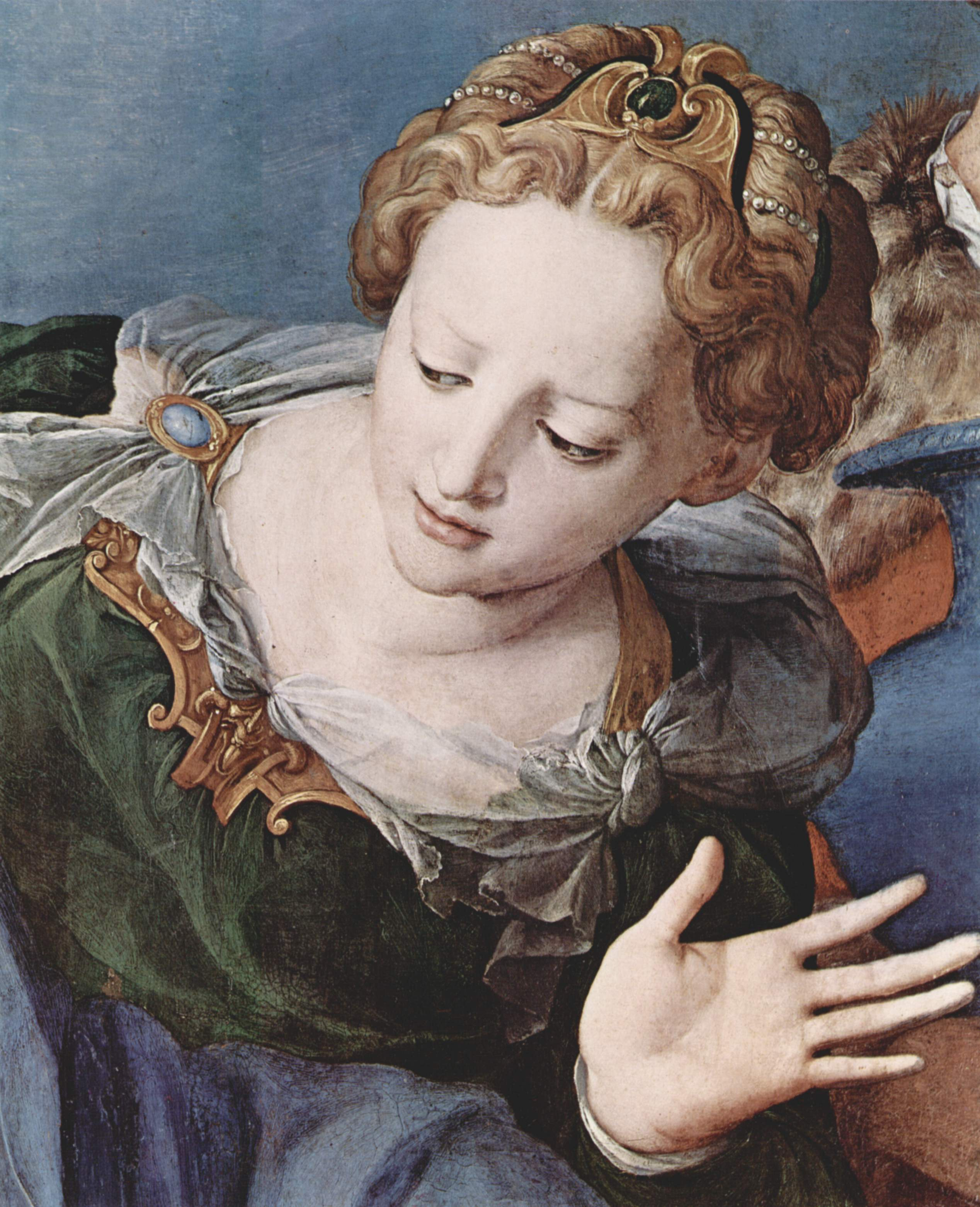
Detail of Eleonora of Toledo as Mary of Clopas from the Deposition of Christ.

In addition to embedding donor portraits and likenesses of themselves in their works, sixteenth-century Florentine artists were known to portray other artisans and associates in their paintings and sculptures. Since neither Bronzino nor his Medici employers documented the existence of embedded portraits in this work, art historians have postulated a number possibilities based on comparisons with other known portraits. Janet Cox-Rearick suggested that the central figure of Mary of Clopas was an idealized portrait of Eleonora herself and that the Virgin Mother was a representation of Cosimo's mother, Maria Salviati. She also proposed that Nicodemus, the unnamed companion, and Joseph of Arimathea were, respectively, portraits of Bronzino (the artist), Pontormo (his teacher), and Baccio Bandinelli (a rival artist who had submitted a modello for the altarpiece). Elizabeth Pilliod has an alternative suggestion: the three companions from left to right are portraits of Giovambattista del Tasso (the architect who created Eleonora's chapel), Francesco di Ser Jacopo (a financial administrator for Cosimo), and Niccolò Tribolo (another artist in the service of the Medici).

== See also ==
- Crossing of the Red Sea
- Paintings in Besançon Cathedral
