= Francesco Bacchiacca =

Italian painter

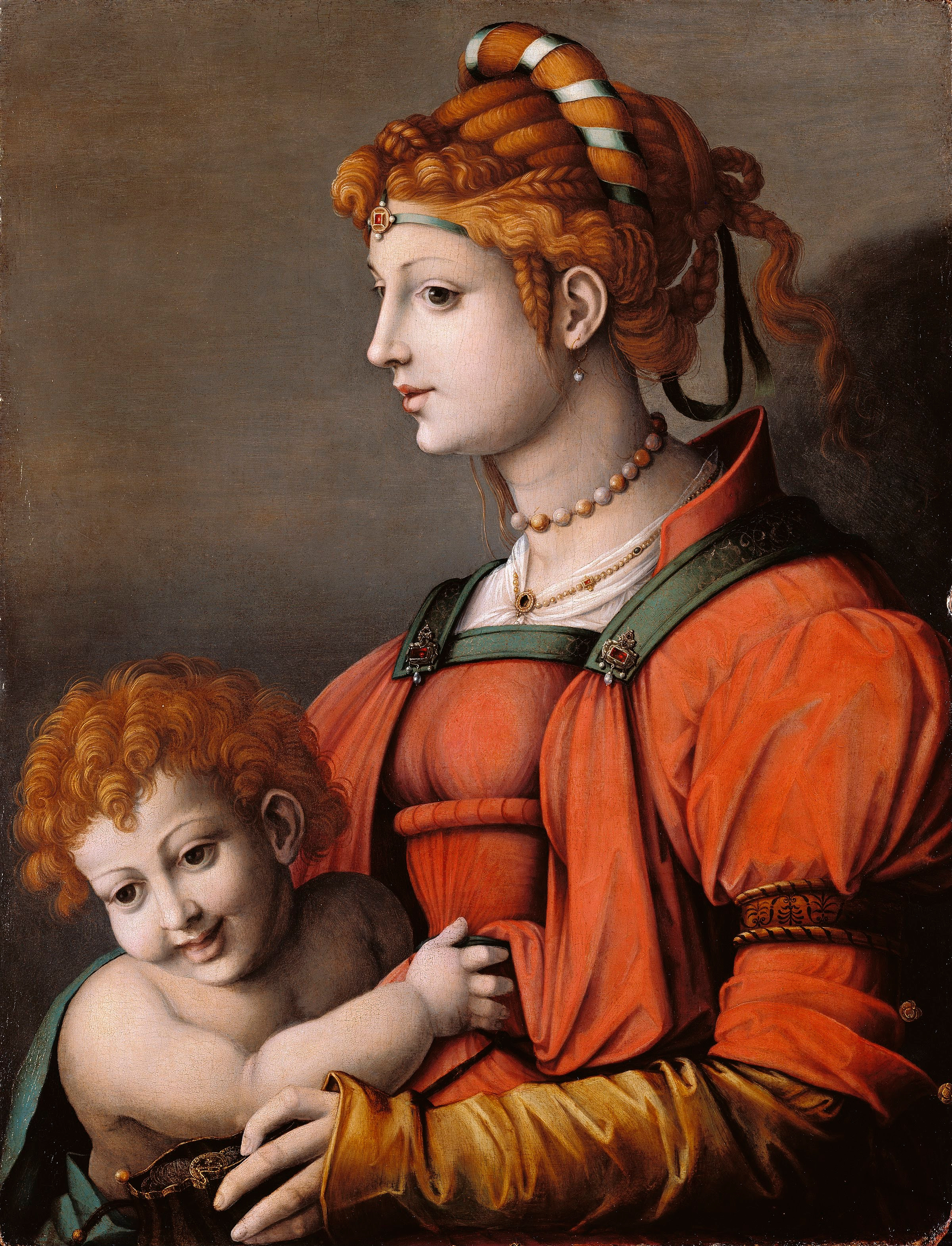
Portrait of a Woman and Child (Allegory of Liberality)

Francesco d'Ubertino Verdi, called Bachiacca (say "bah ki ah cka"). He is also known as Francesco Ubertini, il Bacchiacca (1494–1557). He was an Italian painter of the Renaissance whose work is characteristic of the Florentine Mannerist style.

== Life ==
Bachiacca was born and baptized in Florence on 1 March 1494 and died there on 5 October 1557.

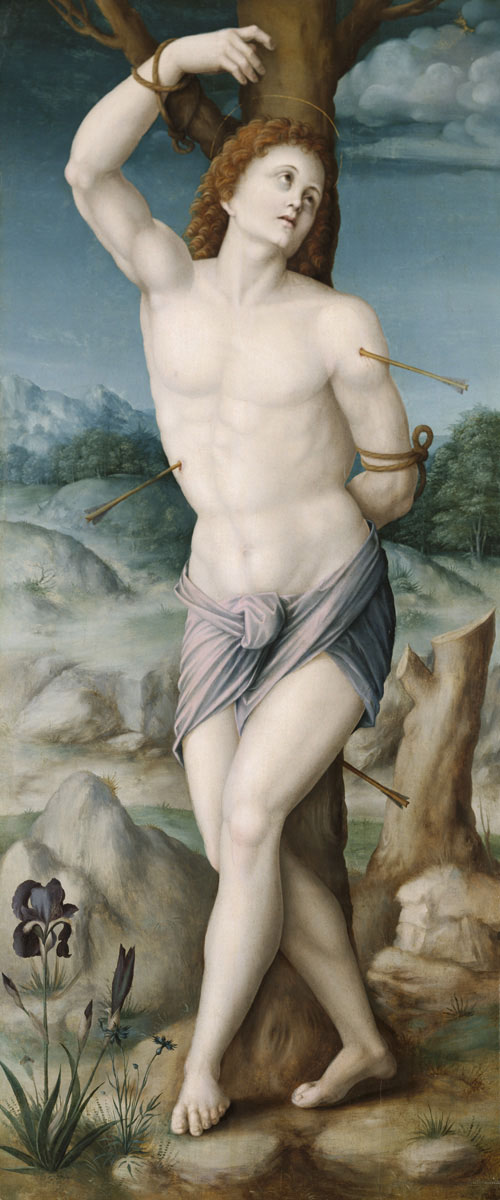
Saint Sebastian

Bachiacca belonged to a family of at least five, and possibly as many as eight artists. His father Ubertino di Bartolomeo (c. 1446/7-1505) was a goldsmith, his older brother Bartolomeo d'Ubertino Verdi (aka Baccio 1484-c. 1526/9) was a painter, and his younger brother Antonio d'Ubertino Verdi (1499–1572)—who also called himself Bachiacca—was both an embroiderer and painter. Francesco's son Carlo di Francesco Verdi (-1569) painted and Antonio's son Bartolomeo d'Antonio Verdi (aka Baccino -1600) worked as an embroiderer. This latter generation probably continued to produce paintings and embroideries after Bachiacca's death and until the Verdi family extinguished about the year 1600.

Bachiacca was apprenticed in Perugino's Florentine studio, and by 1515 began to collaborate with Andrea del Sarto, Jacopo Pontormo and Francesco Granacci on the decoration of cassone (chest), spalliera (wainscot), and other painted furnishings for the bedroom of Pierfrancesco Borgherini and Margherita Acciauoli. In 1523, he again participated with Andrea del Sarto, Franciabigio and Pontormo in the decoration of the antechamber of Giovanni Benintendi. While he established a reputation as a painter of predellas and small cabinet pictures, he eventually expanded his output to include large altarpieces, such as the Beheading of St. John the Baptist, now in Berlin.

In 1540, Bachiacca became an artist at the court of Duke Cosimo I de' Medici (reg. 1537-1574) and Duchess Eleanor of Toledo. In this capacity, Bachiacca was a colleague and peer of the most important Florentine artists of the age, including Pontormo, Bronzino, Francesco Salviati, Tribolo, Benvenuto Cellini, Baccio Bandinelli, and his in-law, the sculptor Giovanni Battista del Tasso.

Bachiacca's first major commission was to paint the walls and ceiling of the duke's private study with plants, animals and a landscape, which remain an important testimony of Cosimo's interest in botany and the natural sciences.

== Work ==
Only one signed work by Francesco is known, the decoration of a Terrace for the duchess and her children, with his abbreviated Christian name and nickname: "FRANC. BACHI. FACI." His works typically contain carefully observed illustrations of nature. The artist's trademark method and style consists of the combination of figures, exotic costumes and other motifs acquired from Italian artists and German and Netherlandish prints into entirely new compositions. These cosmopolitan assemblages exhibited the most praiseworthy elements of both Flemish and Italian Renaissance art, which appealed to his courtly clientele.

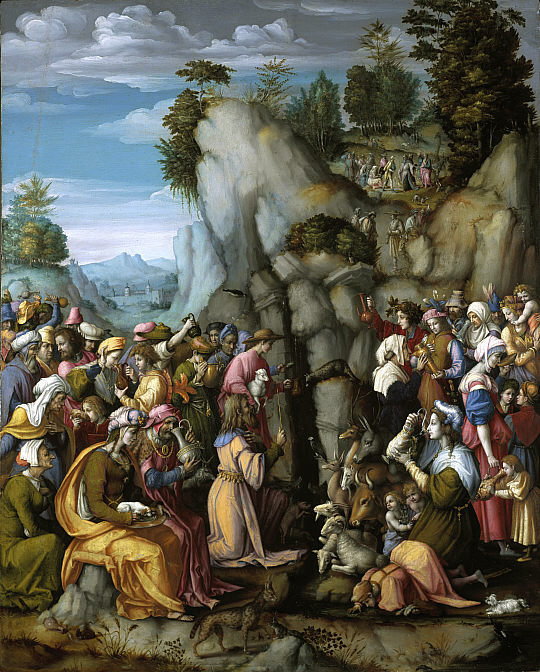
Moses Striking the Rock

Bachiacca also made cartoons for two series of tapestries, the Grotesque Spalliere (1545–49) and the Months (1550–1553), which were woven by the newly founded Medici tapestry works.

As a court painter, Bachiacca created Saint Sebastian during the 1530s-1540s, on the subject of the death of Saint Sebastian, a Christian nobleman condemned to death by the Roman emperor Diocletian. Originally it was surmised that the panel could have functioned as a section to an altarpiece.

== Works ==
His works include:

- Madonna and Child at the Metropolitan Museum of Art New York, early 1520s. This painting was used as a 2018 Christmas stamp by the United States Postal Service.
- Predella with the Life of St. Achatius, and the Ten Thousand Martyrs,1521 at the Uffizi Gallery online
- Portrait of a Young Lute Player, 1524-25, New Orleans Museum of Art
- Ghismonda with Heart of Guiscardo, 1520s, Lowe Art Museum, University of Miami, Also here, and Verso and Recto
- Madonna and Child with St. John, c. 1525, Dallas Museum of Art
- Saint Sebastian, c. 1530s-1540s, Birmingham Museum of Art
- The Gathering of Manna, c. 1540/1555, National Gallery of Art, Washington D.C.
- Deposition c. 1518 at the Web Gallery of Art
- Conversion of Saint Paul 1530-1535 at the Memorial Art Gallery, Rochester, New York

== Gallery ==
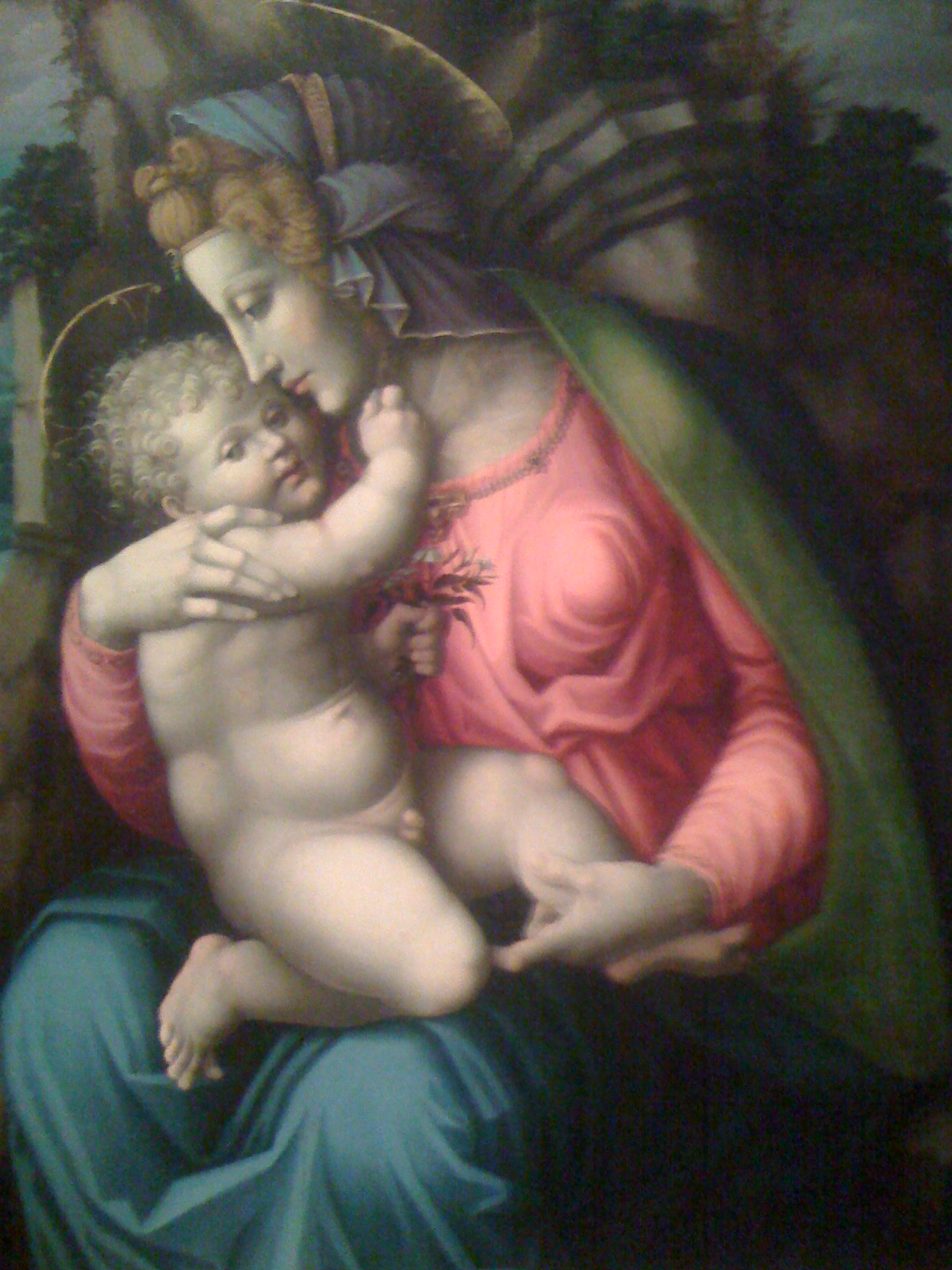
Madonna and Child in a Landscape

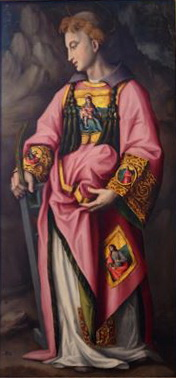
St. Lawrence

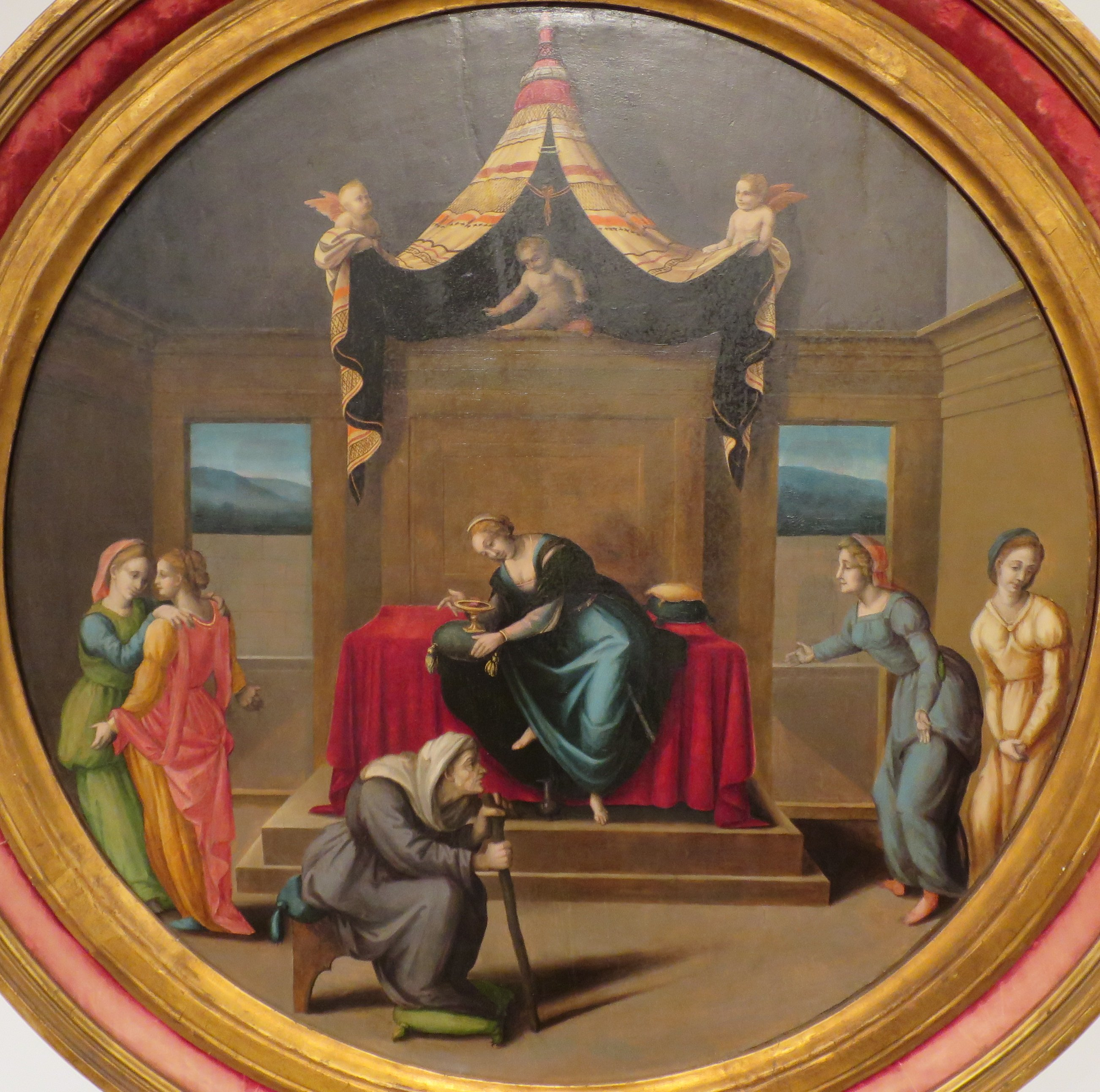
Ghismonda with Heart of Guiscardo

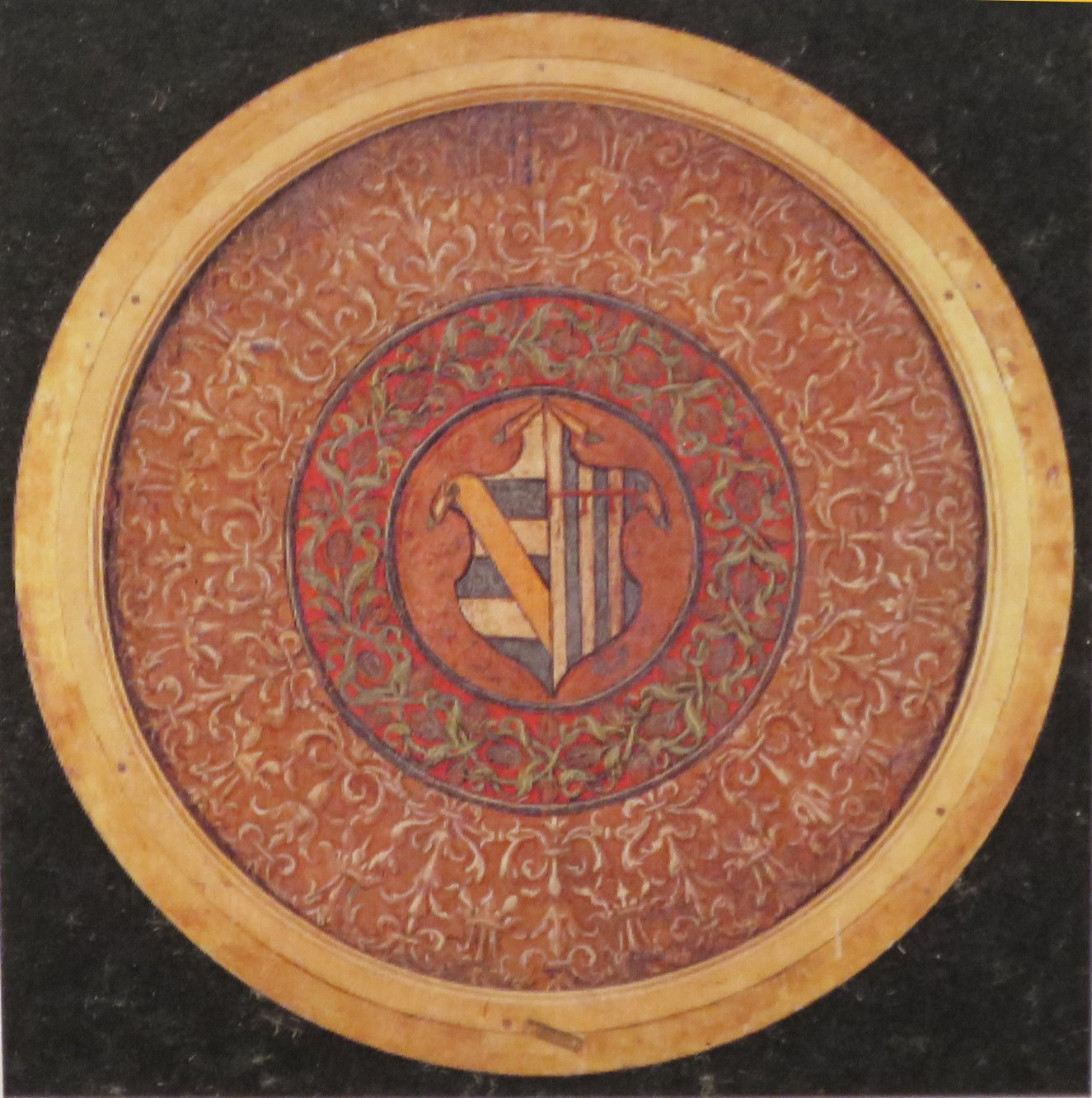
Ghismonda, reverse

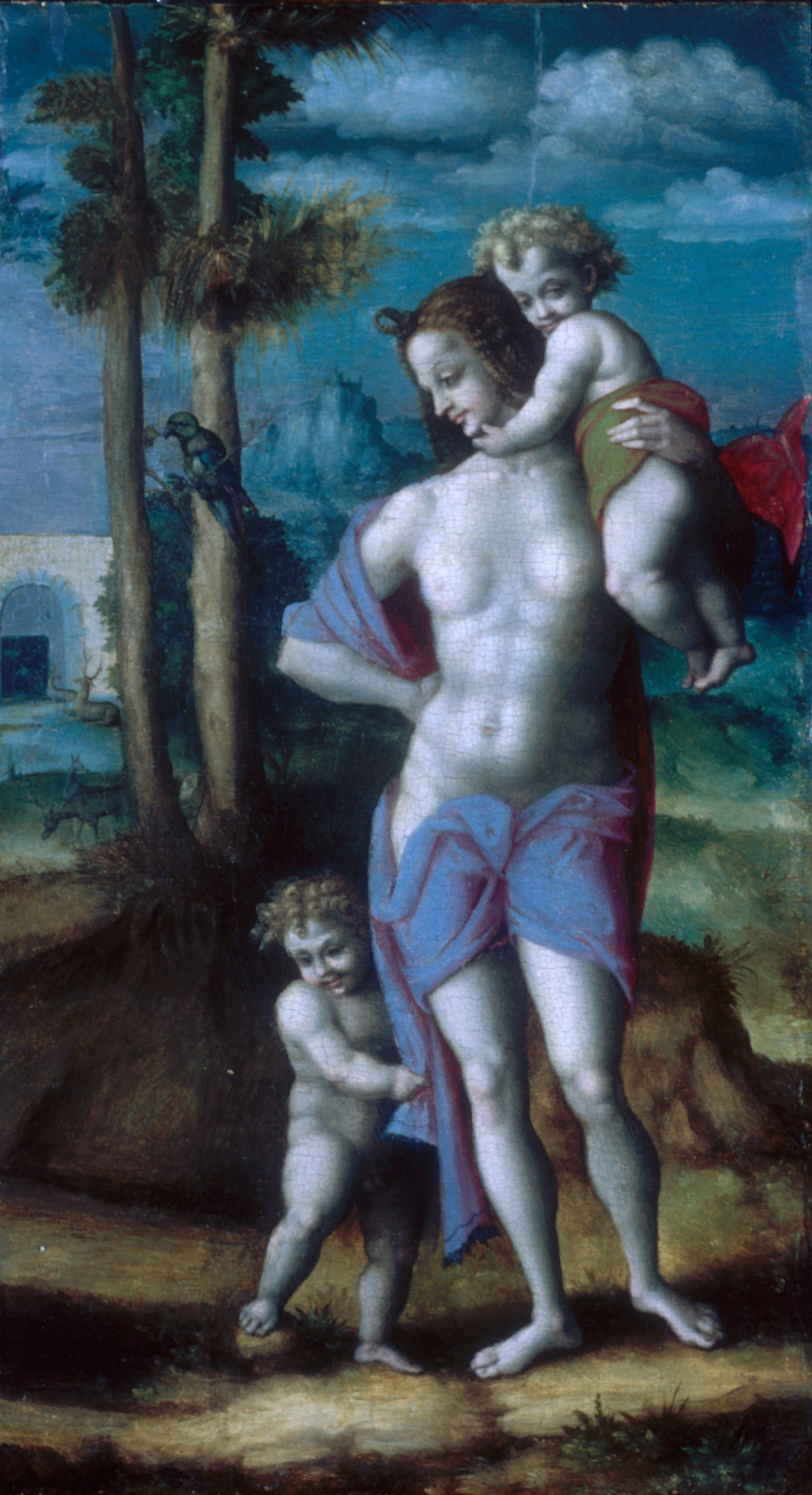
Eve with Cain and Abel

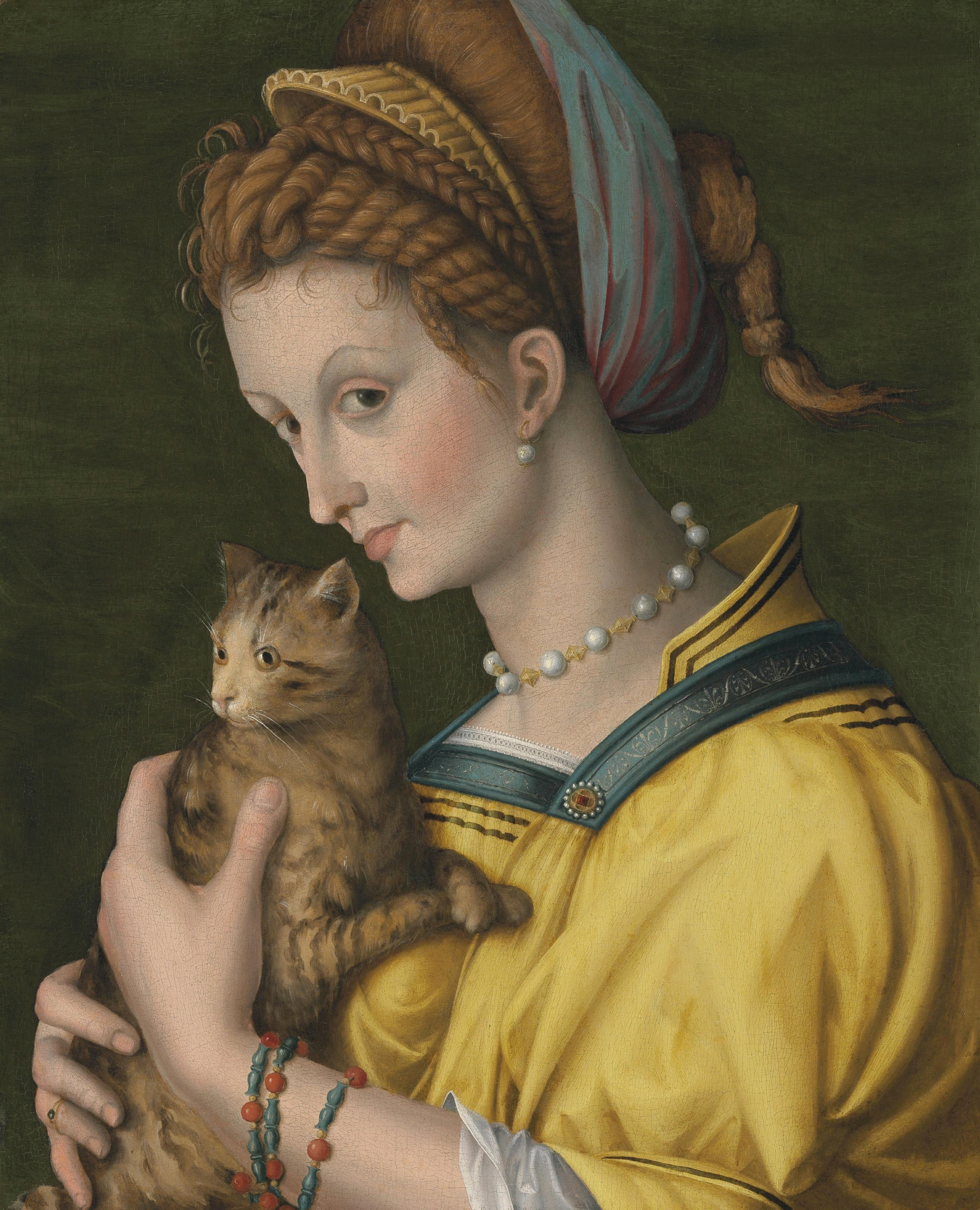
Portrait of a young lady holding a cat

== Sources ==
- La France, Robert G. (2008). Bachiacca: Artist of the Medici Court. Leo S. Olschki.
- Freedberg, Sydney J. (1993). Pelican History of Art (ed.). Painting in Italy, 1500-1600. Penguin Books. p. 240.
