= Drunkenness of Noah =

1515 painting by Giovanni Bellini

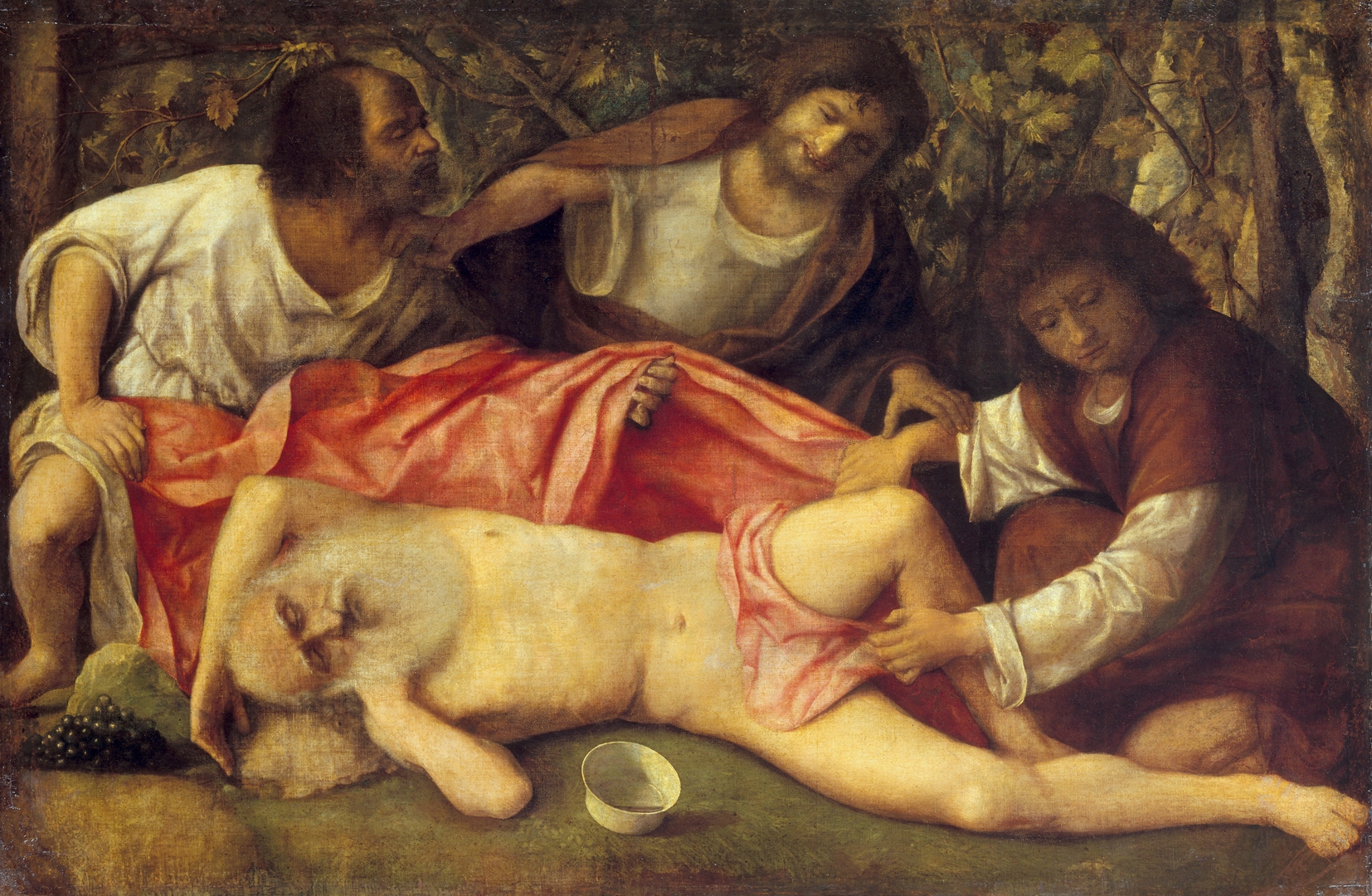
- Artist: Giovanni Bellini
- Year: about 1515
- Medium: Oil on canvas
- Dimensions: 103 cm × 157 cm (41 in × 62 in)
- Location: Musée des Beaux-Arts; Besançon

Drunkenness of Noah is a painting by the Italian artist Giovanni Bellini. It was finished about 1515. It is kept in the Museum of Fine Arts and Archeology of Besançon, France.

== Composition ==
Noah is sleeping naked. The cup and the bunches of grapes next to him, and the vineyard in the background, suggest that Noah is drunk. Three of his sons are represented at his side. Shem and Japhet (left and right) avert their eyes and cover their father with a red cloth. But Ham, the third son, laughs when he see his father.

== Origins ==
The work refers to Genesis 9:20–23

20 In those days Noah became a farmer, and he made a vine-garden. 21 And he took of the wine of it and was overcome by drink; and he was uncovered in his tent. 22 And Ham, the father of Canaan, saw his father unclothed, and gave news of it to his two brothers outside. 23 And Shem and Japheth took a robe, and putting it on their backs went in with their faces turned away, and put it over their father so that they might not see him unclothed.

== See also ==
- List of works by Giovanni Bellini
