= Killing a Deer =

Painting by Gustave Courbet

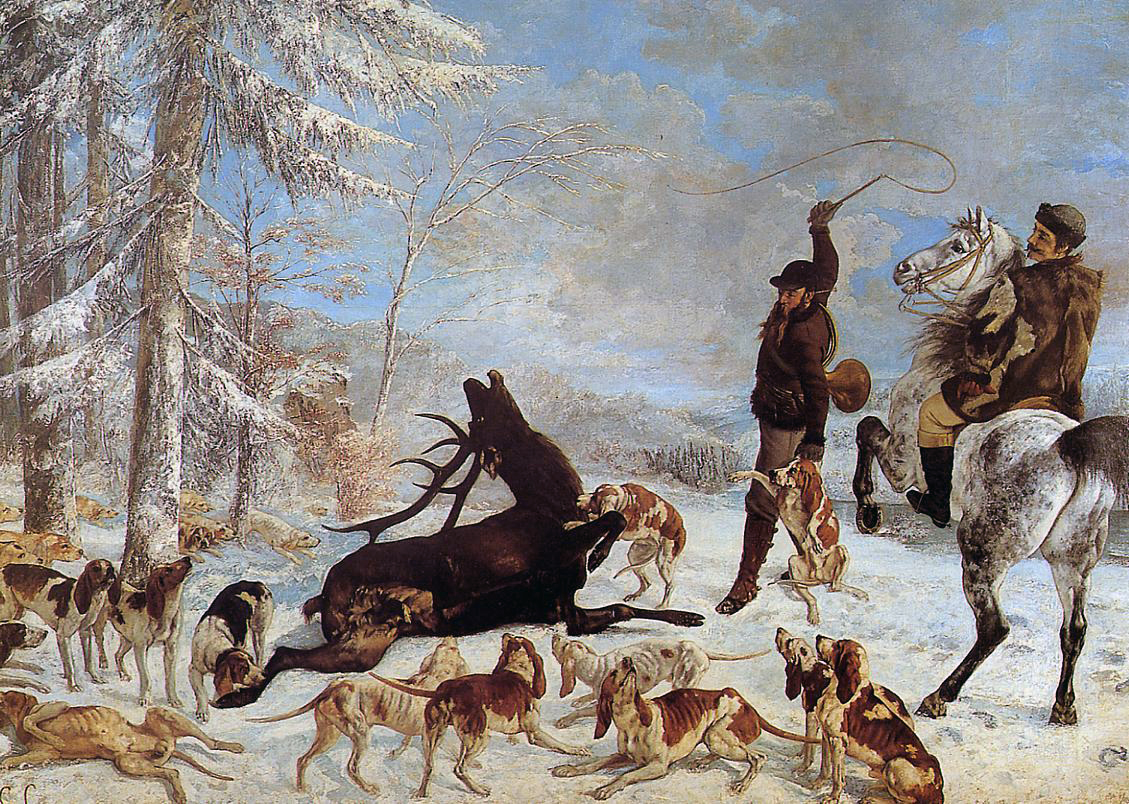
- Artist: Gustave Courbet
- Year: c. 1867
- Medium: Oil on canvas
- Dimensions: 355 cm × 505 cm (140 in × 199 in)
- Location: Museum of Fine Arts of Besançon, Besançon

Killing a Deer or A Deer Hunt – The Kill (French: L'Hallali du cerf) is a very large painting (355 by 505 cm) representing a hunting scene, completed in 1867 by the French Realist painter Gustave Courbet. The picture is currently on display in the Musée des Beaux-Arts et d'Archéologie of Besançon.

== History ==
The painting was done during the winter of 1866–1867. It is in the large format newly adopted by Courbet, as also in A Burial at Ornans and The Artist's Studio. The work was exhibited at the French art salons and academies of 1869. The picture caused some scandal, major formats being previously reserved for noble history paintings rather than hunting scenes.

== Iconography ==
The scene shows a deer attacked by a pack of hunting dogs, collapsed on the snowy ground. Two characters are on the right. The huntsman on foot is Cusenier Jules, a resident of Ornans, while the man on horseback is Felix Gaudy, of Vuillafans. L'Hallali is in the tradition of representation of the scene hunt, from the seventeenth century. Courbet uses a harsh realistic representation closer to Flemish models. Hunting scenes are common in the paintings of Courbet; every step of the chase is represented.

== Influences ==
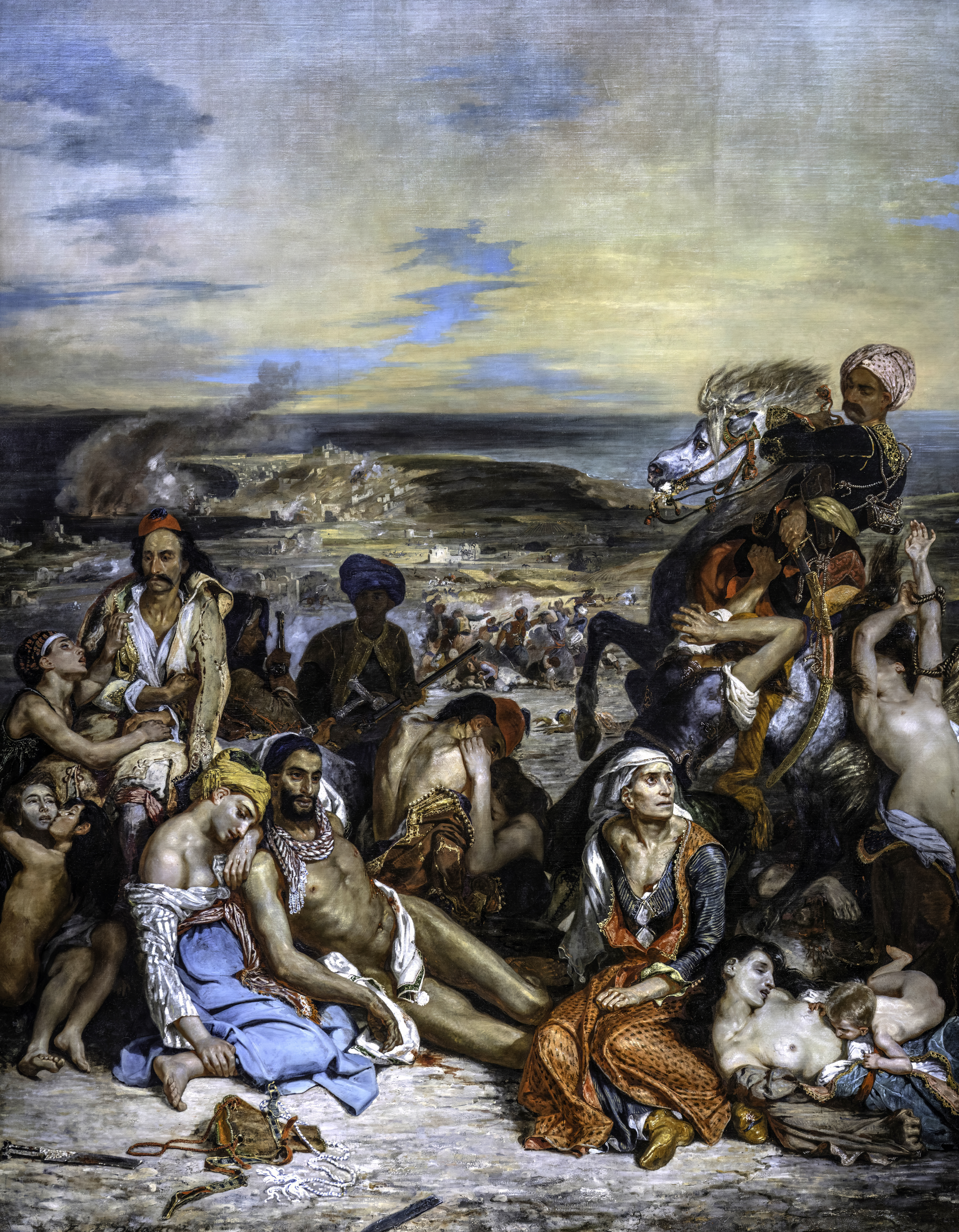
The Massacre at Chios by Eugène Delacroix in Louvre.

There is another influence in this painting, that of The Massacre at Chios (1824) by Eugène Delacroix (illustrated). His influence is reflected particularly through the mounted character.
