= Portrait of Adèle Besson =

Painting by Pierre-Auguste Renoir

Portrait of Adele Besson
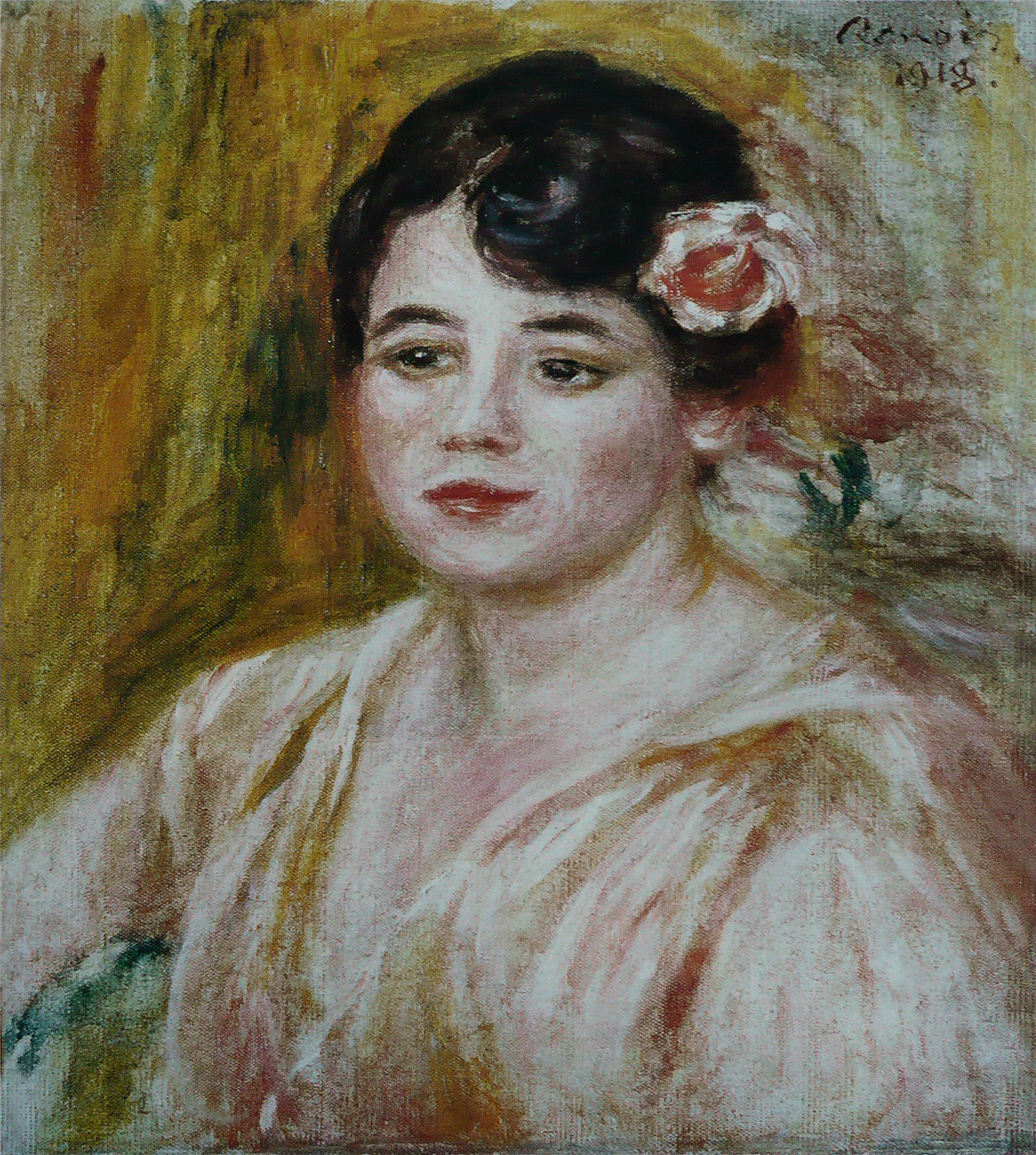
- Artist: Auguste Renoir
- Year: c. 1918
- Medium: Oil on canvas
- Dimensions: 41 cm × 36.8 cm (16 in × 14.5 in)
- Location: Museum of Fine Arts; Besançon

The Portrait of Adèle Besson is a 1918 oil painting in the Post-Impressionist style made by Auguste Renoir, depicting the wife of George Besson. The painting represents Renoir's late work period (1892–1919).

The couple gave a large bequest to the Museum of Fine Arts in Besançon (France). Their collection consisted of works of contemporary art (early 20th century). The installation of the collection at the Museum caused the expansion of the museum building, including the construction of the central staircase by Louis Miquel (student of Le Corbusier). This picture is part of their bequest.

== See also ==
- List of paintings by Pierre-Auguste Renoir
- 1918 in art
