= George Besson =

French art critic

George Besson (25 December 1882 – 19 June 1971) was a French art critic, and the founder and director of Cahiers d'Aujourd'hui. His wife Adèle was the subject of Pierre-Auguste Renoir's Portrait of Adèle Besson, and he was the subject of Pierre Bonnard's Portrait de George Besson., amongst other pieces.

In 1971 the Bessons donated their art collection to the French state, the musée de Besançon and the musée Albert-André in Bagnols-sur-Cèze.
