= Musée des Beaux-Arts et d'Archéologie de Besançon =

Museum of Fine Arts and Archeology in Besançon, France

Coordinates: 47.2402°N 6.0231°E

Museum of Fine Arts and Archeology of Besançon
- Musée des Beaux-Arts et d'Archéologie de Besançon
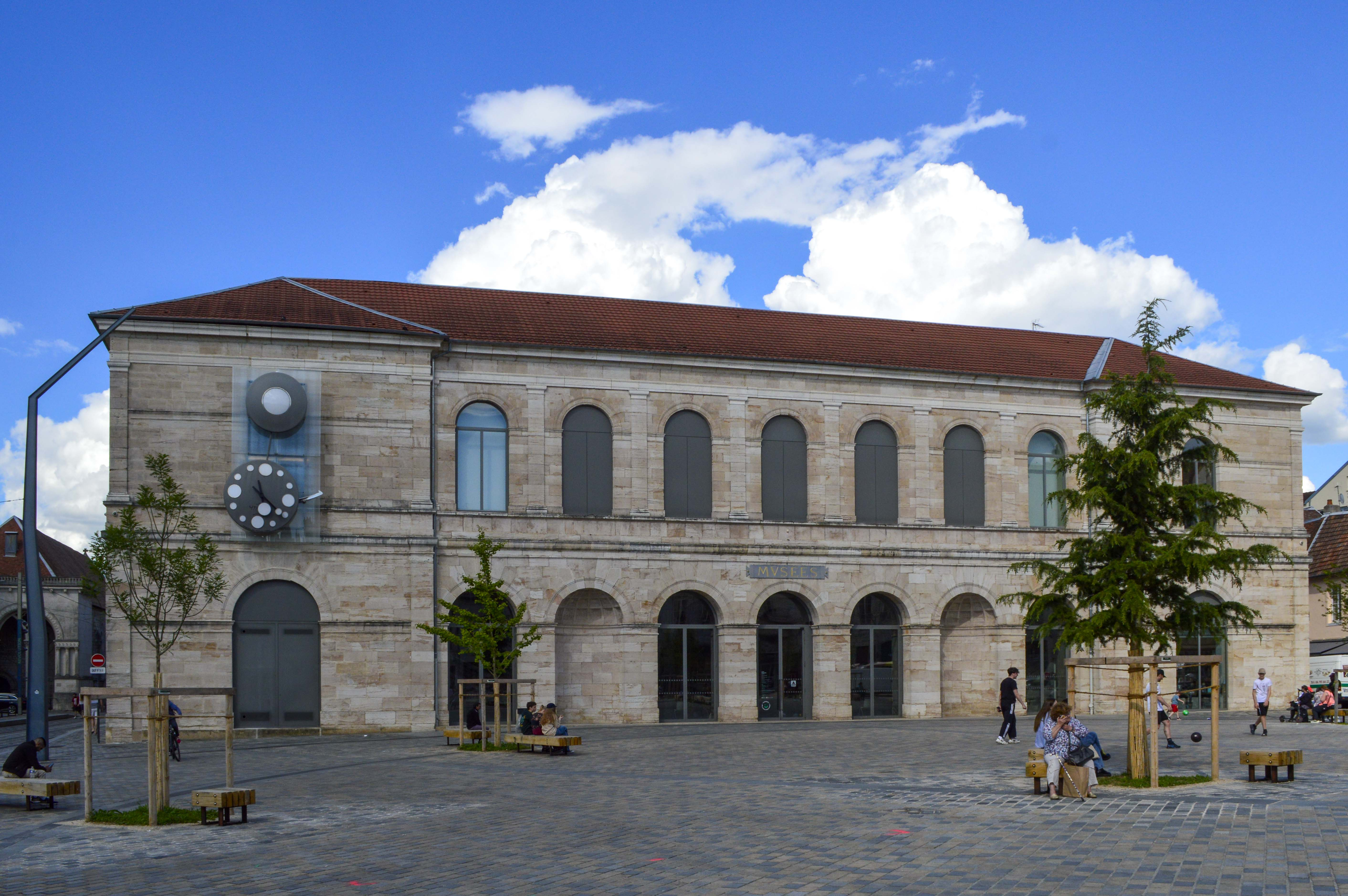
- Location: Besançon, France
- Visitors: 105,459 (2019)
- Website: www.mbaa.besancon.fr

The musée des Beaux-Arts et d'Archéologie (Museum of Fine Arts and Archeology) in the French city of Besançon is the oldest public museum in France. It was set up in 1694, nearly a century before the Louvre became a public museum.

Reorganized from 1967 to 1970 by Louis Miquel, a pupil of Le Corbusier, the museum is again the subject of a total renovation and an enlargement from October 2015. Three years later, the completely renovated museum was inaugurated on November 16, 2018 in the presence of the President of the Republic Emmanuel Macron, the Minister of Culture Franck Riester and the Mayor Jean-Louis Fousseret. Attendance is then on the rise with 105,459 visitors recorded at the end of 2019.

== Collections ==
The collections of the musée des Beaux-Arts et d'Archéologie de Besançon are divided in three categories: archaeology, painting, and drawing cabinet.

=== Archaeology ===
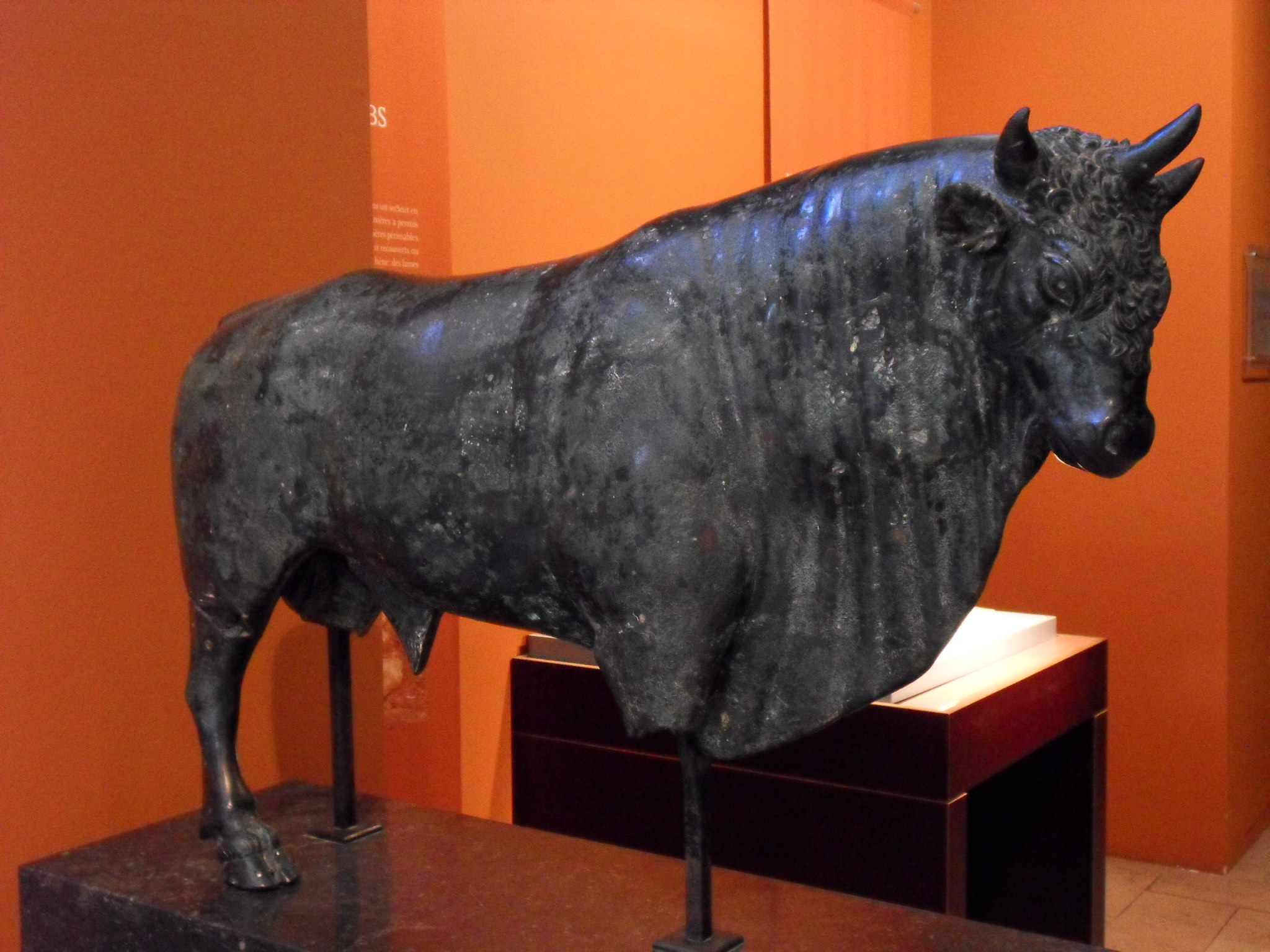
Three-horned bull called the "Bull of Avrigney." Discovered in 1756. An example of Gallo-Roman religious art

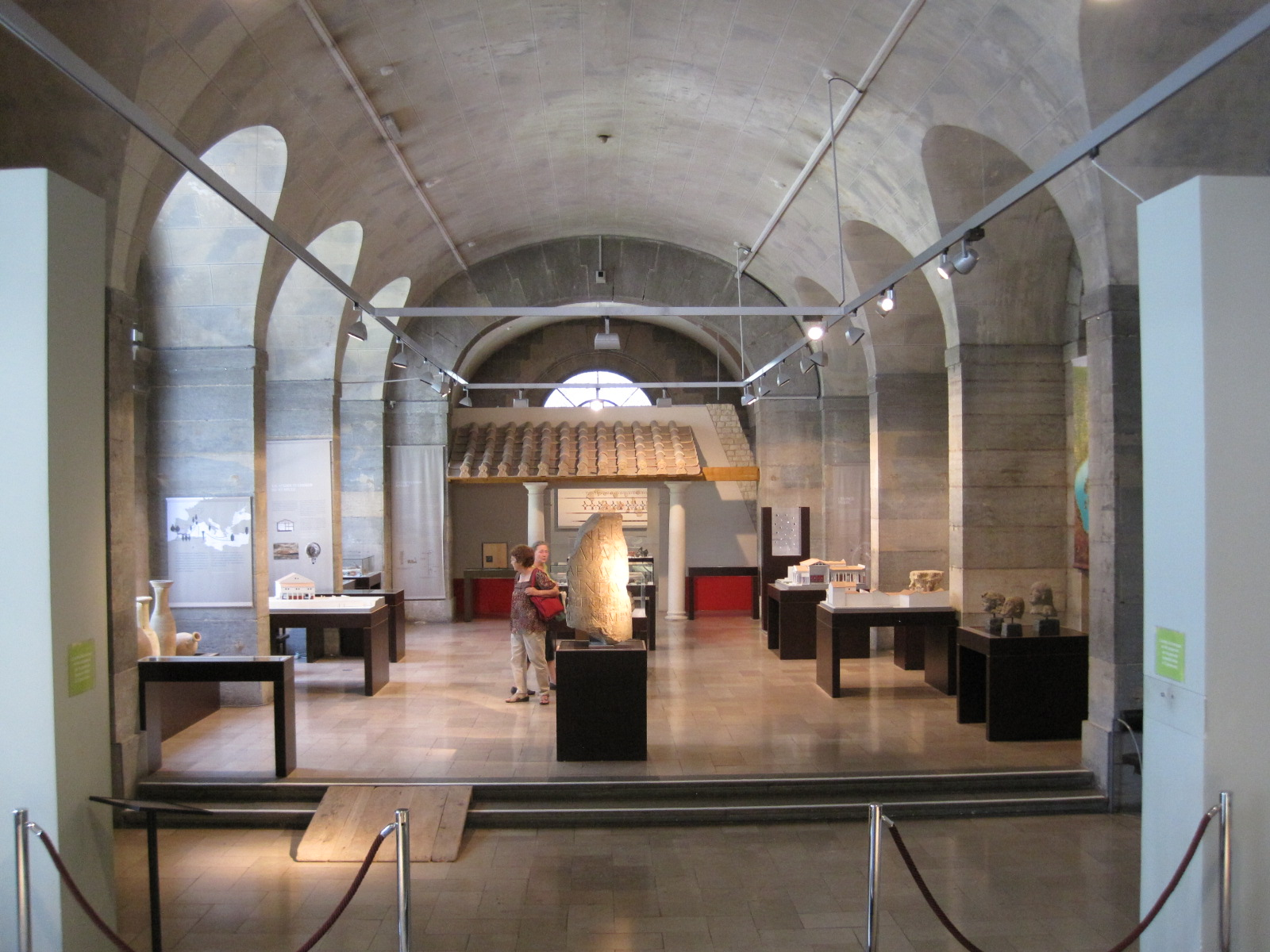
Roman art gallery.

- The Egyptian collection includes the mummies of Seramon, a royal scribe who lived in the end of the 21st Dynasty, and of Ankhpakhered, Amon's artist and son of a priest of the 26th Dynasty but also a series of statuettes representing gods, ushabtis, etc.
- An important prehistoric collection includes objects of the Neolithic, Bronze Age and Iron Age.
- The most important archaeology collection belongs to the Gallo-Roman period. It includes mosaics (mosaïque du Neptune and mosaïque de la Méduse found in the domus of the collège Lumière), other objects found during digs in the town, the bronze statue of a bull with three horns from Avrigney, and the bronze statuette called the God of Besançon.
- The medieval collection includes statues, stone sarcophagus and other relics.

=== Drawing cabinet ===
- The musée des Beaux-Arts et d’Archéologie de Besançon is home to one of the largest drawing cabinets of France thanks to its collection of over 5,500 works from European schools dating from the end of the 15th century to the middle of the 20th century. Artists present in the collection include Federico Barocci, Tintoretto, Annibale Carracci and Giovanni Battista Tiepolo for Italian works of the 15th to 18th centuries; Albrecht Dürer, Peter Paul Rubens, Jacob Jordaens and Rembrandt for northern works of the 16th and 17th centuries, and Nicolas Poussin, Eustache Le Sueur, Simon Vouet, François Boucher, Jean-Honoré Fragonard, Hubert Robert, Antoine Watteau, Jacques-Louis David, Théodore Géricault, Eugène Delacroix, Gustave Courbet, Raoul Dufy, Albert Marquet, Henri Matisse and Auguste Rodin for French works from the end of the 16th to the 20th centuries.

=== Paintings ===
The collections shows the main tendencies and evolutions of European art from the 14th to 20th centuries:

- Italy: Filippino Lippi, Giovanni Bellini, Tintoretto, Titian, Dosso Dossi, Lavinia Fontana, Onofrio Palumbo, Giuseppe Recco, Luca Giordano, Elisabetta Sirani, Giovanni Battista Tiepolo and notably Bronzino with his masterpiece: the Deposition of Christ.
- Northern Schools are represented by Lucas Cranach the Elder, Hans Baldung Grien, Jan Brueghel the Elder, Peter Paul Rubens, Jacob Jordaens, Jan Lievens, Jacob van Ruisdael, Aelbert Cuyp, Willem Claesz Heda and Jan van Goyen.
- Spain is represented by Francisco de Zurbarán, Juan de Arellano and Francisco Goya.
- The French collection: paintings by Simon Vouet, Philippe de Champaigne, Eustache Le Sueur, Hubert Robert, Jean-Honoré Fragonard, Donat Nonnotte, Jacques-Louis David, Antoine-Jean Gros, Jean-Auguste-Dominique Ingres, Théodore Géricault, Paul Delaroche, Jean-Léon Gérôme, James Tissot, Édouard Vuillard and also, for the 20th century, Paul Signac, Pierre Bonnard, Félix Vallotton, Auguste Renoir, Henri Matisse, Suzanne Valadon and Albert Marquet. François Boucher and Gustave Courbet are particularly well represented, with multiple chinoiseries by the former and the monumental Killing a Deer by the latter.
- Japan is represented by Kakizaki Hakyo, with eleven original portraits from the Ishūretsuzō.
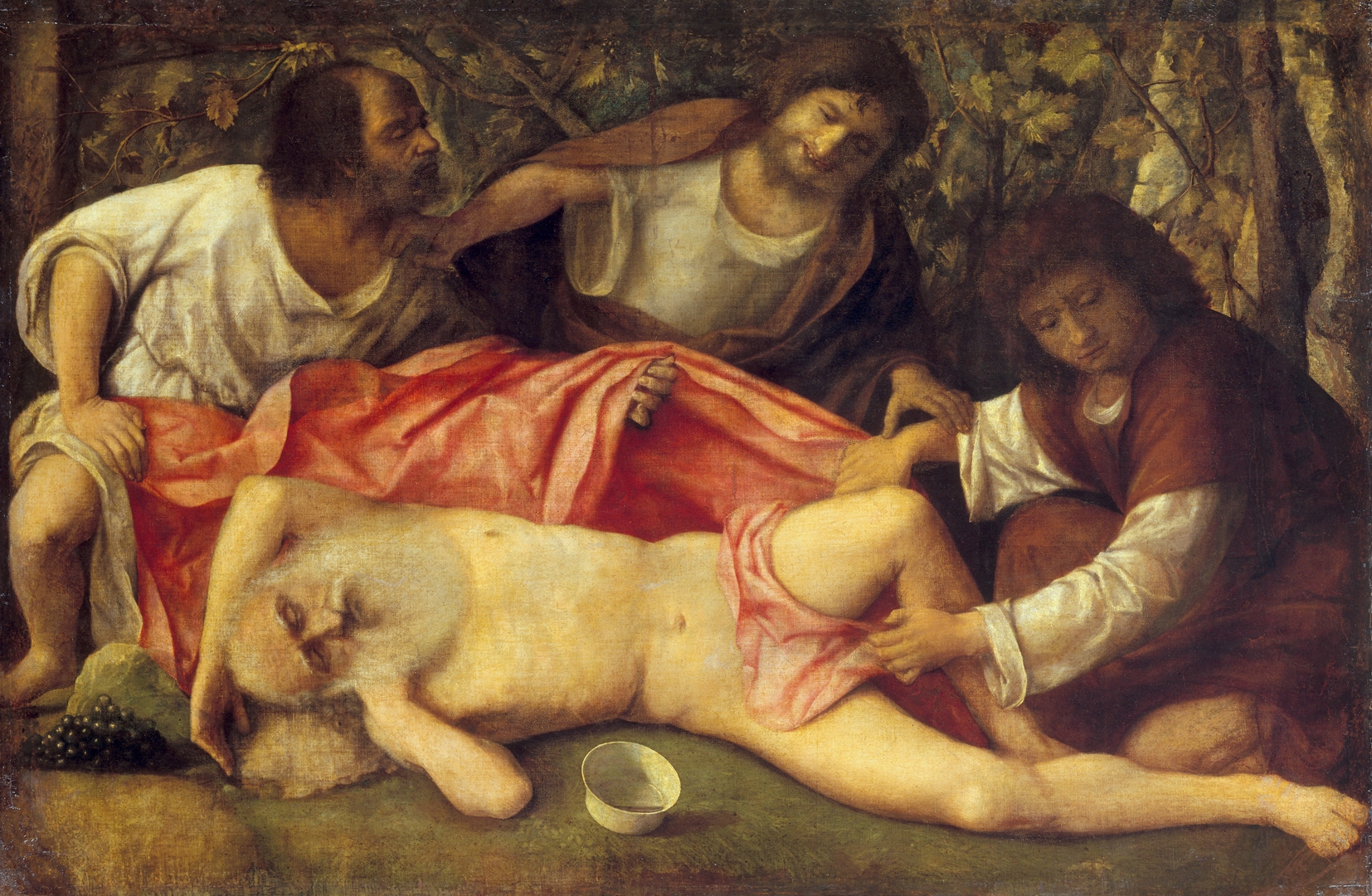
Giovanni Bellini, Drunkenness of Noah, 1515, oil on canvas, 103 × 157 cm.

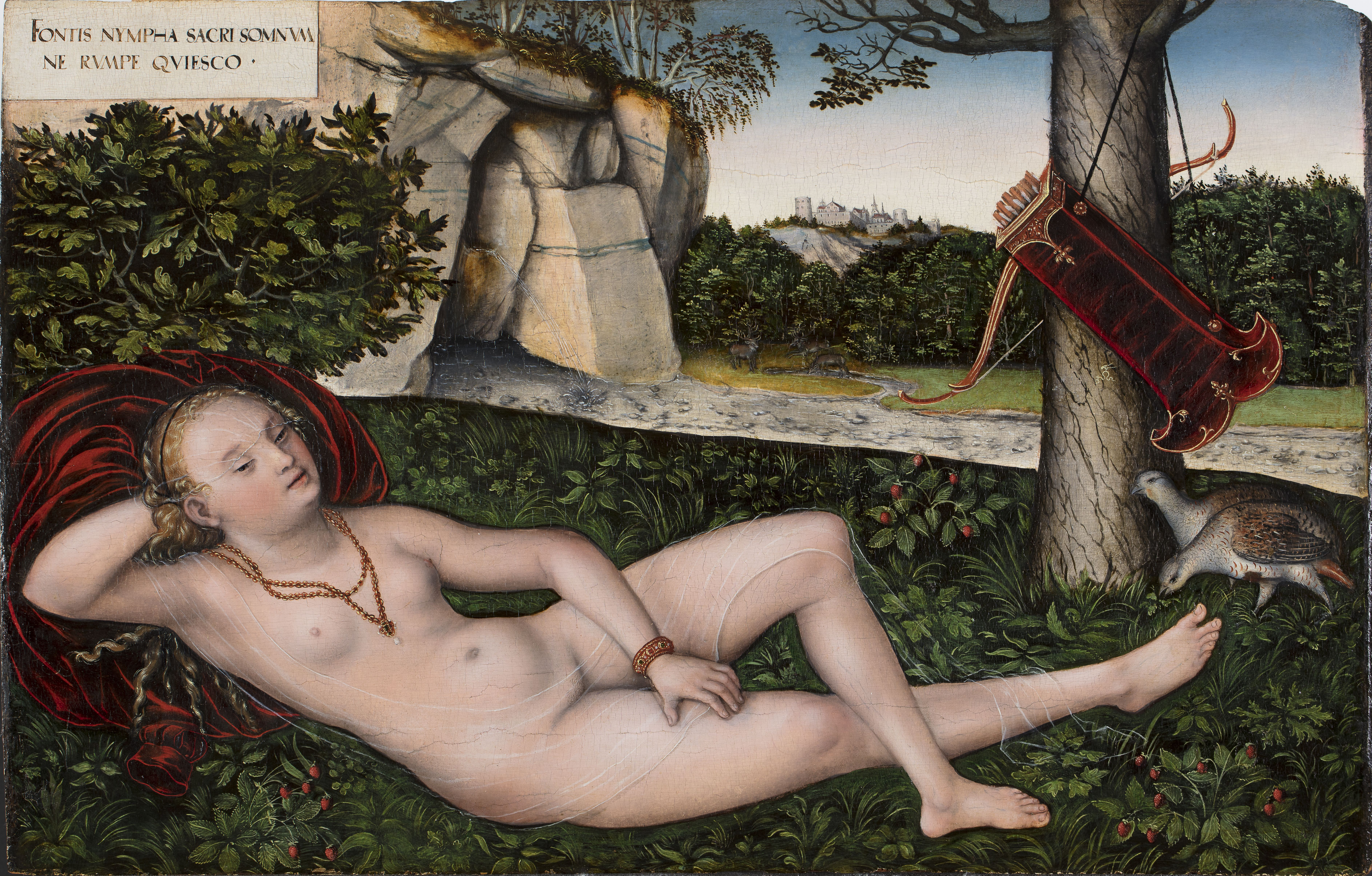
Lucas Cranach the Elder, Nymph at the source, 1537, oil on panel, 48.5 × 74.2 cm.

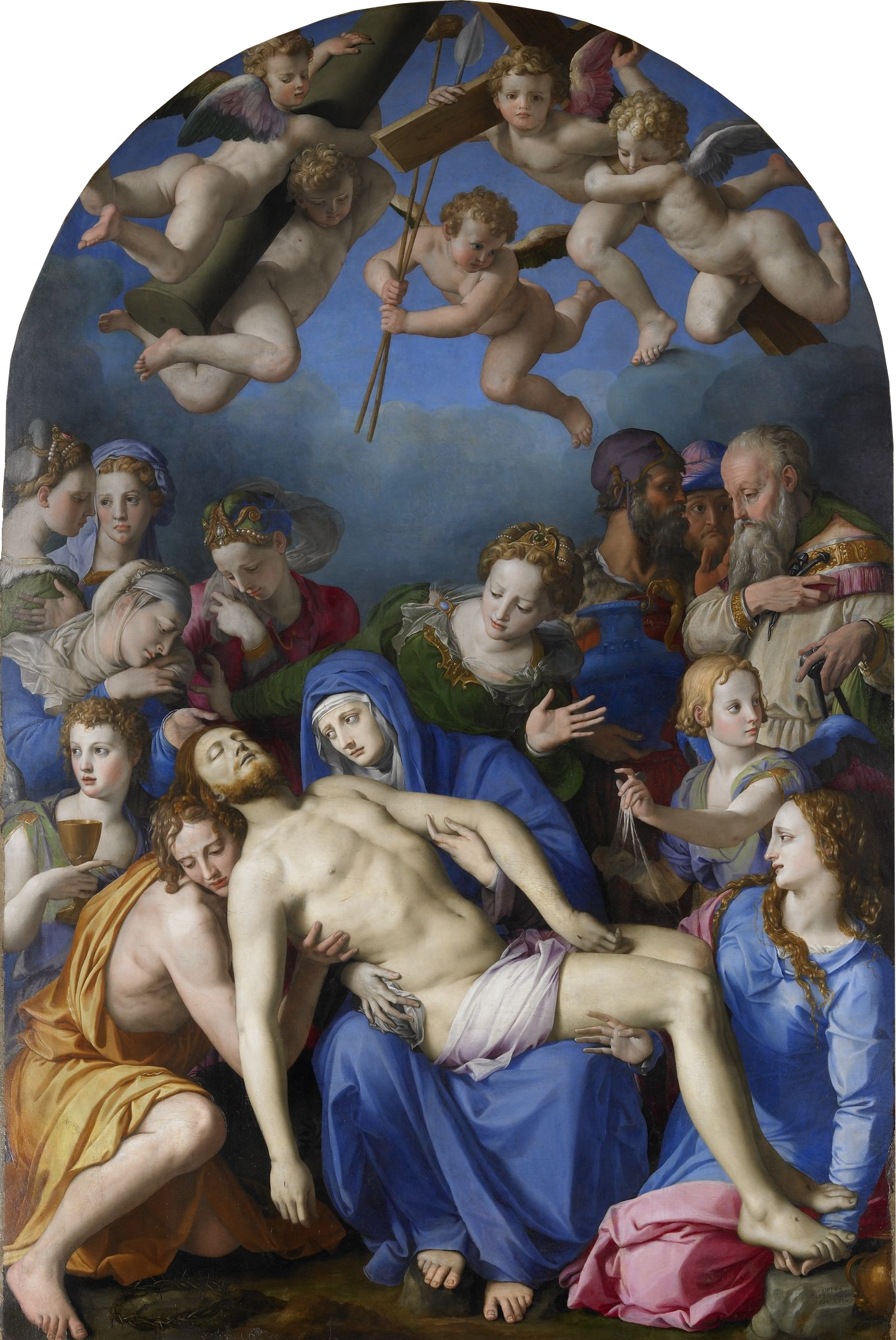
Bronzino, Deposition of Christ, 1540–1545, oil on panel, 268 × 173 cm.

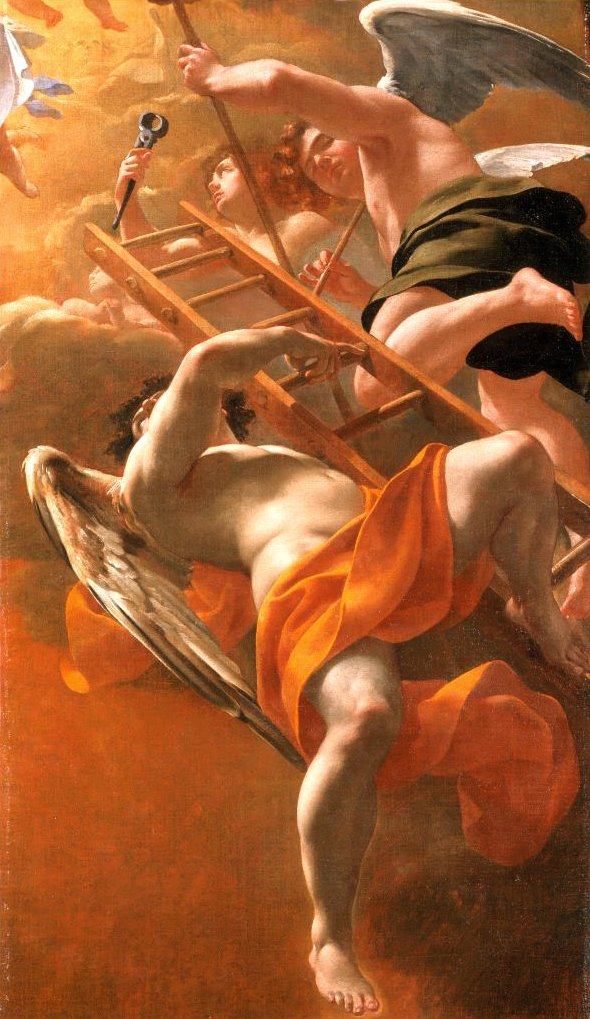
Simon Vouet, Angels bearing the instruments of the Passion, 1626, oil on canvas, 131 × 77 cm.

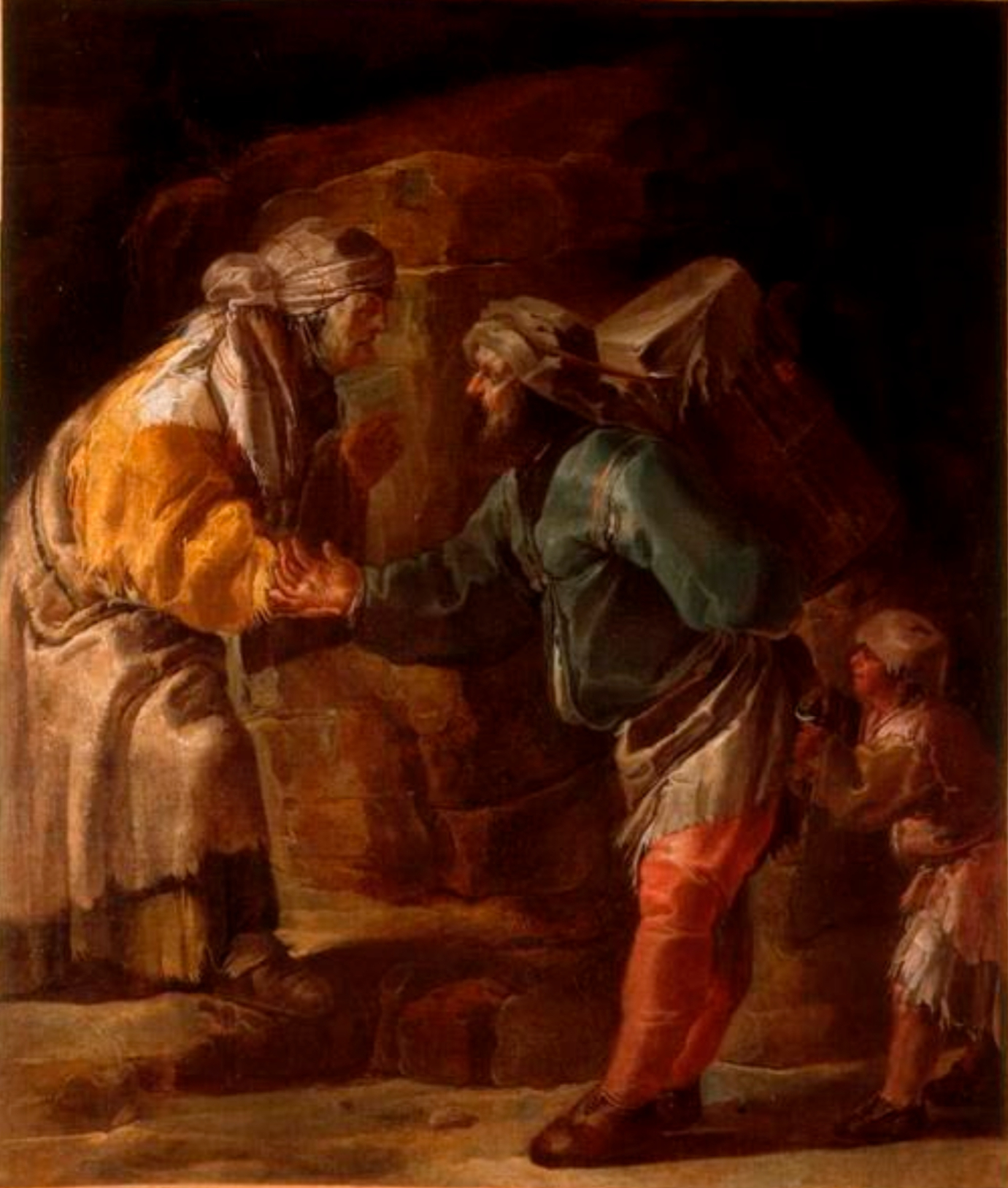
Jan van de Venne, The fortune teller, 1631–1651, oil on canvas, 102 × 85 cm.

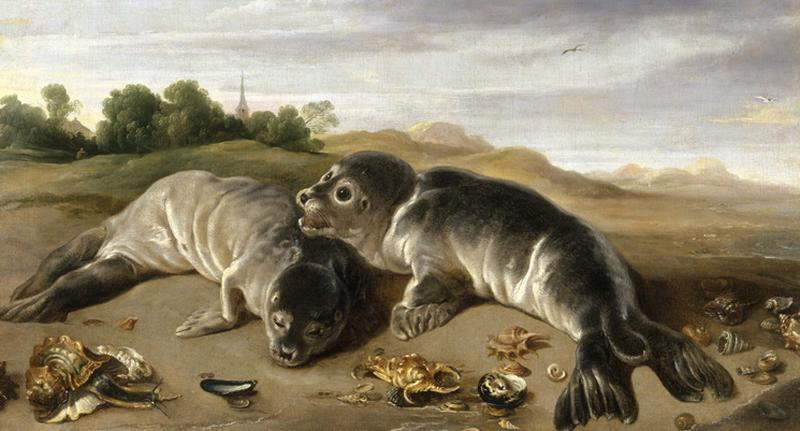
Paul de Vos, Two young seals on the shore, c. 1650, oil on canvas, 80 × 164 cm.

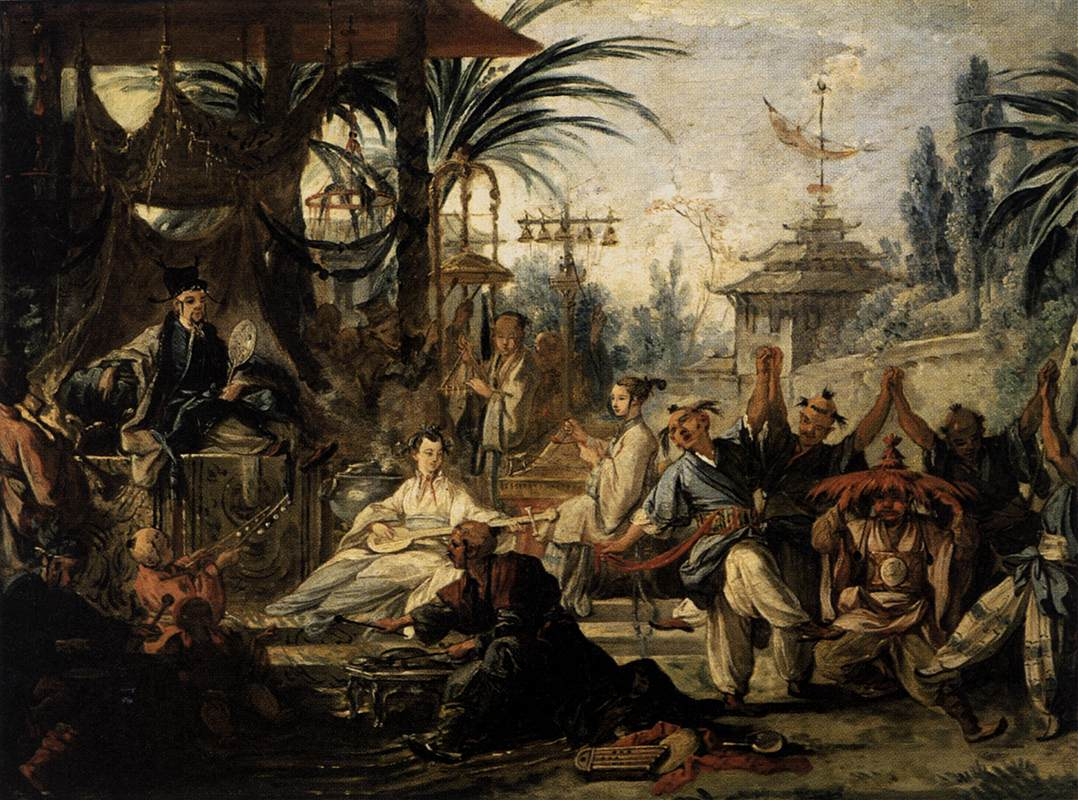
François Boucher, Chinese dance, 1742, oil on canvas, 42 × 65 cm.

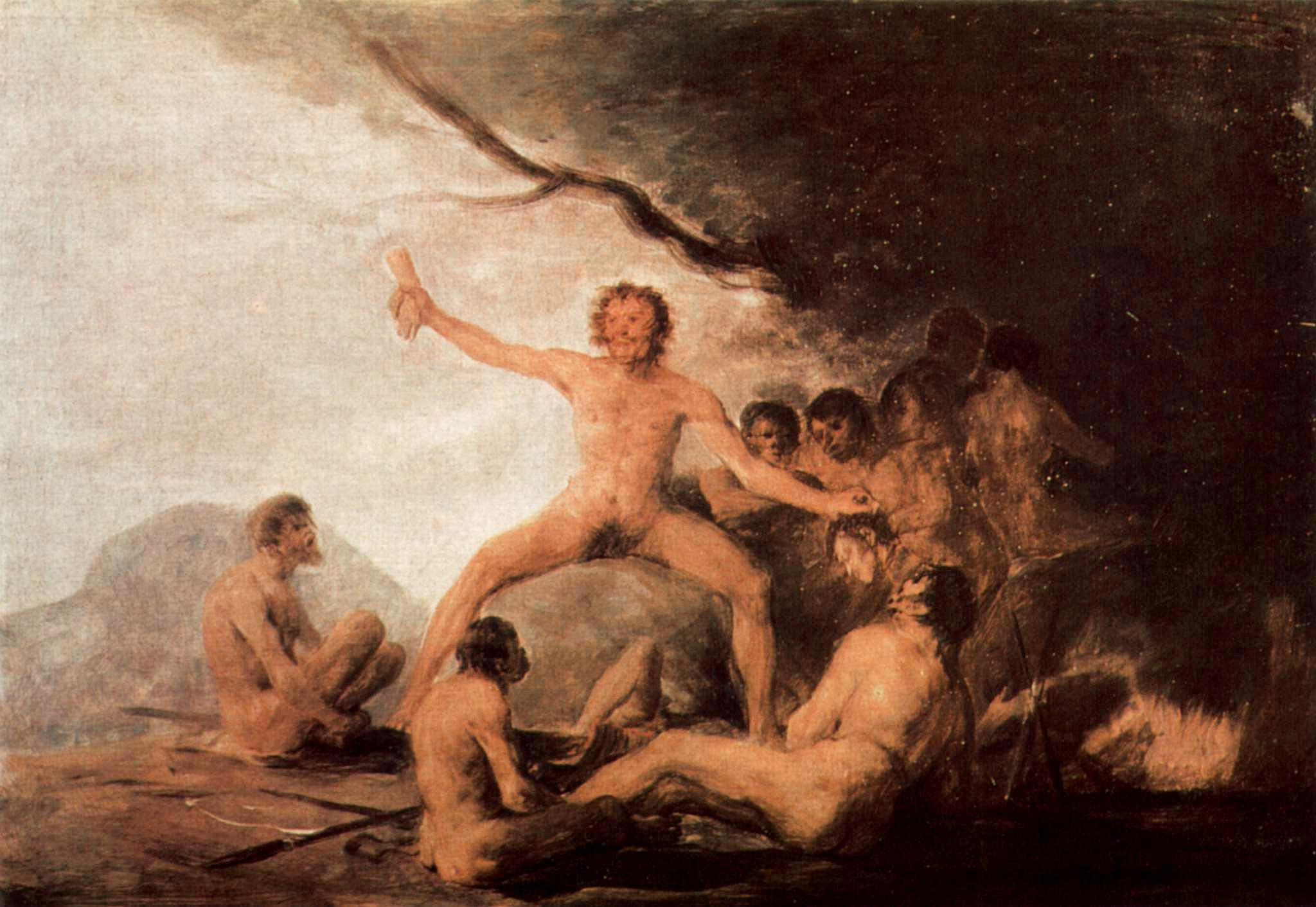
Francisco de Goya, Scene of cannibalism, 1800–1805, oil on canvas, 31 × 45 cm.

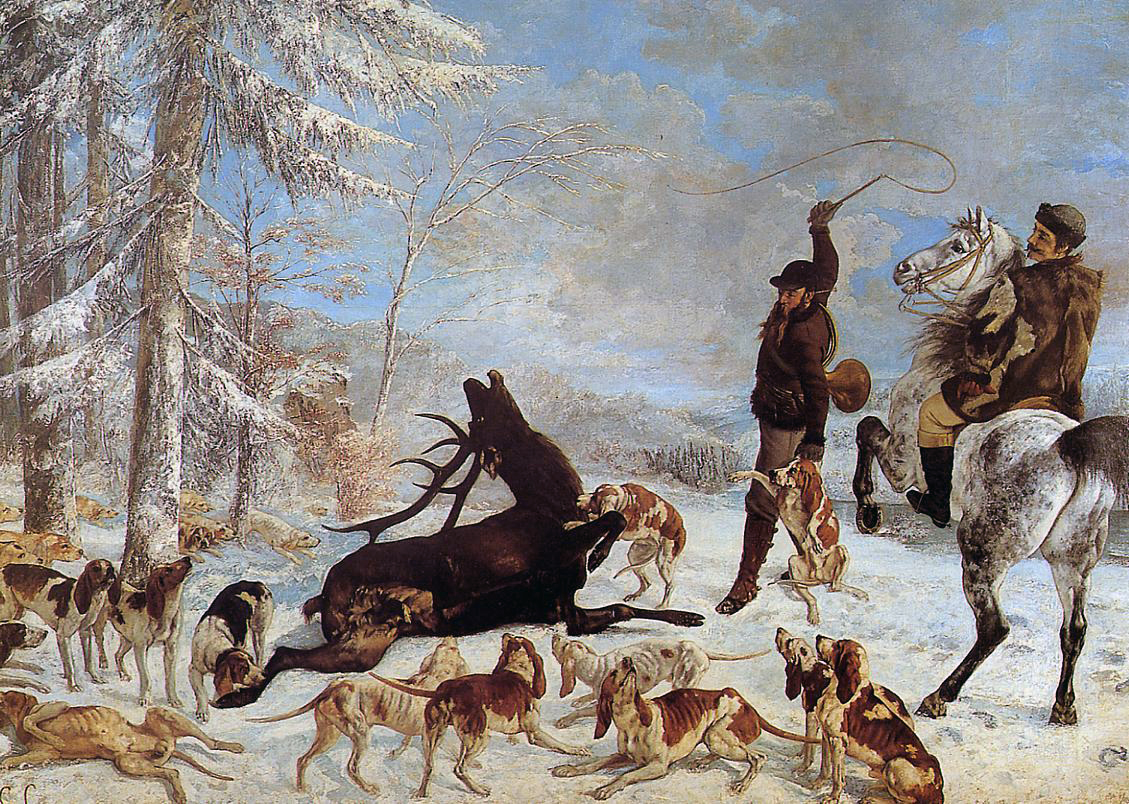
Gustave Courbet, Killing a Deer, 1867, oil on canvas, 355 × 505 cm.

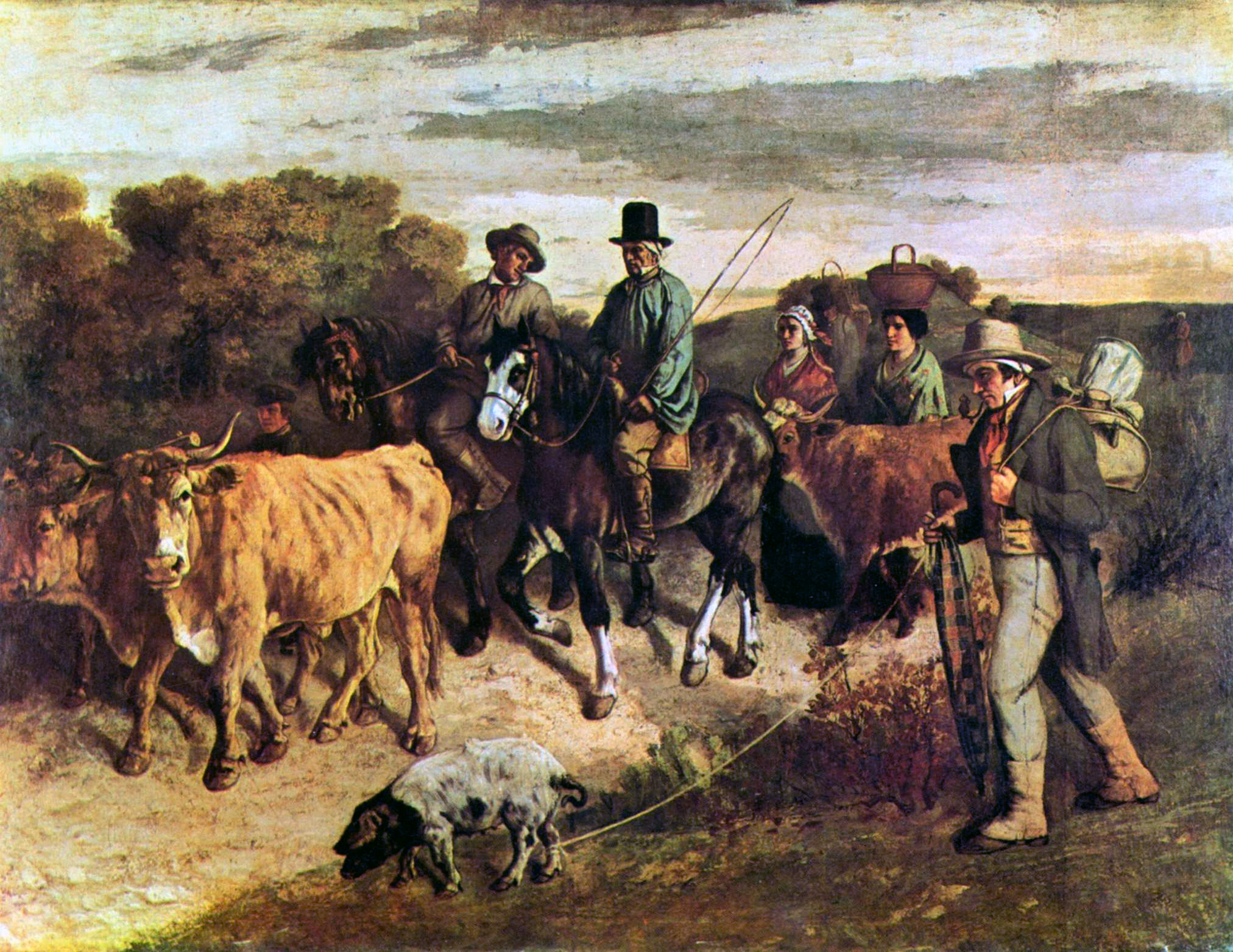
Gustave Courbet, Farmers of Flagey on the Return from the Market, 1850, oil on canvas, 208.5 × 275.5 cm.

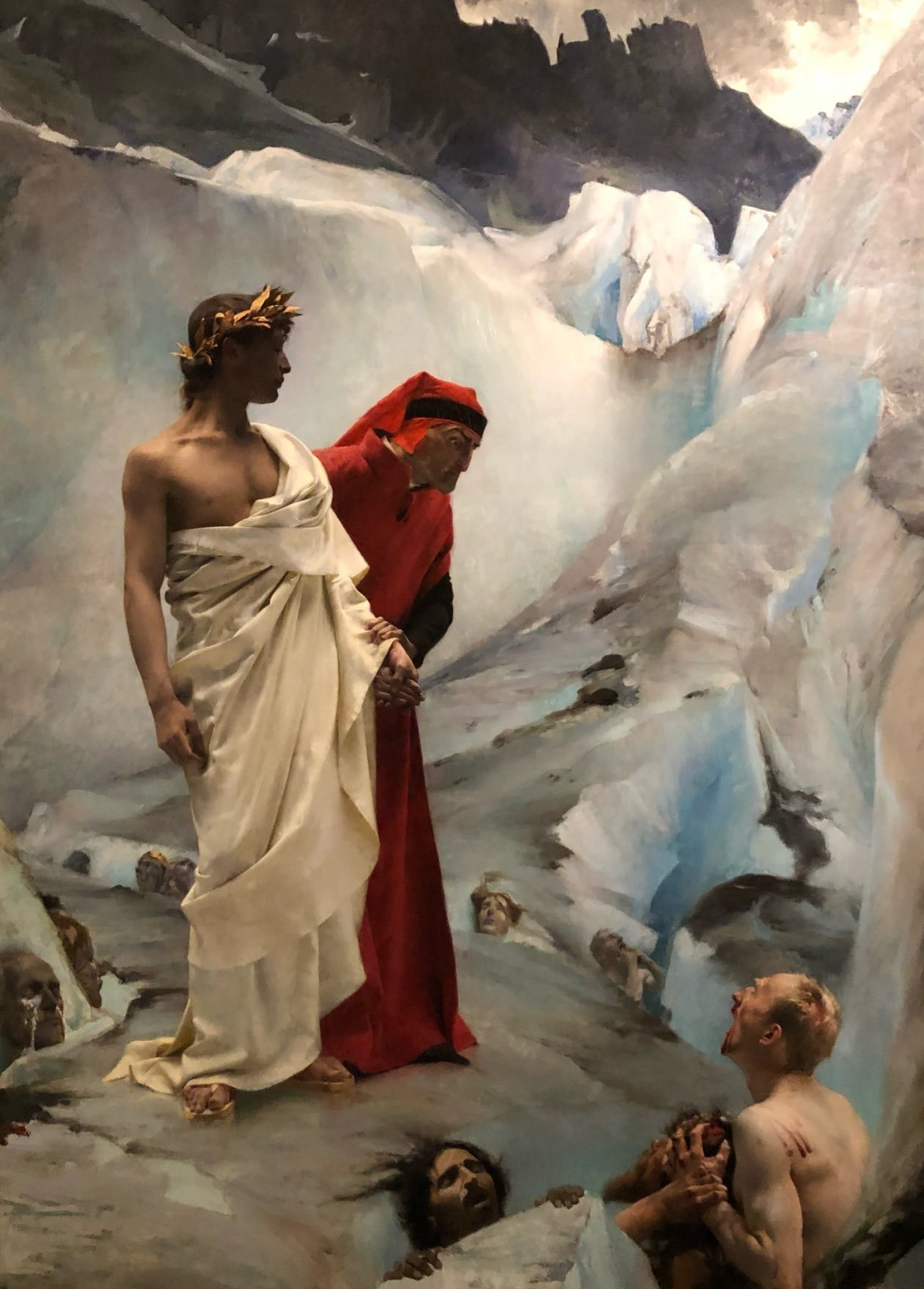
Gustave-Claude-Etienne Courtois, Dante and Virgil in the Underworld. 1879, oil on canvas, 299 x 215 cm

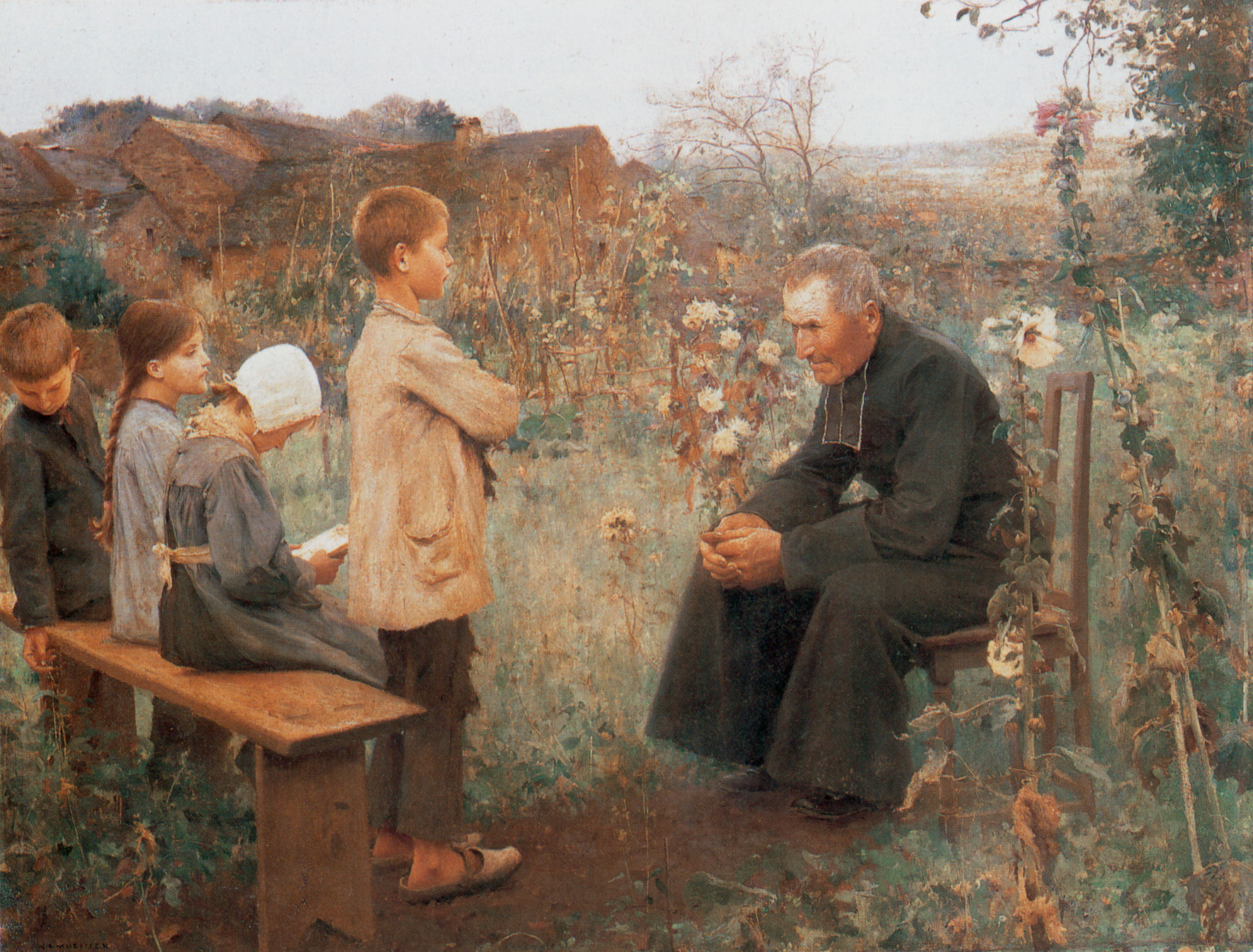
Jules-Alexis Muenier, Catechism Lesson, 1890, oil on canvas 70 × 90 cm.

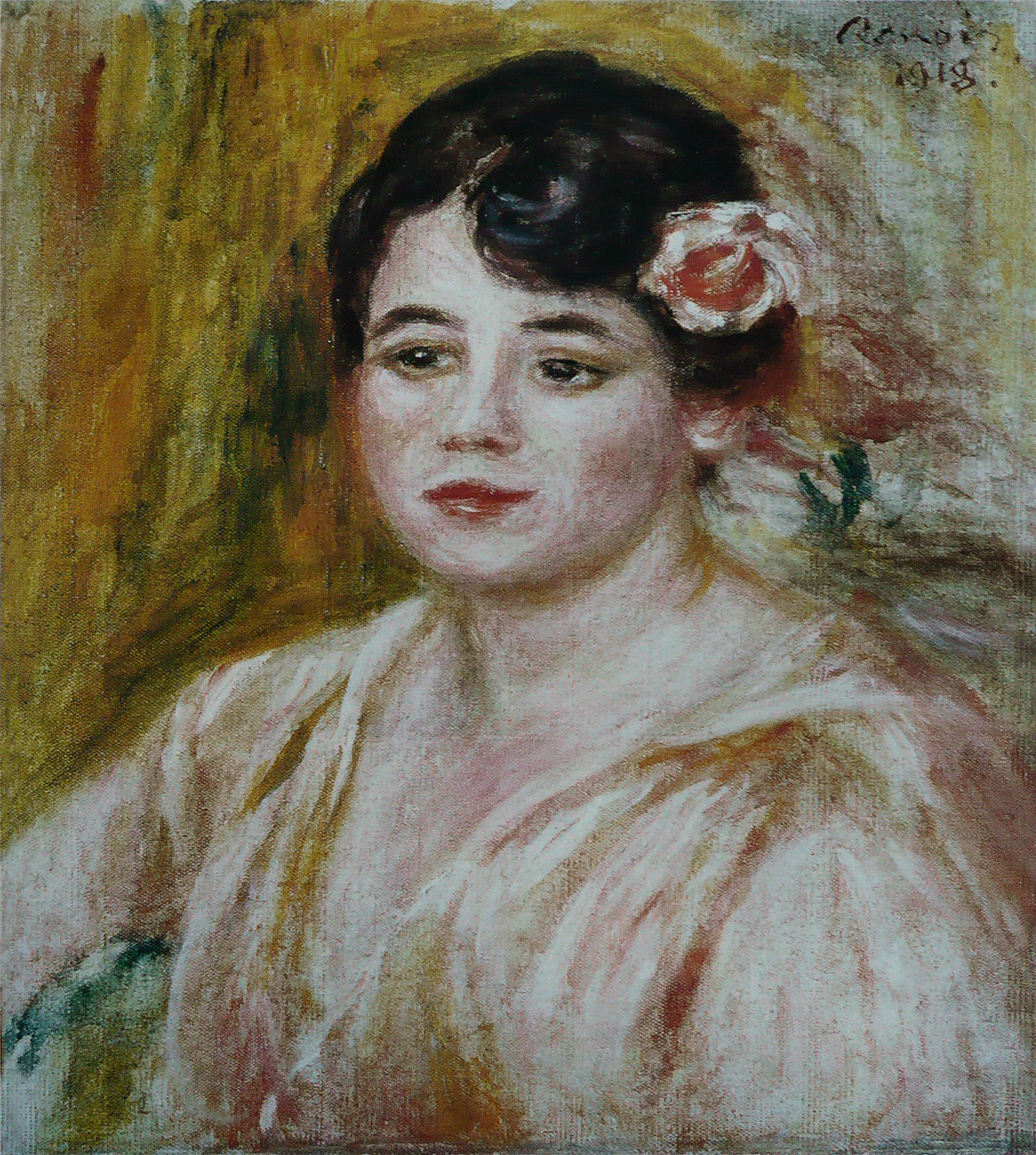
Auguste Renoir, Portrait of Adèle Besson, 1918, oil on canvas, 41 × 36.8 cm.

== Origin of the collections ==
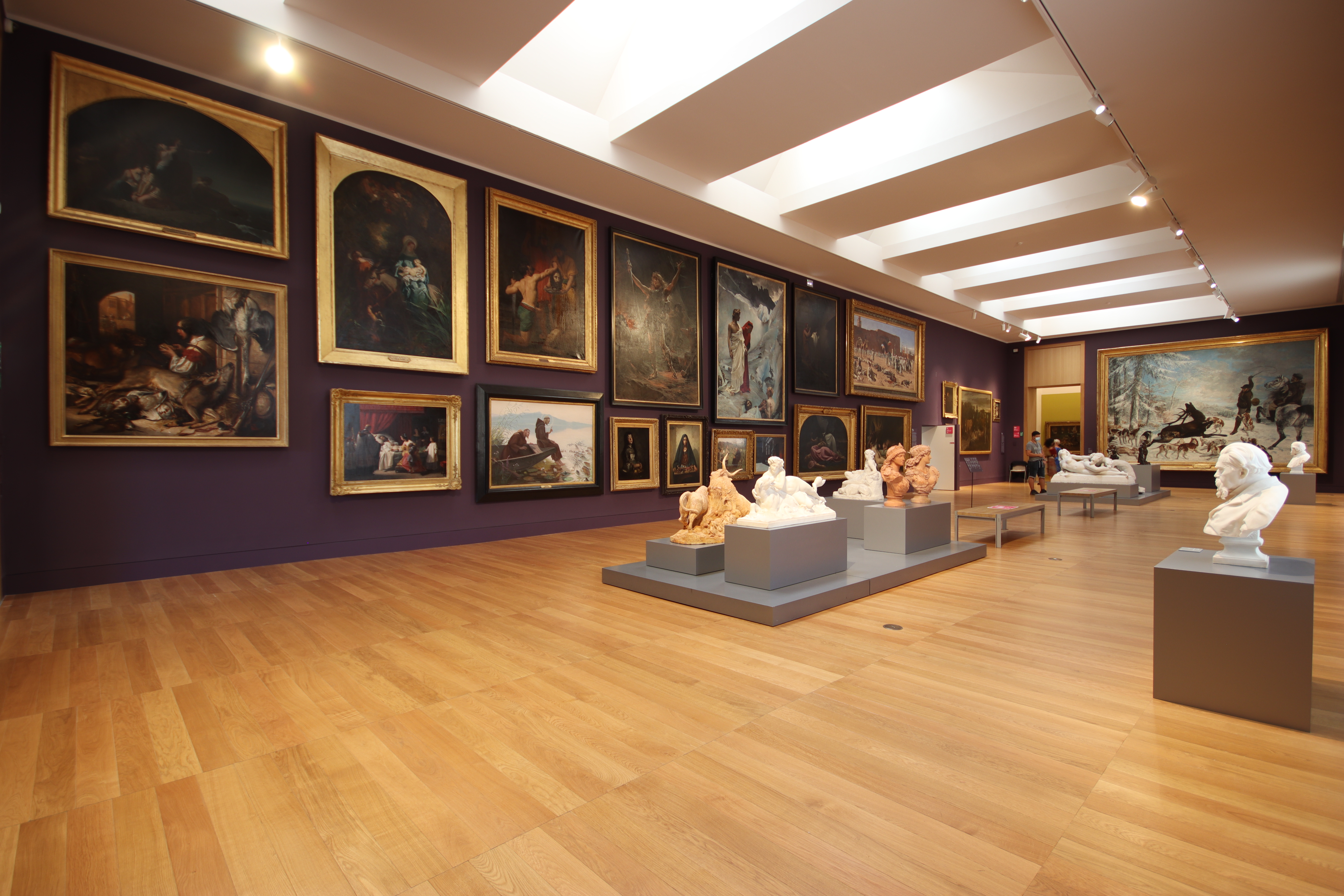
19th c. paintings.

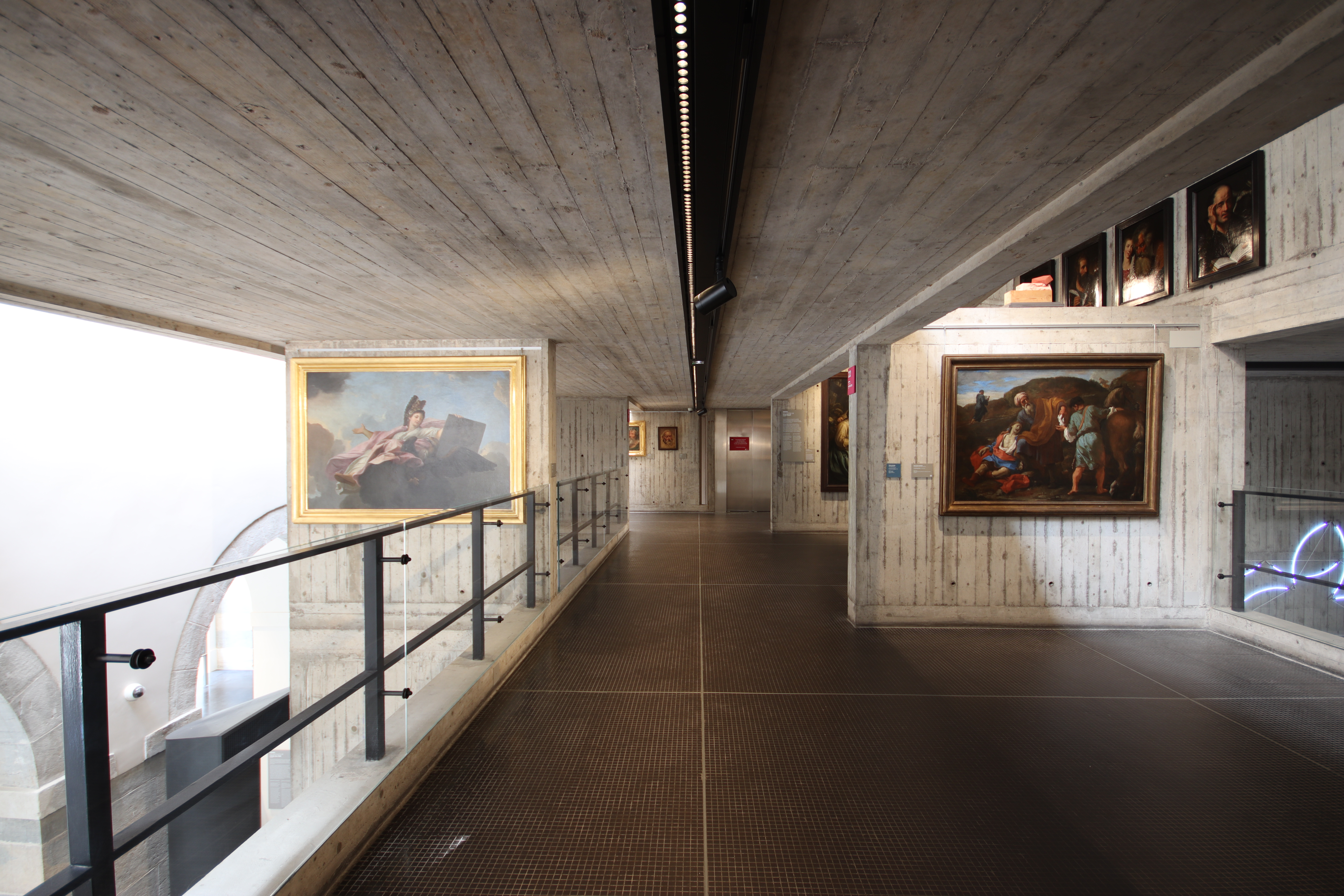
Covered courtyard by Louis Miquel.

The collections of the museum mostly originated in four gifts. In 1694, Abbot Boisot gave his collection (manuscripts, printed books, medals, eleven paintings and four busts coming from the Granvelle family) to the town's Benedictine monks, on the condition that the public had access to these collections twice a week. This bibliothèque-musée Boisot (Boisot Library-Museum) lasted for the whole of the 18th century. In 1819 Pierre-Adrien Pâris, the King's architect, added his collection (38 paintings and 183 drawings including those of Fragonard). Jean Gigoux gave the museum his collection in 1894 (over 3000 drawings and 460 paintings of Spanish, English, Northern and German schools), and finally George Besson and his wife gave the museum their collection in 1960 (112 paintings and 220 modern and contemporary drawings).

== Building ==
Since 1843, the museum has been located in a former grain hall, in the center of the town. The building became too small following Besson's donation and was rebuilt from 1967 to 1970 by Louis Miquel, a student of Le Corbusier. The interior courtyard was covered with a concrete structure.

The museum was renovated from 2014 to 2018. It was inaugurated on 16 November 2018 by the French President Emmanuel Macron.

== See also ==
- Paintings in Besançon Cathedral
