= Giovanni Battista del Tasso =

Italian architect and sculptor

- Born: 1500
- Died: 1555 (aged 54–55)
- Occupation(s): Italian architect and sculptor.

Giovanni Battista del Tasso (1500–1555) was an Italian architect and sculptor.
