= Ginori =

Ginori may refer to:

== People ==
- Carlo Ginori (1702–1757), Italian politician and businessman
- Lorenzo Ginori Lisci (1823–1878), Italian politician
- Piero Ginori Conti (1865–1939), Italian politician and businessman

== Other uses ==
- Ginori Altarpiece, a 1523 painting by Rosso Fiorentino
- Palazzo Ginori, a palace in Florence, Italy
- Palazzo Venturi Ginori, a palace in Florence, Italy
- Richard-Ginori, an Italian porcelain business started by Carlo Ginori

== See also ==
- Ginor
- Ginoris
