= The Crossing of the Red Sea =

The Crossing of the Red Sea may refer to:

- Crossing the Red Sea, a biblical event
- Crossing of the Red Sea (Bronzino), a 1542 painting
- The Crossing of the Red Sea (Poussin), a c. 1633–1634 painting
- The Crossing of the Red Sea (Sistine Chapel), a c. 1481–1482 fresco attributed to Cosimo Rosselli
