= Palazzo Ginori =

Palace in Florence, Italy

Coordinates: 43.77595°N 11.25548°E

Palazzo Ginori is a Renaissance-style palace in Via de' Ginori # 11 in the Quartieri San Giovanni of the city of Florence, Italy.

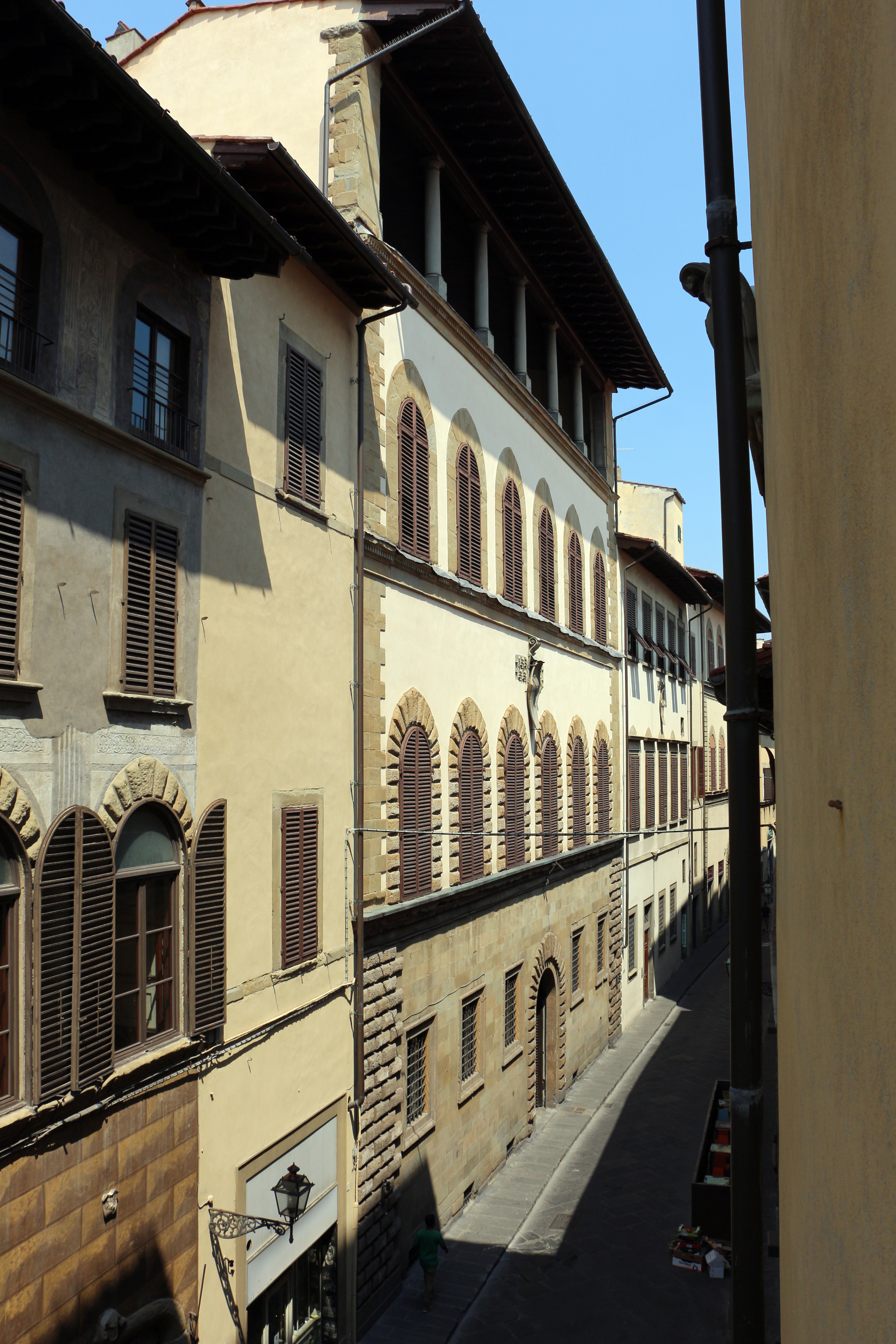
Renaissance facade

== History ==
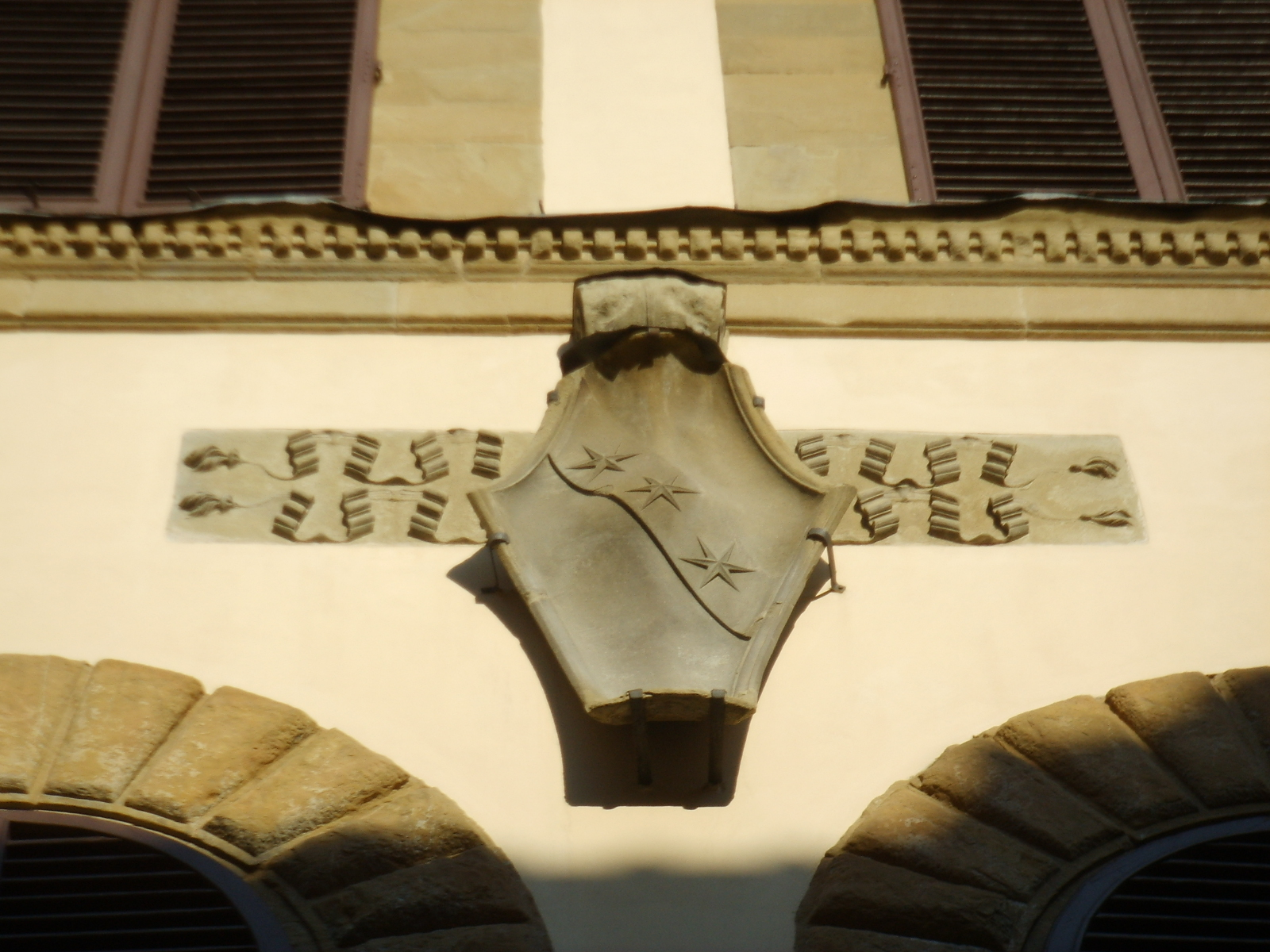
Ginori Coat of Arms

The palace was built c. 1516-1520 by Carlo Ginori, with designs attributed to Baccio d'Agnolo. The rear facade of the palace, on Via Stufa, underwent refurbishment in 1690-1701 under the architect Lorenzo Merlini and Antonio Maria Ferri, who helped refurbish the interiors.

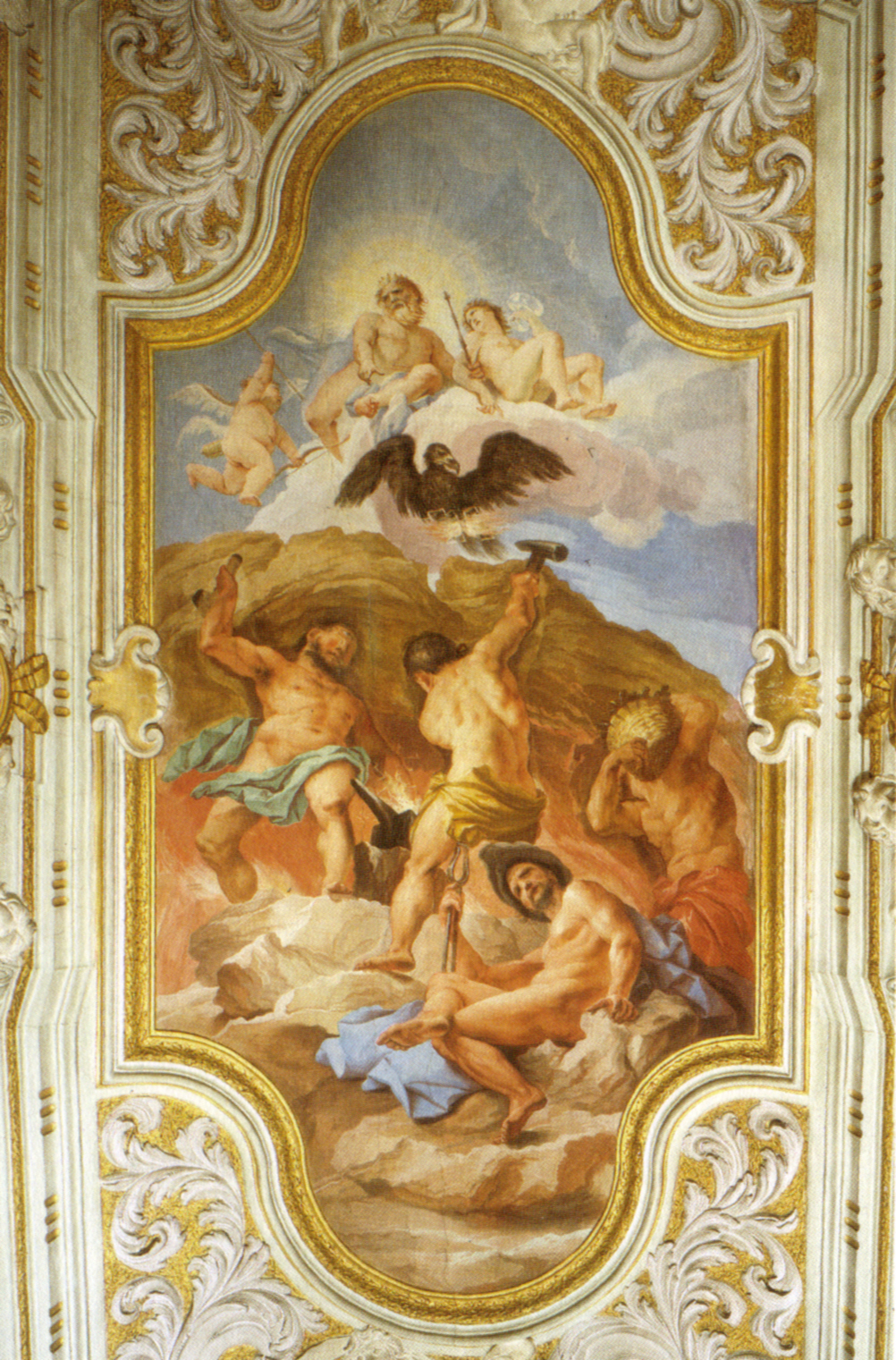
Forge of Vulcan, ceiling fresco by Gherardini

Originally the Renaissance facade had monochrome paintings of the History of Sampson frescoed by Mariano da Pescia. The late 17th century refurbishment coincided with the marriage of Lorenzo Ginori with Anna Maria Minerbetti. Interior roomes were frescoed in 1729 by Alessandro Gherardini, Carlo Marcellini, Giovanni Domenico Ferretti, Vincenzo Meucci, Pietro Dandini and Matteo Bonechi. The work of the latter two in the gallery was redecorated by Pasquale Saviotti in 1847. Further reconstruction at the time coincided with the marriage of Lorenzo Ginori Lisci with Ottavia Strozzi, and under the engineer Felice Francolini, a new monumental staircase was built

The Ginori family has lived at this site since the 15th century. Baccio Bandinelli lived and died in this house adjacent to the Ginori, now incorporated with the palace. The Ginori descended from a notary who came to Florence from Calenzano, in the Val di Marino, in 1304, and lived close to here. His son, Gino Benvenuto, was the first of 26 Priors of Florence, born to this family, and from him, they took their name. Piero, his grandson, became the first Gonfalonier in 1423, one of five such officials born to this family.

From this family also descended the Senator Carlo Ginori (died 1757) who founded a porcelain factory at Doccia near Florence in 1740.
