= Palazzo Vecchio =

Town hall of Florence, Italy

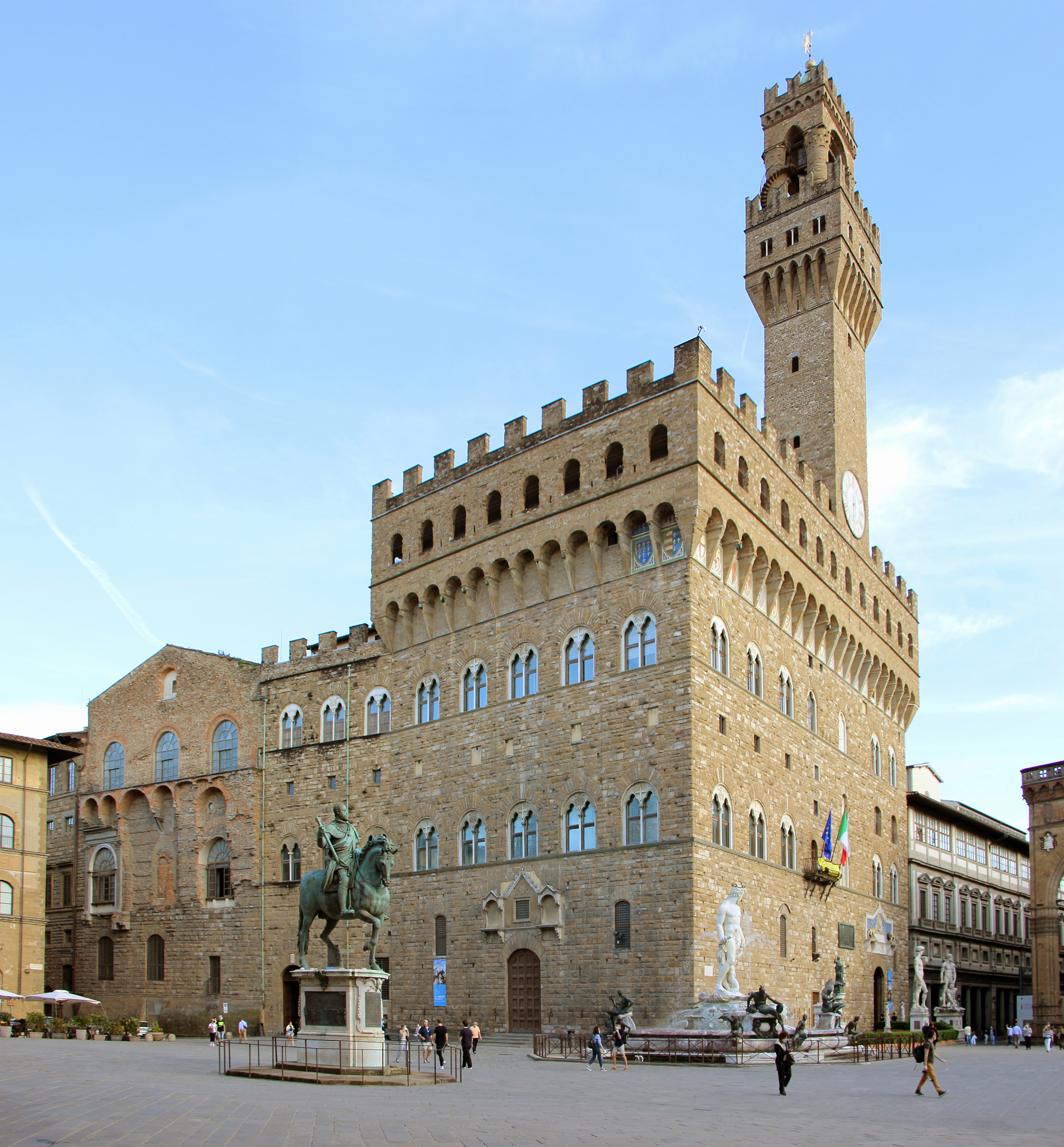
- The Palazzo Vecchio in 2021
- Interactive fullscreen map

General information
- Location: Florence, Italy
- Coordinates: 43°46′10″N 11°15′22″E
- Year built: 1299

The Palazzo Vecchio (Italian: [paˈlattso ˈvɛkkjo]; Italian for 'Old Palace') is the town hall of Florence, Italy. It overlooks the Piazza della Signoria, which holds a copy of Michelangelo's David statue, and the gallery of statues in the adjacent Loggia dei Lanzi.

Originally called the Palazzo della Signoria, after the Signoria of Florence, the ruling body of the Republic of Florence, this building was also known by several other names: Palazzo del Popolo, Palazzo dei Priori, and Palazzo Ducale, in accordance with the varying use of the palace during its long history. The building acquired its current name when the Medici duke's residence was moved across the Arno River to the Palazzo Pitti.

== History ==
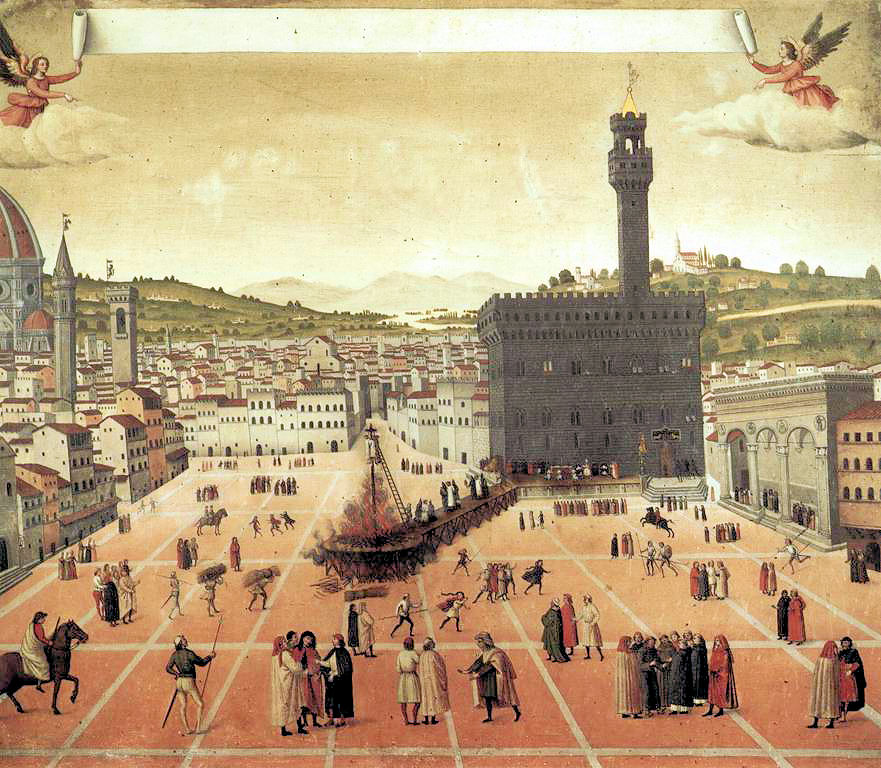
Painting of the Palazzo and the square in 1498, during the execution of Girolamo Savonarola

In 1299, the commune and people of Florence decided to build a palace that would be worthy of the city's importance, and that would be more secure and defensible in times of turbulence for the magistrates of the commune. Arnolfo di Cambio, the architect of the Duomo and the Santa Croce church, began construction upon the ruins of Palazzo dei Fanti and Palazzo dell'Esecutore di Giustizia, once owned by the Uberti family. Giovanni Villani (1276–1348) wrote in his Nuova Cronica that the Uberti were "rebels of Florence and Ghibellines", stating that the palazzo was built to ensure that the Uberti family homes would never be rebuilt on the same location.

The cubical building is made of solid rusticated stonework, with two rows of two-lighted Gothic windows, each with a trefoil arch. In the 15th century, Michelozzo added decorative bas-reliefs of the cross and the Florentine lily in the spandrels between the trefoils. The building is crowned with projecting crenellated battlements, supported by small arches and corbels. Under the arches are a repeated series of nine painted coats of arms of the Florentine republic. Some of these arches can be used as embrasures (spiombati) for dropping heated liquids or rocks on invaders.

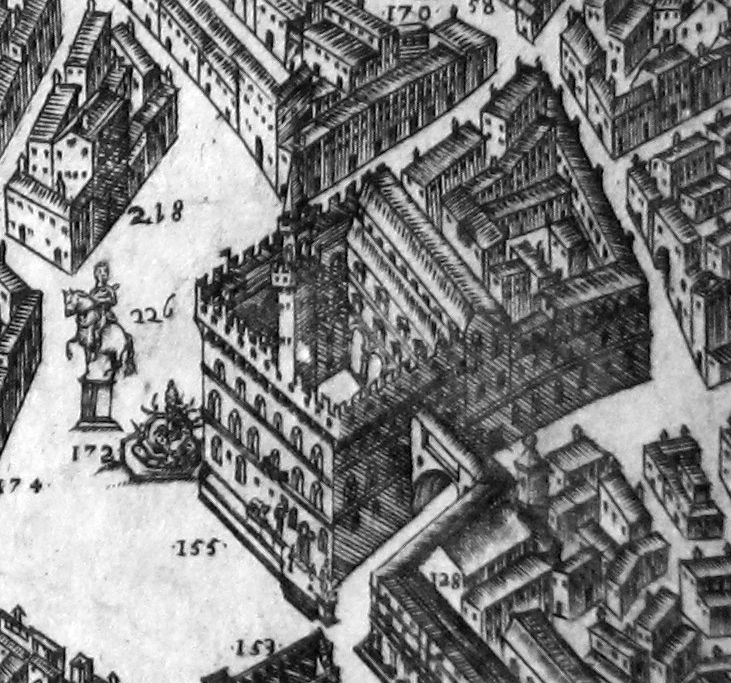
Engraving of a map depicting the palazzo and square with the corridor, by Stefano Buonsignori, 1584

The solid, massive building is enhanced by the simple tower with its clock. Giovanni Villani wrote that Arnolfo di Cambio incorporated the ancient tower of the Foraboschi family (the tower then known as "La Vacca" or "The Cow") into the new tower's facade as its substructure; this is why the rectangular tower (height 94 m) is not directly centered in the building. This tower contains two small cells, that, at different times, imprisoned Cosimo de' Medici (the Elder) (1435) and Girolamo Savonarola (1498). The tower is named Torre d'Arnolfo after its designer. The tower's large, one-handed clock was originally constructed in 1353 by the Florentine Nicolò Bernardo, but was replaced in 1667 with a replica made by Georg Lederle from the German town of Augsburg (Italians refer to him as Giorgio Lederle of Augusta) and installed by Vincenzo Viviani.

Duke Cosimo I de' Medici (later to become grand duke) moved his official seat from the Medici palazzo in via Larga to the Palazzo della Signoria in May 1540, signalling the security of Medici power in Florence. When Cosimo later removed to Palazzo Pitti, he officially renamed his former palace the Palazzo Vecchio, the "Old Palace", although the adjacent town square, the Piazza della Signoria, still bears the original name. Cosimo commissioned Giorgio Vasari to build an above-ground walkway, the Vasari corridor, from the Palazzo Vecchio, through the Uffizi, over the Ponte Vecchio to the Palazzo Pitti. Cosimo I also moved the seat of government to the Uffizi.

The palace gained new importance as the seat of united Italy's provisional government from 1865 to 1871, at a moment when Florence had become the temporary capital of the Kingdom of Italy. Although most of the Palazzo Vecchio is now a museum, it remains as the symbol and center of local government; since 1872 it has housed the office of the mayor of Florence, and it is the seat of the City Council. The tower currently has three bells; the oldest was cast in the 13th century.

== Entrance ==
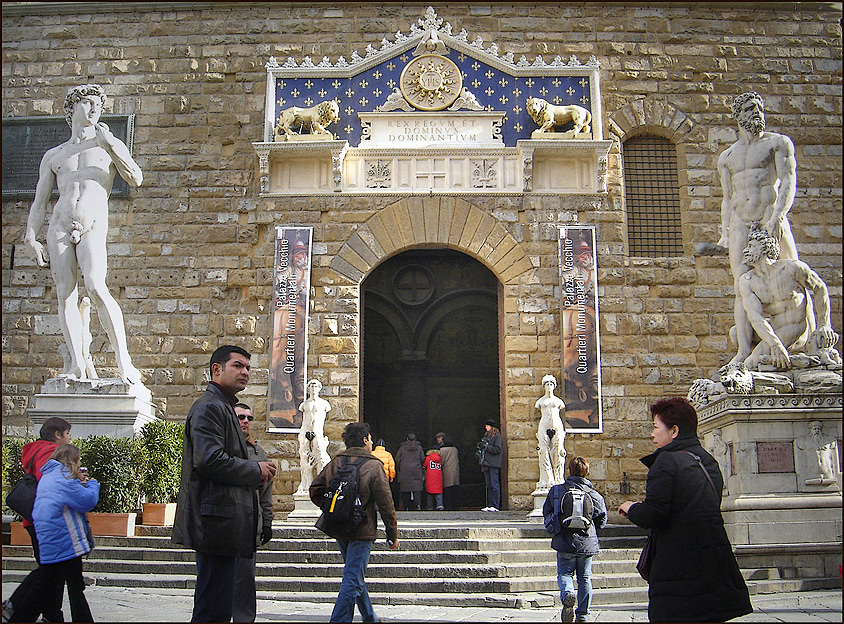
Entrance with frontispiece and statues

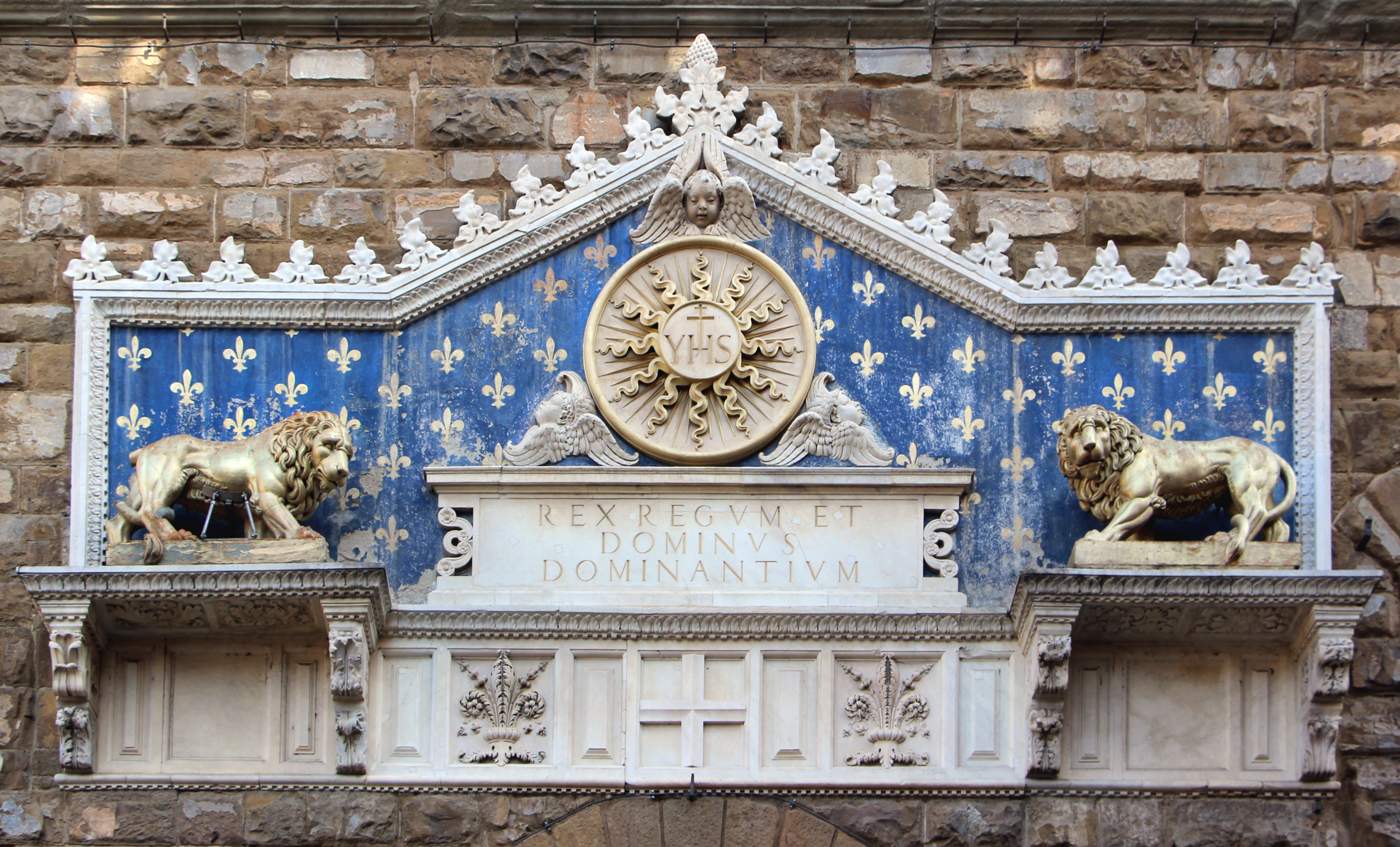
The frontispiece over the entrance

Above the front entrance door, there is a notable ornamental marble frontispiece, dating from 1528. In the middle, flanked by two gilded lions, is the Jesuit symbol, surrounded by a glory, above the text (in Latin): "Rex Regum et Dominus Dominantium" (translation: "King of Kings and Lord of Lords"). This text dates from 1851 and does not replace an earlier text by Savonarola as mentioned in guidebooks. Between 1529 and 1851 they were concealed behind a large shield with the grand-ducal coat of arms.

Michelangelo's David also stood at the entrance from its completion in 1504 to 1873, when it was moved to the accademia Gallery. A replica erected in 1910 now stands in its place, flanked by Baccio Bandinelli's Hercules and Cacus. The statuary present at the entrance of the Palazzo Vecchio is a testament to the fluctuating political atmosphere in Florence from 1504 to 1534, when Michelangelo's David and Bandinelli's Hercules and Cacus were created, respectively. The statuary in front of this political building was commissioned under two different rulers in Florence, David under Piero Soderini and Hercules and Cacus under the Medici. These statues, thus engage in a fierce dialogue with each other as well as the Florentine public about the socio-political state of Florence under each of the rulers. The statues at the entrance were installed next to each other to perpetuate different political agendas depending on their patron and demonstrate superiority from one regime to the next.

== Courtyards ==
=== First courtyard ===
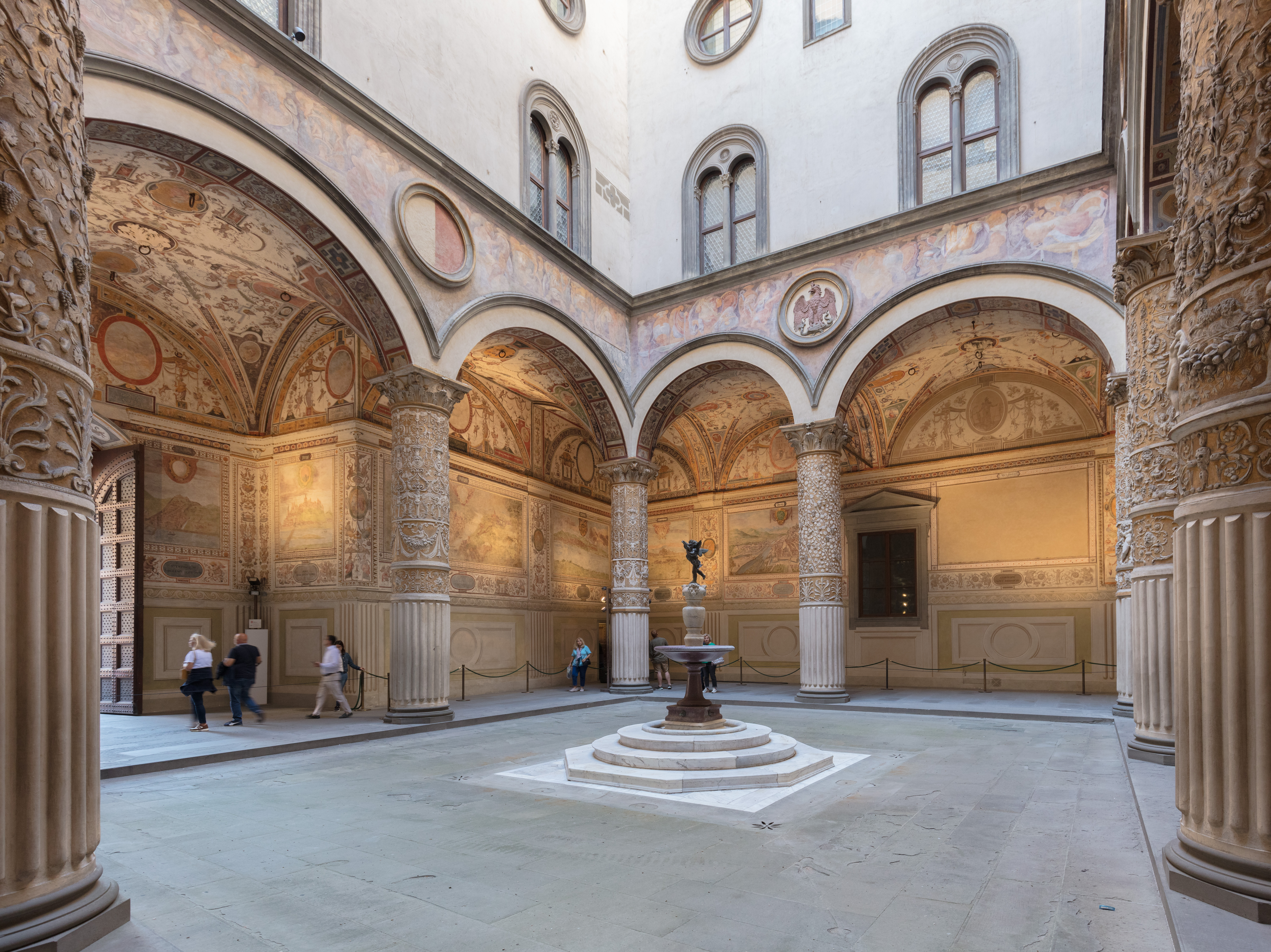
First courtyard with Putto with Dolphin by Verrocchio in the middle, and frescoes of Austrian cities on the wall by Vasari

The first courtyard was designed in 1453 by Michelozzo. In the lunettes, high around the courtyard, are crests of the church and city guilds. In the center, the porphyry fountain is by Battista del Tadda. The Putto with Dolphin on top of the basin is a copy of the original by Andrea del Verrocchio (1476), now on display on the second floor of the palace. This small statue was originally placed in the garden of the Villa Medici at Careggi. The water, flowing through the nose of the dolphin, is brought here by pipes from the Boboli Gardens.

In the niche, in front of the fountain, stands Samson and Philistine by Pierino da Vinci.

The frescoes on the walls are vedute of the cities of the Austrian Habsburg monarchy, painted in 1565 by Giorgio Vasari for the wedding celebration of Francesco I de' Medici, the eldest son of Cosimo I de' Medici, to Archduchess Johanna of Austria, sister of the Emperor Maximilian II. Amongst the cities depicted are Graz, Innsbruck, Linz, Vienna, Bratislava (Pozsony), Prague, Hall in Tirol, Freiburg im Breisgau and Konstanz. Some were damaged over the course of time.

The harmoniously proportioned columns, at one time smooth, and untouched, were at the same time richly decorated with gilt stuccoes.

The barrel vaults are furnished with grotesque decorations.

=== Second courtyard ===
The second courtyard, also called "The Customs", contains the massive pillars built in 1494 by Il Cronaca (1457–1508) that sustains the great "Salone dei Cinquecento" on the second floor.

=== Third courtyard ===
The third courtyard was used mainly for offices of the city. Between the first and second courtyard the massive and monumental stairs by Vasari lead up to the "Salone dei Cinquecento".

== Salone dei Cinquecento ==
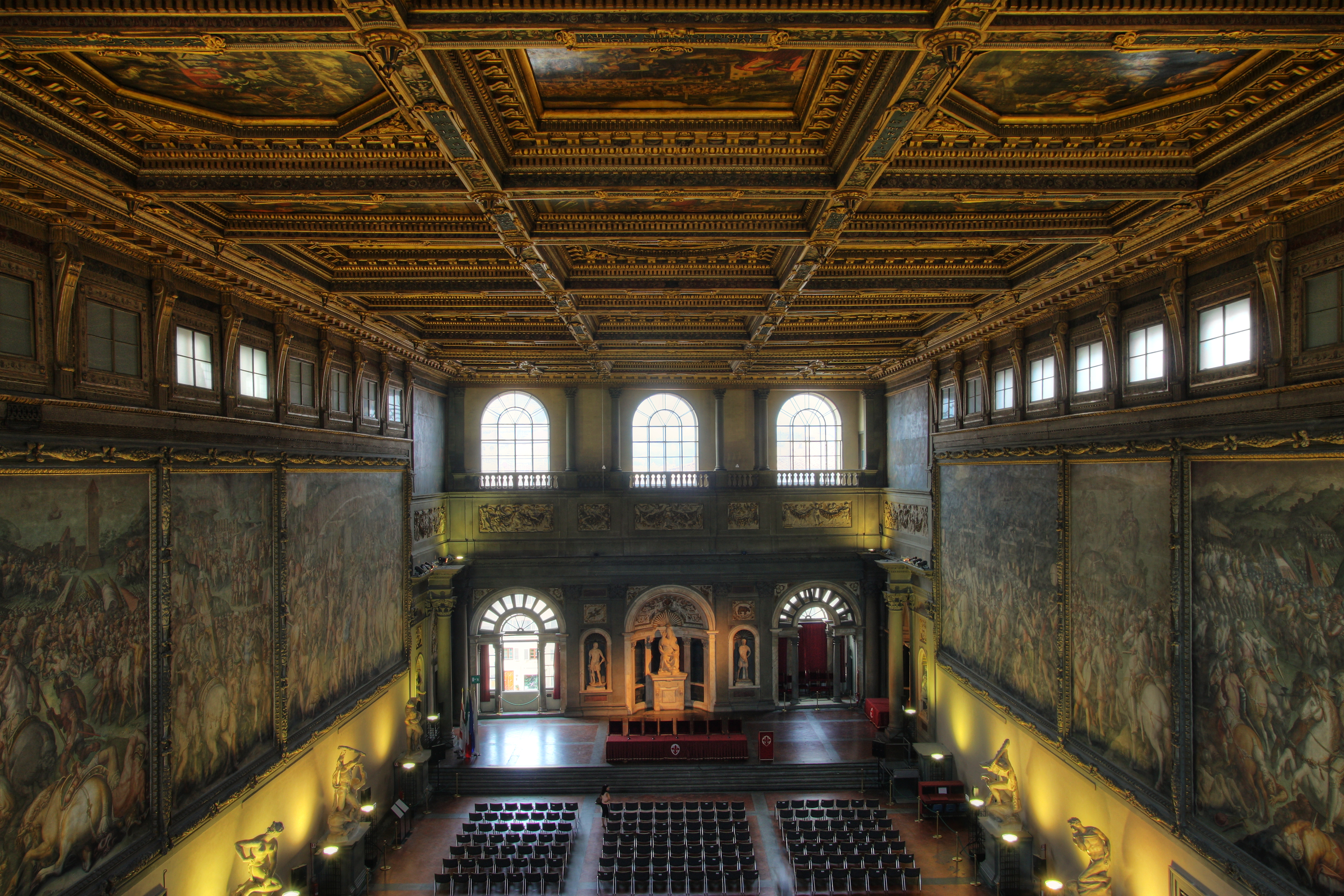
Salone dei Cinquecento. West Wall at left, East Wall at right.

The Salone dei Cinquecento (Hall of the Five Hundred) is the largest and most imposing chamber in the Palazzo Vecchio. It measures approximately 52 meters (170 feet) in length, 23 meters (75 feet) in width, and 18 meters (59 feet) in height. However, another source reports slightly different dimensions, with a width of 22.15 meters and lengths of 51.61 meters along the east wall and 53.47 meters along the west wall.

The Salone dei Cinquecento was built in 1494 by Simone del Pollaiolo, on commission of Savonarola who, replacing the Medici after their exile as the spiritual leader of the Republic, wanted it as a seat of the Grand Council (Consiglio Maggiore) consisting of 500 members.

Later, the hall was enlarged by Giorgio Vasari so that Grand Duke Cosimo I could hold his court in this chamber. During this transformation, famous (but unfinished) works were lost, including the Battle of Cascina by Michelangelo, and the Battle of Anghiari by Leonardo da Vinci. Leonardo was commissioned in 1503 to paint one long wall with a battle scene celebrating a famous Florentine victory. He was always trying new methods and materials and decided to mix wax into his pigments. Da Vinci had finished painting part of the wall, but it was not drying fast enough, so he brought in braziers stoked with hot coals to try to hurry the process. A legend exists that Giorgio Vasari, wanting to preserve Da Vinci's work, had a false wall built over the top of The Battle of Anghiari before painting his fresco. Attempts to find Da Vinci's original work behind the Vasari fresco have so far been inconclusive.

Michelangelo never proceeded beyond the preparatory drawings for the fresco he was commissioned to paint on the opposite wall. Pope Julius II called him to Rome to paint the Sistine Chapel, and the master's sketches were destroyed by eager young artists who came to study them and took away scraps.^{Missing Ref.} The surviving decorations in this hall were made between 1555 and 1572 by Giorgio Vasari and his helpers, among them Livio Agresti from Forlì. They mark the culmination of mannerism and make this hall the showpiece of the palace.

It has been stated that the Salone dei Cinquecento is the largest hall in Italy by volume. However, Padova’s Palazzo della Ragione is 81,5 m long, 27 m wide and 24 m high. Even though Salone dei Cinquecento with its flat ceiling is close to parallelepiped and Palazzo della Ragione’s hall with open roof is not, the latter's bounding box at 52 800 cubic m is 145% bigger than the 21 500 cubic m of Salone di Cinquecento (and likely to be larger even accounting for the roof).

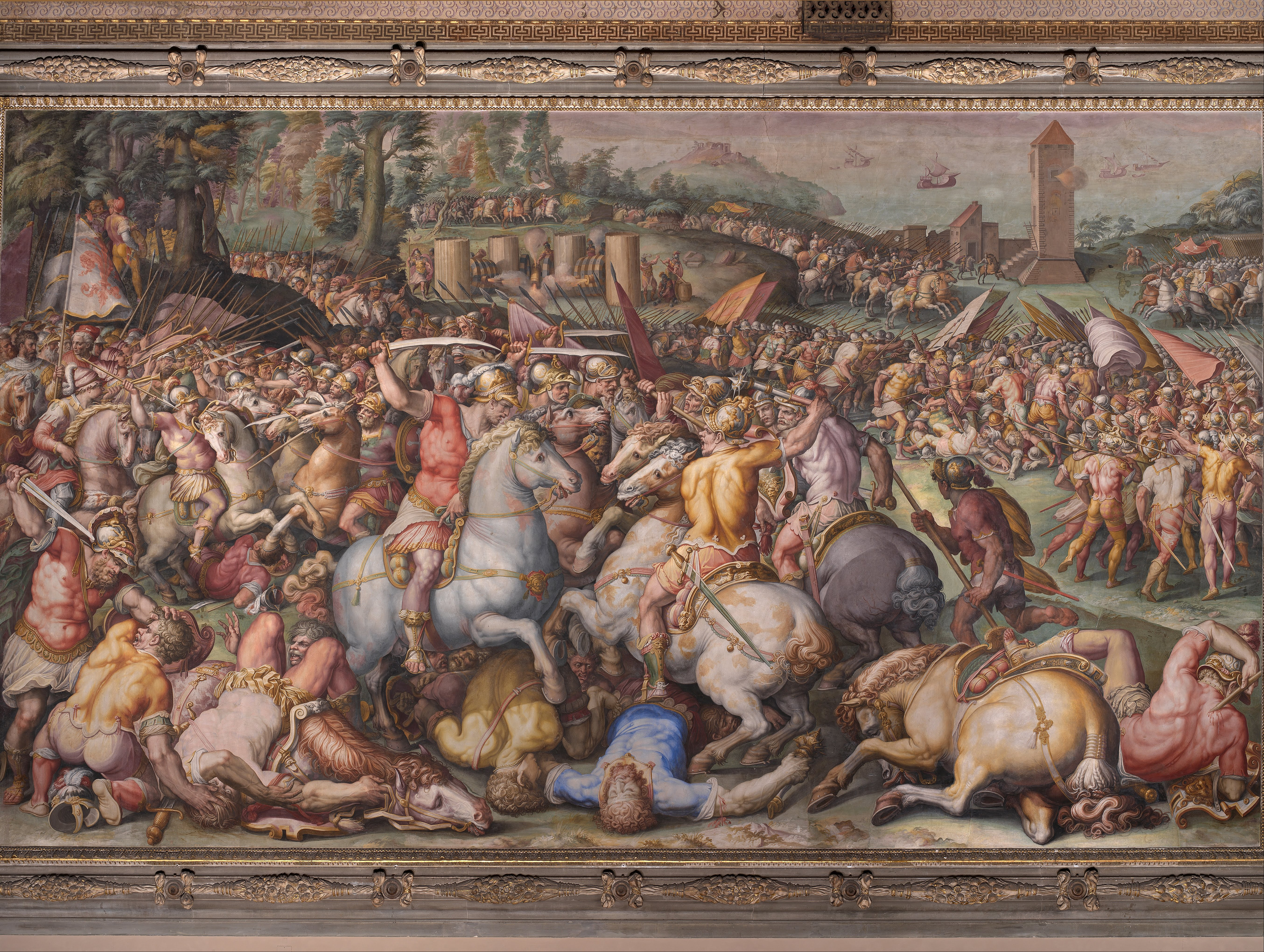
Giorgio Vasari and assistants, The Rout of the Pisans at Torre San Vincenzo (1575)

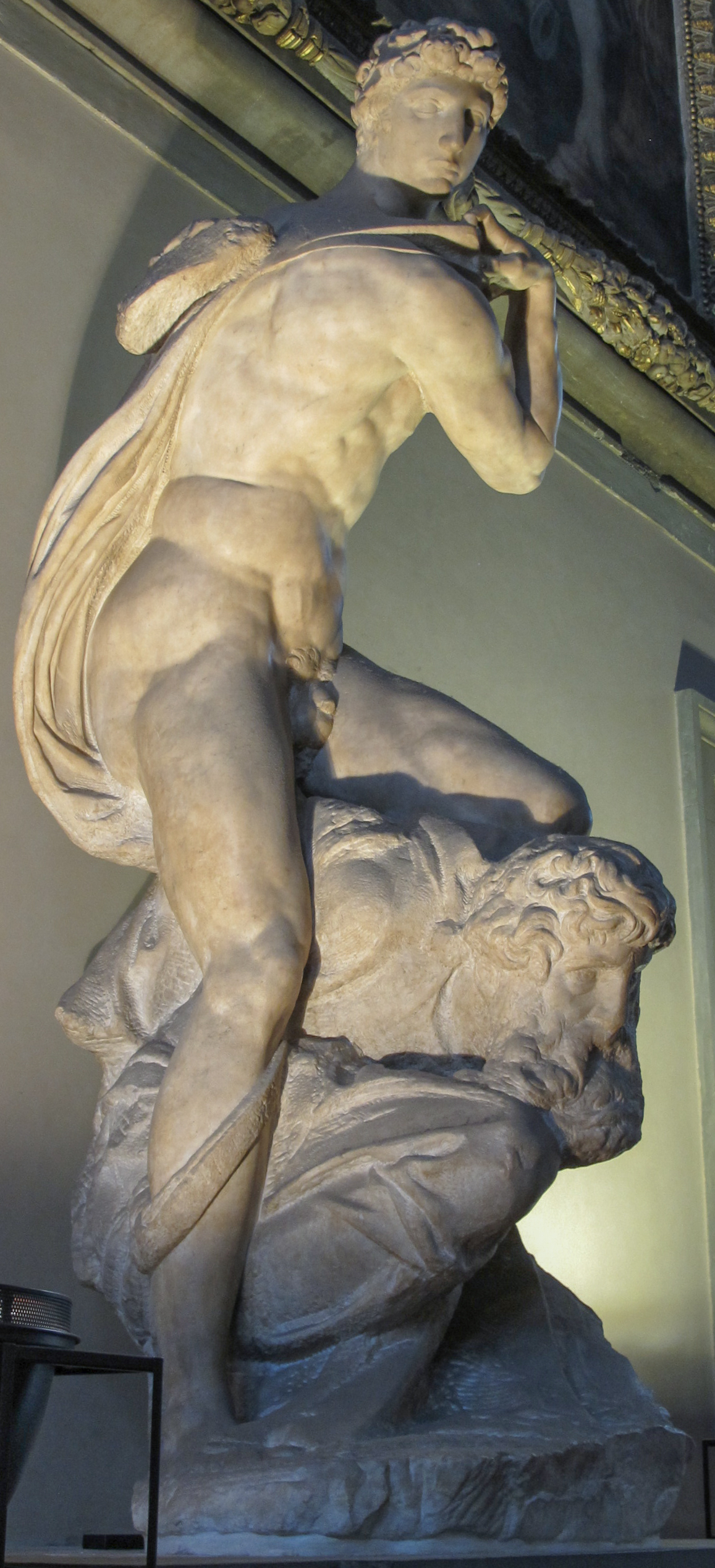
Genio della Vittoria by Michelangelo (1532–34)

On the walls are large and expansive frescoes that depict battles and military victories by Florence over Pisa and Siena:

- The Taking of Siena
- The Conquest of Porto Ercole
- The Victory of Cosimo I at Marciano in Val di Chiana
- Defeat of the Pisans at the Tower of San Vincenzo
- Maximilian of Austria Attempts the Conquest of Leghorn
- Pisa Attacked by the Florentine Troops

The ceiling consists of 39 panels constructed and painted by Vasari and his assistants, representing Great Episodes from the Life of Cosimo I, the quarters of the city, and the city itself. The center shows his apotheosis: Scene of His Glorification as Grand Duke of Florence and Tuscany.

On the north side of the hall, illuminated by enormous windows, is the raised stage called the Udienza, built by Bartolommeo Bandinelli for Cosimo I as a place to receive citizens and ambassadors. Above are frescoes of historical events; among these, that of Boniface VIII receiving the ambassadors of foreign States and, seeing that were all Florentines, saying: "You Florentines are the quintessence."

In the niches are sculptures by Bandinelli: in the center the statue of the seated Leo X (sculpted assisted by his student Vincenzo de' Rossi), and on the right a statue of Charles V Crowned by Clement VII. The six statues along the walls that represent the labors of Hercules are by de' Rossi.

In the central niche at the south of the Hall is Michelangelo's noted marble group The Genius of Victory (1532–1534), originally intended for the tomb of Julius II. The statue was placed in this hall by Vasari. In 1868 it was removed to the Bargello Museum, but was returned in 1921 by officials.

=== Studiolo of Francesco I ===
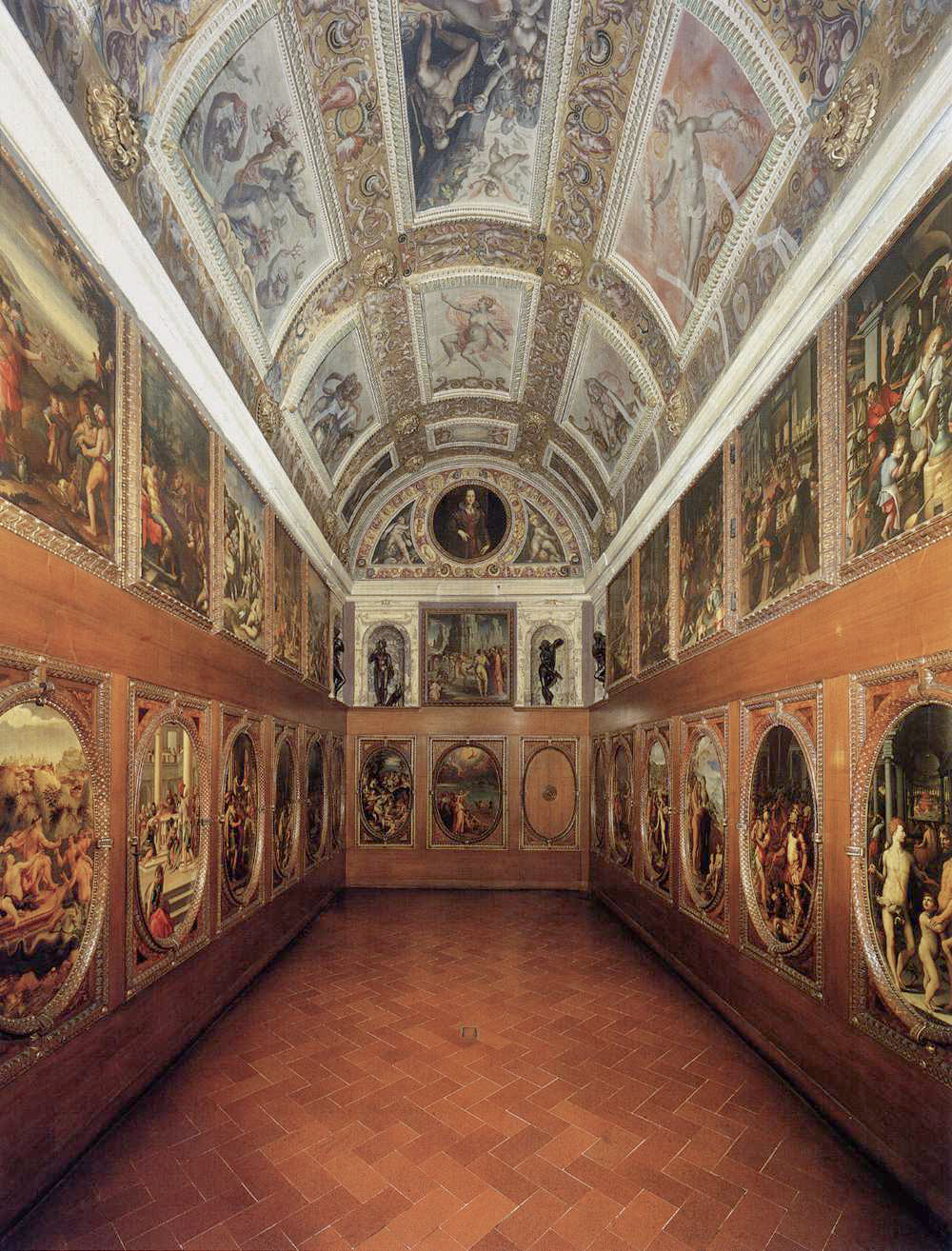
Studiolo of Francesco I

At the end of the hall is a small side room without windows. The studiolo was a small secret study designed by Vasari in a manneristic style (1570–1575). The walls and the barrel vault are filled with paintings, stucco and sculptures. Most paintings are by the School of Vasari and represent the four elements: fire, water, earth, and air. The portrait of Cosimo I and his wife Eleonora of Toledo was painted by Bronzino. The delicate bronze sculptures were made by Giambologna and Bartolomeo Ammanati. From a peep-hole, Francesco spied on his ministers and officers during meetings in the Salone dei Cinquecento. Dismantled within decades of its construction, it was re-assembled in the 20th century.

The other rooms on the first floor are the Quartieri monumentali. These rooms, the Residence of the Priors and the Quarters of Leo X, are used by the mayor as offices and reception rooms. They are not accessible to the public.

== Second floor ==
A staircase designed by Vasari leads to the second floor. This floor contains the Apartments of the Elements, Priori, and Eleonora of Toledo.

=== Apartments of the Elements ===
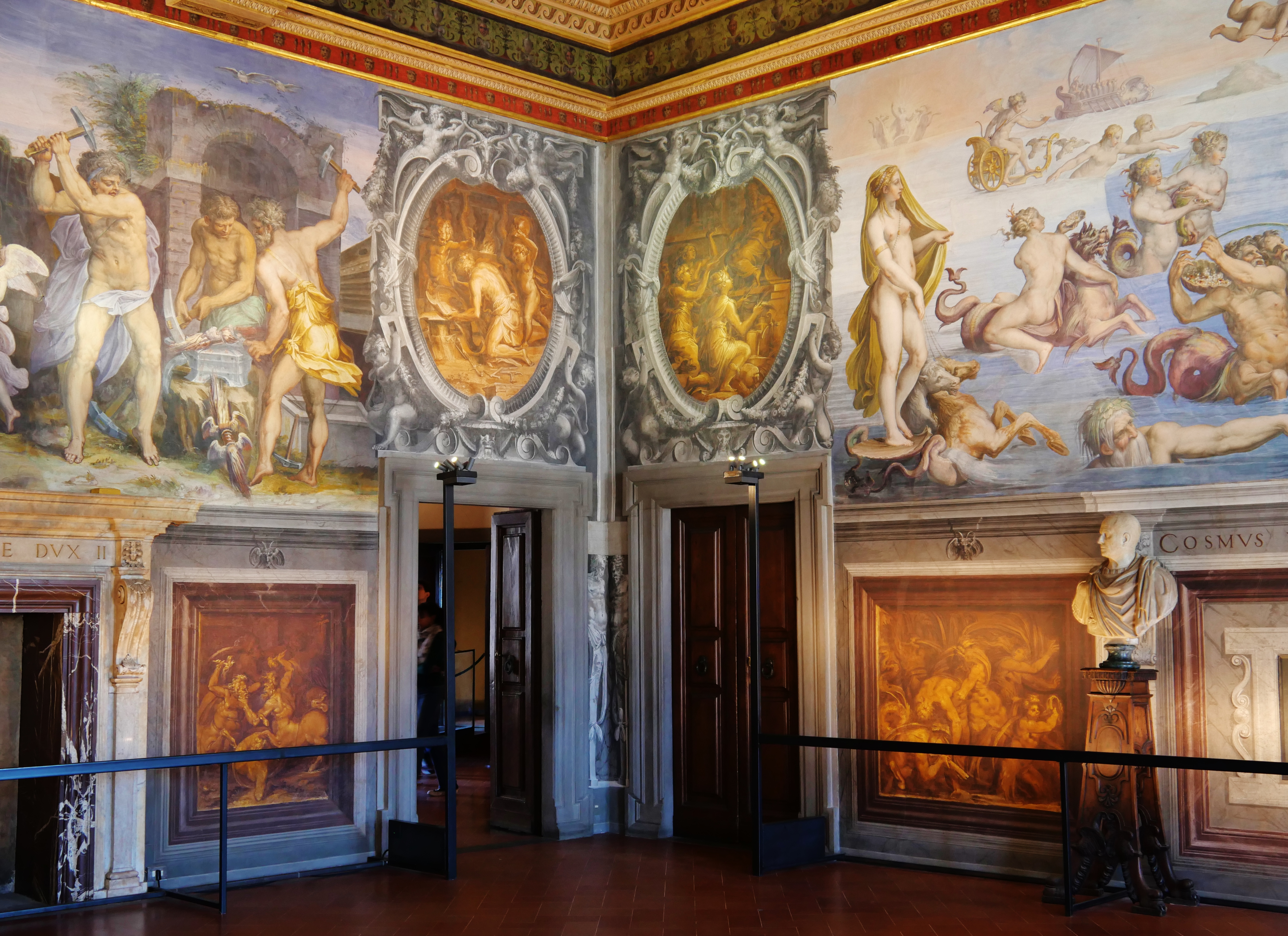
Room of the Elements

These apartments (Sala degli Elementi) consist of five rooms (such as the Room of Ceres) and two loggias. The commission for these rooms was originally given by Cosimo I to Giovanni Battista del Tasso. But on his death, the decorations were continued by Vasari and his helpers, working for the first time for the Medicis. These rooms were the private quarters of Cosimo I.

==== Room of the Elements ====
The walls in the Room of the Elements are filled with allegorical frescoes Allegories of Water, Fire and Earth and, on the ceiling, represents Saturn.

The original statue Boy with a Fish by Verrocchio is on exhibit in one of the smaller rooms (the copy stands on the fountain in the first courtyard).

==== Terrace of Saturn ====
Named for the fresco on the ceiling. There is a southeastern view to Piazzale Michelangelo and the Fortress Belvedere. Also visible are the remains of the Church of San Piero Scheraggio.

==== The Hercules Room ====
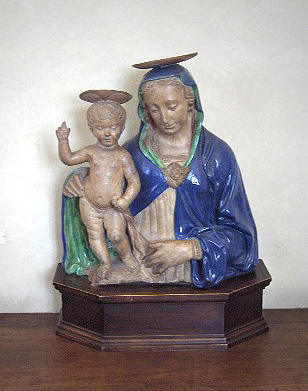
Polychrome "Madonna and Child"

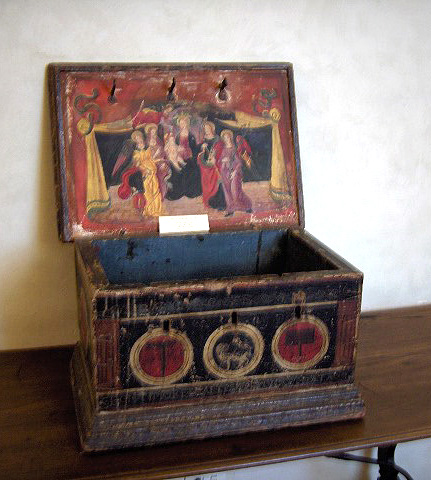
Stipo, an ebony cabinet

This room (the Sala di Ercole) gets its name from the subject of the paintings on the ceiling. Also the tapestries show stories of Hercules. The room contains a Madonna and Child and an ebony cabinet called a stipo inlaid with semi-precious stones.

==== The Lion House ====
Cosimo the Elder kept a menagerie of lions in a dedicated lion house in the palazzo. He often fought them or baited them against other animals in large festivals for visiting Popes or dignitaries.

==== The Room of Jupiter ====
The room is named for the fresco on the ceiling. On the walls are Florentine tapestries made from cartoons by Stradanus (16th century).

==== The Room of Cybele ====
On the ceiling, the Triumph of Cybele and the Four Seasons. Against the walls are cabinets in tortoise shell and bronze. The floor was made in 1556. From the window one can see the third courtyard.

==== The Ceres Room ====
The room gets its name from the motif on the ceiling, by Doceno, a pupil of Vasari. On the walls are Florentine tapestries with hunting scenes, from cartoons by Stradanus.

=== Apartments of Eleonora of Toledo ===
Beginning in 1540 when Cosimo moved the seat of government here, these rooms were refurbished and richly decorated to be the living quarters of Eleonora.

==== Sala Verde ====
This room served as Eleonora's bedchamber and was called the Green Room because of the color of the walls. The decorations on the ceiling are by Ridolfo del Ghirlandaio. A small door in the room indicates the beginning of the Vasari corridor, a passageway to the Palazzo Pitti built by Vasari for Cosimo I.

==== Cappella di Eleonora ====
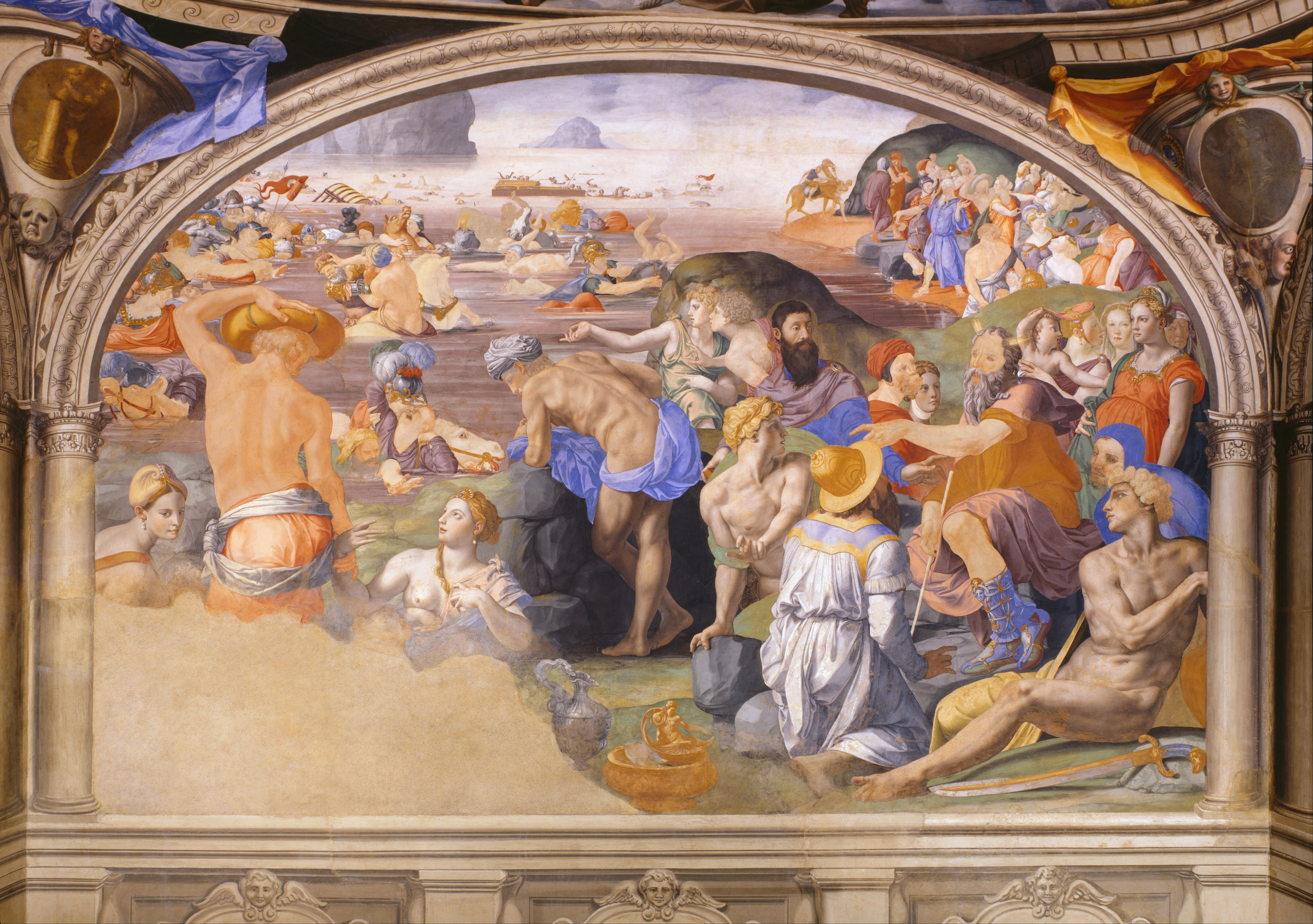
Crossing the Red Sea, fresco by Agnolo Bronzino in the Cappella di Eleonora

The small, richly decorated chapel adjoining the Sala Verde is painted in fresco by the mannerist Angelo Bronzino and includes some of his masterpieces including the Crossing the Red Sea. It was built by Tasso to be Eleonora's private chapel.

==== The Room of the Sabines ====
It was named because of the ceiling decoration. At one time it was used for the Ladies-in-waiting at the court of Eleonora di Toledo. It contains Portraits of Medici Princes by Sustermans, statues by a Florentine art school and a tapestry by Fevère.

==== Dining Room ====
On the ceiling is the Coronation of Esther decorated by Stradanus, with an inscription in honor of Eleonora di Toledo. The room contains a lavabo and two tapestries by Van Assel representing Spring and Autumn.

==== The Room of Penelope ====
On the ceiling Penelope at the loom, in the frieze, episodes from the Odyssey. On the walls: Madonna and Child and a Madonna and Child with St. John by Botticelli.

==== The Room of Gualdrada ====
This room is dedicated to Virtue as personified by Gualdrada. The ceiling painting of Gualdrada is by the Flemish painter Stradanus, better known under his Italian name Stradanus. Against the wall is a cabinet with Florentine mosaic designs.

=== Apartments of the Priori ===
These rooms were used by the priori (priors) representing the guilds of Florence.

==== Sala dell'Udienza ====
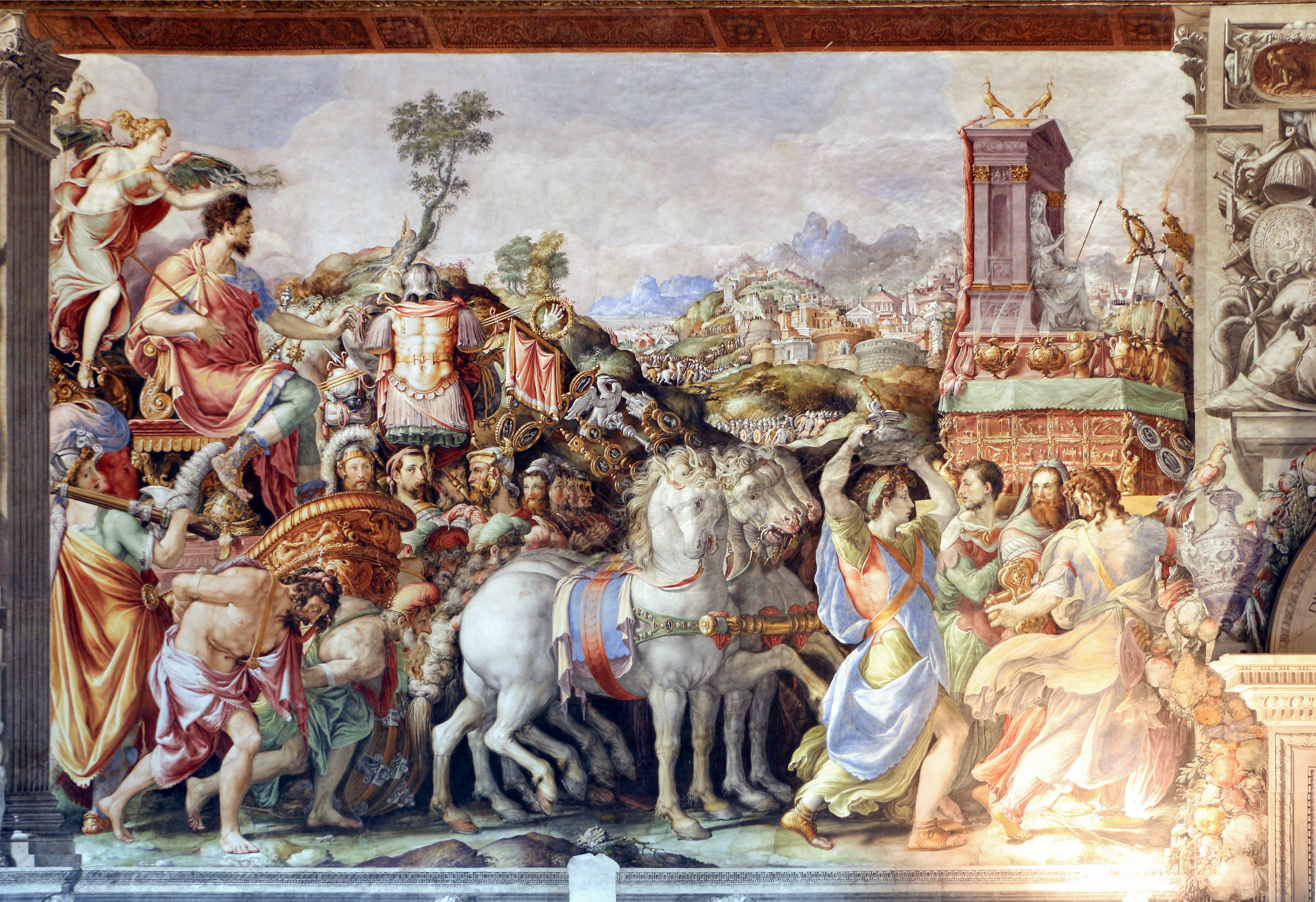
Triumph of Furius Camillus in the Sala dell'Udienza

The Audience Chamber or Hall of Justice used to house the meetings of the priors. It contains the oldest decorations in the palace.

The carved coffer ceiling, laminated with pure gold, is by Giuliano da Maiano (1470–1476). On the portal to the Chapel of the Signoria is an inscription in honor of Christ (1529). The doorway to the Hall of Lilies has marble mouldings sculpted by the brothers Giuliano and Benedetto da Maiano. The inlaid woodwork (intarsia) on the doors was carved by Del Francione and depicts portraits of Dante and Petrarch.

The large frescoes on the walls portraying the Stories of Furius Camillus by Francesco Salviati were made in the middle of the 16th century. Since Salviati had his schooling in the circle around Raphael in Rome, these frescoes are based on Roman models and not typical of Florentine art. Marcus Furius Camillus was a Roman general mentioned in the writings of Plutarch.

==== Chapel of the Signoria ====
A small doorway leads into the adjoining small chapel dedicated to St. Bernard, containing a reliquary of the Saint. Here the priors used to supply divine aid in the execution of their duties. In this chapel, Girolamo Savonarola said his last prayers before he was hanged on the Piazza della Signoria and his body burned.

The frescoes on the walls and ceiling, on a background imitating gold mosaic, are by Ridolfo Ghirlandaio. Of particular interest are The Holy Trinity on the ceiling and The Annunciation on the wall facing the altar. On the altar was a painting representing the Holy Family by Mariano Graziadei da Pescia, a pupil of Ridolfo Ghirlandaio. It is now on exhibition in the corridor of the Uffizi Gallery. Instead, there is a good painting of St. Bernard by an unknown artist.

==== Sala dei Gigli ====
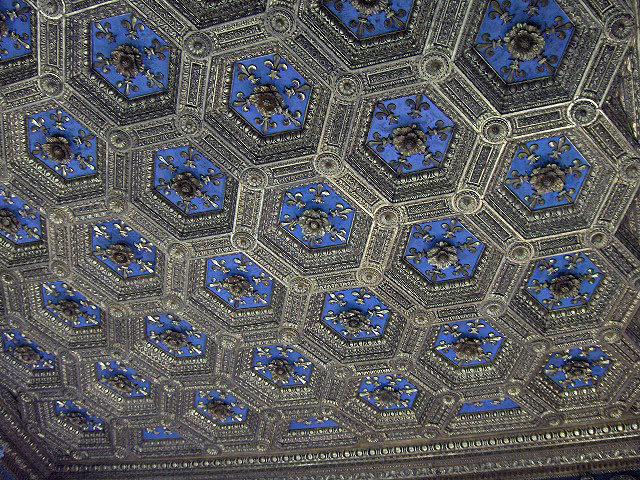
Ceiling with fleurs-de-lis

The carved ceiling of the Hall of the Lilies, as this room is usually called, decorated with fleur-de-lys, and the Statue of St. John the Baptist and Putti are all by Benedetto da Maiano and his brother Giuliano. The golden fleur-de-lys decorations on blue background on the ceiling and three walls refer to the (short-lived) good relations between Florence and the French Crown.

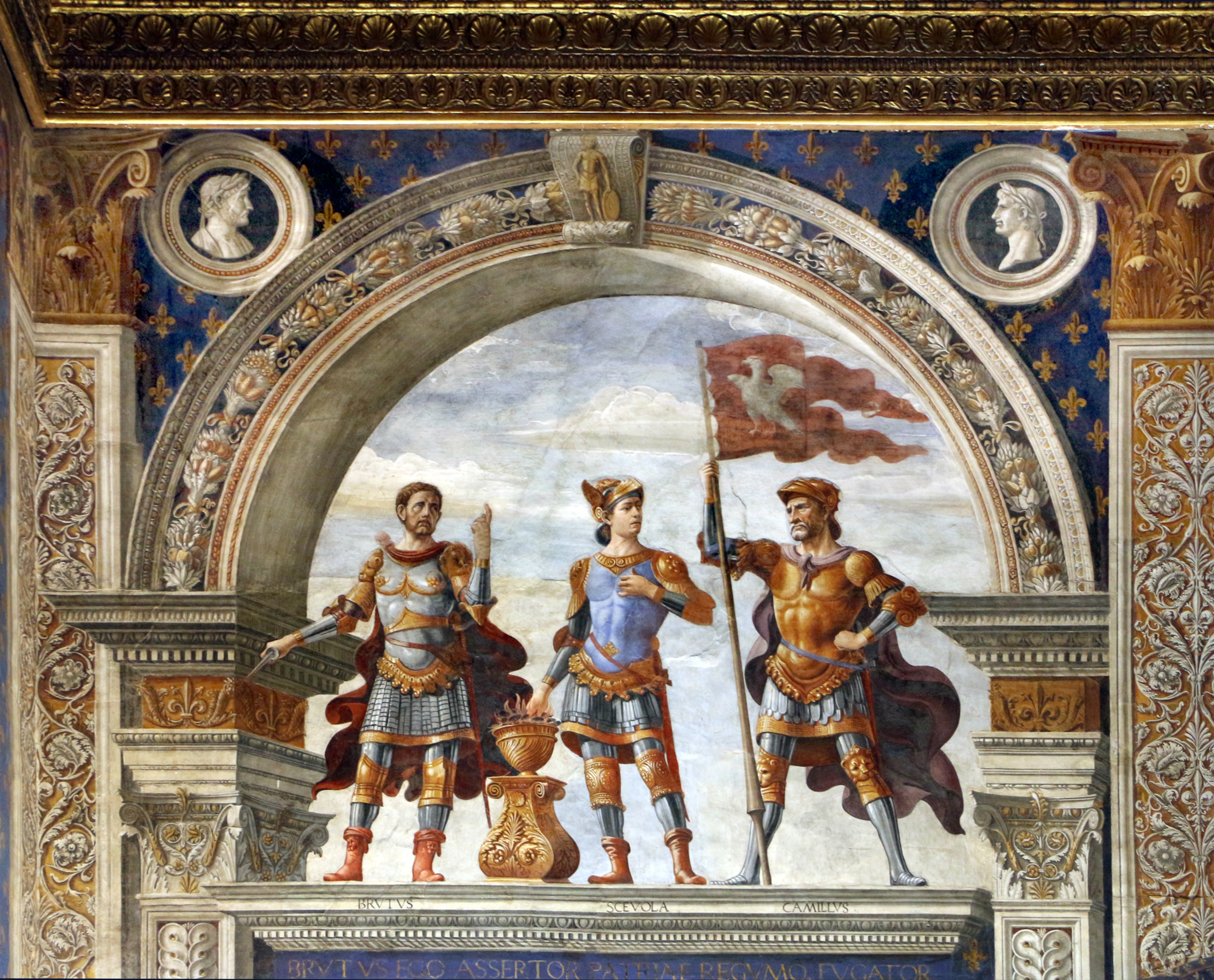
Fresco by Ghirlandaio of abtique heroes Brutus, Gaius Mucius Scaevola and Camillus (1482–84), in the Hall of Lilies

On the wall are frescoes by Domenico Ghirlandaio, painted in 1482. The apotheosis of St. Zenobius, first patron saint of Florence, was painted with a perspectival illusion of the background. In this background one can see the cathedral, with its original facade and Giotto's bell tower. In the lunette above is a bas-relief of the Madonna and Child. This fresco is flanked on both sides by frescoes of famed Romans: on the left Brutus, Gaius Mucius Scaevola and Marcus Furius Camillus, and on the right Decius, Scipio and Cicero. Medaillons of Roman emperors fill the spandrels between the sections.

After its lengthy restoration, the (original) statue "Judith and Holofernes" by Donatello was given a prominent place in this room in 1988.

A door in the east wall leads to the Stanza della Guardaroba (Hall of Geographical Maps). This door is flanked by two dark marble pillars, originally from a Roman temple.

==== Stanza delle Mappe geografiche o Stanza della Guardaroba ====
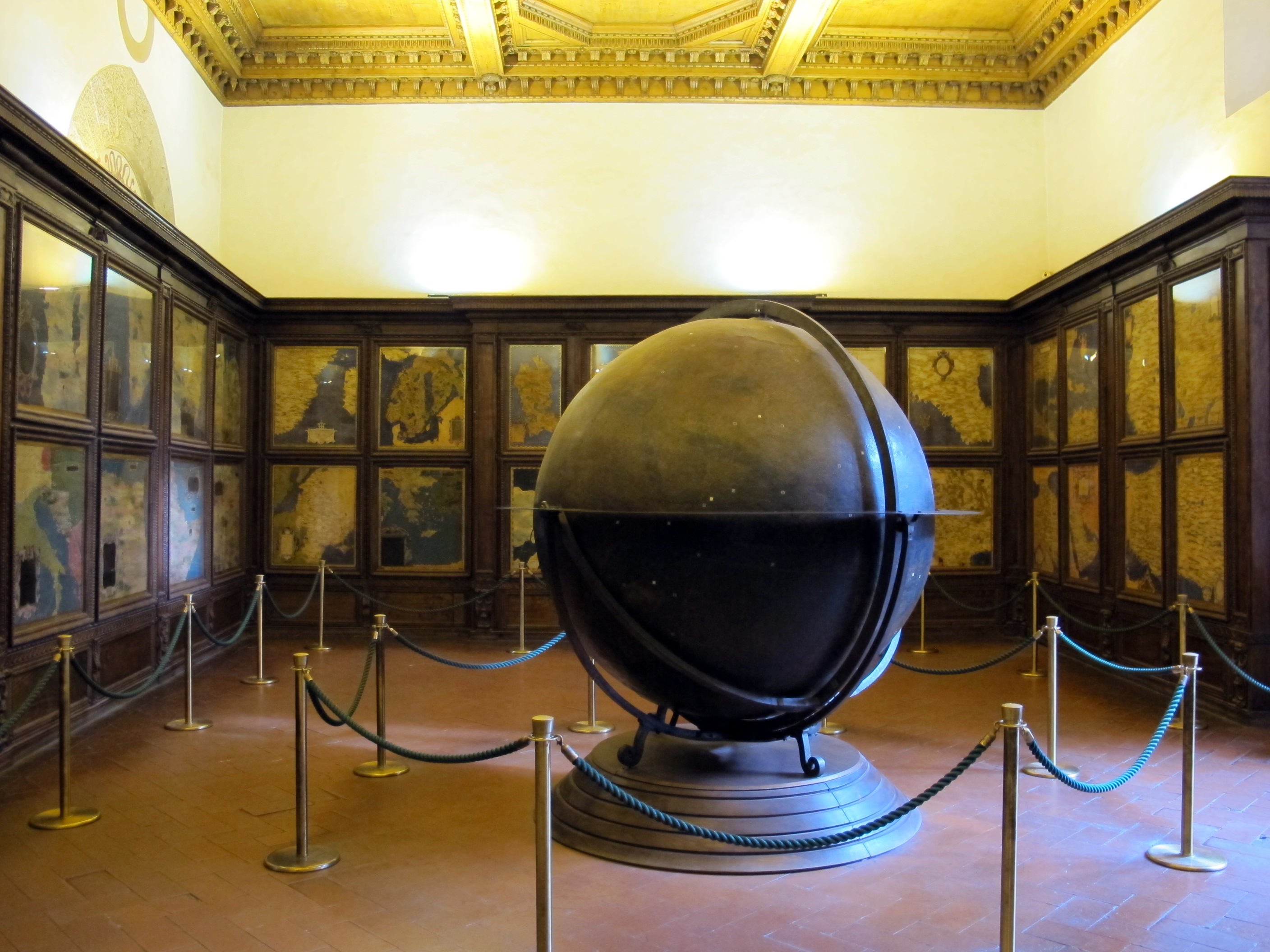
The mappa mundi

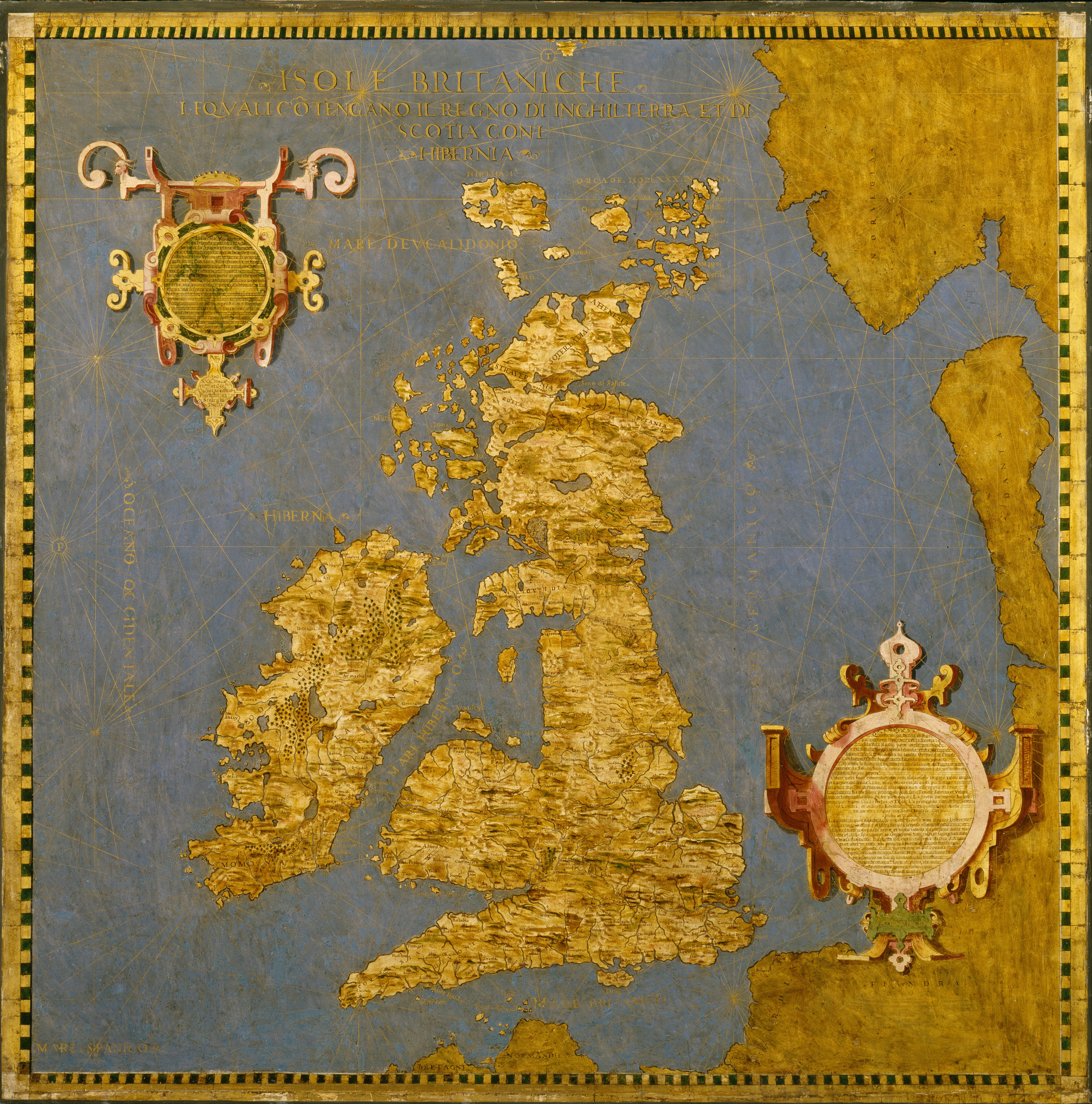
Map of the British Isles by Ignazio Danti

The Hall of Geographical Maps or Guardaroba was an ambitious room that set out to represent the known world of the 16th century through the display of a collection of artifacts and murals of cartography, all seen in relation to scientific instruments of time and astronomy. For various reasons, it was not seen to completion, yet the accounts of Giorgio Vasari, the room's designer, detail the proposed purpose and visualisation of the space. The Guardaroba was commissioned by Cosimo I de’ Medici, Grand Duke of Tuscany during his major reconstruction of the interior of the Palazzo. Construction of the guardaroba began in 1563.

The idea behind the guardaroba is similar to that of late medieval studioli, which were small private study spaces, containing precious collected artifacts. Many courtly residences possessed similar spaces to the guardaroba, yet the guardaroba of Palazzo della Signoria is one of the earliest examples that integrates cartography into its decorative elements.

Guardaroba best translates to a type of storage space, or ‘wardrobe’ and its purpose was to house a collection; an early wunderkammer of sorts. Evidently, collections of artifacts and precious items existed before the Renaissance, yet it is not until the Renaissance that there consistently appeared collections which were preserved and interpreted, known as wunderkammen. Vasari's account of the program for the guardaroba highlights Cosimo I's instructions to create a space for some of the more precious items in the Medici collection. He had also instructed Vasari to design the space so it was fit for visitors, ultimately becoming a semi-public gallery space.

Master carpenter Dionigi di Matteo Nigetti (active in Florence 1565–1579) constructed the finely crafted and carved walnut cabinets and ceiling panels that can still all be found in the room today. Each of the doors was to be decorated with an up-to-date map of a particular region. Vasari called the map murals, Tables of Ptolemy, recognising Claudius Ptolemaeus (AD b.127–d.145) significant contributions to the history and progress of cartography. The responsibility of painting the Tables of Ptolemy was entrusted to renowned cosmographer Egnazio Danti, who was later responsible for the maps in the Vatican Galleria, Hall of Maps. Each map mural, of which there were to be 57 in total, was painted directly onto the cabinet doors, 53 of these Murals remain today. The regions depicted in the map would correspond to a collection of objects and artifacts within that cabinet. The map murals were arranged across the cabinet doors in two horizontal rows representing the hemispheres and navigated most of the perimeter of the room, only interrupted at the doorway and window. A layout of maps in this fashion came to be known as a "map cycle", a term Cosimo I's guardaroba likely initiated. The map cycle is divided into sections of the then known four continents, Europe, Asia, Africa and the Americas. The guardaroba was one of the more unusual projects commissioned by Cosimo I and therefore, Vasari wrote concisely on its programme and its progress.

"Over the doors of those cupboards within their ornaments, Fra Egnazio has distributed fifty seven pictures about two braccia high and wide in proportion, in which are painted in oils on the wood with the greatest diligence, after the manner of miniatures, the Tables of Ptolemy, all measured with perfect accuracy and corrected after the most recent authorities, with exact charts of navigation and their scales for measuring and degrees, done with supreme diligence; and with these are all the names both ancient and modern. ... The images of plants and animals are exactly in line with the maps. ... The terrestrial globe is marked distinctly and it is possible to use it for all the operations of the astrolabe perfectly." – Giorgio Vasari, Lives of the Most Excellent Painters, Sculptors, and Architects

As well as the maps on the cabinets, other images adorned the room. Up to 300 portraits of famous people of the day hung around highest perimeters of the walls and would be revealed from beneath green cloth curtains. In between the cabinets doors, were to be mounted natural history drawings of flora and fauna that, as Vasari indicated above, would have been in line with its corresponding regions on the maps in a similar fashion to the objects that are revealed from beneath their corresponding region. The collected artifacts were arranged and maintained by curators and conservators known as guardarobiere, in a similar manner to the role of the contemporary museum.

The rarer an item, the more attractive it was to the collector and desired for the collection. Objects from the Americas or New World as it was then referred to, were particularly valuable at this time as Italians were not allowed to travel there without permission from Spain or Portugal. Instead, they explored this region vicariously through objects and the Medici possessed a significant collection of artifacts from the Americas, largely collecting featherwork.

Vasari intended the worldly representation in the guardaroba to be seen in relation to the larger cosmos, represented by a celestial sphere in the centre of the room and painted constellations on the ceiling. He also had grand visions of two large globes, a terrestrial and celestial hidden behind a false ceiling that could be lowered impressively via a pulley system into the room below. The room was also to display a copy of the 1484 clock made for Lorenzo de Medici by Lorenzo della Volpaia. An Antonio Santucci (b.? d.1613) armillary sphere that is now at the Florence Museum of the History of Science, was also displayed in the guardaroba along with a second, earlier armillary sphere that is now lost. It is the relationships between these objects and maps and the context for which they are shown that produces intended symbolic gestures; the clock, in relation to the maps, in relation to the celestial representations were an attempt to generate an effect of possessed knowledge over all space and time and in the case of the guardaroba, Cosimo I de Medici was to be seen as the possessor and purveyor of this knowledge, generating a narrative of his power.

A digital reconstruction of the room, as it was designed and described by Giorgio Vasari can be found here.

==== Old Chancellery ====
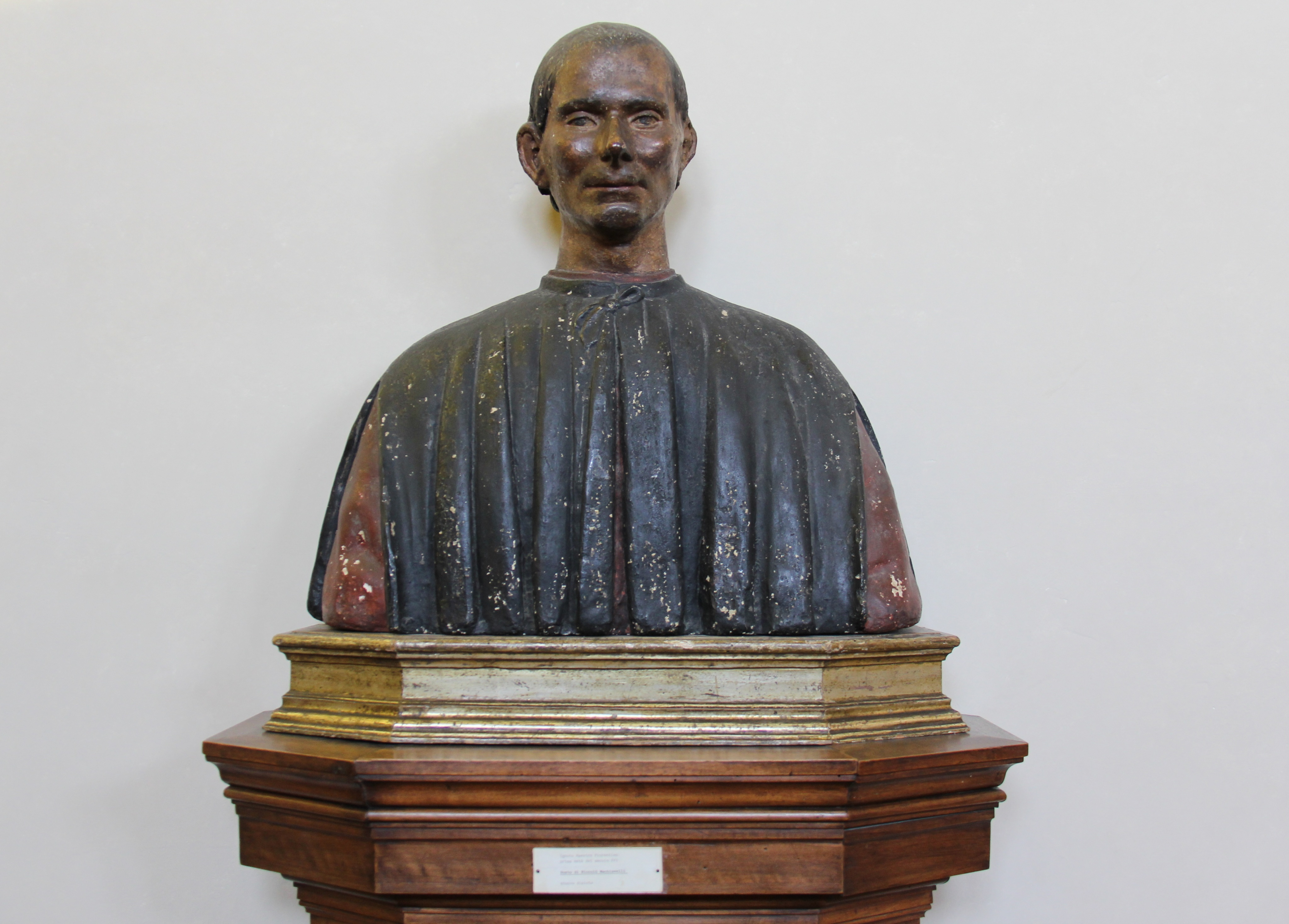
Bust of Niccolò Machiavelli

This was Machiavelli's office when he was Secretary of the Republic. His polychrome bust in terracotta and his portrait are by Santi di Tito. They are probably modelled on his death mask.

In the center of the room, on the pedestal is the famous Winged Boy with a Dolphin by Verrocchio, brought to this room from the First Courtyard.

== Mezzanine ==
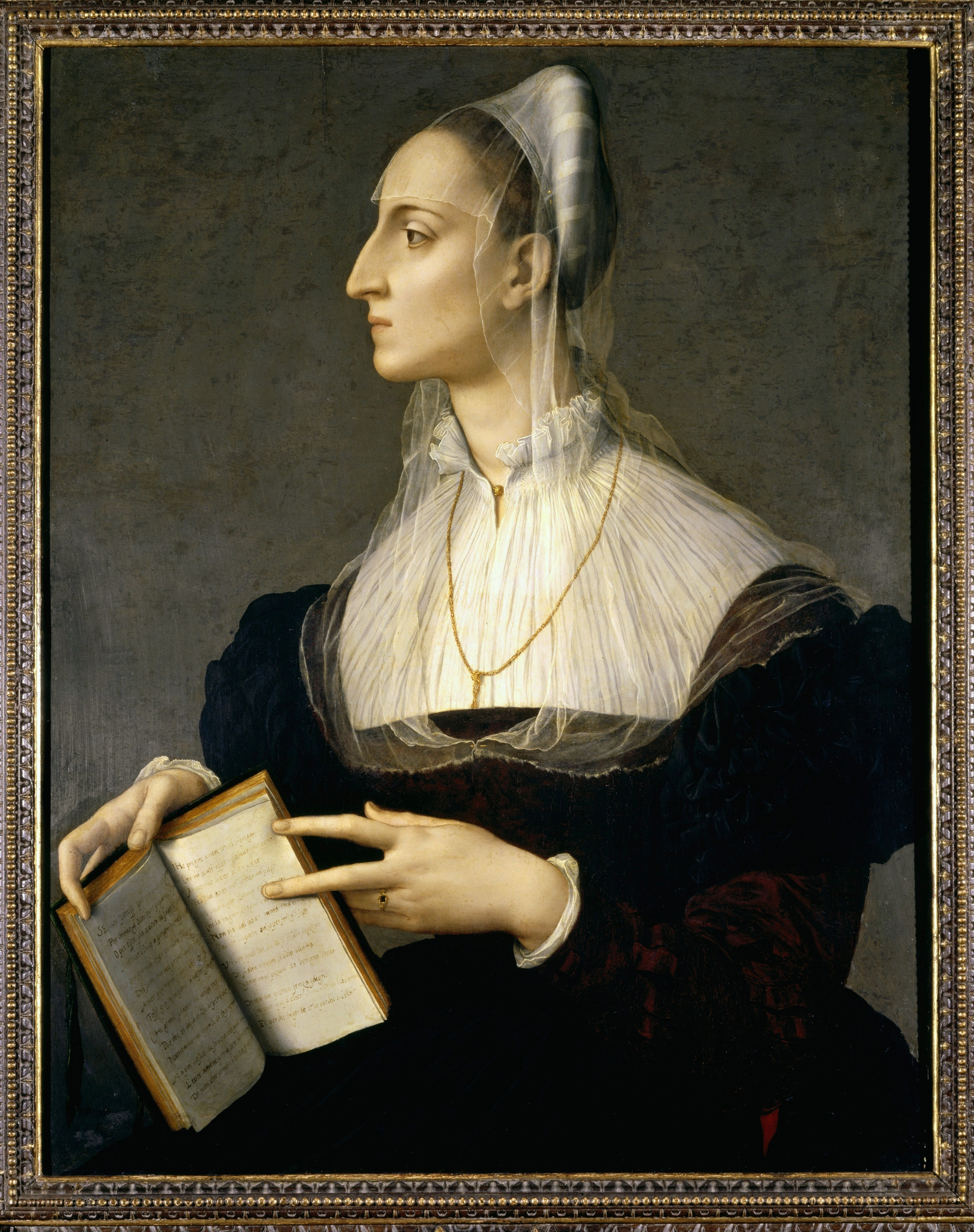
Angolo Bronzino, Ritratto di Laura Battiferri, Collezione Loeser

Located in between the first and second floors, these rooms are occupied by Renaissance and Medieval objects given in a bequest by Charles Loeser, an American expat collector and scholar. This collection is one of the most valuable municipal collections for its artistic and historical value. The rooms are located in the old palace, and were renovated in the mid-15th century by Michelozzo. It is the only part of the palace where the original 14th- and 15th-century ceilings are still entirely visible. Cosimo I's mother Maria Salviati lived in these rooms after Cosimo moved the family from Palazzo Medici to the Palazzo Vecchio (at that point Palazzo Ducale).

The first room holds a Madonna con Bambino e san Giovannino, from the school of Lorenzo di Credi, a Madonna col Bambino in stucco painted in the Florentine school in the 15th century, a Madonna in Adoration by Christ with Saint Giovannino by Jacopo del Sellaio, a Madonna and Child attributed to Master of the Griggs Crucifix (15th century), and a Madonna Enthroned by the Tuscan school of the 14th century. Above the stone steps is a little room that was for a time a studiolo for Cosimo I. The window looks out over Piazza della Signoria and the room is decorated with birds, animals, fishes, and vegetal elements works by Bachiacca.

The dining room holds one of the most famous works of the Loeser Collection, The Portrait of Laura Battiferri (wife of Bartolomeo Ammannati), by famous Renaissance painter Bronzino around 1555. Adjacent is another Mannerist work, The Portrait of Ludovico Martelli, by a follower of Pontormo, possibly Michele Tosini. There is also a small sketch on fresco, Battle of the Knights for Vasari's Defeat of the Pisans at the Tower of Saint Vincent, by a student Giovan Francesco Naldini, which used to be displayed on the balcony above the Salone dei Cinquecento by Vasari's complementary monumental work. By the fireplace are two Romanesque sculptures, a capital with an eagle (first half of the 13th century) and a Coronation Head (first half of 12th century).

In the corner room, three Madonna and Children paintings are on display. The first, Madonna and Child is by the Master of Saints Flora and Lucilla, from the 14th century. The second, Madonna and Child with Saint Little Saint John is a later Renaissance work by Spanish artist Alonso Berruguete from 1514 to 1518, and the third is Madonna and Child by prominent Sienese artist Pietro Lorenzetti. This room also holds Adoring Angel by Tino di Camaino from around 1321, a Bust of Saint Antonino in painted plaster from the 15th century, and an embroidery designed by Raffaellino del Garbo.

== Multaka network ==
In 2019, the museum joined six similar museums in Germany, the United Kingdom, Greece and Switzerland, creating the international Multaka network. This intercultural museum project organizes guided tours for refugees and migrants designed and offered for free by specially trained Arabic-speaking Multaka guides. The visitor-centered discussions with migrants in their language are focused on the historical origin and history of acquisition of cultural objects, including the visitors' own understanding of their country's cultural heritage.

== See also ==
- Italian Gothic architecture
- The Hydraulic Tower in Birkenhead Docks, Wirral, completed in 1863 is a replica of the Palazzo designed by Jesse Hartley who also designed the Albert Dock in Liverpool
- City Hall (Chicopee, Massachusetts), 1871, inspired by the Palazzo Vecchio
- Bradford City Hall, 1873, clock and bell tower based on the Palazzo Vecchio
- Palazzo Pubblico, the city hall of San Marino, 1884, likened to the Palazzo
- Eagle Warehouse & Storage Company by Frank Freeman and completed in 1894, a Richardsonian Romanesque warehouse in Brooklyn, New York which has been likened to the Palazzo Vecchio.
- Emerson Bromo-Seltzer Tower in Baltimore, Maryland, 1911, patterned after the Palazzo Vecchio
- City hall in Opole, Poland, inspired by the Palazzo Vecchio.
