= Mariano Graziadei =

Italian painter

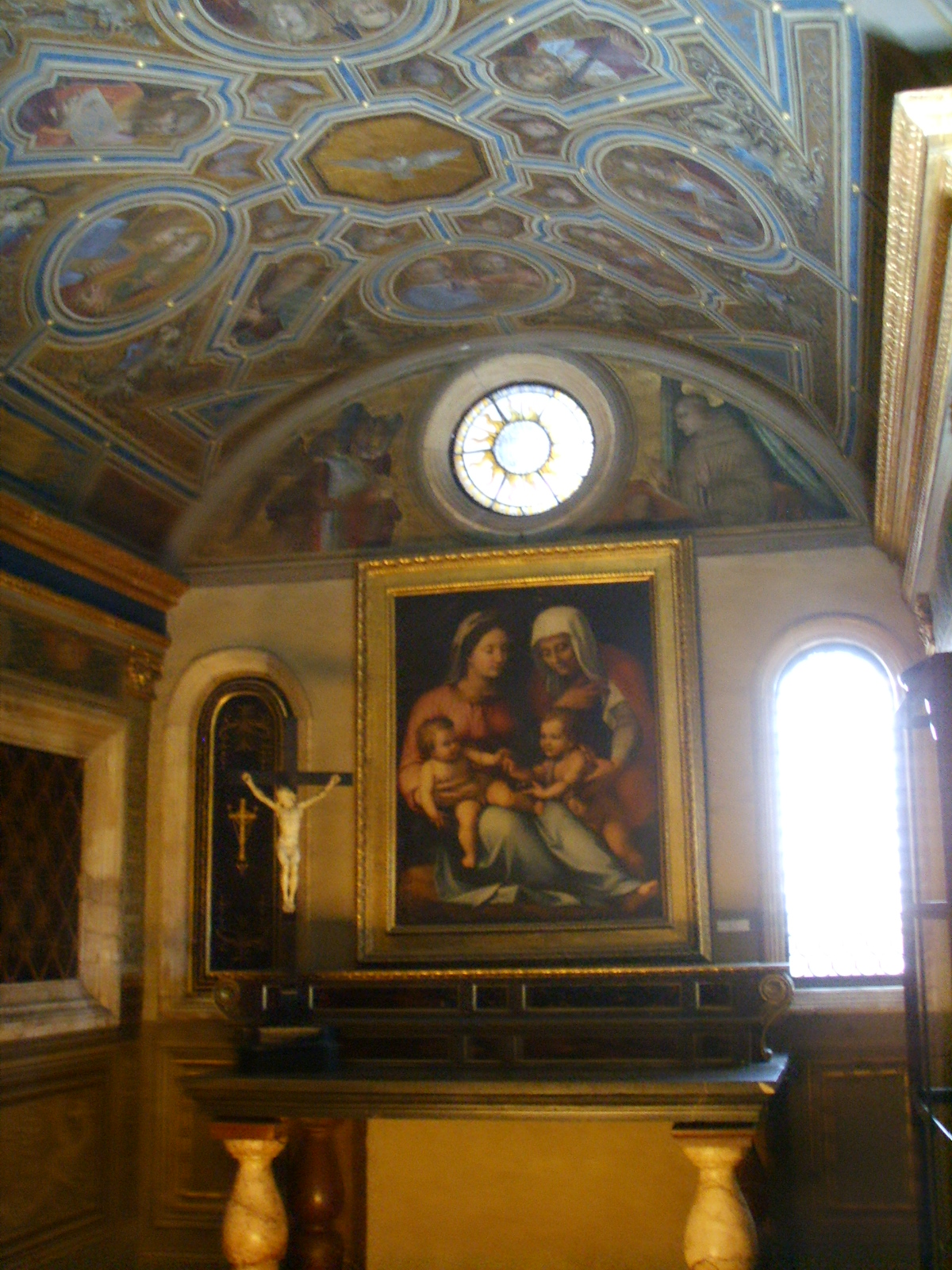
Altarpiece of the Holy Family in Capella della Signoria in Palazzo Vecchio.

Mariano Graziadei also known as Mariano da Pescia, was an Italian painter of the early-Renaissance period, active in Florence. He was born in Pescia, and trained under Ridolfo Ghirlandaio. He painted a Holy Family for the chapel of the Signoria in the Palazzo Vecchio of Florence.
