= Crossing of the Red Sea (Bronzino) =

Fresco painting by Bronzino

Coordinates: 43°46′09″N 11°15′23″E

The Crossing of the Red Sea
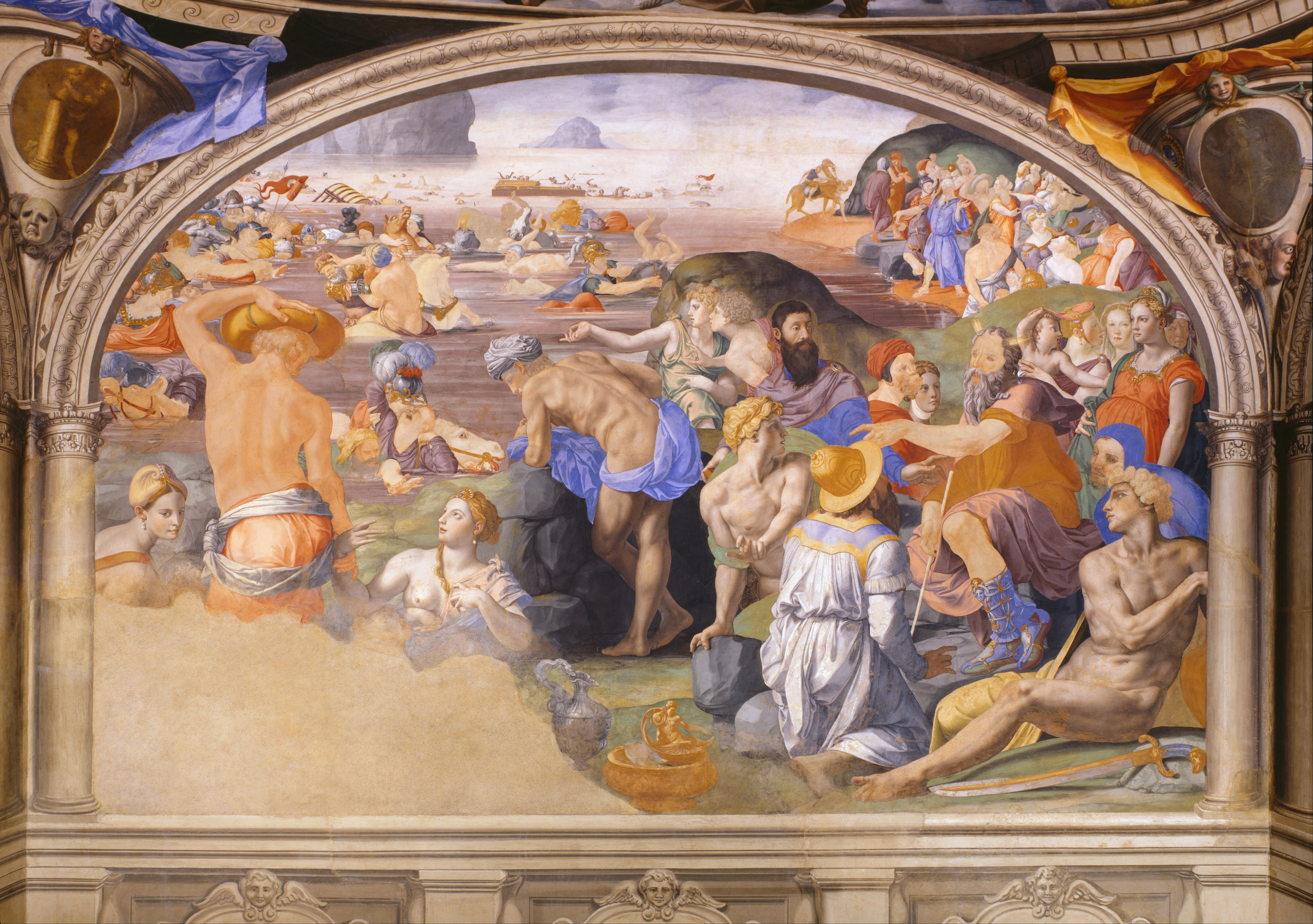
- Artist: Bronzino
- Year: 1542
- Type: Fresco
- Dimensions: 320 cm × 490 cm (130 in × 190 in)
- Location: Palazzo Vecchio; Florence

The Crossing of the Red Sea, also known as The Crossing of the Red Sea and Moses Appointing Joshua, is a fresco painting by the Italian artist Agnolo di Cosimo, known as Bronzino, finished in 1542. It depicts the Israelites crossing the Red Sea from the book of Exodus and Moses commissioning Joshua to lead the Israelites into the Promised Land from the book of Numbers. It is housed in the Palazzo Vecchio, Florence.

In 1540, Cosimo I de' Medici and/or his wife, Eleanor of Toledo, commissioned this and other frescoes for Eleanor's private chapel. Three of the four walls of the small chapel found on the second floor of the palace are covered with works telling the story of Moses.

== Composition ==
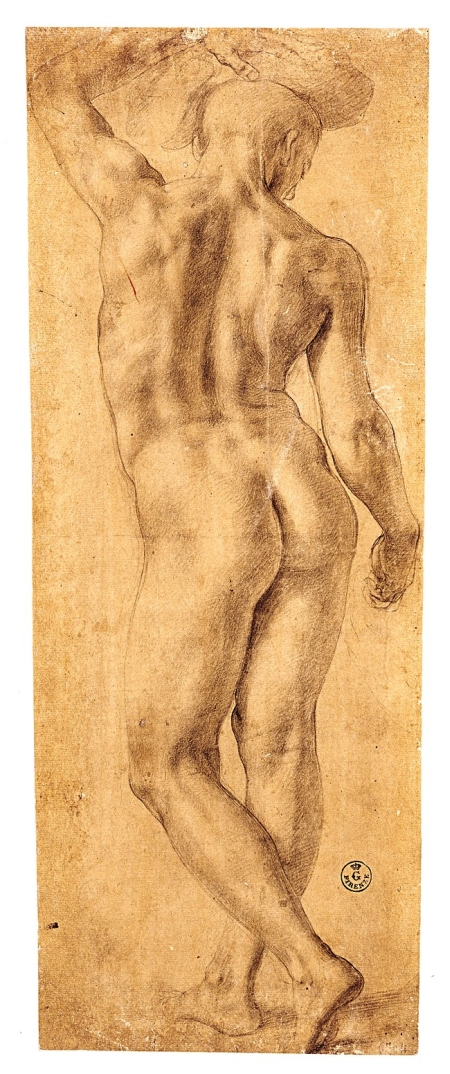
Bronzino. Standing Nude (study for The Crossing of the Red Sea). c. 1541. Uffizi Gallery.

The large fresco is an example of Maniera art and is found on the south wall of the chapel. It is framed by fictive architectural elements including columns and an arch that provide the illusion the scene is contained in a lunette. The spandrels in the upper corners boast medallions and draperies to complete the illusion. The damage to the lower left corner is due to moisture.

The fresco depicts three different scenes from the Old Testament. The three figures in the center foreground and three figures in the left foreground represent the Hebrew nation preparing to leave Egypt (Exodus 12:33–39). In the background, the Hebrews are shown safely completing their crossing of the Red Sea as Moses (shown in blue) gestures for the waters to return and drown the pursuing Egyptians (Exodus 14:21–29). In the right foreground, Moses, near the end of his life, is depicted laying his hand on Joshua and commissioning him to lead the Israelites (Numbers 27:18–23).

Bronzino's arrangement of the Hebrews in the foreground demonstrates his mannerist penchant for appropriating classical sculptural subjects in his works. The seated nude on the right is shown in the classic reclining pose of a river god. The semi-nude youth on the left with his back to the viewer contorts his body to grip the arm of a seated female while holding a bundle of unleavened bread on his head. The same youth can be seen reaching the far shore in the background of the fresco. Bronzino's study of a standing nude in the Uffizi was thought to be the work of Bronzino's teacher, Pontormo, until the 20th century. It is clearly a preparatory chalk drawing for the standing figure with the bundle on his head. His exaggerated thrust of the hip and raised arm are common mannerist motifs and one leg crossed behind the other is a signature pose of Bronzino's. The figure in the center leaning on a rock is shown with his legs similarly crossed. The standing figure's stance appears to be inspired by a Roman copy of a Greek bronze statue known as the Idolino. It was unearthed in a 1530 excavation at the Villa Imperiale of Pesaro where Bronzino was working at the time. Bronzino has replaced the gentle contrapposto of the ancient sculpture with a more artificial pose that is decorative and stylish.

Pontormo passed on his inclination to imitate Michelangelo to his student Bronzino. This can clearly be seen by examining the outstretched arm of Moses as he prepares to lay his hand on the youthful Joshua. The gesture is taken directly from The Creation of Adam in the Sistine Chapel. Reflecting on these idealized yet emotionally detached figures taking their inspiration from previous work, art historian Arthur McComb wrote:

It is hard to believe that we are here in a company of harassed Jews fleeing from slavery. This is rather a society of the elect, of youthful antique gods and fair Renaissance ladies. The sea to which these creatures of a marble formality have come is icy and still, and the arctic impression is borne out by color of a boreal coolness.

The damage to the fresco has obliterated much of the scene portraying the Hebrews preparing to leave Egypt. An anonymous engraving based on Bronzino's work that was published by Hieronymus Cock shortly after the fresco was completed includes the missing details. If these details accurately represent Bronzino's work, the scene depicts the standing youth encouraging two nursing mothers to rise up and begin the exodus. At his feet sit another child and bundles of supplies for the journey. Based on this evidence, art historian Janet Cox-Rearick has suggested that the ornate silver urn and gold basin in the foreground represent the Egyptian treasure the Hebrews took with them as they hastily prepared to leave.

== Symbolism and portraiture ==
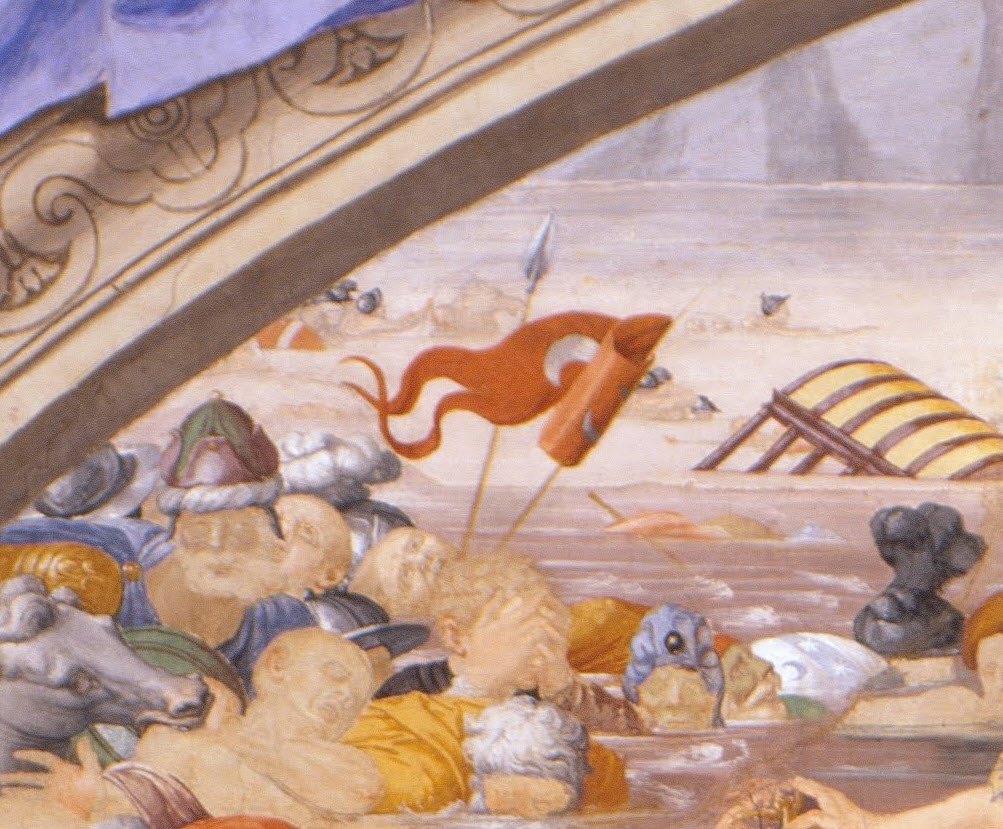
Detail of Strozzi coat of arms on banner amongst drowning Egyptians

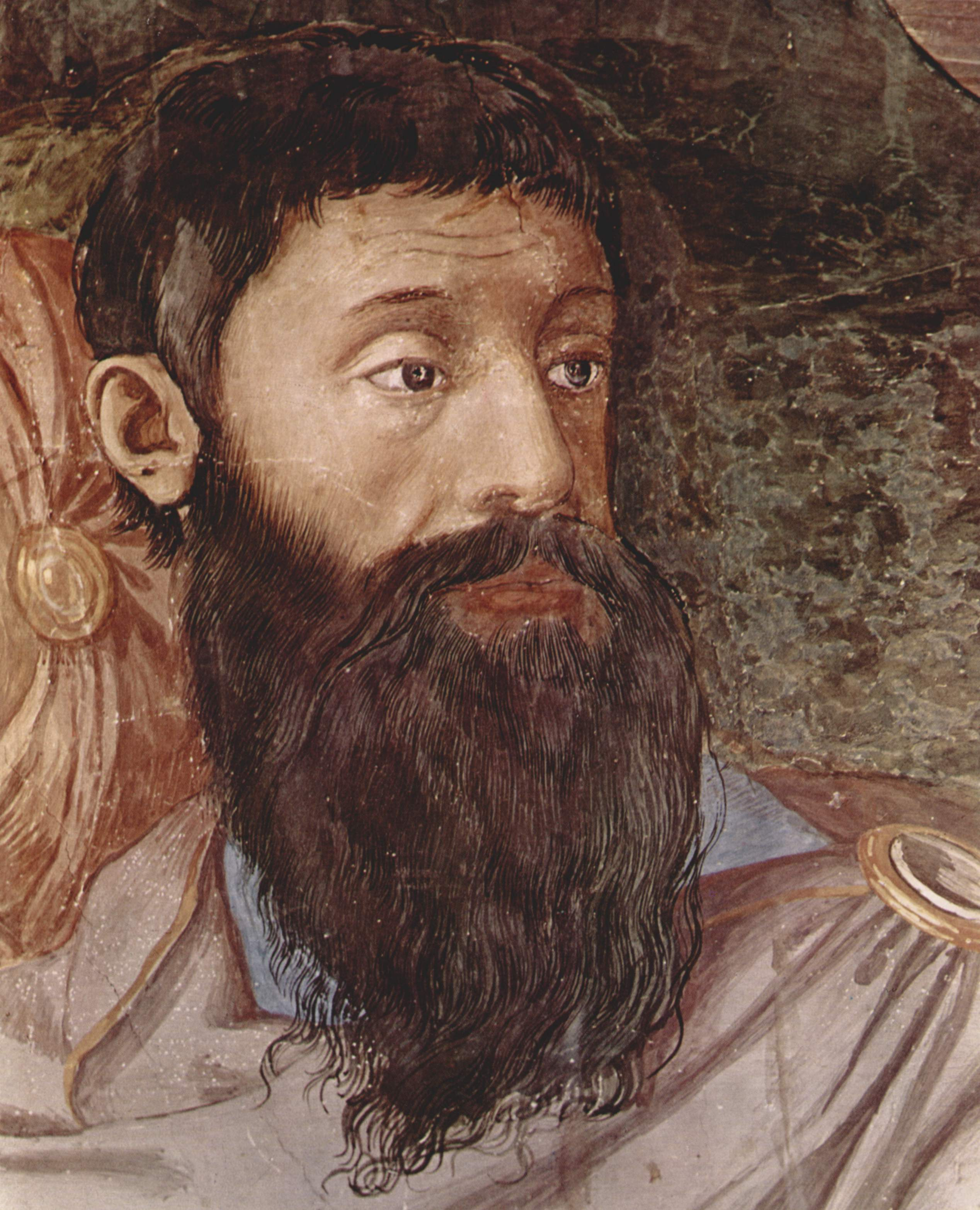
Detail of Pierfrancesco Riccio as the Old Testament priest, Eleazar

This painting contains various allusions to the Medici's dynastic and political intentions. Moses can be equated to Cosimo I, who wants to lead his people to the promised land. The crossing of the Red Sea and the destruction of the Egyptian army alludes to the 1537 battle of Montemurlo where Cosimo I defeated the army trying to restore the Republic of Florence. The symbolism pointing to the battle isn't particularly subtle. A red Egyptian banner in the left background shows a portion of the coat of arms of the Strozzi family, one of the principal factions opposed to Medici rule. The appointment of Joshua by Moses refers to the birth in 1541 of Francesco, the son of Cosimo I and Eleanor and heir to the ducal state. This last allusion is strengthened by the pregnant woman portrayed behind Moses in the right foreground.

Portraits of donors, political figures, and artists embedded in religious works were common in sixteenth-century Florence. It appears that three of the men surrounding Moses in the right foreground are portraits. Only one has been positively identified. The man with the long dark beard portraying the priest Eleazar is Pierfrancesco Riccio who served as both Cosimo's secretary and a priest at the Florence Cathedral. The man in the red turban is a scholar based on the black coif under the turban, and his Florentine identity is thought to be the writer Pier Francesco Giambullari. The man in blue who is looking out of the fresco at the viewer might be a self-portrait of Bronzino. It has also been posited that the man kneeling in front of Moses in the right foreground is Eleanor's father, Don Pedro de Toledo.
