= Heroic nudity =

Concept in classical sculpture

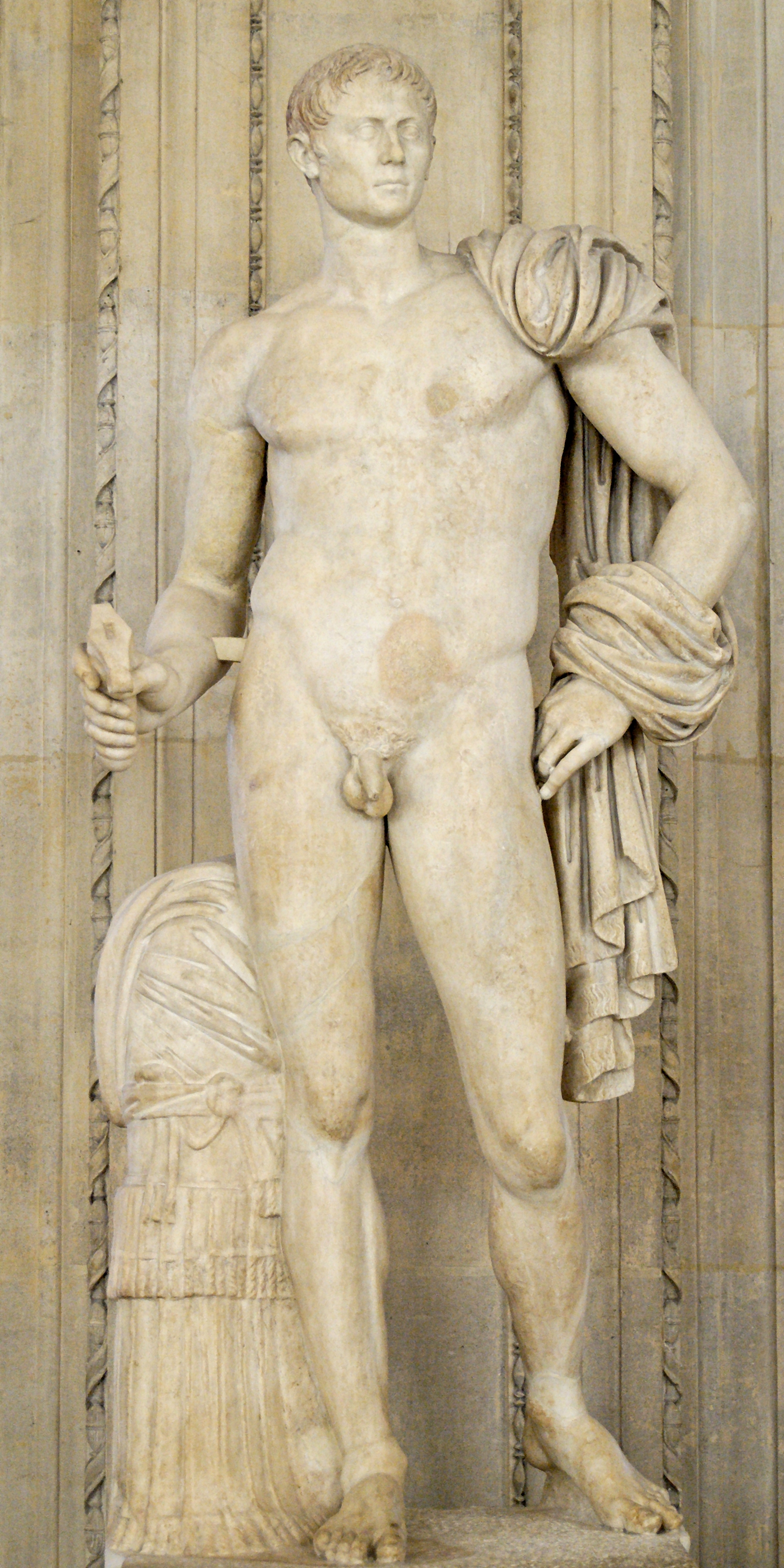
Heroic statue of a Roman general with the head of Augustus (1st century BC), Louvre, Paris

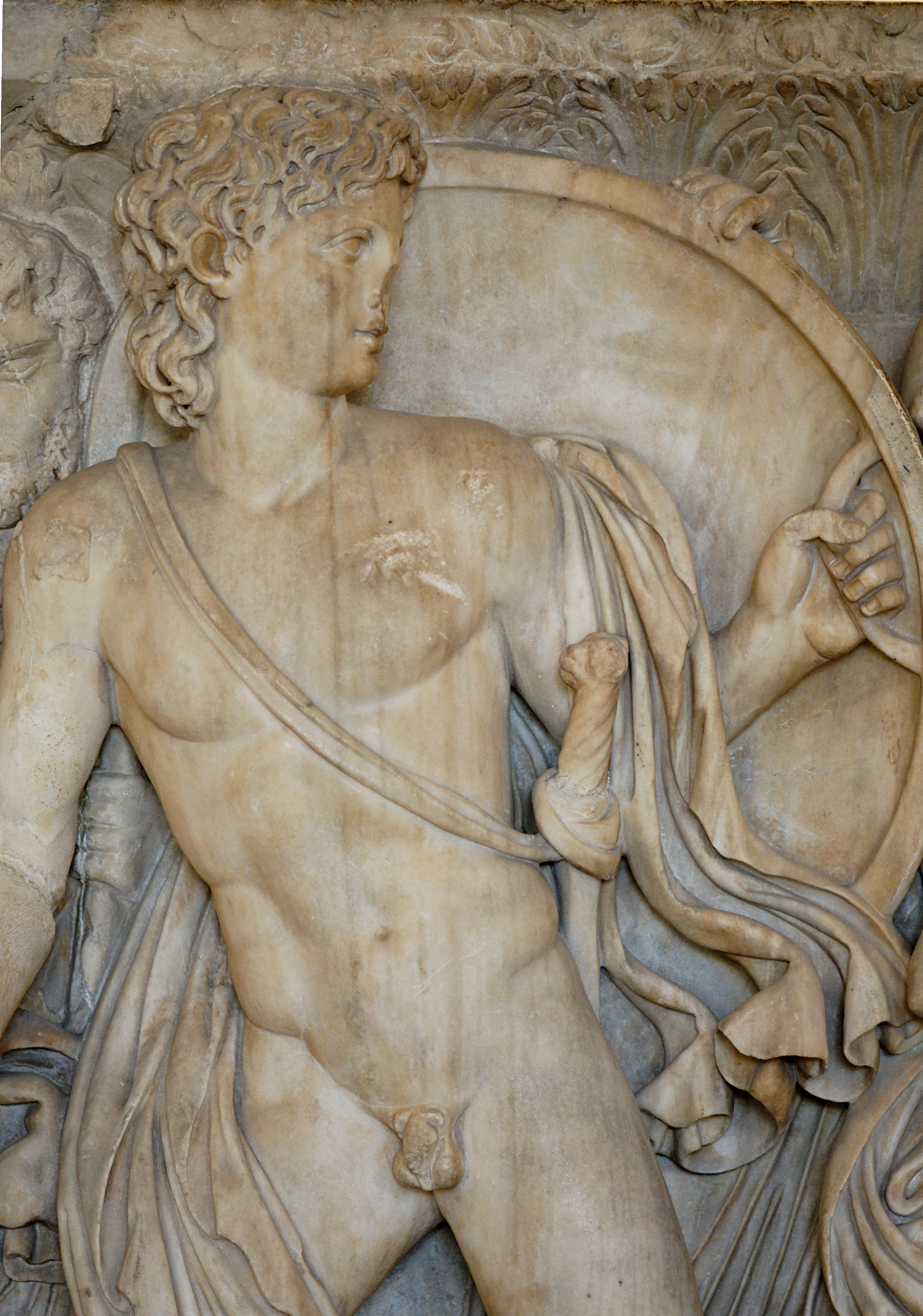
Achilles in battle gear, Athenian (c. AD 240)

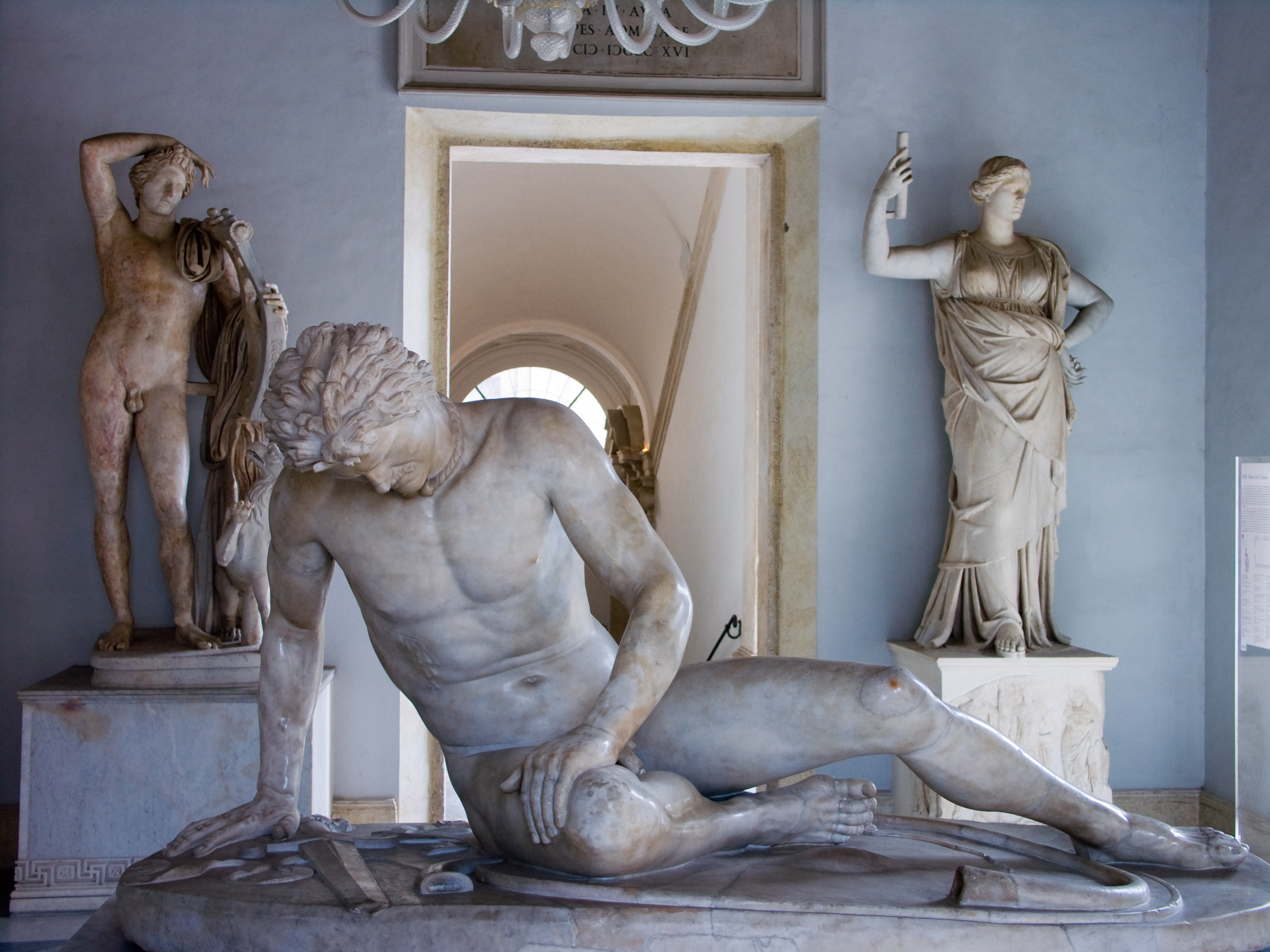
Dying Gaul statue (1st century BC), Capitoline Museums, Rome

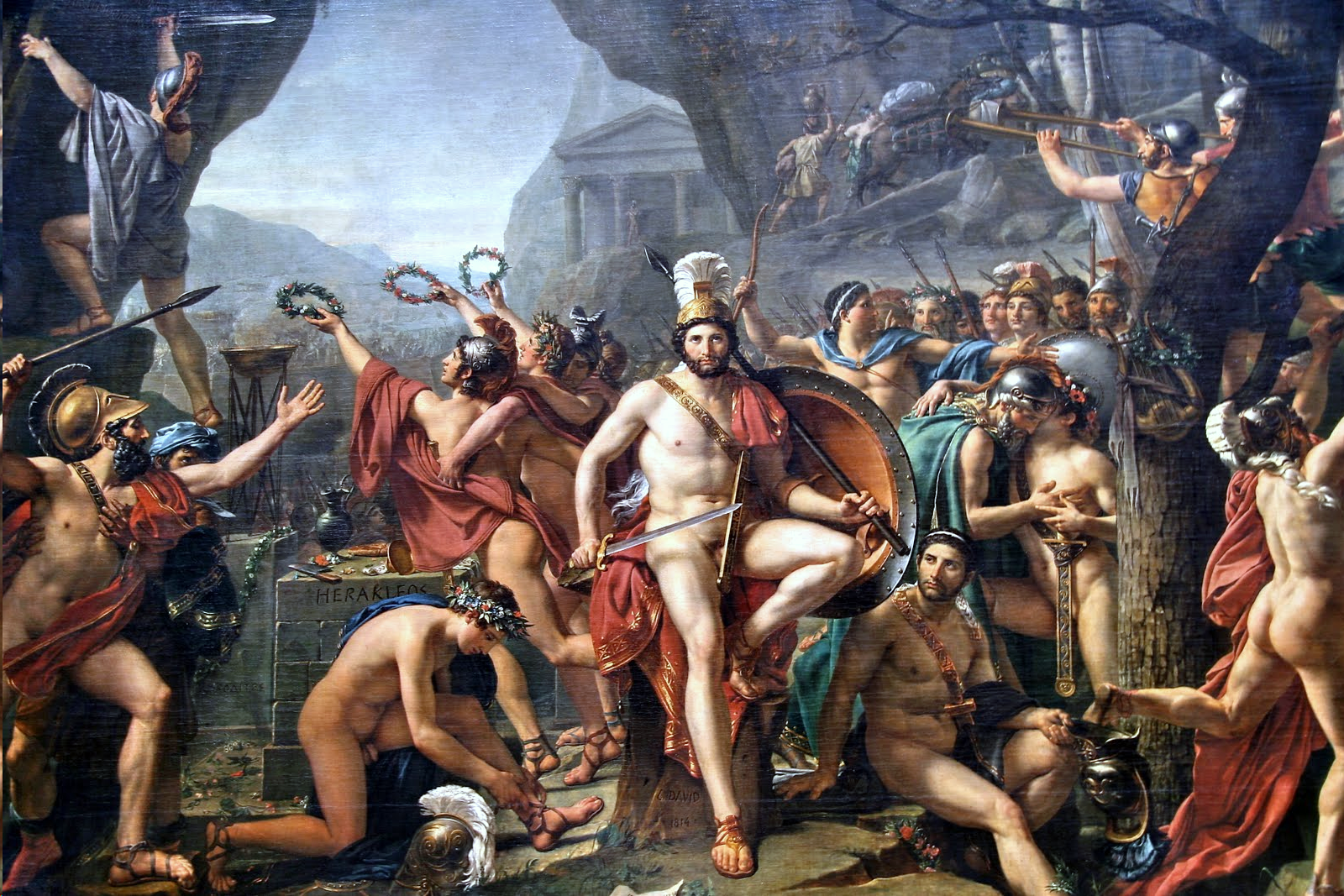
Jacques-Louis David: Léonidas aux Thermopyles (1814)

Heroic nudity or ideal nudity is a concept in classical scholarship to describe the un-realist use of nudity in classical sculpture to show figures who may be heroes, deities, or semi-divine beings. This convention began in Archaic and Classical Greece and continued in Hellenistic and Roman sculpture. The existence or place of the convention is the subject of scholarly argument.

In ancient Greek art, warriors on reliefs and painted vases were often shown as nude in combat, which was not in fact the Greek custom, and in other contexts. Idealized young men (but not women) were carved in kouros figures, and cult images in the temples of some male deities were nude. Later, portrait statues of the rich, including Roman imperial families, were given idealized nude bodies; by now this included women. The bodies were always young and athletic; old bodies are never seen. Pliny the Elder noted the introduction of the Greek style to Rome.

Agnolo Bronzino's painting Portrait of Andrea Doria as Neptune (c. 1530) and Michelangelo's statue David (1501–1504) were Renaissance examples. The convention is occasionally also described in the modern era, such as Antonio Canova's statue of Napoleon as Mars the Peacemaker (1802–1806) or George Bellows' anti-lynching lithograph The Law Is Too Slow (1923).

== The convention ==
Nudity was often thought to be an important aspect of Greek civilization and was frequent in places such as gymnasiums and when competing in games. At least by the Imperial period of Rome, this concept operated for women as well as for men, with females being portrayed through Venus and other goddesses.

Particularly in Roman examples like the Tivoli General or Delos "Pseudo-Athlete", this could lead to an odd juxtaposition of a hyper-realistic portrait bust in the Roman style (warts-and-all for the men, or with an elaborate hairstyle for the women) with an idealized god-like body in the Greek style. Male genitalia explicitly were not depicted as overly well-endowed to separate a noble and modest facade from the connotation in Greek culture that larger endowments belonged to more primal and barbaric characteristics.

As a concept, it has been modified since its inception, with other types of nudity now recognized in classical sculpture—e.g., the "pathetic" ("of Pathos") nudity of brave but defeated barbarian enemies like the Dying Gaul. Tonio Hölscher has rejected the concept entirely for Greek art of the 4th century BC and earlier.

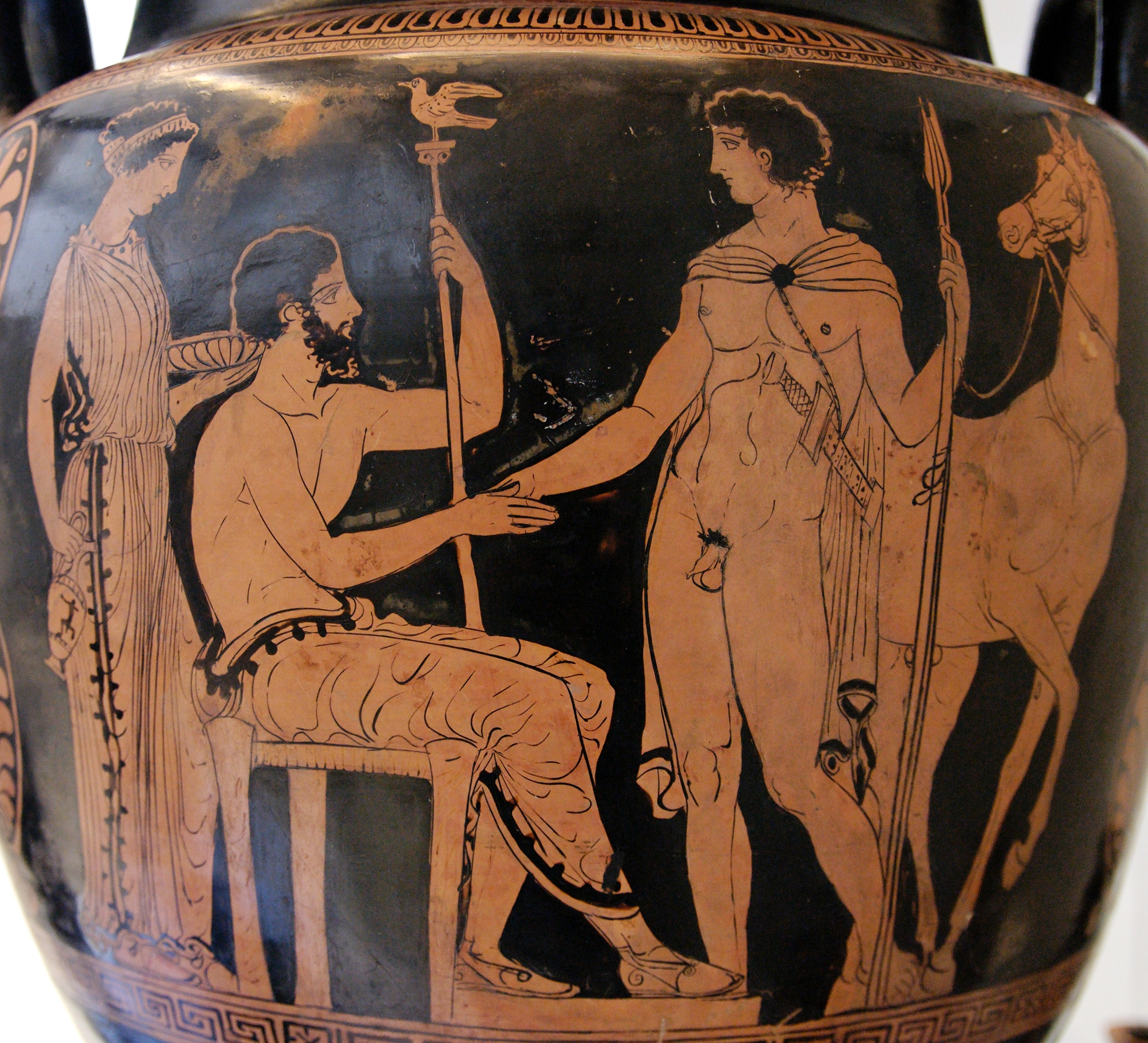
Arrival or departure of a young warrior or hero (maybe Theseus arriving at Athens and being recognized because of his sword by Aegeus). Apulian red-figured volute-krater, ca. 410–400 BC. From Ruvo (South Italy), British Museum.

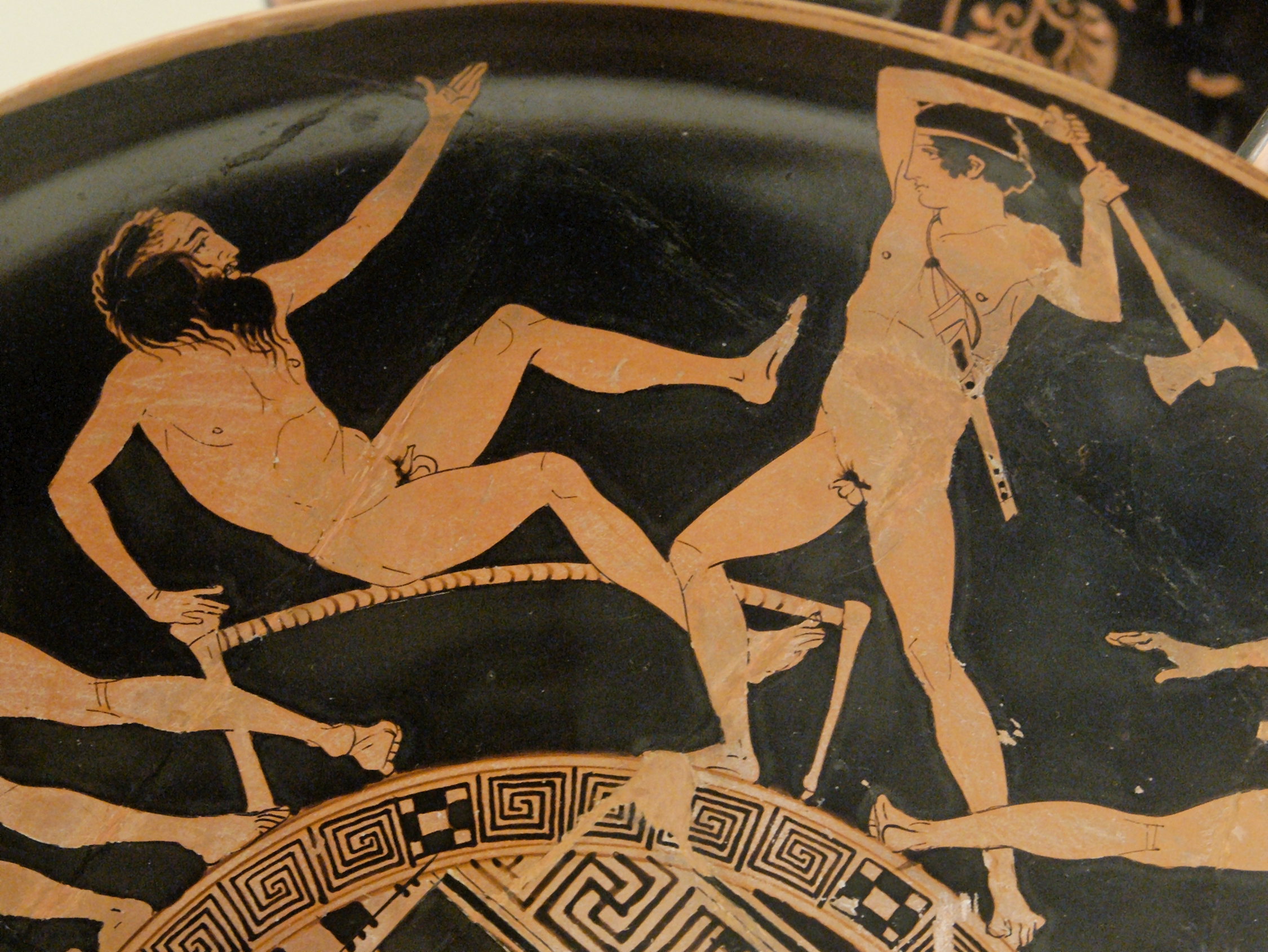
Theseus fighting Prokrustes, Attic kylix, c. 440-430 BC, British Museum

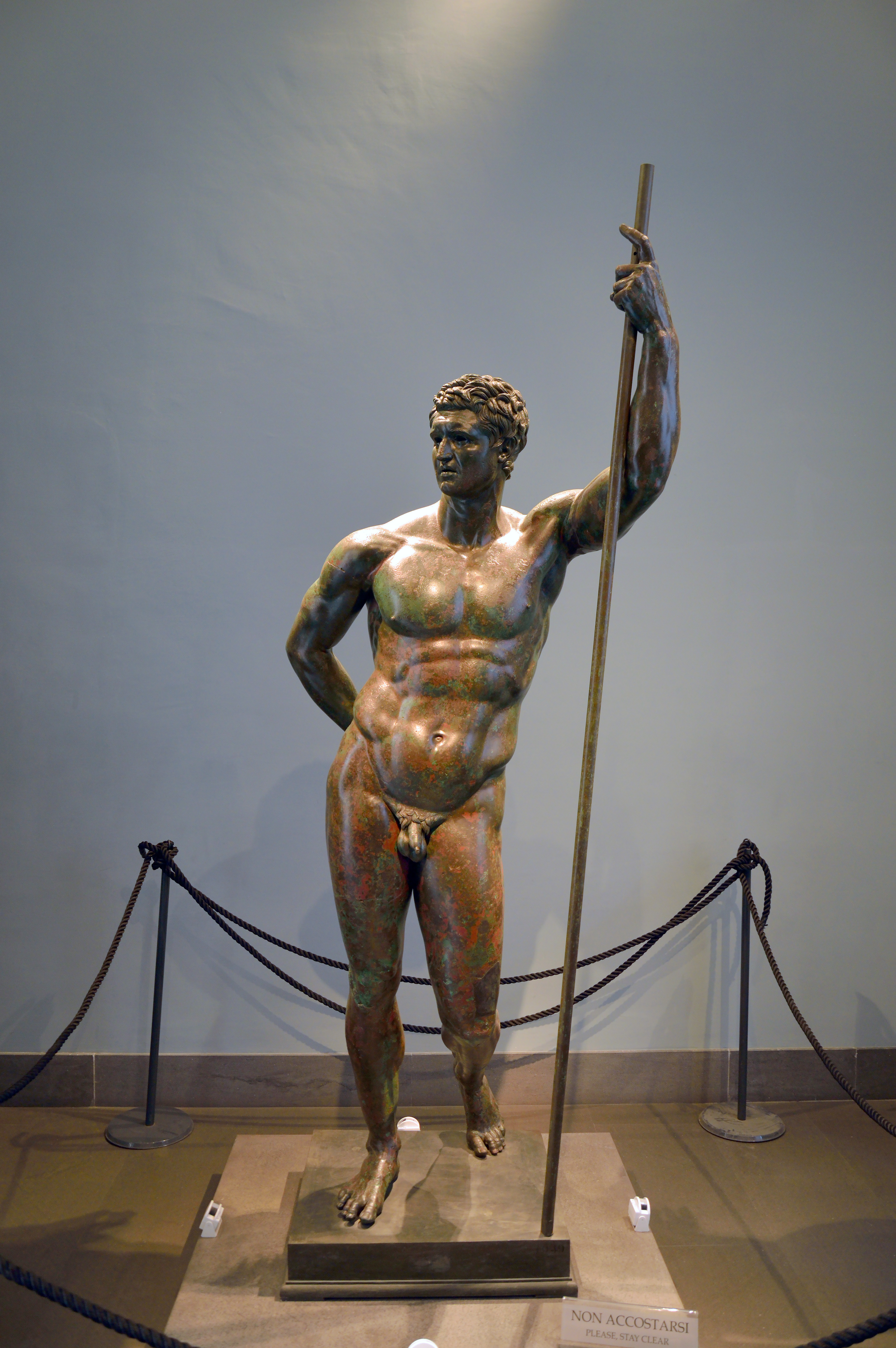
A Hellenistic Prince depicted in heroic nudity, National Museum of Rome

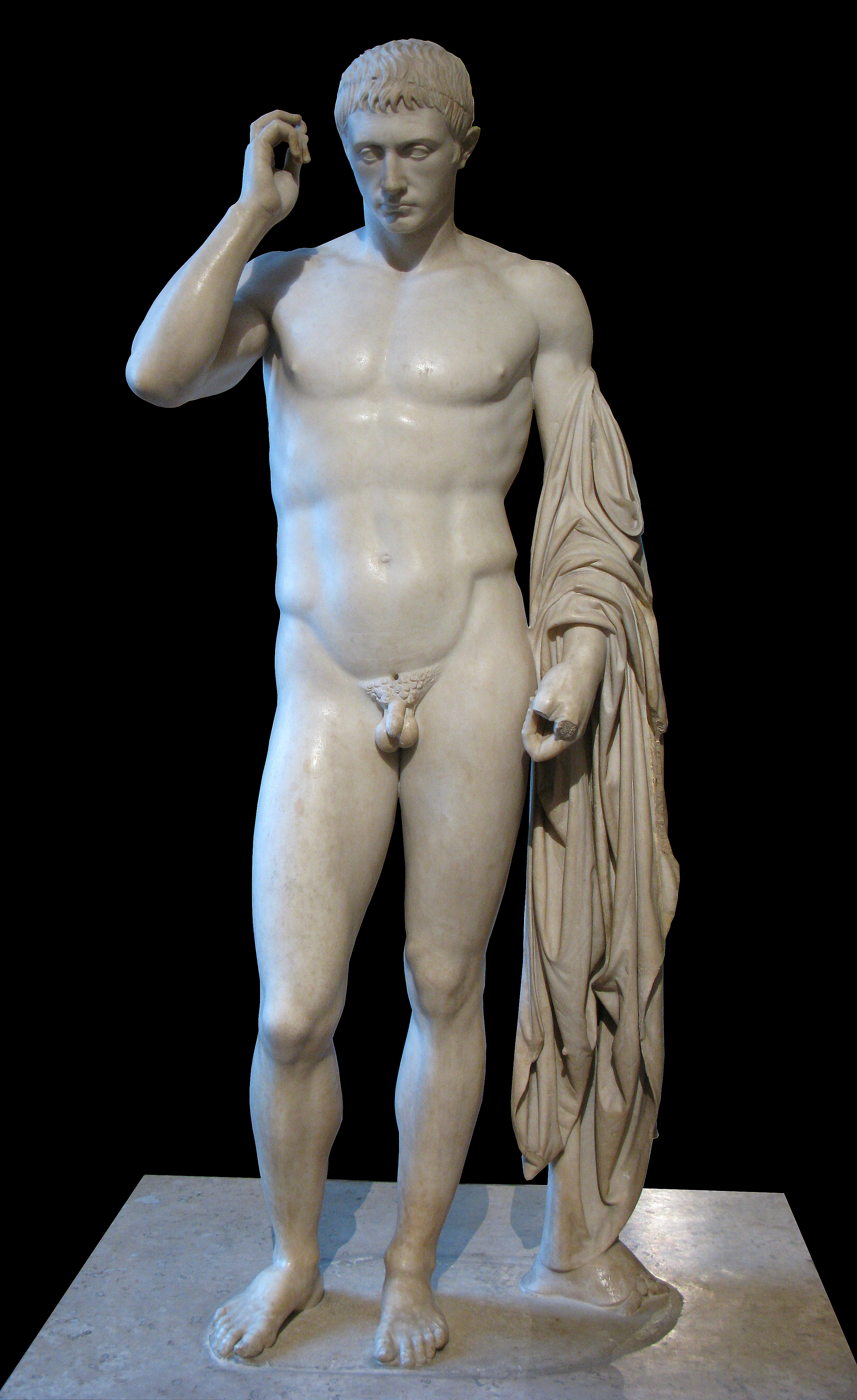
Roman statue with the head of Marcellus (1st century CE, after a 5th-century BC Greek prototype)

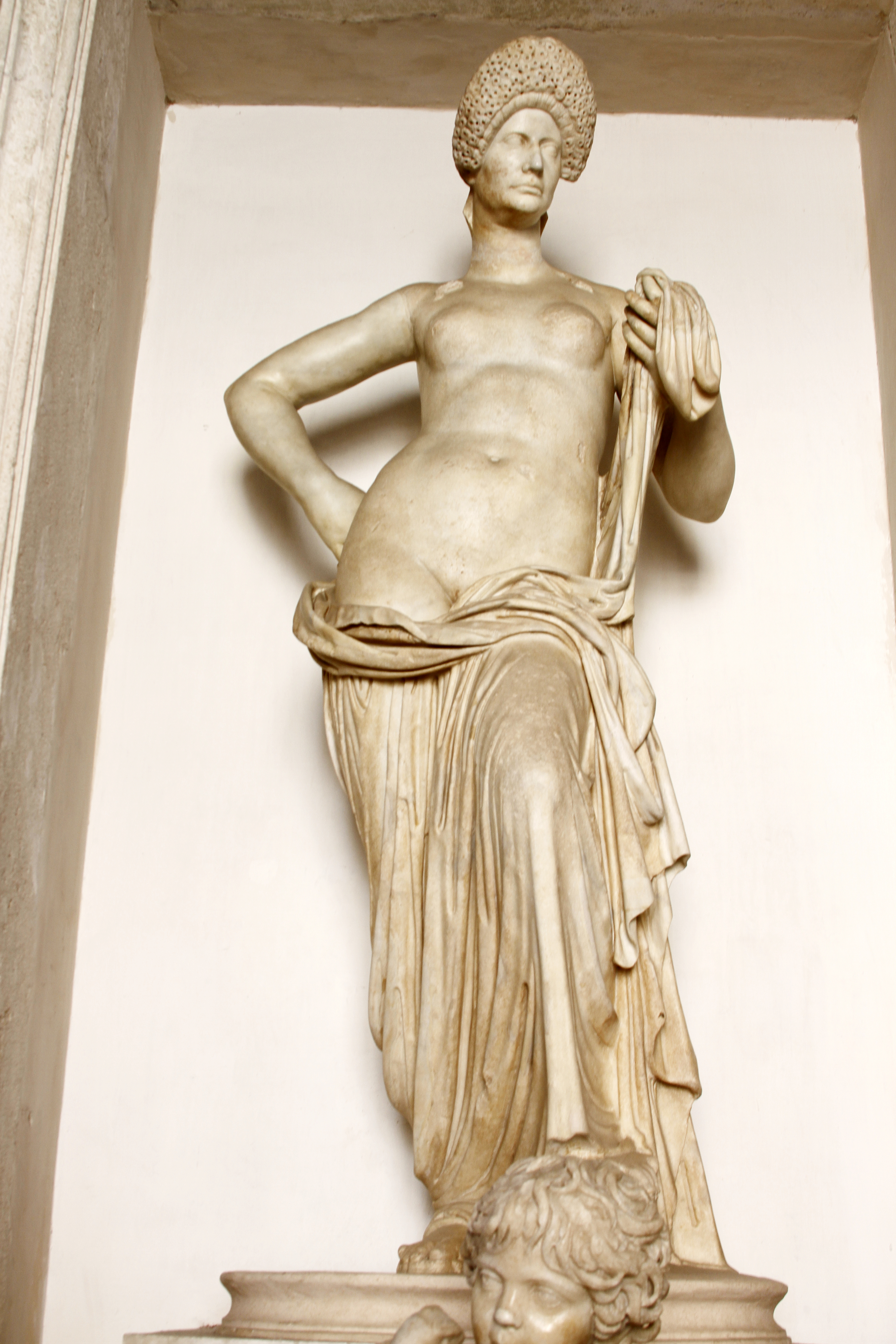
Fashionable Roman lady as Venus (MC245), Musei Capitolini

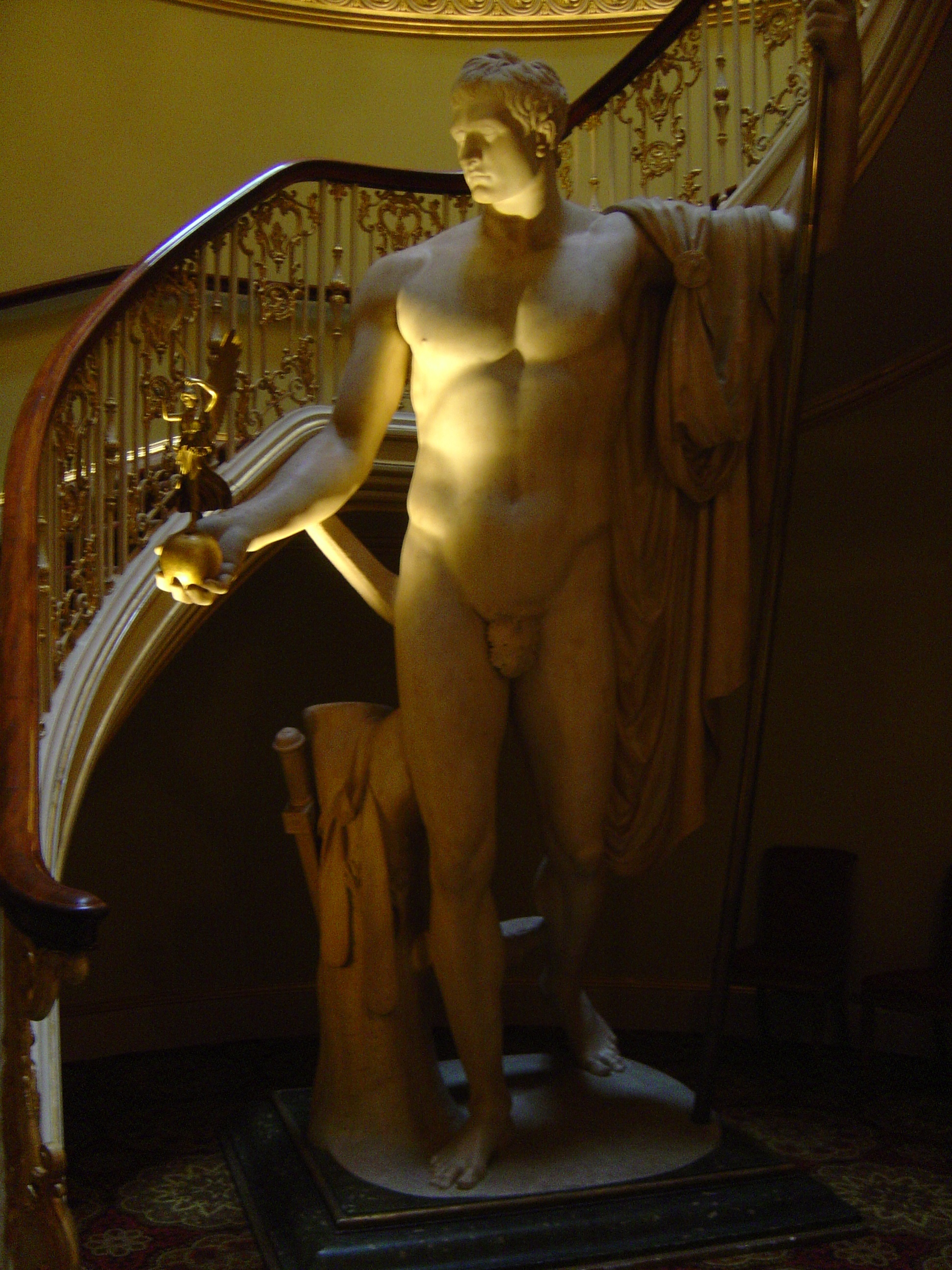
Antonio Canova: Napoleon as Mars the Peacemaker (1802–1806) - Napoléon en Mars désarmé et pacificateur, Apsley House, London

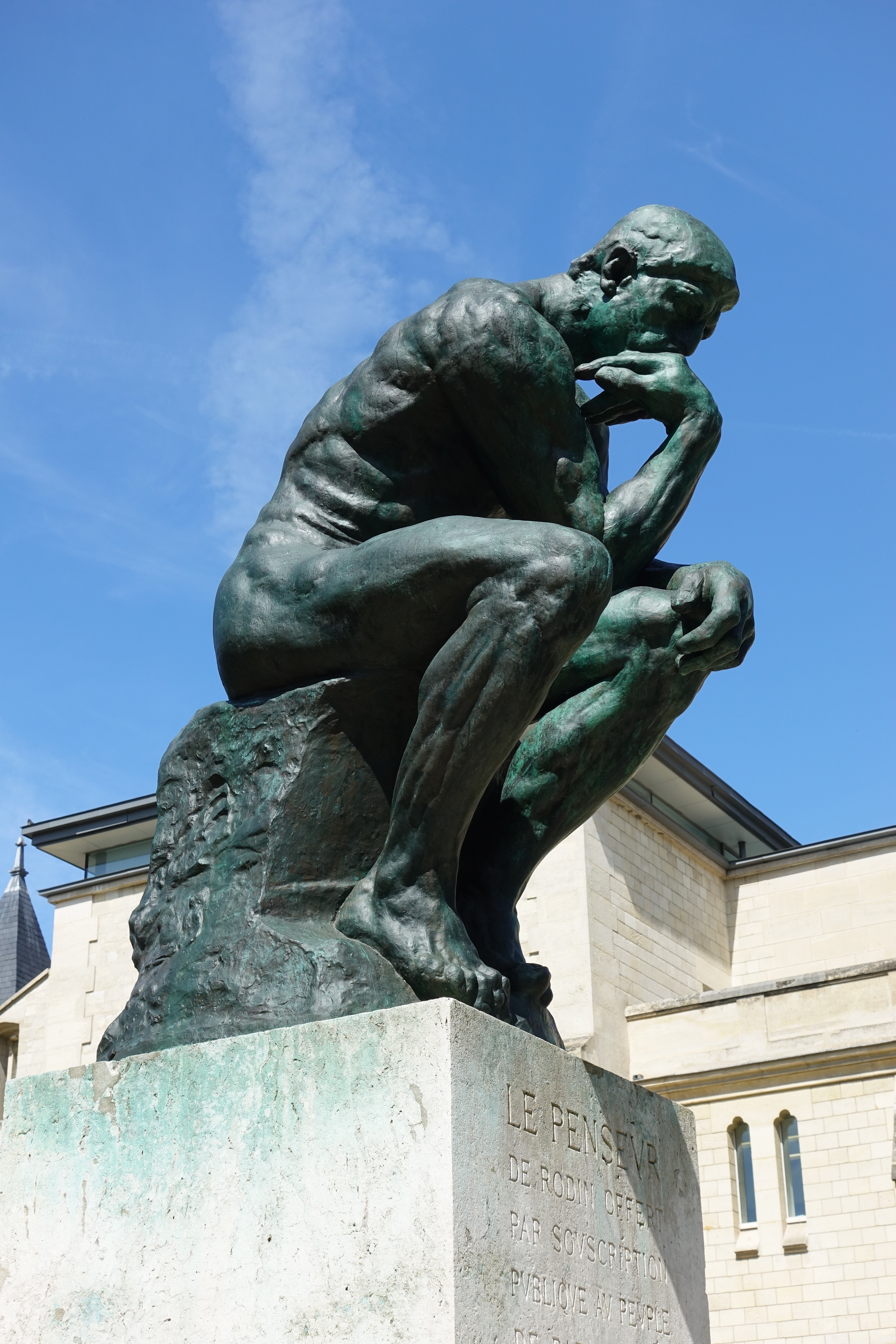
Auguste Rodin's The Thinker, here displayed at the Musée Rodin in Paris, is a well known example of nude heroic sculpture of the early 20th century

== See also ==
- History of nudity
- Depictions of nudity
- Fig leaf
