= Pseudo-athlete =

Style of Ancient Roman sculpture

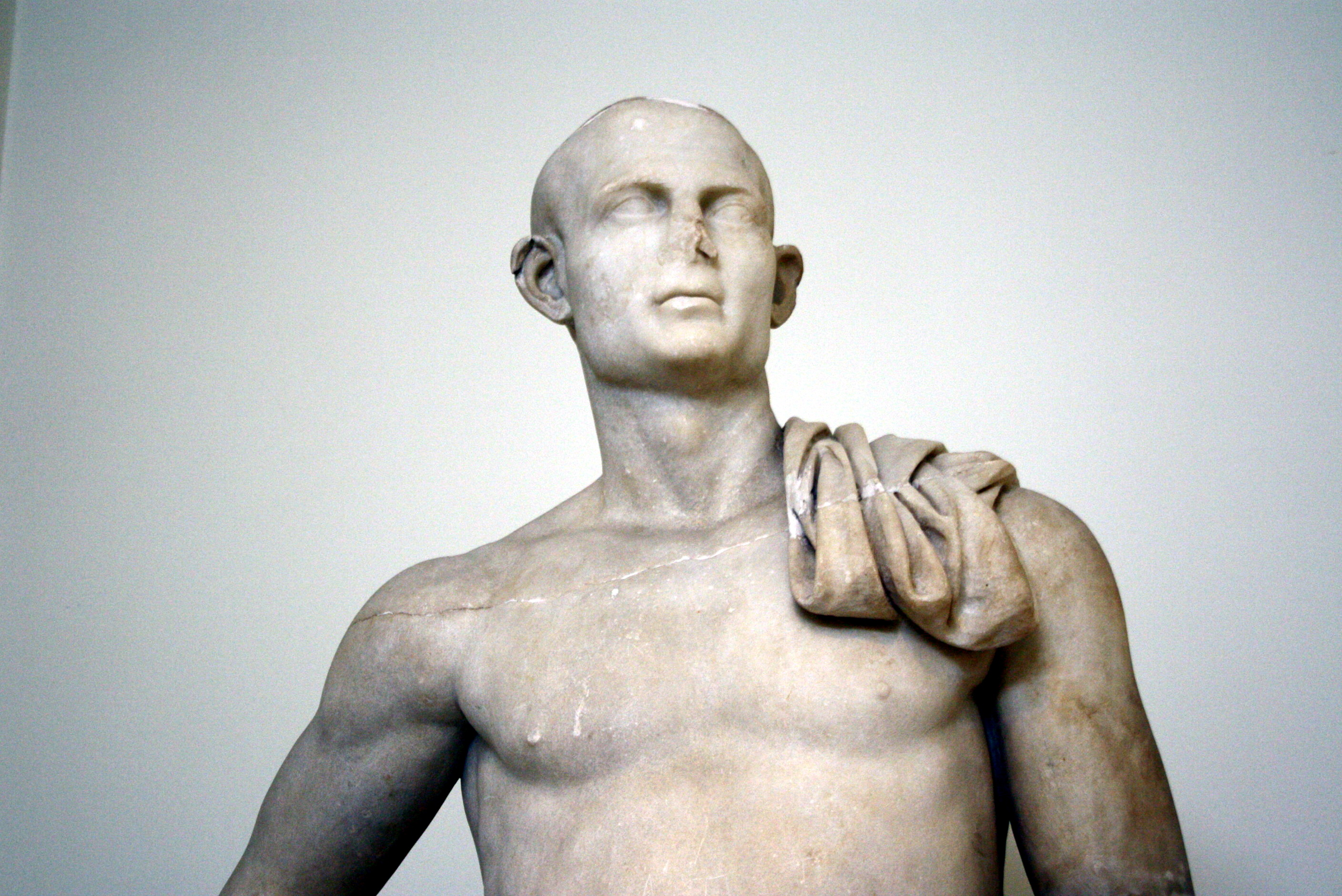
1480 - Archaeological Museum, Athens - Pseudo-Athlete of Delos - Photograph by Giovanni Dall'Orto Nov. 13 2009

The term pseudo-athlete is used to describe works of art from the Late Republican period in Ancient Rome that combine a veristic head with an idealized body that references Classical Greek sculpture. Verism is a style of Roman portraiture that portrays an individual with aging facial features, most notably sagging skin around the mouth and eyes, short-cropped or balding hair, and deep wrinkles on the forehead and around the eyes and mouth. These features were emphasized under the tradition of verism in order to stress an advanced moral and psychological consciousness that comes along with advanced age. The veristic features of the pseudo-athlete's head are juxtaposed with the figure's body, which is depicted in the guise of an athletic youth from Classical Greece. The pseudo-athlete's body is typically depicted in heroic-nudity with highly smooth muscular forms and are often shown in an active stance or standing in an S-shaped curve known as contrapposto.

== Potential origins ==
The origins of the Veristic style are debated (for more information on the various theories, see Verism). One common view is that the style was developed as a reference to the images associated with Roman funerary rituals. From Polybius's writings on funerary rituals we know that wax masks were created from the faces of the deceased in order to create an exact replica of their likeness that would be worn by someone of similar stature during the funerary ritual. These public funerals intended to honor the virtuous character of the deceased, emphasizing prized Roman values such as stern moral seriousness (gravitas), firmness and strictness of judgement (severitas), and determination and self-possession (constantia). It has been argued that in order to associate themselves with their honorable ancestors, living patrons began to reference the style of these funerary masks in their own portraiture.

The veristic style of Late Republican Rome came in contact with the idealized style of Classical Greece largely on the Island of Delos, where Greek artists and Roman patrons lived in close proximity. During the late republic, many Roman traders and merchants came to Delos to take advantage of its central location for sea trade, bringing their own artistic style along with them. These merchants had enough disposable wealth to afford portrait commissions from the local Greek artists that were familiar with sculpting in the idealized style of Classical Greece, thus causing the two drastically different styles to merge in a way that may appear semi-awkward to the modern eye. Scholars like Tom Stevenson have also credited the origins of the pseudo-athlete to the desire of Roman patrons on the island of Delos to be depicted with both the energy and passion of youth that is valued by Greeks along with wisdom of age that Romans value. This led to the creation of portrait sculptures that combine a veristic head and youthful body.

== Roman examples ==
=== Pseudo-Athlete of Delos ===
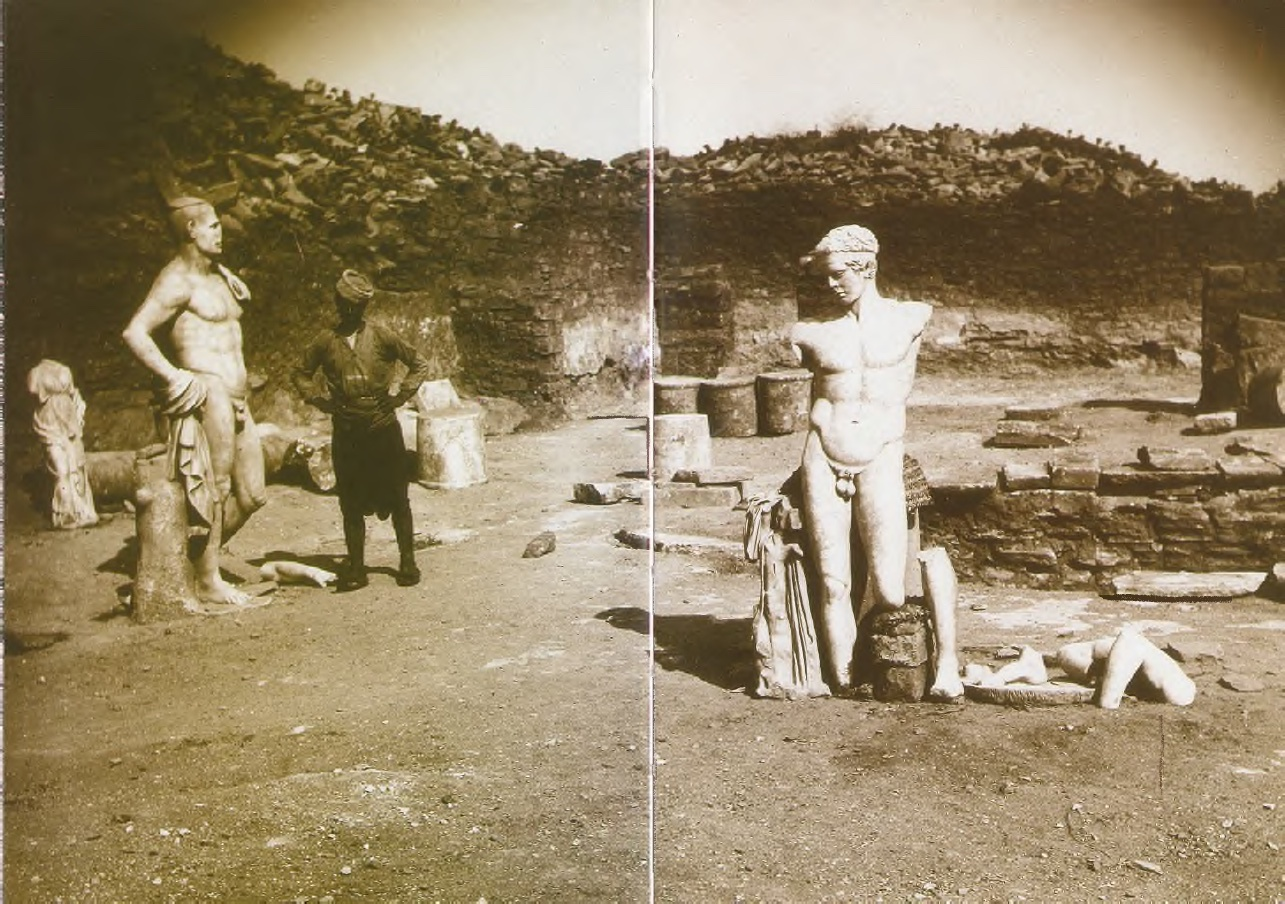
Pseudo-athlete of Delos (left), together with Diadumenos, shortly after their discovery in 1894. The Search for Ancient Greece (pp. 4–5) by Roland and Françoise Étienne, "Abrams Discoveries" series.

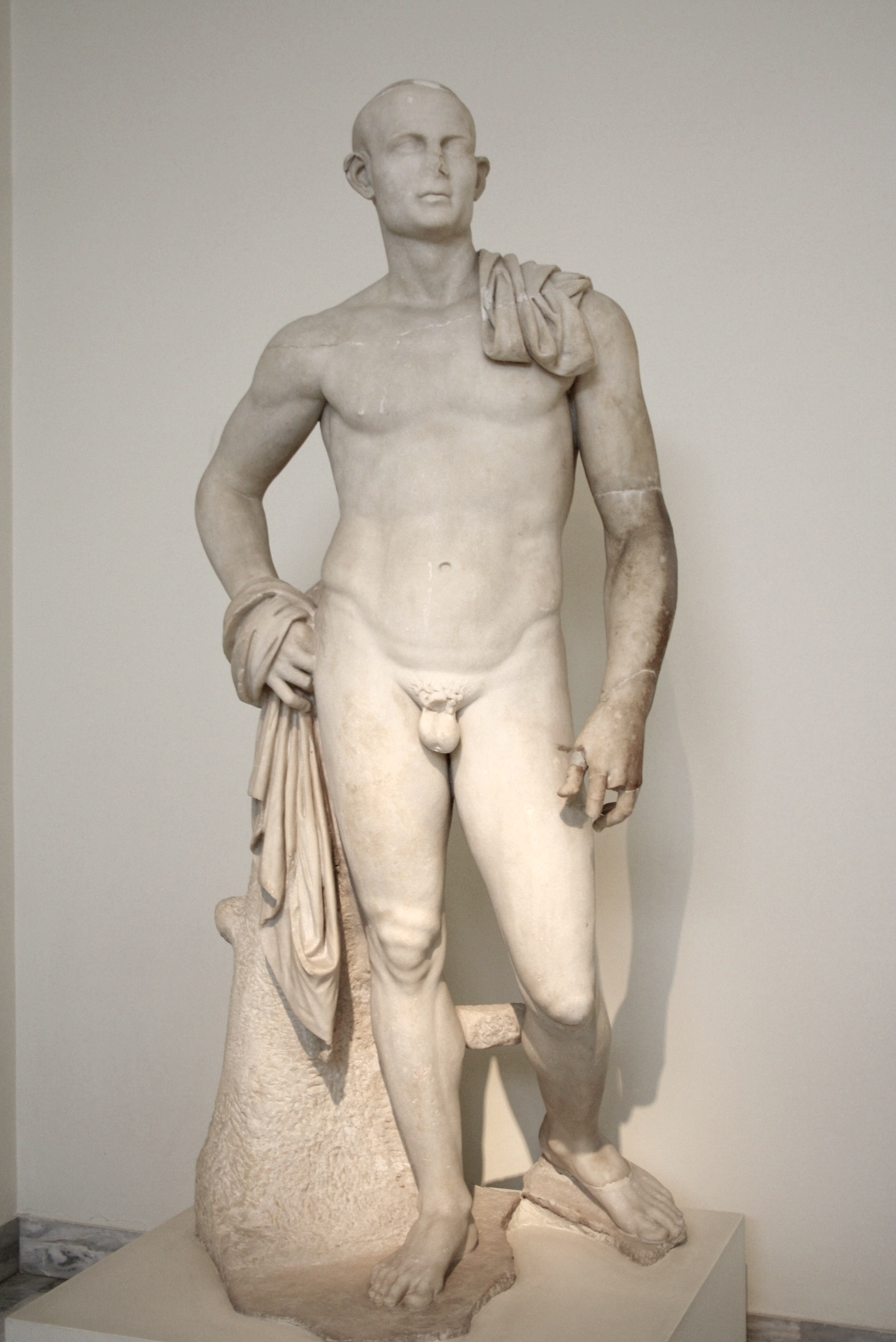
1477 - Archaeological Museum, Athens - Pseudo-Athlete of Delos, 80 AD ca. - Photo by Giovanni Dall'Orto,

The Pseudo-athlete of Delos is a larger than life-size nude male portrait measuring 7 feet and 5 inches tall (about 2.26 meters) that is dated to around 100 BCE. It was found in a house on the Greek island of Delos that the French excavators who discovered the sculpture have dubbed the House of the Diadoumenos, since a copy of Polykleitos's sculpture of an athlete binding his hair (The Diadoumenos) was discovered at the same site. The sculpture depicts the Roman businessman or potential slave trader that owned the house and had enough disposable wealth to commission a portrait of himself. The bust of the sculpture follows the tradition of Roman veristic portraiture, most notably in the figure's balding head, large ears, the subtle wrinkles on his forehead and at the corners of his mouth, as well the sagging skin around his neck and chin.

The Pseudo-athlete's body departs from the Roman Republican tradition and more closely resembles sculptures of athletic youth from Classical Greece. The figure's body is smoothed over with idealized musculature that does not match the figure's aged face. The sculpture also depicts the patron in contrapposto, or a stance in which the figure's weight is distributed unequally on their two feet, creating a naturalistic "s-shaped" curve of the body. The Pseudo-Athlete of Delos plants the bulk of his weight on right foot, while his left foot lifts up slightly off the ground in a subtle stride. Scholars of Roman art like Fred Kleiner note that the stance of the Pseudo-athlete is drawn directly from the stance of the Diadoumenos, since the figure's weight is distributed in a similar manner. The weight of the marble of the Pseudo-Athlete is even supported by a tree-trunk shaped strut located next to the figure's right leg that mimics the one seen on Polykleitos's Diadoumenos. Other scholars like J. J. Politt have interpreted the body of the figure as a reference to the muscular torso of Hermes, the Italian counterpart to the Roman god Mercury who was the patron God of businessmen and is often associated directly with the traders on the island of Delos, like the patron of this sculpture.

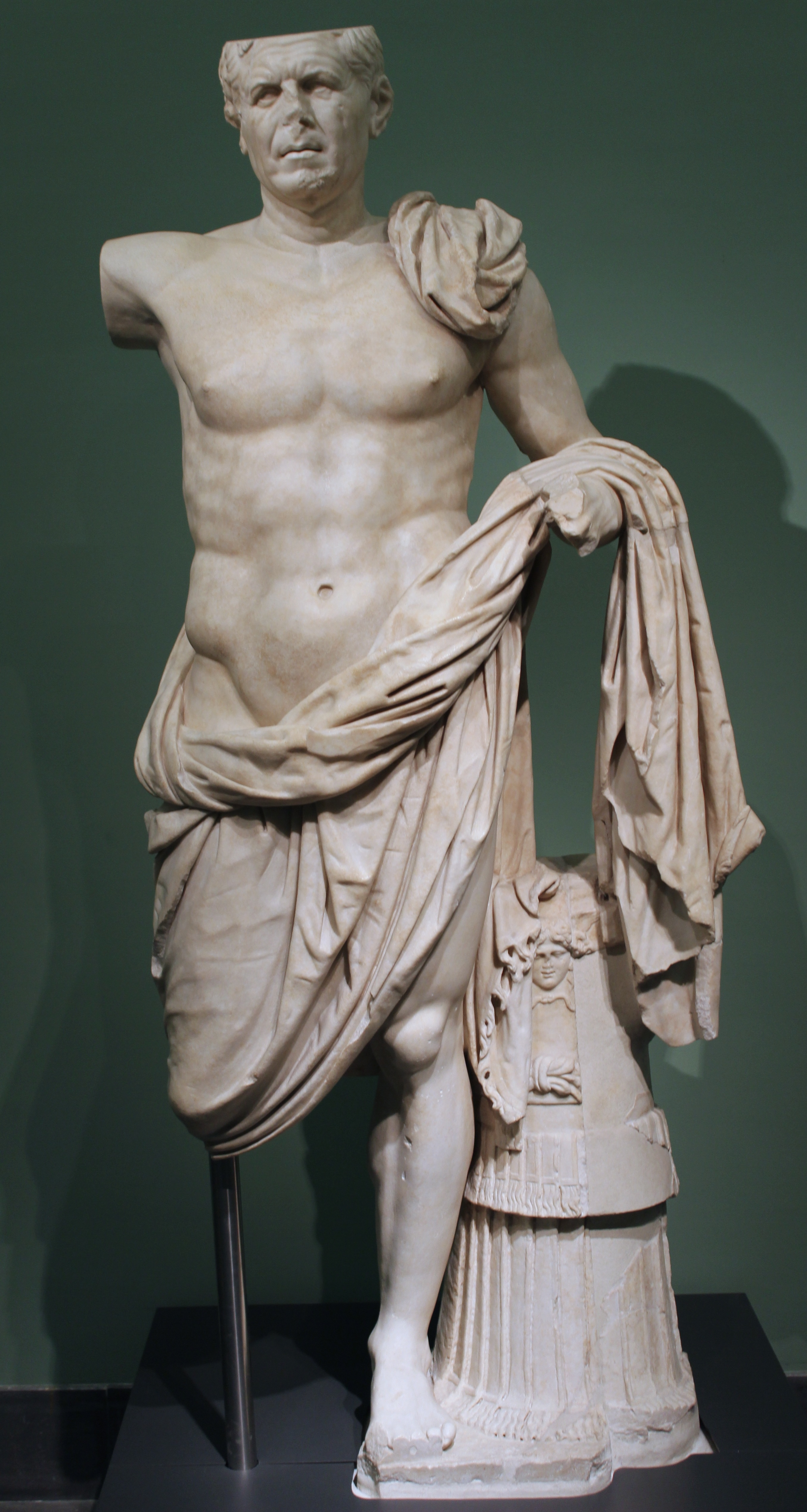
General de Tivoli (Massimo) 01

Other than its veristic head, the Pseudo-athlete of Delos references the tradition of Roman portraiture because of its inclusion of the draped fabric. A traditional Greek nude is shown completely bare, but Roman portraits were almost always clothed, since public displays of nudity were typically associated with condemned criminals that were stripped as a form of shaming, or slaves who were displayed naked during trades. While the Pseudo-Athlete is depicted nude, the drapery of the fabric serves as a nod to the Roman tradition of depicting the drapery of Roman garments, even with the distinctly un-Roman nude form. In this way the simultaneous inclusion of draped fabric and a nude form represents another merger of Roman and Greek portrait traditions within the Pseudo-athlete of Delos.

=== Tivoli General ===
In Tivoli, at the Sanctuary of Hercules, a pseudo-athlete portrait of a general was found. The marble sculpture with a veristic Roman head and idealized Greek body dates back to 75-50 BCE. To show his rank in the army and hold up the heavy marble statue, there is a cuirass at his side. His typical Republican stern and wrinkled face is contrasted by a youthful almost nude body that exudes power and is in the tradition of a Hellenistic ruler. Through the reference back to Greek idealized body, the patron expresses cultural superiority. The general exudes modesty by using a draped cloth to cover his genitals.

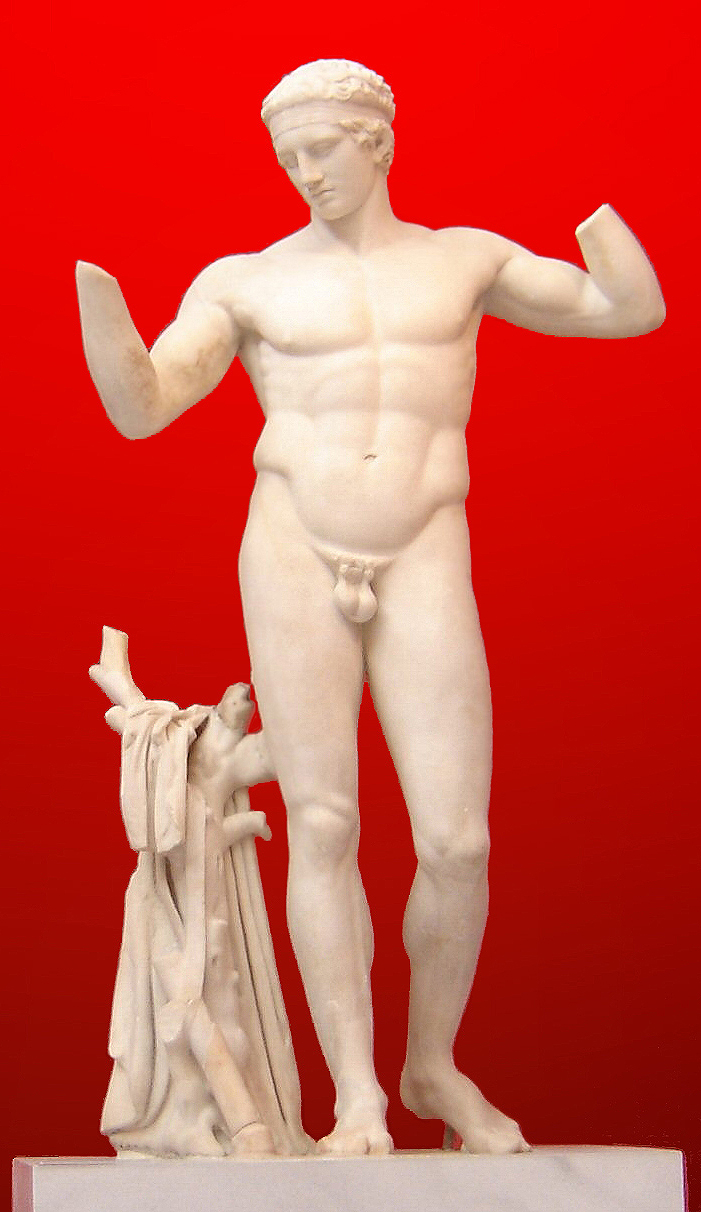
Diadoumenos (Statue of an Athlete Binding His Hair), 1st Century BCE copy of an original by Polykleitos from 450-425 BCE

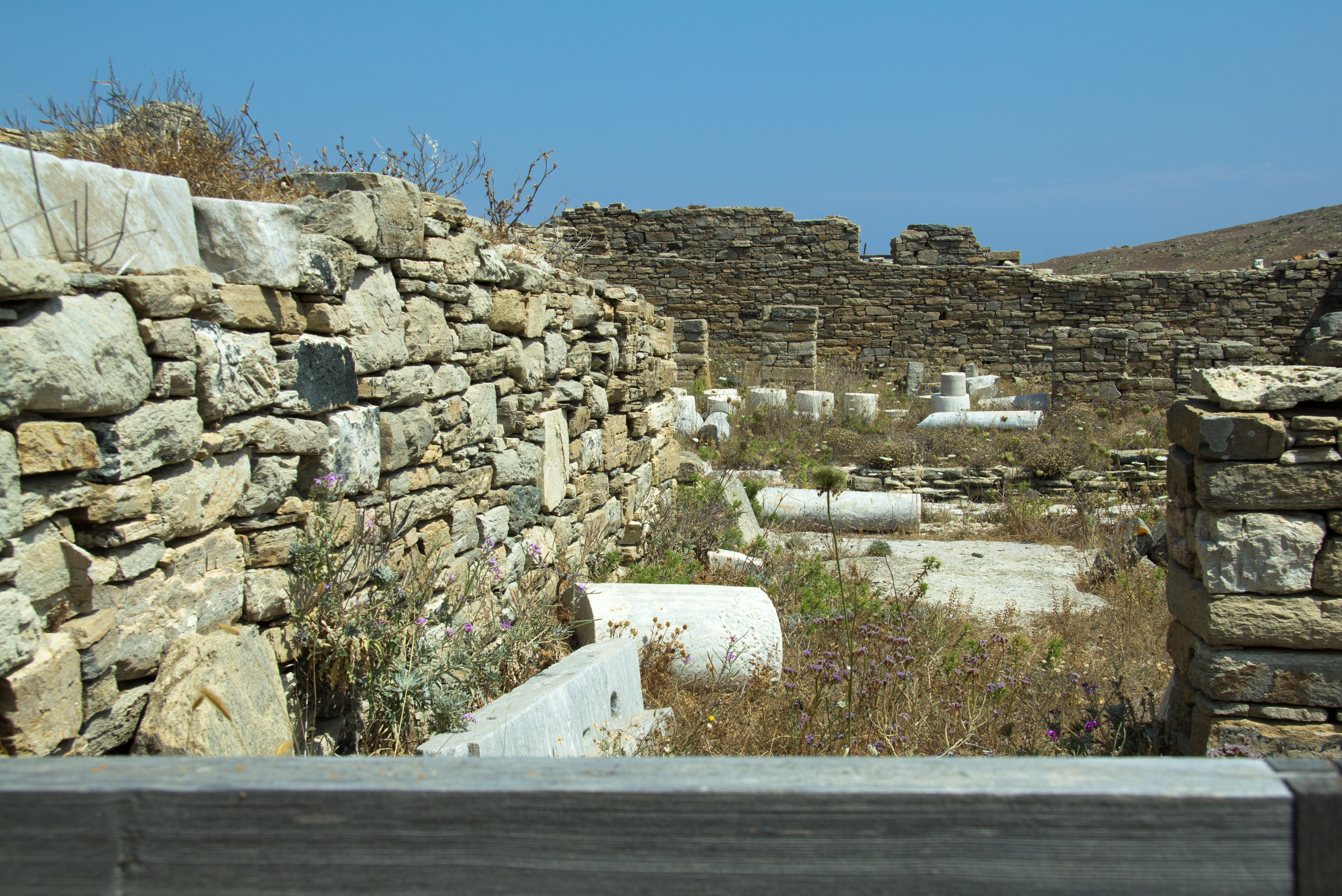
House of the Diadoumenos, Delos. The site of both the Pseudo-Athlete of Delos and the Diadoumenos.
