= Verism =

Artistic style of portraiture in ancient Rome

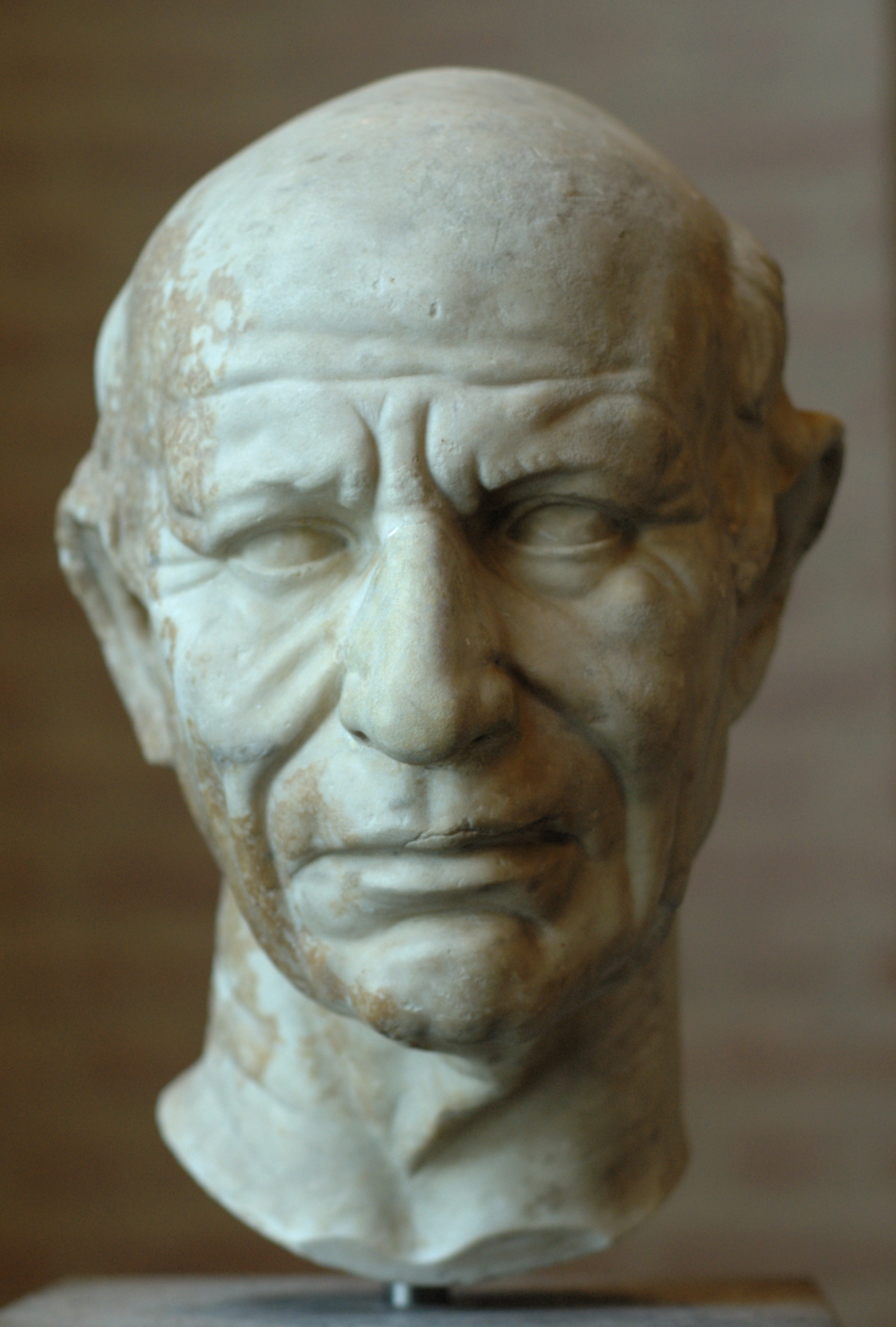
Portrait bust of a man, Ancient Rome, 60 BC

Verism was a highly realistic artistic style of Roman art. It was principally used in portraits of politicians, whose facial imperfections were rendered in detail or, according to some scholars, even exaggerated to highlight their maturity, experience, and gravitas. The word comes from Latin verus (true).

== Roman art ==
Verism emerged as an artistic style in the late Roman Republic (147–30 BC) and was often used for Republican portraits or on heads of “pseudo-athlete” sculptures. Verism placed great emphasis on the effects of age and imperfections--wrinkles, furrows, and even warts were depicted clearly and exaggerated to indicate of a well-used, active mind and virtues like dignity, gravity, and authority, which were markers of status. Age during the Late Republic was very highly valued and was synonymous with power, since one of the only ways to hold power in Roman society was to be part of the Senate.

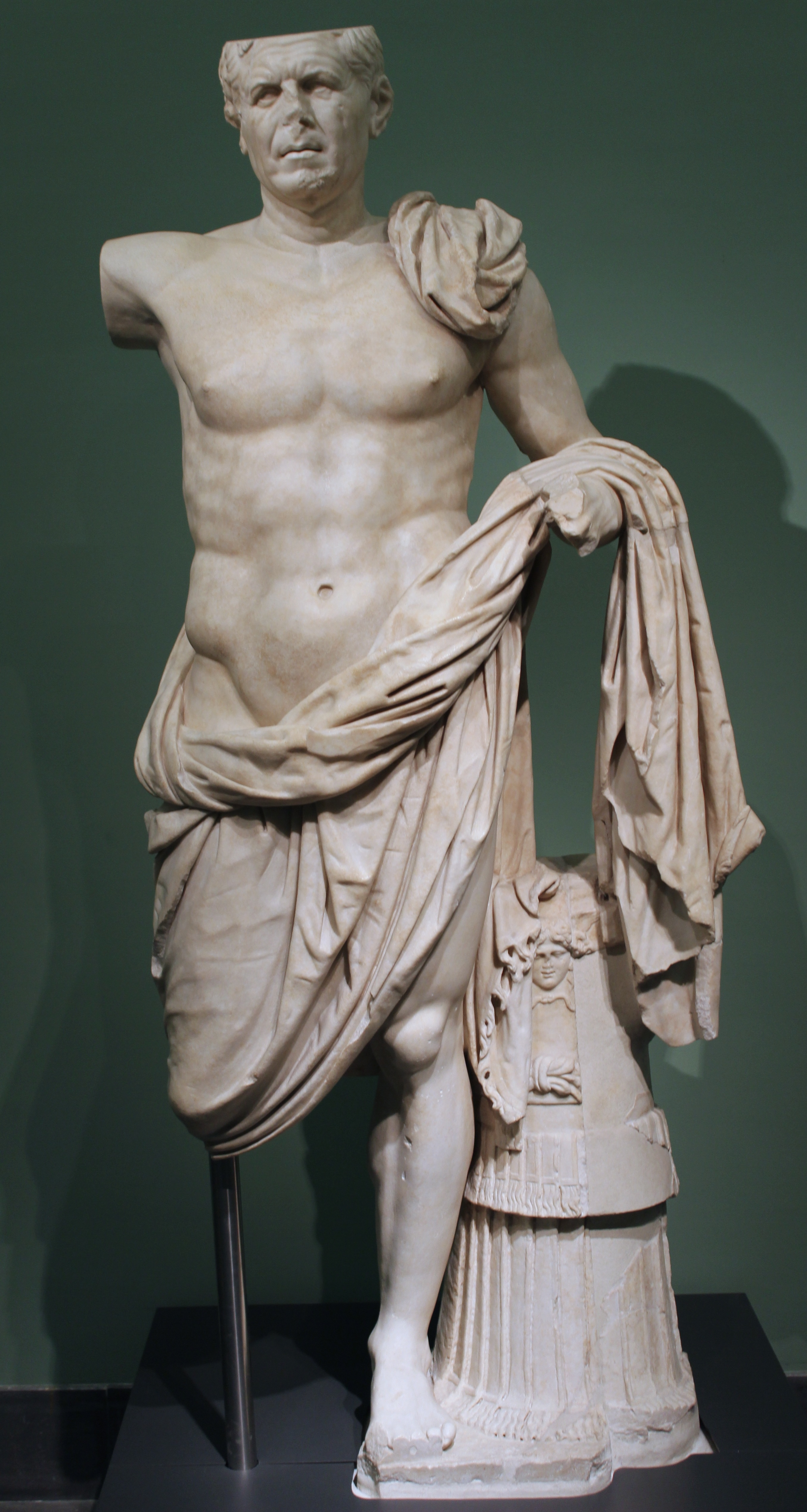
General de Tivoli, pseudo-athlete with veristic head, ca. 90-70 BC, Tivoli

It is debated among scholars and art historians whether these veristic portraits were truly blunt records of actual features or exaggerated features designed to make a statement about a person's personality. It is widely held in academia that in the ancient world physiognomy revealed the character of a person; thus, the personality characteristics seen in veristic busts could be taken to express certain virtues very much admired during the Republic. However, scholars can never know for certain the accuracy of portrait renditions made long before their own era.

== Verism throughout the Roman Empire ==
Verism first appeared during the Late Republic. The subjects of veristic portraiture were almost exclusively men, and these men were usually of advanced age, for generally it was elders who held power in the Republic. However, women are also seen in veristic portraiture, though to a lesser extent, and they too were almost always depicted as elderly. A key example of this is a marble head found at Palombara, Spain. Carved between 40 BC and 30 BC, during the decade of the civil war that followed Julius Caesar's assassination, the woman's face shows her advanced age. The artist carved the woman with sunken cheeks and pouches under her eyes to illustrate her age, much like male veristic portraiture of the time.

Verism, while the height of fashion during the Late Republican era, quickly fell into obscurity when Augustus and the rest of the Julio-Claudian dynasty (44 BC-68 AD) came to power. During this imperial reign, Greek Classical sculpture that featured "eternal youth" was favored over verism. It wasn't until after the suicide of Nero in 68 AD that verism was revived.

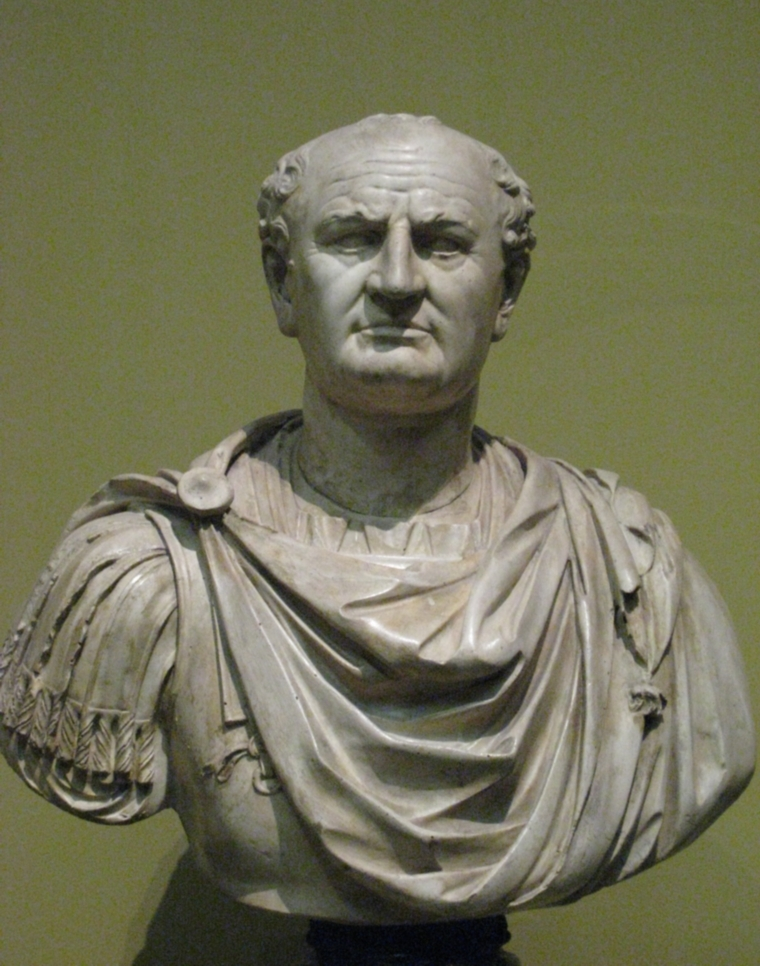
Bust of Vespasian, ca. 75-79

During the Year of the Four Emperors (68-69 AD) that resulted from Nero's suicide, when Galba, Vitellius, and Otho all grappled for the throne, verism made a resurgence, as seen in obverse portraits of Galba on bronze coins or marble busts of Vitellius. When Vespasian and his sons came to the throne the Flavian dynasty harnessed verism as a source of propaganda. Scholars believe that Vespasian used the shift from the Classical style to that of veristic portraiture to send a visual propagandistic message distinguishing him from the previous emperor. Vespasian's portraits showed him as an older, serious, and unpretentious man who was in every respect the anti-Nero: a career military officer concerned not for his own pleasure but for the welfare of the Roman people, the security of the Empire, and the solvency of the treasury. Like the Romans from the Late Republic, Vespasian used veristic busts to underscore traditional values as a way to indicate to the Roman people a connection to the Republic. With this reminder of the Late Republic, many Roman citizens were likely put at ease, knowing Vespasian was truly not like the previous emperor Nero, who represented everything the Republic abhorred. Yet after the Flavian period verism again faded into obscurity.

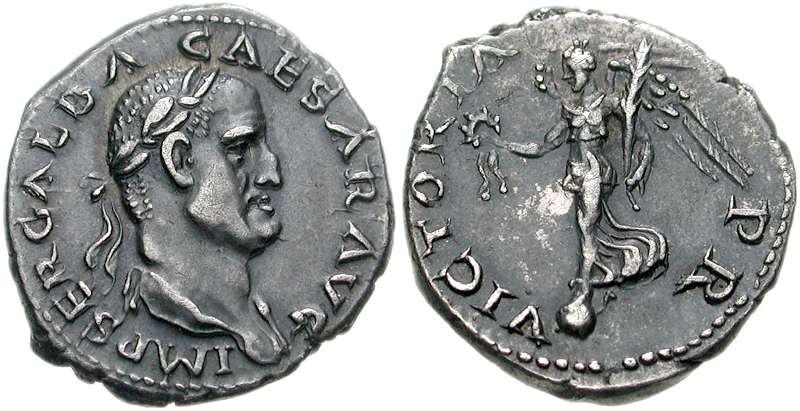
Obverse portrait of Galba, AD 68-69, Roman Mint

== Verism in academia ==
Veristic portraits of the late Republic hold a special fascination for classical art historians. Romans had inherited the use of sculpted marble heads from the Greeks but they did not inherit the veristic style from them. To scholars verism is uniquely Roman. Scholars have put forth multiple theories as to what or who were the precursors to Republican portraiture, but none of them has become the predominant view and the question of the origin of verism remains unresolved.

=== Italic heads theory ===
It has been argued the ancient Italic peoples had an inclination to veristic representation leading to influence on later Roman art. From a central Italian provenance in ancient times tribes from this area used Terracotta and Bronze to make a somewhat realistic portrayal of the human head. Yet the ‘Italic’ heads, as they are called, are not seriously considered to be a favorable or strong theory held among scholars as being forerunners to the Republican portraits. Scholars note that none of the realistic looking specimens can be shown to be earlier than the arrival of the new wave of Greek influence, rather than vice versa.

=== Etruscan cinerary urns theory ===
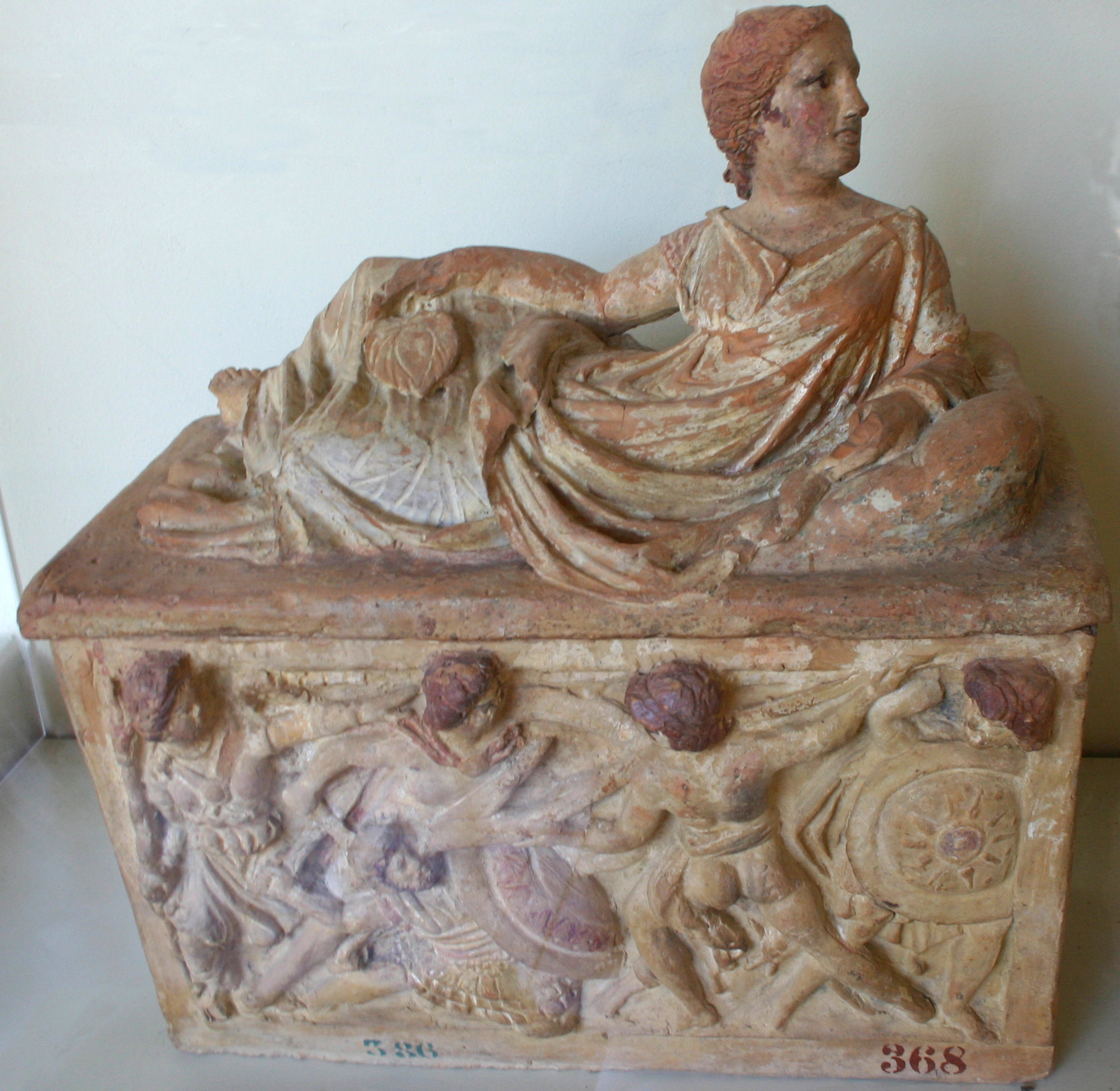
Etruscan cinerary urn, c. 150-100 BC

Scholars debate whether the heads of reclining figures on Etruscan cinerary urns are the forebears to Republican portraiture. It was traditional, and very common in Etruscan art, to provide a naturalistic look to figures. Many cinerary urns are realistic-looking, or at least have harshly-treated faces. Scholars debate whether the realistic-looking style of the figures' heads was a native creation which influenced the Romans, or whether the Romans influenced Etruria. Critics of this theory argue that issues relating to chronological time cast doubts as to the accuracy of the theory.

=== Etruscan death mask theory ===
Some scholars consider the ancient Roman custom of making wax portraits, a.k.a. funerary or death masks of their ancestors as a convincing source for the veristic style. H. Drerup argues that death masks molded straight from the face were used early in Rome, and exerted a ‘direct influence’ on Republican portraits. Yet research has cast doubt on this theory. None of the funerary masks date from before the 1st century AD. Evidence suggests that the ancestral funerary masks merely kept pace with contemporary portraits in the round. Chronology seems to be an issue with supporting the theory.

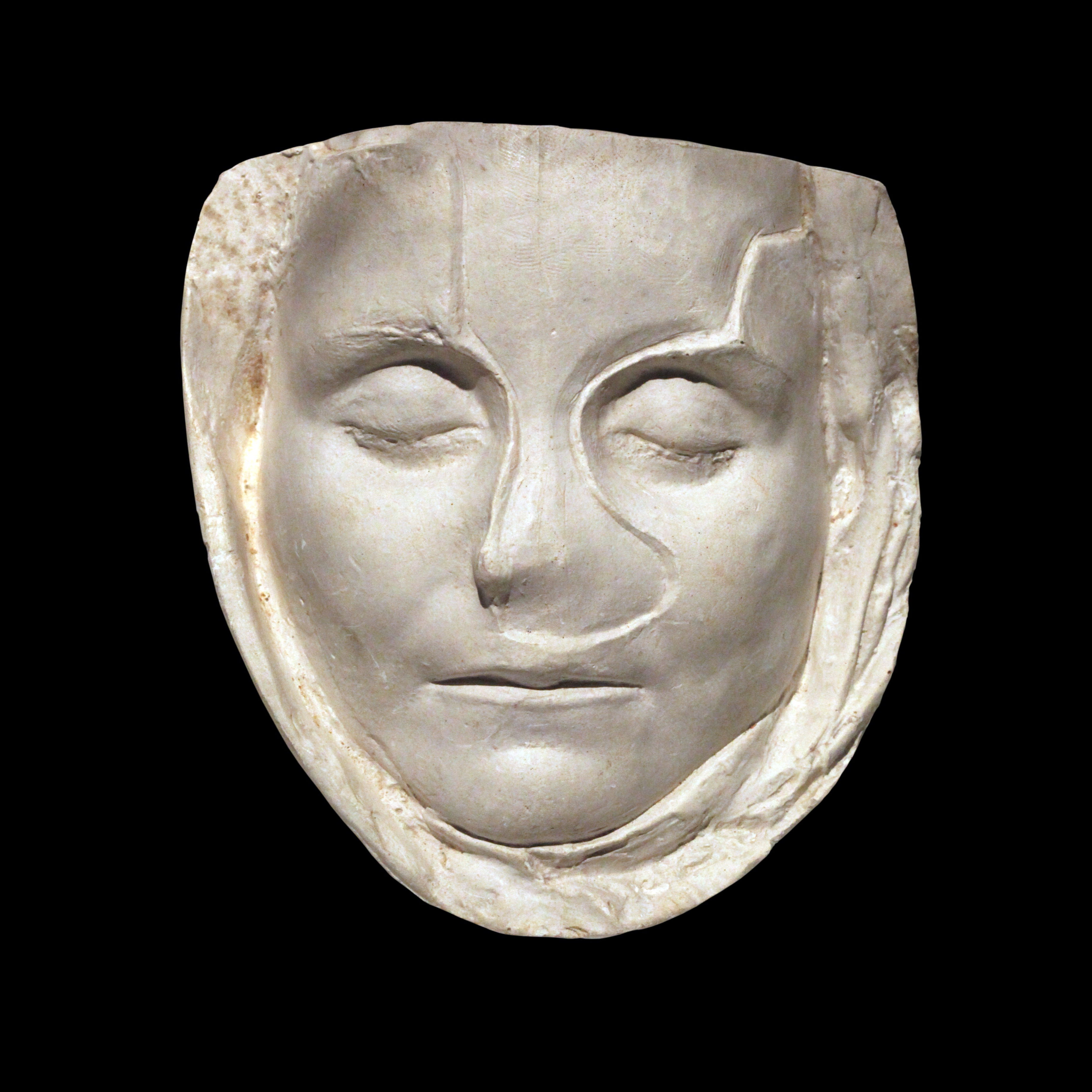
Roman funerary mask of a child

=== Egyptian influence theory ===
Scholars debate whether Egyptian influence started Roman verism. A group of portraits in hard Egyptian stone from the Roman Ptolemaic Kingdom show a harsh realism that is similarly seen in Republican portraits. Some scholars believe the Egyptian portraits began to be made before the Republican portraits and strongly influenced the Romans into establishing the veristic style when Egyptian priests and cults came into contact with Italy and Greece. Critics of this theory have argued that there is a lack of concrete dating of this certain Egyptian style. Suggested stylistic dates often fluctuate by two or three centuries, leaving no solid evidence for when the style of harshly realistic Egyptian portraiture began. They have also noted that Romans did not have extensive military or commercial contact with Egypt before 30 BC, which was after the Late Republic when verism was being used on portraiture.

=== Hellenistic culture theory ===
Another theory presented to scholars in classical academia suggests that verism came about from Greek reactions to the conquering Romans. The theory goes that Romans in the Republic privately cherished the Hellenistic culture yet still held onto Republic values. This interest leaked similar portrayals seen in the more realistic Hellenistic royal portraits of the Pontic and Bactrian kings of the first half of the 2nd century BC, such as the slight turn of their heads and upward glance of the eyes, into Roman veristic busts. As Rome conquered Greece the empire saw an influx of talented Greek artists who were commissioned by the Romans to create their portraits that portrayed both the Hellenistic look and Republic values. Greek artists notoriously portrayed foreigners in an unfavorable light as a result of Greek attitudes of superiority. For the Romans the Greeks found them not only to be foreigners, yet to be increasingly pompous and unlikeable oppressors. Greek artists were little concerned to put the sitter's case favorably and portrayed Romans with an unsympathetic likeness. As a result, the Greek artist would maintain the Hellenistic ‘pathos formula’ – turn of the head and neck, eyes looking upward – but the Greek sculptor, rather than adapt the Roman's features to a Hellenistic ruler ideal, had concentrated on bringing out an air of caricature to the face leading to what scholars call veristic portraiture.

Some scholars have objected to this theory as being the cause of verism by voicing doubt that Romans would not have been angered by the supposedly caricature-like portrayal given to them by the Greeks. Many question why the Romans did not punish the Greeks for this obvious slight. Yet scholars who are in favor of this theory state that the Romans simply didn't care for this over realistic portrayal. The Republic values of that time favored the straightforward and honest Roman citizen who did not need the deceits of art, but instead should be portrayed as they were, without artifice, for this would best bring out their Republican values. As a result, some art historians, like R. R. R. Smith, believe verism originated from the negative Greek attitudes, if not somewhat unconscious attitudes, which the artists felt towards these particular foreign clients. This was allowed to work itself into the Roman portraits because the artists had been freed from the usual obligation to flatter and idealize the sitter and were instead allowed to sculpt without artifice.
