= Portrait of Andrea Doria as Neptune =

Painting by Bronzino

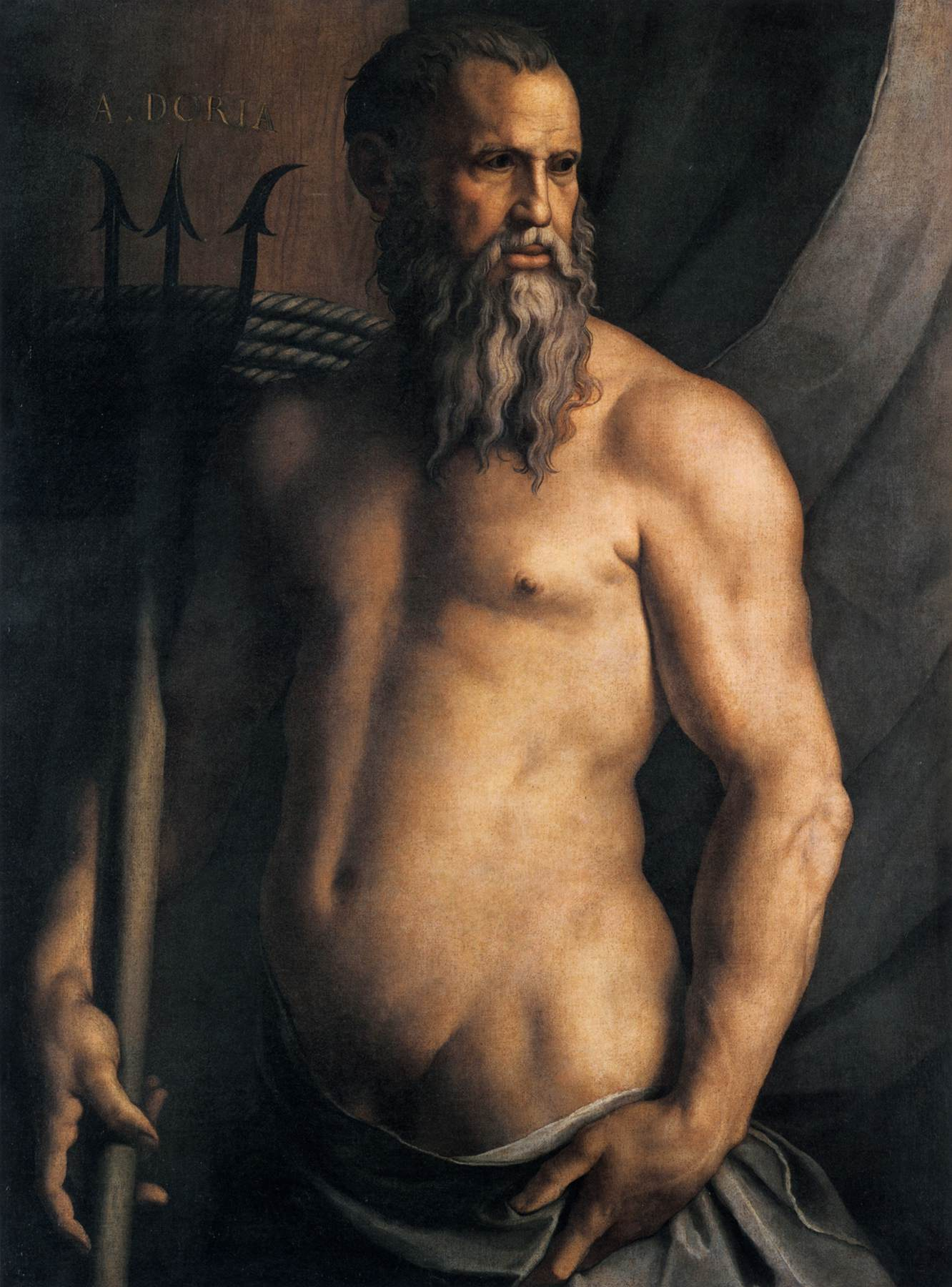
- Artist: Angelo Bronzino
- Year: c. 1530s or 1540s
- Medium: Oil on canvas
- Dimensions: 199.5 cm × 149 cm (78.5 in × 59 in)
- Location: Pinacoteca di Brera; Milan

The Portrait of Andrea Doria as Neptune (Italian: Ritratto di Andrea Doria in veste di Nettuno) is an oil painting on canvas completed by Bronzino for a private collection in either the 1530s or 1540s. It is now in the Pinacoteca di Brera in Milan, Italy. An oil painting on canvas, it measures 199.5 centimetres (78.5 in) by 149 centimetres (59 in). In a conscious revival of the convention in classical sculpture of showing important political figures in heroic nudity, it depicts the Genoan admiral, Andrea Doria, posing as the classical god of the sea, Neptune.

== Description ==
The subject of the painting is Andrea Doria, a Renaissance condottiero and admiral from Genoa, who was also the effective ruler of the city-state. He was around sixty when the portrait was painted (the date is somewhat disputed); either way his physique hardly reflects his age at the time.

He chose to be depicted nude as the "God of the Sea". Although Doria is depicted naked, he is not fragile or frail. He is depicted as a powerful virile man, showing masculine spirit, strength, vigor, and power. He is stern and resolute, looking calmly over all that he surveys, yet also refined and mannered.

The picture was meant to symbolize Doria's power, success, and fame as a celebrated admiral of his time. His beard is lengthy, flowing like the waves on the sea, and tufts of hair on his head recall the Roman emperors. Although his body is aged, his skin is still supple. He originally held a squared oar, a symbol of his command over his own fleet, but a trident head – described by art critic Camille Paglia as "cartoonish" – was painted over it by an unknown artist. The outline of the original oar is still faintly visible. The same individual probably added Doria's name.

Doria is holding a piece of sailcloth which barely covers his genitals and exposes some of his pubic hair. Paglia asserts that his taut, yet somewhat portly, stomach appears to direct its strength into Doria's covered penis. She finds the innuendo of an erection in the stiff wood of the trident and mast. Jonathan Jones of The Guardian describes the painting as "consciously equat[ing] naval and sexual prowess".

Doria stands on the deck of his ship, as Neptune would upon his chariot. Behind him is a black, "oppressive" sky, but he is highlighted as if by a full moon or the lightning of an approaching storm. He stands in a strained manner, his head facing to the right but his thighs and buttocks remaining in profile.

Through the allegory to Neptune, Doria – "a conqueror of the forces of Nature" through his work – is connected to the mythological powers. He becomes Neptune, ruler of the oceans.

== Doria ==
Andrea Doria was born into an aristocratic family who had been wealthy political leaders of the Genoan republic since 1134, together with another influential family, the Spinola. He was orphaned at an early age.

Aged about sixty when this portrait was completed, Doria was famous as a naval commander. For several years, he scoured the Mediterranean in command of the Genoese fleet, waging war on the Turks and the Barbary pirates. Although he was wealthy himself, Doria entered the service of King Francis I of France, who made him captain-general. On the expiration of his contract with Francis in 1528, Doria entered the service of Emperor Charles V. As imperial admiral, he commanded several expeditions against the Turks.

He was generally successful and perpetually active in military assignments from a very early age until he was over eighty, and he was especially successful at sea. Through his military successes he gained power, wealth, weapons, equipment and land, taking war booty from his enemies; this was the general method by which the Genoese nobles gained power and influence. In 1528, Doria's fleet won a victory over the French and drove them from Genoa; Doria became the new ruler. Even at the age of 84, he was leading military operations against the pirates in the waters of Genoa.

== Creation and provenance ==
Bronzino's so-called "allegorical portraits", such as this Genoese admiral, are not representative of his art, or of contemporary portrait painting in general, but are possibly more captivating due to the eccentricity of depicting a publicly recognized personality as a nude mythical figure. In painting Doria, he may have been inspired by Leonardo da Vinci's 1503 sketch of Poseidon and his horses.

The painting was commissioned for Paolo Giovio, bishop and retired papal physician, who lived near Como, and was perhaps completed around 1530. Giovo developed a "Museum of Famous Men" of commissioned portraits. Contemporary prints of the work provide documentary evidence for how it originally looked. There is a second version in the Villa Doria in Genoa, where Doria holds an oar rather than a trident; this seems to have been the original intention in the Milan painting.

== See also ==
- Statue of Neptune, Valletta
