= Panciatichi Assumption =

Painting by Andrea del Sarto

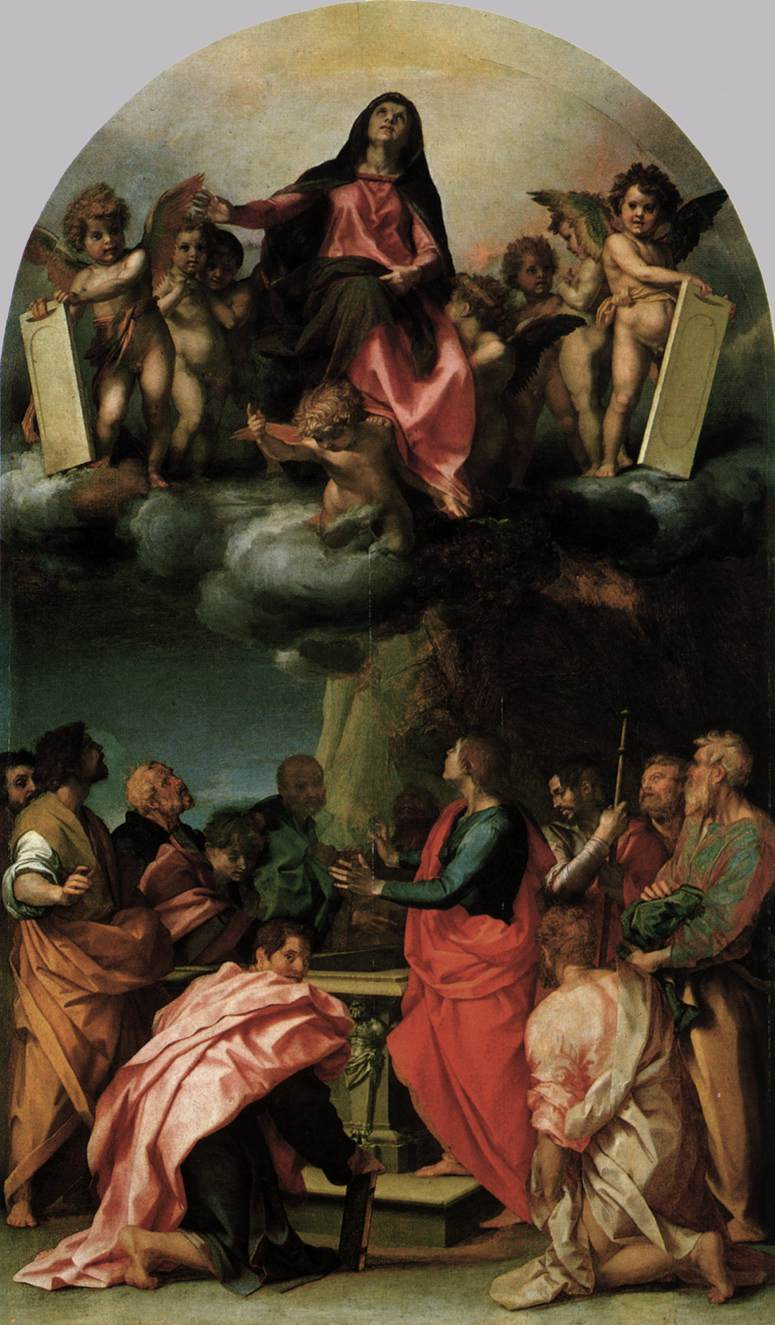
- Artist: Andrea del Sarto
- Year: c. 1522-1523
- Medium: oil on panel
- Dimensions: 362 cm × 209 cm (143 in × 82 in)
- Location: Pitti Palace, Florence

Panciatichi Assumption (Italian: Assunta Panciatichi) is a painting created c. 1522–1523 by the Italian Renaissance artist Andrea del Sarto. It is housed in the Galleria Palatina of Palazzo Pitti, Florence, Italy.

== History ==
The painting was commissioned by Bartolomeo Panciatichi (the Elder) for a private altar in the French church of Notre-Dame-de-Confort, in Lyon; however, when finished, it remained in Italy. It was subsequently acquired by Bartolomeo Panciatichi the Younger, the man later portrayed by Agnolo Bronzino. In 1526 Andrea del Sarto used the same composition in the Passerini Assumption, now housed in the same museum. Later, Bartolomeo gifted the work to Jacopo Salviati, who moved it to his villa del Poggio Imperiale. After all Salviati's possessions were confiscated by Duke Cosimo I de' Medici, the villa and all its content went to Paolo Giordano Orsini, husband of the duke's daughter Isabella d'Este.

After several changes of property, including a period under the Odescalchi, the villa returned to the Medici family in 1602. In 1687 it was decided to the move the Assumption to Pitti Palace, as part of the collection of prince Ferdinando de' Medici. The panel was enlarged in that occasion, in order to mount the same frame of the Passerini Assumption, also taken to the palace.

== Description ==
The work depicts the theme of the Assumption of Mary with two registers: the lower one shows the apostles of Jesus crowding around Mary's empty sepulcher, looking at her while she ascends to heaven in a cloud in the upper part, surrounded by happy putti. Andrea del Sarto painted two kneeling apostles in the middle, according to the traditional pyramidal composition of holy Conversations, joining them to a circle of other apostles which can be seen, for example, in Raphael's Oddi Altarpiece.

The presence of a grotto at the right is unusual. Mary is looking upwards, surrounded by a celestial light. At her sides are two symmetrical groups of angels, whose tables perhaps were intended to contain the artist's signature, the donor's name and the execution year; another, in the middle, calls the apostles' attention towards Mary.

Some of the characters were perhaps portraits of existing people. The apostle kneeling and looking towards the seer, for example, is sometimes identified as Andrea del Sarto's self-portrait.

== Sources ==
- Chiarini, Marco (1998). Galleria palatina e Appartamenti Reali. Livorno: Sillabe. ISBN 978-88-86392-48-8.
