= Panciatichi Holy Family =

Painting by Bronzino

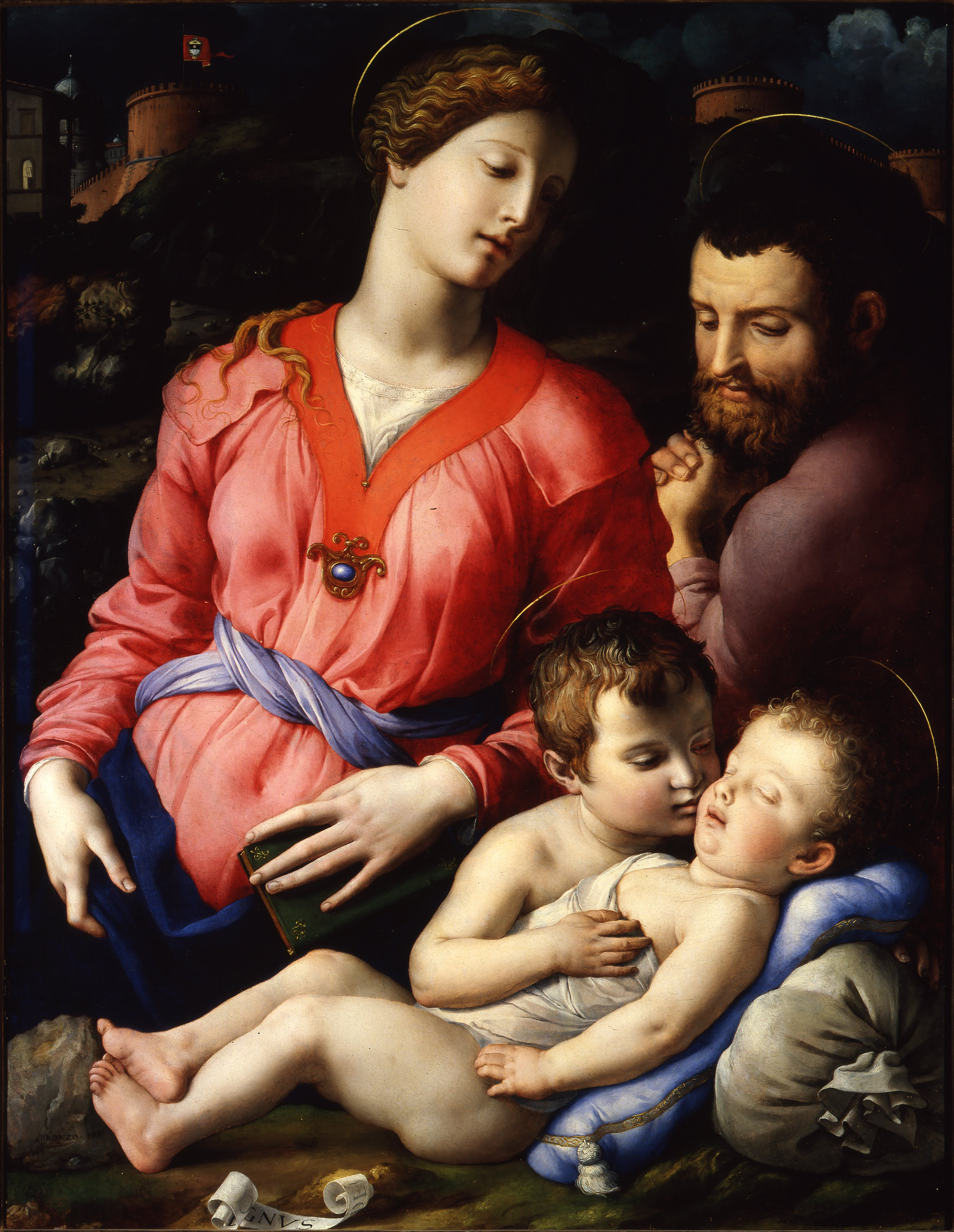
Panciatichi Holy Family (1541) by Bronzino

The Panciatichi Holy Family or Panciatichi Madonna and Child is a 1541 oil on panel painting by the Italian Mannerist painter Bronzino, signed on a stone in the bottom left corner. It is now in the Uffizi in Florence, where it was first recorded in the Tribuna in 1704. It remained there until 2010, when it was moved as part of the "New Uffizi" project. Preparatory drawings for the work are in the Uffizi's Gabinetto dei Disegni e delle Stampe (n. 6639F0) and (with variations) in the Phillips collection in London.

It may have been one of two "large paintings of Our Lady with other figures, beautiful and marvellous" which Vasari's Lives of the Artists mentions as being produced by Bronzino for Bartolomeo Panciatichi, chamberlain to Cosimo I de' Medici. A few years later Vincenzo Borghini mentioned "two paintings of the Glorified Virgin with other very beautiful figures" in the Panciatichi household. The Panciatichi link is supported by the flag with their coat of arms flying from a turret in the top left background.

The work's dating is more complex, but is thought to be close to the same artist's execution of portraits of Lucrezia and Bartolomeo, two members of the Panciatichi family, that is 1541, the year of the family's admission to the Accademia fiorentina.

== Description and style ==
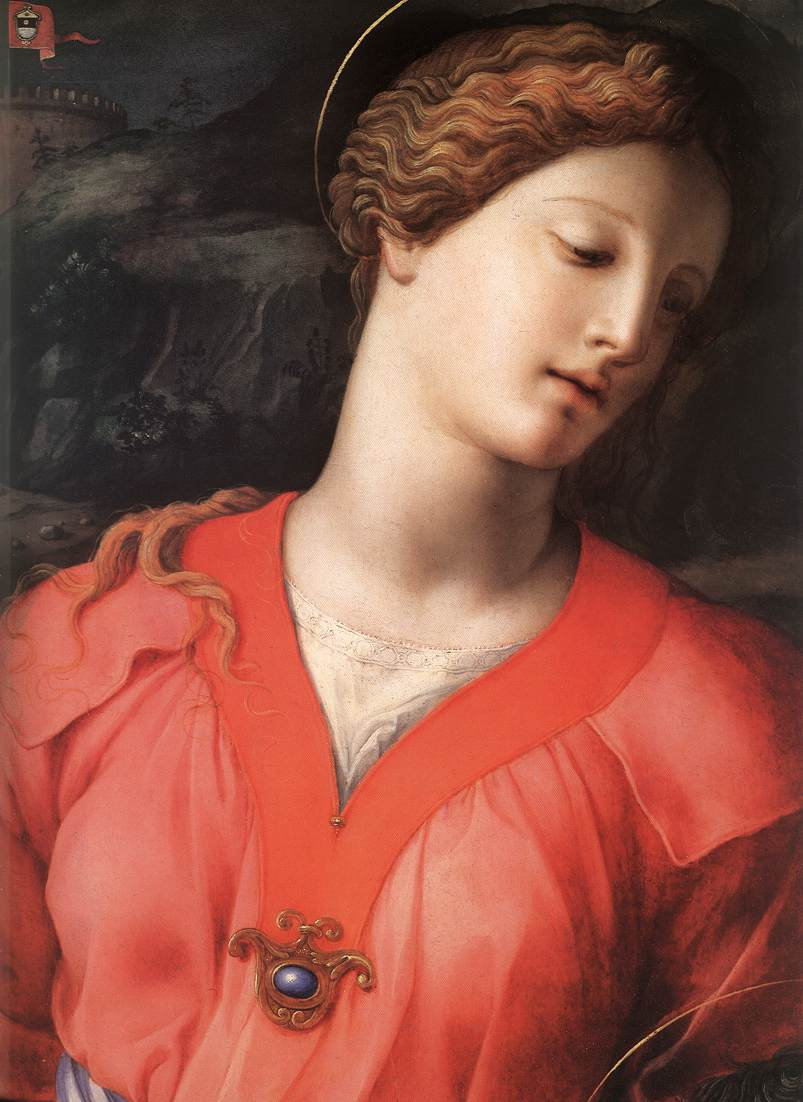
Detail

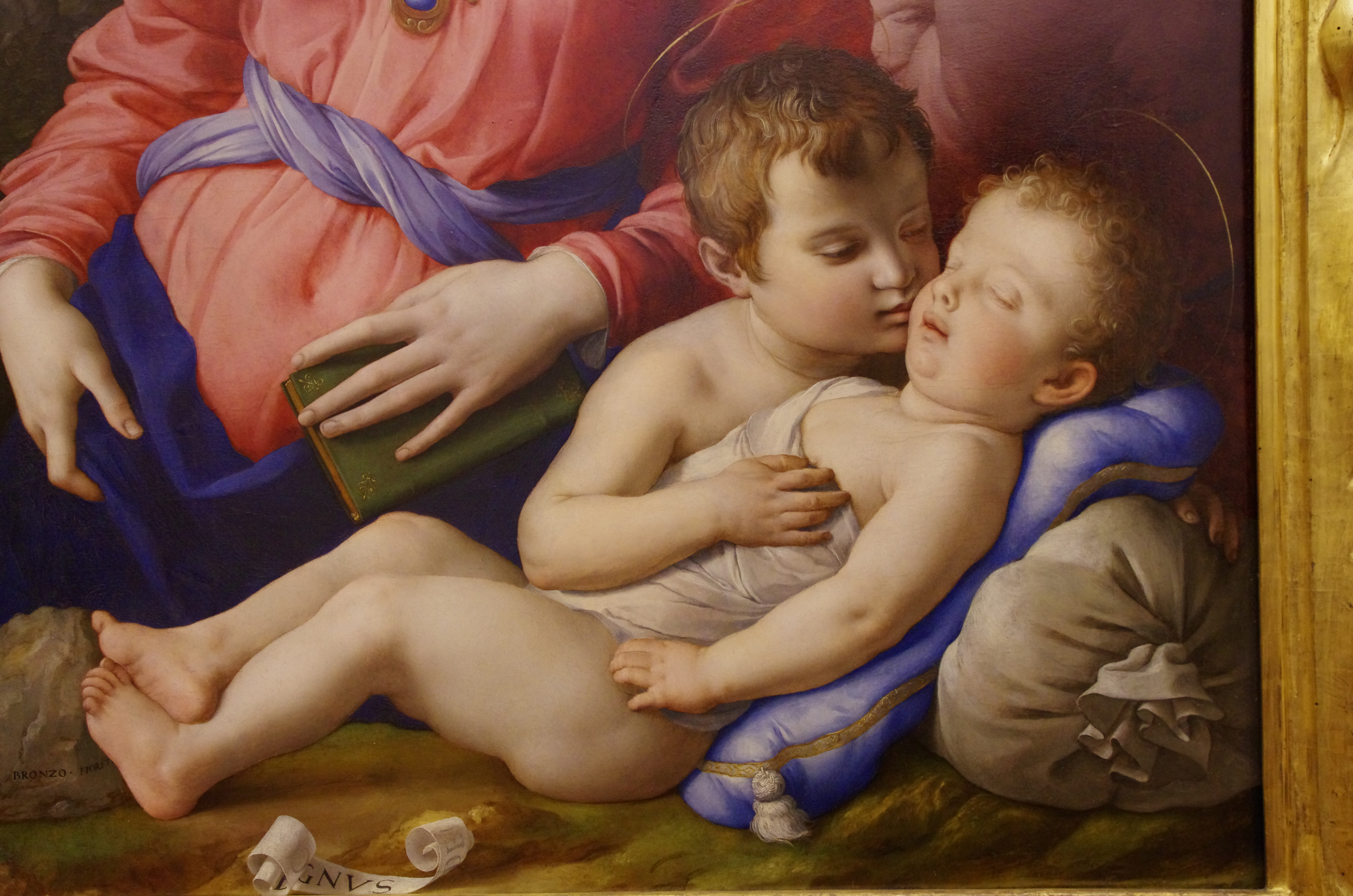
Detail

Before a dark background of rocks on which towers emerge under a leaden sky, the Holy Family with the infant Saint John is depicted in the foreground, with the sleeping Child placed parallel to the edge of the table, lying on a cushion and a sack. The chubby Christ, so pale and abandoned, seems to give an omen of his death and the kiss and embrace of little Saint John are useless to awaken him. From behind, the Madonna appears at half-length accompanied by a young Saint Joseph. A cold, strong light hits the figures in the foreground, while leaving the background in shadow. Mary's dress is a bright carmine red; her belt and the pillow a purplish blue.

Mary has collected and wavy hair that recalls that of Lucrezia Panciatichi, although a few free locks peek out over her shoulder. The features, although they vaguely pay homage to those of the client's wife, recall more strongly those of a classical Venus, with a particularly light and smooth complexion that resembles marble more than flesh. She wears an elegant brooch in the center of her chest.

Light gold threads form the halos. At the bottom the scroll, also readable from the reverse, shows the typical phrase of the Baptist, "Ecce Agnus Dei". In general the work is seen as one of the pinnacles of Bronzino's art, with a design of great elegance and highly refined effects.
