= Bartolomeo Panciatichi =

Italian humanist and politician (1507–1582)

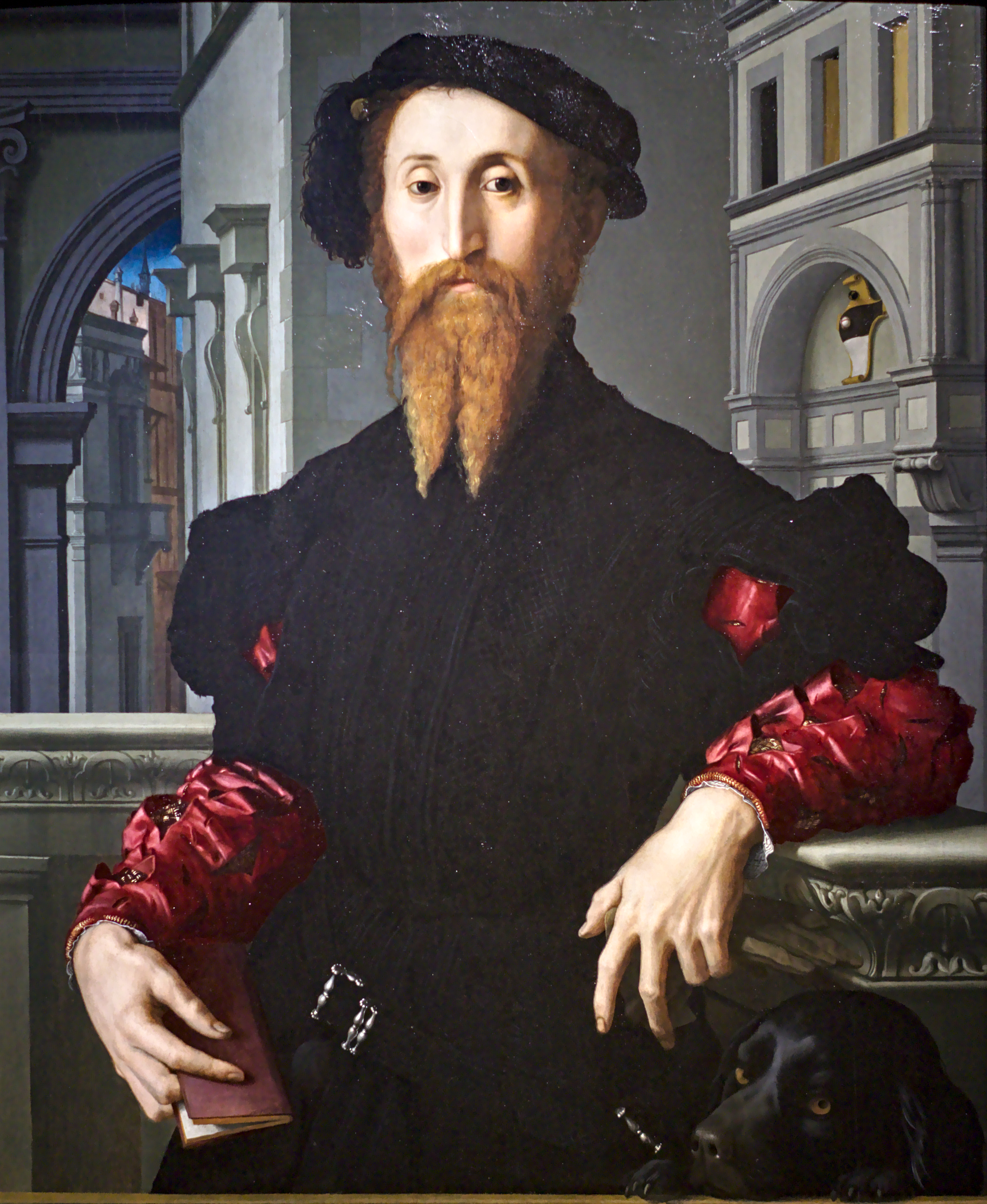
Portrait of Bartolomeo Panciatichi by Agnolo Bronzino.

Bartolomeo Panciatichi (1507–1582) was an Italian humanist and politician.

== Biography ==
He was born in France, the illegitimate son of the merchant Bartolomeo, who owned the main Florentine trade company working in France, at Lyon. His father had financed the conquests of Louis XII of France, and the young Bartolomeo was sent as page to the French court of King Francis I. Later he studied in Lyon and Padua, leaving the family's commercial activities to his relatives.

He was a friend of Jean de Vauzelles, abbot of Montrottier, who translated into French the religious works of Pietro Aretino; Panciatichi himself sent the first translated copies to the Italian author in Venice in 1539. In 1539 he moved to Florence, where, on 20 January 1541, he became a member of the Accademia degli Umidi. In 1545 duke Cosimo I de' Medici appointed him as consul to France. Here Panciatichi became attracted to the Protestant movement, and later brought to Florence several books which had been forbidden by the Catholic church.

He was one of the 35 people arrested as heretics in Florence in December 1551-January 1552; Panciatichi was later freed in exchange of a ransom. After promising he would no more deal with religious matters, he subsequently restarted his political career under the Medici aegis: in 1567 he became senator, in 1568 he was commissar in Pisa and, in 1578, in Pistoia.

== See also ==
- Portrait of Bartolomeo Panciatichi
- Panciatichi Assumption
- Panciatichi Holy Family

== Sources ==
- Caponetto, S. (1997). La Riforma protestante nell'Italia del Cinquecento. Turin. ISBN 88-7016-153-6.
