= Passerini Assumption =

Painting by Andrea del Sarto

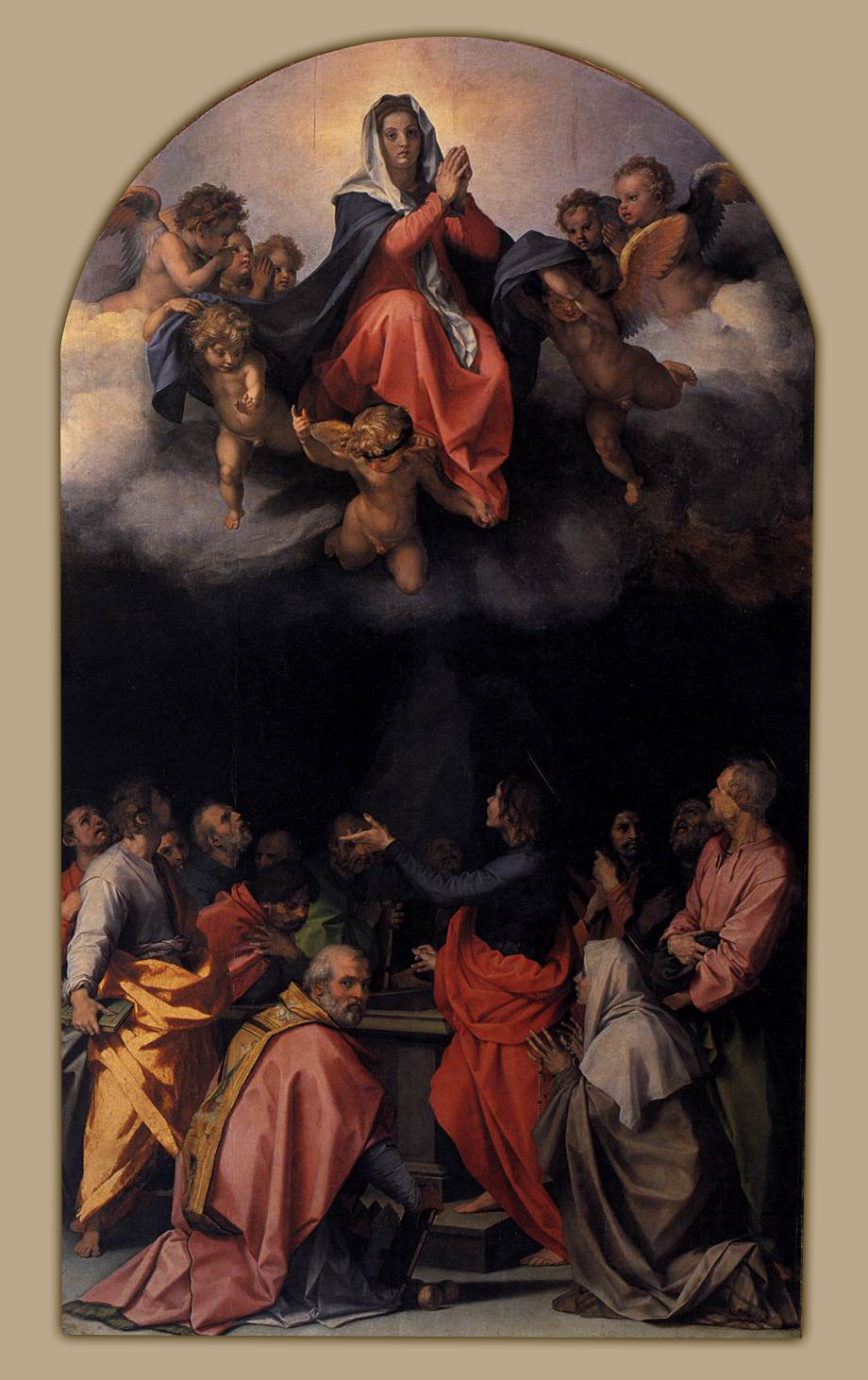
- Artist: Andrea del Sarto
- Year: 1526
- Medium: oil on panel
- Dimensions: 362 cm × 209 cm (143 in × 82 in)
- Location: Pitti Palace, Florence

Passerini Assumption (Italian: Assunta Passerini) is an oil-on-panel painting executed in 1526 by Italian Renaissance artist Andrea del Sarto. It is housed in the Galleria Palatina of Palazzo Pitti, Florence, Italy.

== History ==
The work was commissioned by Margherita Passerini for her private altar in church of Santa Maria fuori le mura at Cortona: the contract is dated 1526, for a price of 155 florins. In 1553 the friars of that church moved, together with their properties including this artwork, to the church of Sant'Antonio dei Servi.

In 1639 the panel was acquired by Grand Duke Ferdinand II de' Medici; a copy paid by him to remain in the church is now in the Diocesan Museum of Cortona. the work later was moved to the current location, in pair with the similar Panciatichi Assumption also by Andrea del Sarto.

== Description ==
Andrea del Sarto painted this work using his previous Panciatichi Assumption as model. The few variants include the dark background, instead of a landscape, the different position of Mary and the angels around her, and the replacement of the right kneeling apostle with Blessed Margaret of Cortona, who was the donor's protector. The left apostle was replaced by St. Nicholas, patron of the donor's father or dead son.

At the time of the execution of this version, Andrea del Sarto was already married, and (as mentioned by late biographer Giorgio Vasari) Mary's face is likely a portrait of his wife.

== Sources ==
- Chiarini, Marco (1998). Galleria palatina e Appartamenti Reali. Livorno: Sillabe. ISBN 978-88-86392-48-8.
