= Holy Family with Saint Anne and the Infant Saint John =

Two 16th-century paintings by Bronzino

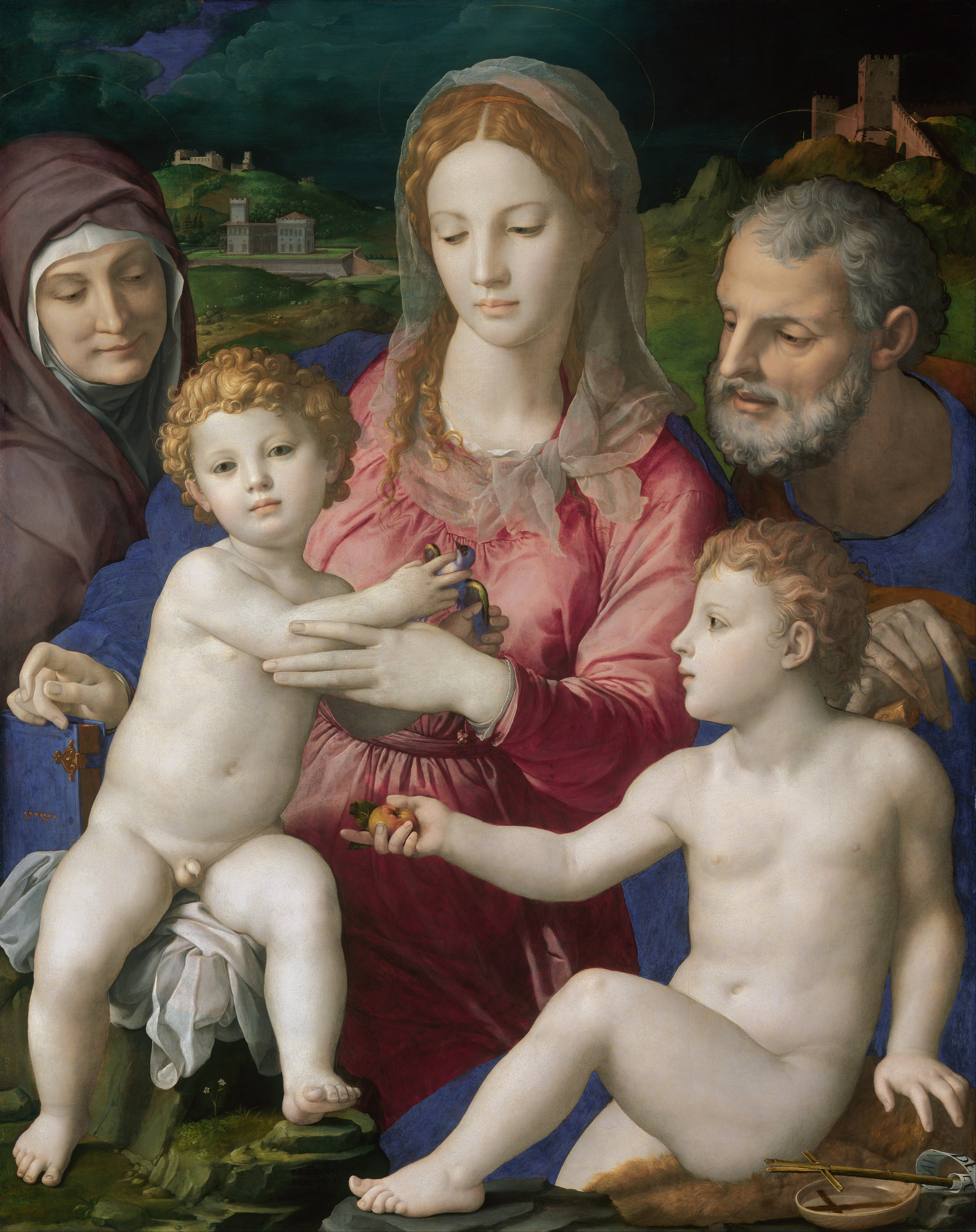
Vienna version (GG_183), 126.8 x 101.5 cm (49.9 x 40 in)

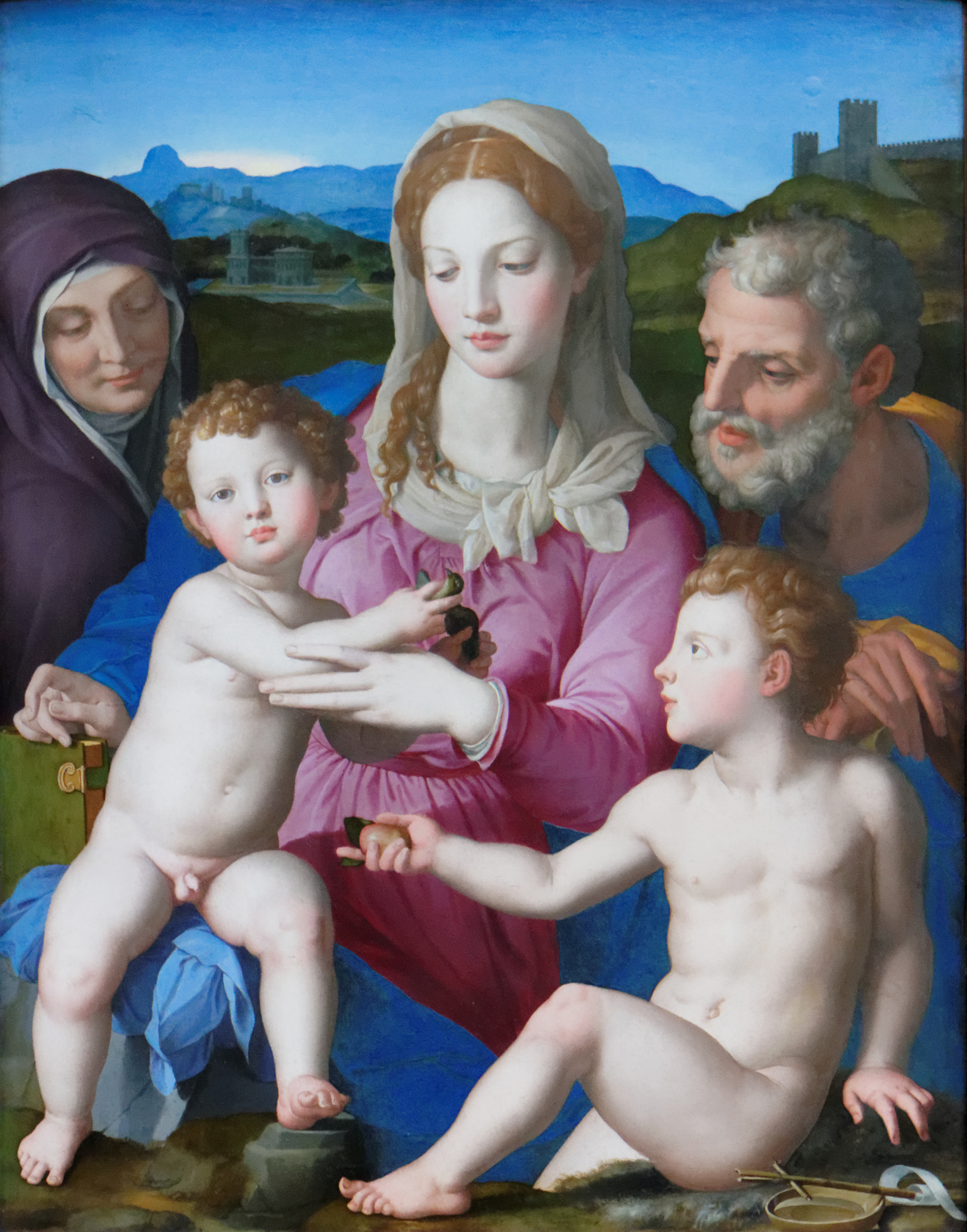
Louvre version (RF 1348), 133 x 101 cm (52 x 40 in)

The Holy Family with Saint Anne and the Infant Saint John and the Holy Family with Saint Elizabeth and the Infant Saint John the Baptist are titles given to two very similar pictures of the Holy Family by the Italian Renaissance painter Bronzino.

The first version (German: Hl. Familie mit Hl. Anna und Johannesknaben), dated to around 1545 or 1546, is in the collection of the Kunsthistorisches Museum in Vienna.

The second version (French: La Sainte Famille avec sainte Élisabeth et le petit saint Jean Baptiste), dated to the second quarter of the 16th century, hangs in the Louvre in Paris.

== Sources ==
- McCorquodale, Charles (1981). Bronzino. London: Jupiter Books Ltd. pp. 114–117.
- "Hl. Familie mit Hl. Anna und Johannesknaben". Kunsthistorisches Museum. Retrieved 19 October 2022.
- "La Sainte Famille avec sainte Élisabeth et le petit saint Jean Baptiste". Louvre. Retrieved 19 October 2022.
