= List of Assassin's Creed historical characters =

Assassin's Creed is a multimedia franchise published by Ubisoft, primarily known for its open-world action-adventure stealth video games. Beyond gaming, the series spans novels, comics, films, and an upcoming Netflix series. The narrative blends historical fiction with science fiction, centering on a millennia-old conflict between two secret societies: the Assassin Brotherhood (inspired by the Order of Assassins), who champion peace through free will, and the Templar Order (inspired by the Knights Templar), who seek peace through total control.

A central series convention involves a modern-day protagonist experiencing the lives of historical figures through the Animus, a simulation device developed by the Templar corporate front, Abstergo Industries. The series is currently divided into three main eras:

- The Desmond Miles Saga (AC I – AC III): The first five games follow Desmond Miles, a descendant of several master Assassins. By reliving his ancestors' memories, Desmond seeks "Pieces of Eden"—powerful artifacts left behind by the Isu, a precursor race that created humanity but perished in a prehistoric global catastrophe.
- The Helix Era (Black Flag – Syndicate): Following Assassin's Creed III, Abstergo developed "Helix" technology, allowing anyone to explore genetic memories via harvested DNA without being a direct descendant. During this era, the player assumes the role of unnamed research analysts representing themselves within the universe.
- The Layla Hassan Saga (Origins – Valhalla): More recent entries follow Layla Hassan, a former Abstergo employee who developed a portable Animus and eventually joined the Brotherhood.

This article details the major historical and fictional characters from the games and the 2016 film. While most entries feature standalone stories set in specific historical civilizations, some are closely linked—most notably the "Ezio Trilogy" (AC II, Brotherhood, and Revelations). To maintain clarity and avoid repetition, characters are listed by their first or most significant appearance, where their entire history is described.

== Characters of Assassin's Creed ==
=== Altaïr Ibn-La'Ahad ===
Altaïr Ibn-La'Ahad
- Assassin's Creed character
- First game: Assassin's Creed (2007)
- Created by: Ubisoft Montreal
- Voiced by: Philip Shahbaz Assassin's Creed; Cas Anvar Assassin's Creed Revelations

In-universe information
- Family: Umar Ibn-La'Ahad (father); Maud (mother)
- Spouse: Maria Thorpe (wife)
- Children: Darim Ibn-La'Ahad (son); Sef Ibn-La'Ahad (son)
- Relatives: Desmond Miles' mother (descendant); Desmond Miles (descendant); Elijah (descendant); Noa Kim (descendant)
- Origin: Masyaf
- Nationality: Syrian

Altaïr Ibn-La'Ahad (11 January 1165 – 12 August 1257) (voiced by Philip Shahbaz in Assassin's Creed, and by Cas Anvar in Assassin's Creed: Revelations) is the protagonist of Assassin's Creed, the spin-off games Assassin's Creed: Altaïr's Chronicles and Assassin's Creed: Bloodlines, and the novel Assassin's Creed: The Secret Crusade, as well as the secondary protagonist of Assassin's Creed: Revelations. He has also made appearances or been mentioned in several other games and spin-off media of the franchise, being a legendary figure in the history of the Assassin Brotherhood. Altaïr is a Syrian-born member of the Levantine Brotherhood of Assassins who serves as Mentor from 1191 until his death in 1257, assuming the position after killing the previous Mentor, Al Mualim, who betrayed the Assassins. During his tenure as Mentor and its brief interregnum, Altaïr makes several discoveries and inventions that greatly helps the Brotherhood's progression. Under his leadership the Levantine Assassins' spread their influence across the Old World, setting up many guilds in cities like Constantinople. With the Apple of Eden in hand, Altaïr changes the way members of the Brotherhood live their lives, writing the details in his fabled Codex for later generations of Assassins to read. Throughout his travels, Altaïr strengthens the Brotherhood, stops various Templar plots over the years, and stops Genghis Khan's march. In 1257, Altaïr dies sitting quietly in his chair in his secret library in Masyaf, and is found centuries later, in 1512, by Ezio Auditore da Firenze. Altaïr is an ancestor to Desmond Miles through the maternal line.

After completing Prince of Persia: The Sands of Time in 2003, director Patrice Désilets was instructed to begin work on the next Prince of Persia game. However, he wanted to move away from the lead character being a prince simply waiting for his reign to start, onto a character that wanted to strive to be a king. He came upon one of his university books on secret societies and its material related to the Order of Assassins. Désilets recognized that he could have the lead character in the game be the second-highest Assassin, seeking to be the leader of the group. The game began work under the title Prince of Persia: Assassin, or Prince of Persia: Assassins, inspired by Hassan-i Sabbah's life and making heavy use of Vladimir Bartol's novel Alamut. The Assassin character was fleshed out throughout the game's three-year development in an iterative fashion. The team had some idea of how the character dressed from Alamut and other historical works in all-white robes and a red belt but had to envision how to detail this in the game. One of the first concept sketches, drawn by animator Khai Nguyen, suggested the concept of a bird of prey, which resonated with the team. The Assassin was named Altaïr, meaning "bird of prey" in Arabic, and eagle imagery was used heavily in connection to the Assassins. Altaïr was to be a heroic character with a bit of a badass edge, and the artist borrowed elements of the G.I. Joe character Storm Shadow, a similarly skilled hero. Rendering long flowing robes was impossible on the newer hardware, so they shortened the robe and gave it a more feathered look, resonating the bird of prey imagery.

=== Al Mualim ===
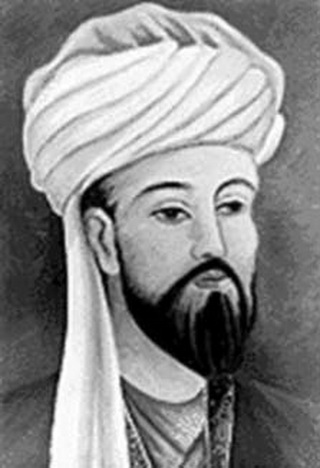
Engraving of Rashid ad-Din Sinan

Rashid ad-Din Sinan (1135 – September 1191) (voiced by Peter Renaday), commonly known as Al Mualim (Arabic: "The Teacher") or The Old Man of the Mountain, is based on his real-life counterpart, the Iraqi-born Hashshashin leader in the Syrian town of Masyaf. He is the hidden main antagonist of Assassin's Creed, and also appears in Assassin's Creed: Revelations and Assassin's Creed: The Secret Crusade. Al Mualim serves as Mentor of the Levantine Brotherhood of Assassins from circa 1176 until his death in 1191. A wizened old man, he trains Altaïr as an Assassin from a young age, and raises him in the Brotherhood's castle in Masyaf after his father, Umar, is killed by the Saracens, causing Altaïr to look up to Al Mualim as a second father. At some point in his life, Al Mualim secretly betrays the Brotherhood and helps the Templars find the fabled Apple of Eden, which he seeks for himself, hoping to use its power and knowledge to bring an end to the Crusades and establish worldwide 'peace' by controlling all of humanity. In 1191, he sends Altaïr to retrieve the Apple from the Templars, but his apprentice, blinded by arrogance, breaks all three tenets of the Assassin's Creed and alerts the Templars, though his fellow Assassin, Malik Al-Sayf, manages to grab the Apple before escaping. With the Apple in his possession, Al Mualim orders Altaïr, under the pretext of him going on a journey of redemption, to assassinate all nine Templars who were involved in the search for the artifact, to cover his own involvement. Altaïr succeeds, but in the process learns of Al Mualim's betrayal, and ultimately kills his former mentor in Masyaf. Following Al Mualim's death, Altaïr claims both the Apple and the position of Mentor; a move which initially unnerves many Assassins, but Altaïr would soon prove himself to be an efficient leader, more so than Al Mualim.

=== Maria Thorpe ===
Maria Thorpe (1160 – 12 September 1228) (voiced by Eleanor Noble) is an English noblewoman who becomes a Templar steward, and later the wife of Altaïr. As a child, Maria rejected the gender norms of her time, ultimately being disowned by her parents after annulling her arranged marriage. Seeking to fight in the Third Crusade, she disguises herself as a man and attempts to join the Templar Order. The Templar Grand Master, Robert De Sablé, sees through her ruse, but is impressed by her determination and hires her as his steward. During the events of Assassin's Creed in 1191, Robert deduces that he is Altaïr's final target, so he has Maria serve as a decoy to buy him time. Although she expected Altaïr to kill her, he spares her instead, and warns her not to follow him. After Robert is assassinated, Maria becomes obsessed with revenge. In Assassin's Creed: Bloodlines, she tracks Altaïr to Acre, but he bests her again and takes her prisoner. She escapes in an attempt to join the Templar's new leader, Armand Bouchart, but because of her failure to kill Altaïr, and her "miraculous" escape from him, he perceives her to be either incompetent or a traitor to the Order. He places a bounty on both her and Altaïr, forcing them to work together to kill Bouchart, after which Maria renounces the Templars and joins the Brotherhood. In the following years, she and Altaïr become very fond of each other and eventually marry and have two sons, Darim and Sef. In 1217, Maria joins Altaïr and Darim in a mission to Mongolia to halt the advance of Genghis Khan. While they are away, Abbas murders Sef and seizes leadership of the Assassin. Maria and Altaïr confront Abbas after they return to Masyaf in 1228, but Maria is killed in the ensuing struggle. Altaïr, deeply affected by the loss of his wife, would be haunted by her death for years to come.

=== Malik Al-Sayf ===
Malik Al-Sayf (1165 – 12 September 1228) (voiced by Haaz Sleiman) is a member of the Levantine Assassin Brotherhood in Syria during the High Middle Ages. Trained from an early age in the ways of the Brotherhood, he attains a high rank by 1191. Raised to be an Assassin, Malik learns the fighting arts that strikes fear into the hearts of their enemies. He is an excellent swordsman, a devoted acolyte to the Creed, and a caring adult figure to his brother, Kadar. He is also initially a rival of Altaïr, whom he often berates for disobeying the tenets of the Assassin's Creed. In 1191, Altaïr, Malik, and Kadar go to Solomon's Temple to retrieve the Apple of Eden on the orders of Al Mualim. His jealousy turns into hatred when Altaïr ignores the tenets of the Creed, endangers his companions' lives during the events of Solomon's Temple, and subsequently botches a mission, which results in Kadar's death, and the injury and subsequent amputation of Malik's arm. Malik retrieves the Templar treasure that Altaïr failed to find and delivers it to Al Mualim. No longer able to operate as an Assassin, Malik is made the bureau leader of the Jerusalem Assassins. At first he is bitter towards Altaïr, but over time forgives him and acknowledges his own fault in his brother's death. When Altaïr returns to confront Al Mualim, Malik supports him, distracting the indoctrinated Assassins while Altaïr faces Al Mualim. After Al Mualim's death, Altaïr becomes the new Mentor of the Levantine Assassins and names Malik his second-in-command. Malik is appointed as a temporary leader in Altaïr's absence, though he would soon be imprisoned by Abbas Sofian in Masyaf's dungeons for almost two years with false charges of murder. When Altaïr returns from his quest across the Middle East in 1228, Abbas has Malik executed and sends his severed head to Altaïr as a threat.

=== Kadar Al-Sayf ===
Kadar Al-Sayf (died July 1191) is the younger brother of Malik Al-Sayf and a member of the Levantine Assassin Brotherhood. He is less experienced than his brother and, just like him, is a devoted follower of the Creed, although unlike him admires and deeply respects Altaïr. In 1191, Kadar accompanies Altaïr and Malik to Solomon's Temple to retrieve the Apple of Eden from the Templars. However, Altaïr inadvertently sabotages the mission due to his arrogance, and Kadar, due to his lack of swordsmanship skills, is swiftly killed by the Templars while Altaïr and Malik manage to escape with the Apple.

=== Richard the Lionheart ===
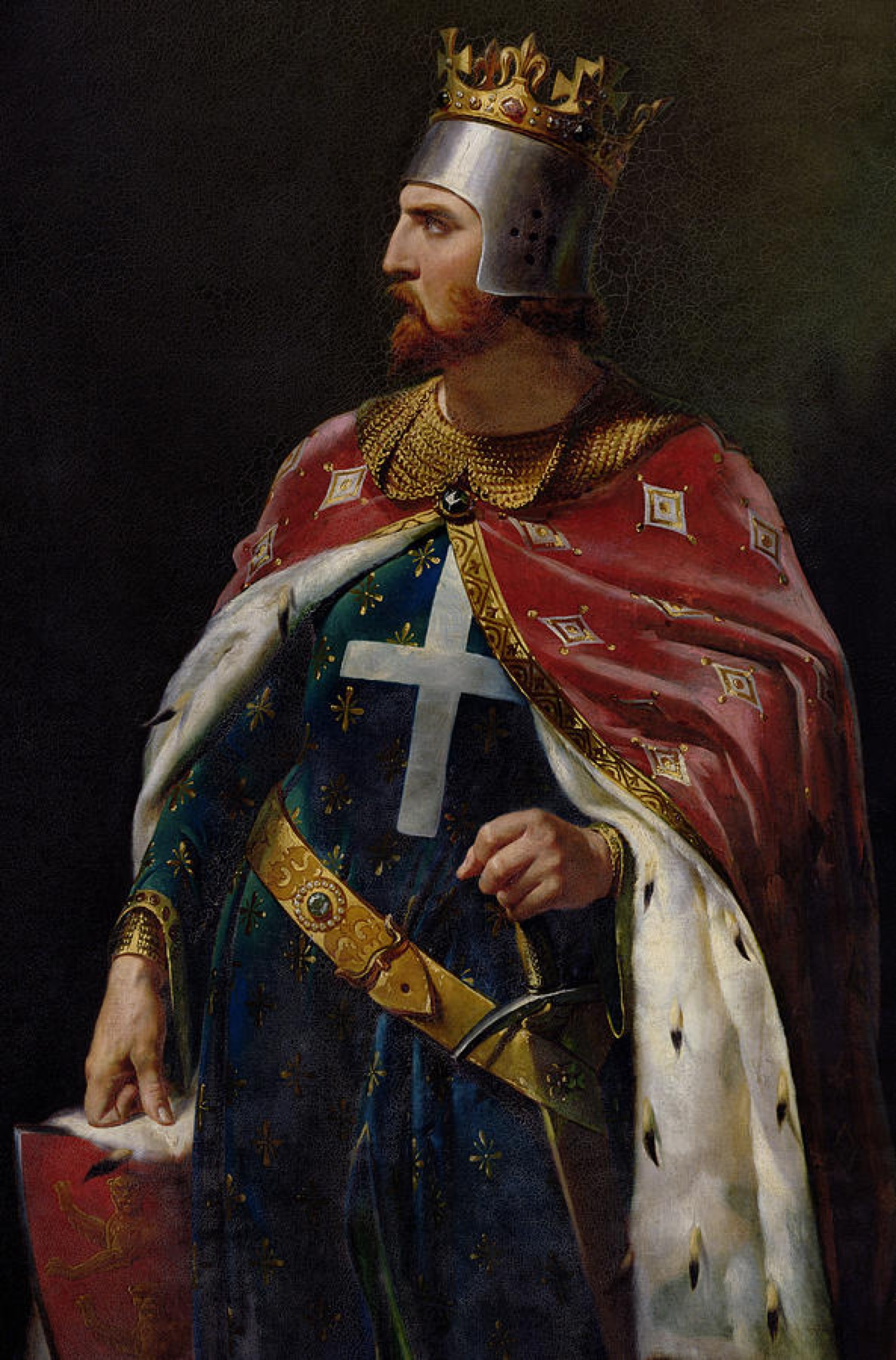
19th-century portrait of Richard the Lionheart by Merry-Joseph Blondel

Richard the Lionheart (voiced by Marcel Jeannin) is encountered by Altaïr during the Battle of Arsuf, where the Assassin informs Richard that his lieutenant, Robert de Sablé, intends to betray him. In response, Robert claims that Altaïr's story is a ruse to keep Richard from interfering in the Assassin's mission. Unsure on whom to believe, Richard leaves the decision in the hands of God, declaring that Robert and his Templars are to fight Altaïr in a trial by combat. Altaïr wins, and Richard accepts the Assassin's version of events.

=== Robert de Sablé ===
Robert de Sablé (c. 1150 – 7 September 1191) (voiced by Jean-Philippe Dandenaud) is the secondary antagonist of Assassin's Creed. He is a French lieutenant under Richard the Lionheart, and Grand Master of the Knights Templar during the Third Crusade. Robert follows a goal similar to the Assassins (to end the war in the Holy Land). Al Mualim has no objections against him ending the Crusade, but opposes the Templar's methods—the Assassins would have people find peace themselves, but the Templars would force their "peace" onto others and attempt to control them. Robert is ultimately assassinated by Altaïr during the Battle of Arsuf in September 1191; which contradicts his historical death in 1193.

=== Tamir ===
Tamir (c. 1147 – 1191) (voiced by Ammar Daraiseh) is a black arms merchant from Damascus and a member of the Templar Order, who uses his wealth to fund his fellow Templars' operations with the goal of establishing a new world order. He is the first of the nine Levantine Templars to be assassinated by Altaïr.

=== Garnier de Naplouse ===
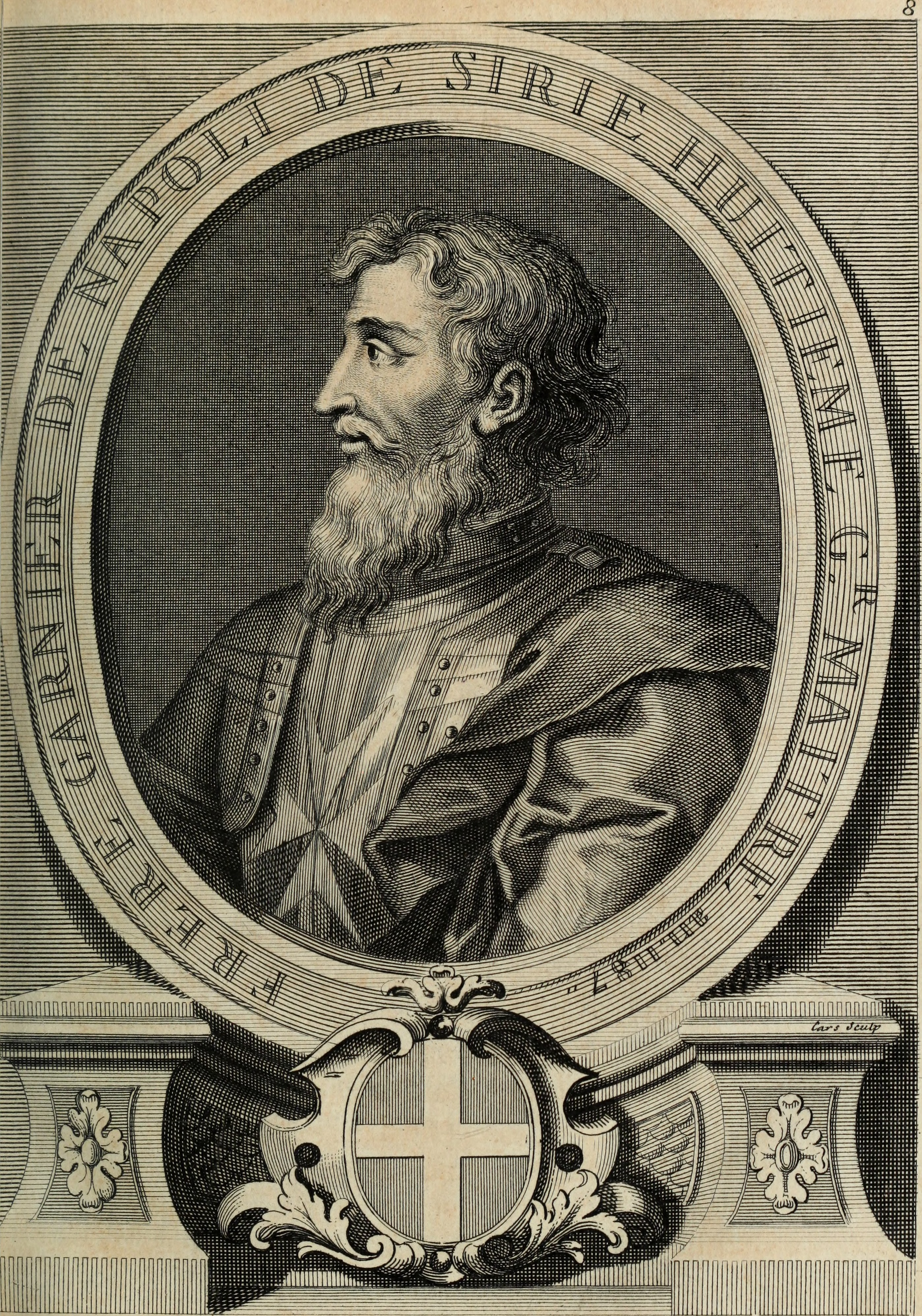
Portrait of Garnier de Nablus

Garnier de Naplouse (c. 1147 – 1191) (voiced by Hubert Fielden) is a French nobleman and the tenth Grand Master of the Knights Hospitalier in Acre, as well as a member of the Templar Order. He experiments on and tortures innocent people and lunatics he picks up off the streets of Acre, claiming they are his children and that he is helping them. He transformed Acre Fortress into a hospital and is killed by Altaïr inside it.

=== Talal ===
Talal (c. 1157 – 1191) (voiced by Jake Eberle) is the leader of a gang of slavers in Jerusalem and a member of the Templar Order. He is Altaïr's third target, and before dying by his blade, he tells the Assassin that he did not sell people for profit, but to "rescue" them by giving them better living conditions.

=== Abu'l Nuqoud ===
Abu'l Nuqoud (c. 1137 – 1191) (voiced by Fred Tatasciore) is Damascus' Saracen merchant king and a member of the Templar Order. He invites many Damascan citizens to a grand party at his palace, where all the attendants are killed with poisoned wine or by the guards so that Abu'l Nuqoud may steal their money intended to fund the Saracen army, as well as exact revenge on those who tormented him because of his appearance. He is Altaïr's fourth target, who kills him after infiltrating his party.

=== William of Montferrat ===
William V, Marquess of Montferrat (1136–1191) (voiced by Harry Standjofski), also known as Guglielmo V del Monferrato in Italy, is an Italian Crusader and Richard the Lionheart's regent in Acre, as well as a member of the Templar Order. He plans to kill Richard and give Acre to his son Conrad of Montferrat, and makes his plans inside Acre's Citadel, where he is ultimately assassinated by Altaïr.

=== Majd Addin ===
Majd Addin (died 1191) (voiced by Richard Cansino), loosely based on Baha ad-Din ibn Shaddad, is the Saracen regent of Jerusalem and a member of the Templar Order, who rules the city through fear by making examples out of criminals, whom he executes publicly. He is assassinated by Altaïr during one of his executions.

=== Jubair al Hakim ===
Jubair al Hakim (died 1191) (voiced by Fred Tatasciore), loosely based on Ibn Jubayr, is a chief scholar of the Saracens in Damascus and the leader of "The Illuminated", as well as a member of the Templar Order. He plans to have all texts in Damascus burned, claiming that these texts lead people astray. He is killed by Altaïr during one of his public purges.

=== Sibrand ===
Sibrand (c. 1157 – 1191) (voiced by Arthur Holden) is a German Crusader and the first Grand Master of the Teutonic Order in Acre, as well as a member of the Templar Order. He intends to have all ships submitted to him be used in a blockade against King Richard, but is killed on his personal ship by Altaïr.

== Characters of Assassin's Creed II and Lineage ==
=== Ezio Auditore da Firenze ===
Ezio Auditore da Firenze (24 June 1459 – 30 November 1524) (voiced by Roger Craig Smith; played by Devon Bostick in Assassin's Creed: Lineage) is the protagonist of Assassin's Creed II, Assassin's Creed: Brotherhood, and Assassin's Creed: Revelations, as well as the spin-off game Assassin's Creed II: Discovery and the animated short film Assassin's Creed: Embers. He is an Italian nobleman born in Florence during the Renaissance and unknown to most historians and philosophers. He becomes an Assassin in 1476 to avenge the death of his father and brothers in a conspiracy masterminded by the Templars, but slowly learns to overcome his desire for revenge and fight for peace and freedom instead. He is essential in elimating the Templar Order's presence in Italy in the early 16th century, and also foils major Templar schemes in both Spain and the Ottoman Empire during his travels. In 1503, Ezio becomes Mentor of the Italian Brotherhood, a title he holds until 1513. Following his retirement from the Brotherhood, he lives a peaceful life with his family in the Tuscan countryside, ultimately passing away from a heart attack in 1524. Ezio is an ancestor to Desmond Miles through the paternal line.

=== Federico Auditore ===
Federico Auditore (1456 – 29 December 1476) (voiced by Elias Toufexis; played by Jesse Rath in Assassin's Creed: Lineage) is the eldest child of the Auditore family and Ezio's older brother. In 1475 he enters the Medici bank as a clerk, but in 1476 is removed from the bank's payroll (on suspicion of being responsible for the disappearance of a bag of florins on 17 September 1475). At the start of Assassin's Creed II, he helps Ezio fight Vieri de Pazzi, visits a doctor to treat his brother's wound, and races him to the top of Santa Trinita. He is later captured and hanged alongside his father Giovanni and younger brother Petruccio in the Piazza della Signoria on the orders of Uberto Alberti and Rodrigo Borgia.

=== Giovanni Auditore ===
Giovanni Auditore (3 May 1436 – 29 December 1476) (voiced and played by Romano Orzari), loosely based on Giovanni Villani, is the head of the Auditore family, Ezio's father, and a banker, advisor, and nobleman who is a pivotal figure in Florentine banking. Giovanni oversees the Medici bank branches across Italy, and when Lorenzo was busy, he ran the bank. He extends his reach into the bank's international operations, and notices the problems with the Lyon bank, which Francesco Sassetti saves. In 1471 he secures the negotiations between the Pope and the Medici bank. Giovanni is also secretly a member of the Italian Brotherhood of Assassins, and, in 1476, uncovers a plot by Rodrigo Borgia and the Pazzi family to overthrow the Medici. Before he can expose it, however, he and two of his sons, Federico and Petruccio, are arrested and subsequently hanged on the orders of Borgia and Giovanni's former ally, Uberto Alberti. Before his death, Giovanni directs Ezio to find his Assassin equipment, thus setting his son on the path of becoming an Assassin.

=== Claudia Auditore ===
Claudia Auditore (2 January 1461 – unknown) (voiced by Angela Galuppo) is the only daughter of the Auditore family and Ezio's younger sister. Following her father and brothers' execution in 1476, she flees Florence with her mother and Ezio. In 1477, Claudia becomes the financial accountant of the town of Monteriggioni, which is under the leadership of her uncle, Mario Auditore. The town flourishes with Claudia's organization and the money made from Monteriggioni's shops and organizations. In January 1500, Monteriggioni is besieged and largely destroyed by the Papal army commanded by Cesare Borgia, which leave the Auditores homeless. Going against Ezio's desire for them to return to Florence, Claudia and Maria follow Ezio to Rome, where the former eventually becomes the madame of the Rosa in Fiore, the city's most popular brothel. After proving herself to be a worthy fighter to her brother, Ezio inducts Claudia into the Assassin Brotherhood in 1502. The following year, Claudia is captured by Borgia die-hards, and is subsequently saved by Ezio and Niccolò Machiavelli. During this time, she steps down as the madame, and stays in Florence with her friend Paola to recover until 1507. Claudia is given temporary control of the Italian Assassins in 1510 when her brother leaves on a journey to the Middle East to find Altaïr Ibn-LaʼAhad's library. She holds the position until her brother returns in late 1512, after which Ezio resigns from the Brotherhood and assigns a successor.

=== Maria Auditore ===
Maria Auditore (1432–1504) (voiced by Ellen David; played by Claudia Ferri in Assassin's Creed: Lineage) is a writer and noble. She was born into the Mozzi, a powerful banking family. She is one of the most famous historical sources of the time period due to her multi-volume diary, which has been translated by several notable scholars and is on display in the Uffizi Gallery in Florence. With funding from her parents, she opened up a bakery in the courtyard of her family palazzo, which she transformed into an artistic gathering place. In 1448, she meets Giovanni Auditore, and marries him in 1450. Following the death of her husband and two of her sons, Federico and Petruccio, in 1476, she flees Florence with her surviving son Ezio and daughter Claudia, and moves into the estate of her brother-in-law, Mario Auditore, in Monteriggioni. Years later, following the attack on Monteriggioni in early 1500, she moves to Rome with her family, where she helps Claudia manage the Rosa in Fiore brothel until her death in 1504.

=== Petruccio Auditore ===
Petruccio Auditore (1463 – 29 December 1476) is a student and noble, and the youngest child of the Auditore family. In 1475, he is pulled from school due to illness and confined to a bed. A year later, Petruccio, his father Giovanni, and older brother Federico are arrested and then hanged in the Piazza della Signoria on the orders of Rodrigo Borgia and Uberto Alberti.

=== Annetta ===
Annetta (1457–1511) (voiced by Anne-Marie Baron) is the Auditore family's live-in servant. In 1476, she leaves Florence with Ezio, Claudia, and Maria and moves into the estate of Mario Auditore in Monteriggioni, but later returns to Florence to be with her sister, Paola. She dies under unknown circumstances around 1511.

=== Cristina Vespucci ===
Cristina Vespucci (1459–1498) (voiced by Amber Goldfarb), based on Simonetta Vespucci, is a well-known Florentine beauty, and a favorite of painters; most notably Sandro Botticelli, who uses her as a model for several of his paintings. She is the cousin of the Italian explorer, financier, navigator and cartographer Amerigo Vespucci. Cristina is introduced as Ezio's first love interest in Assassin's Creed II, though most of her story is told during the "Repressed Memory Sequences" from Assassin's Creed: Brotherhood. When Ezio has to leave for Monteriggioni, he asks Cristina to come with him, but she refuses, as she does not want to leave her family behind. Ezio accepts her decision and gives her a pendant to remember him by. In 1478, Cristina marries Manfredo Soderini, more because of her father's will than her own. The day before their wedding, Ezio returns to Florence and visits Cristina, unaware of the direction her life has taken. Cristina tells Ezio she did not expect him to return and reveals her engagement. Even though he is heartbroken, Ezio appeals to Manfredo's conscience, and tells him to stop gambling and be a good husband. Years later, Cristina and her husband travel to Venice for Carnevale. Ezio, who also happens to be in the city, tries to use this opportunity to reconnect with her, only to be rejected, as Cristina tells him that she loved him, but he left her to be married to another man. During the bonfire of the vanities in 1498, Cristina, due to her noble status, is attacked by Girolamo Savonarola's fanatics. Ezio comes to her aid, but she is mortally wounded. Cristina shows him the pendant he gave her twenty-two years ago, and says she wished for another chance with him before dying in his arms.

=== Mario Auditore ===
Mario Auditore (19 March 1434 – 2 January 1500) (voiced by Fred Tatasciore) is Giovanni Auditore's older brother and Ezio's uncle. He is a condottiero and nobleman who stays at Villa Auditore in Monteriggioni and patrols the Tuscan countryside, as well as the Mentor of the Italian Assassins from at least 1476 until his death. In 1440, he starts his military career when he plays an important role in the Battle of Anghiari: on an expedition to Monterchi with his father, he alerts Micheletto Attendolo to the surprise advance of Milanese troops. The attack is foiled and the Florentines win the battle. He then defends Monteriggioni's interests by derailing Florentine attempts to seize Tuscan territory. After Giovanni's death, he brings his children and wife to the Villa and teaches Ezio about the conflict between Assassins and Templars, eventually inducting him into the Assassin Brotherhood in 1488. Mario is later killed by Cesare Borgia during his attack on Monteriggioni in early 1500.

=== Leonardo da Vinci ===
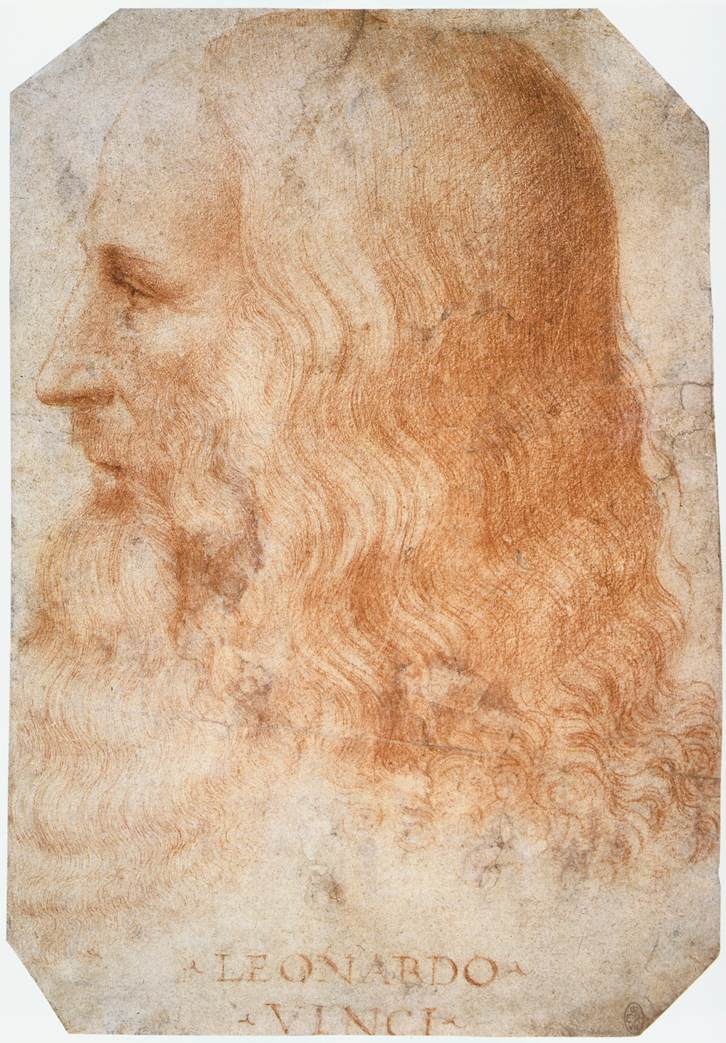
Portrait of Leonardo da Vinci by Francesco Melzi

Leonardo di ser Piero da Vinci (15 April 1452 – 2 May 1519) (voiced by Carlos Ferro) was an Italian Renaissance polymath and ally of the Assassin Brotherhood. His lifelong friendship with Ezio begins when Maria has Ezio help Leonardo move some paintings from his new workshop. Leonardo comments that his current work lacks purpose, but Maria is confident that he will go on to do great things. After Ezio's father and brothers are executed, Ezio brings two objects from his father's study to Leonardo: a broken hidden blade and a Codex page written by Altaïr. Leonardo repairs the blade and deciphers the Codex, fascinated by the technological secrets it alludes to. As Ezio continues his Assassin training, Leonardo makes several upgrades to Ezio's weapons and armor, including a poison blade, gun, and poison dart launcher. Some time after Ezio foils the Pazzi conspiracy, Leonardo receives a commission from a Venetian noble, prompting him to set up a new workshop in Venice. As Ezio had his own business in the city, he accompanies him. Leonardo develops an interest in flight, and invents an experimental flying machine, which Ezio uses on one of his missions. After seeing the Apple of Eden, Leonardo marvels at the futuristic visions it shows him. He then develops an interest in Pythagoras's findings, and is able to create a map leading to a temple built by his followers. Leonardo is blackmailed by Cesare Borgia into designing Templar war machines, but secretly continues to support Ezio until he is kidnapped by a third party, the Cult of Hermes, who want him to lead them to the Temple of Pythagoras. He is rescued by Ezio and explores the temple, fascinated by the numeric codes found within. Although Leonardo does not appear in Assassin's Creed: Revelations, its novelization describes him dying peacefully at his home in Amboise, with his friends, including Ezio, at his side. In Assassin's Creed III, the Davenport Homestead's residential carpenter obtains some of Leonardo's blueprints and, at Connor's request, builds a prototype replica of the original flying machine.

=== Lorenzo de' Medici ===
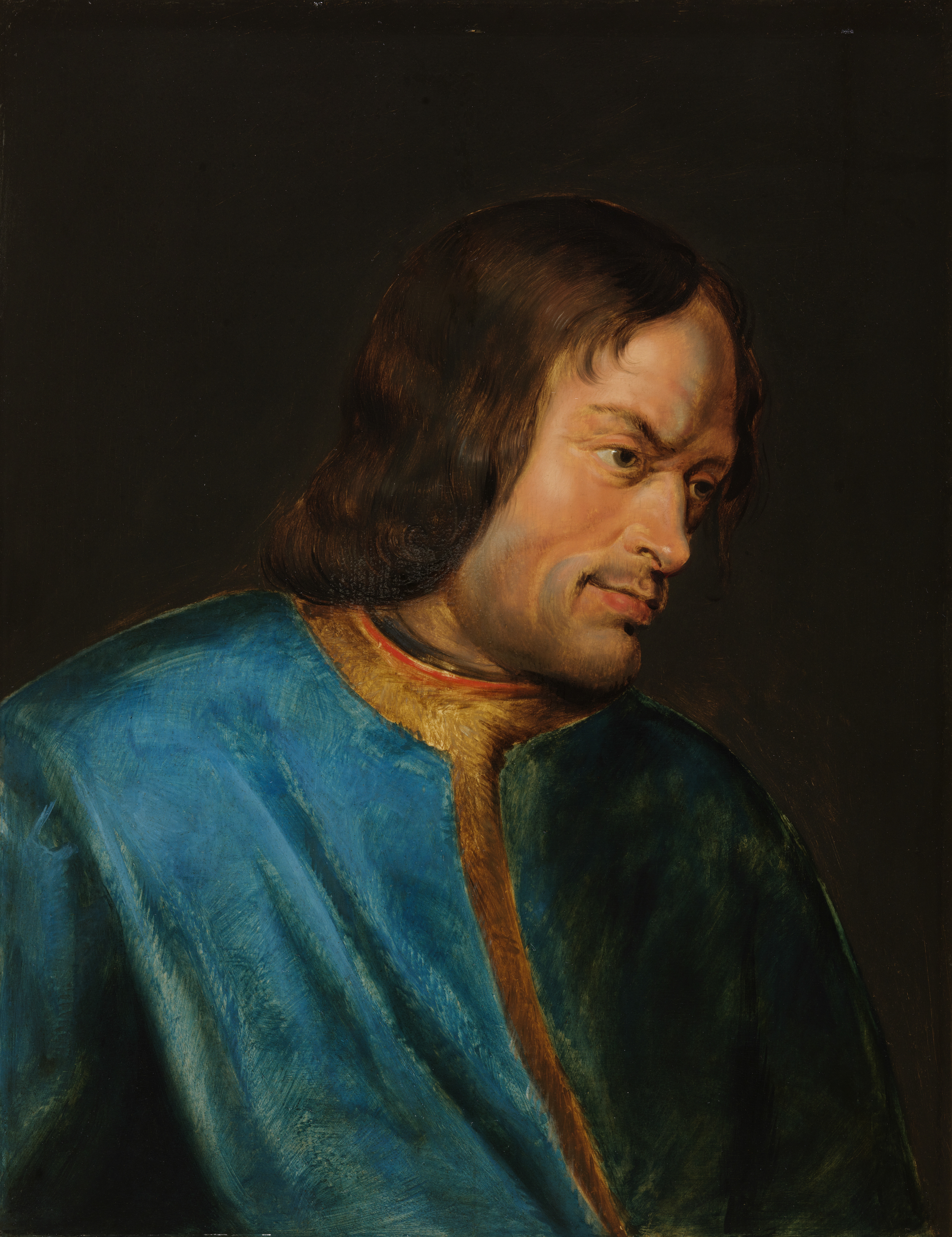
Portrait of Lorenzo de' Medici by Peter Paul Rubens (17th century)

Lorenzo de' Medici (1 January 1449 – 9 April 1492) (voiced and played by Alex Ivanovici) was an Italian statesman and de facto ruler of the Florentine Republic during the Italian Renaissance. Known as "il Magnifico" (the Magnificent) by contemporary Florentines, he was a diplomat, politician and patron of scholars, artists, and poets. His life coincided with the high point of the early Italian Renaissance. His death in 1492 marked the end of the Golden Age of Florence, as the end of his life also meant the end of the fragile peace he had helped maintain between the various Italian states. In Assassin's Creed: Lineage and Assassin's Creed II, Lorenzo is portrayed as an ally of the Assassins, particularly the House of Auditore, working closely with Giovanni against the corrupt Rodrigo Borgia. After Giovanni's death, Lorenzo is saved by Ezio during the Pazzi conspiracy, which starts a long-term partnership between them, with Ezio carrying out several assassination contracts for him.

=== Caterina Sforza ===
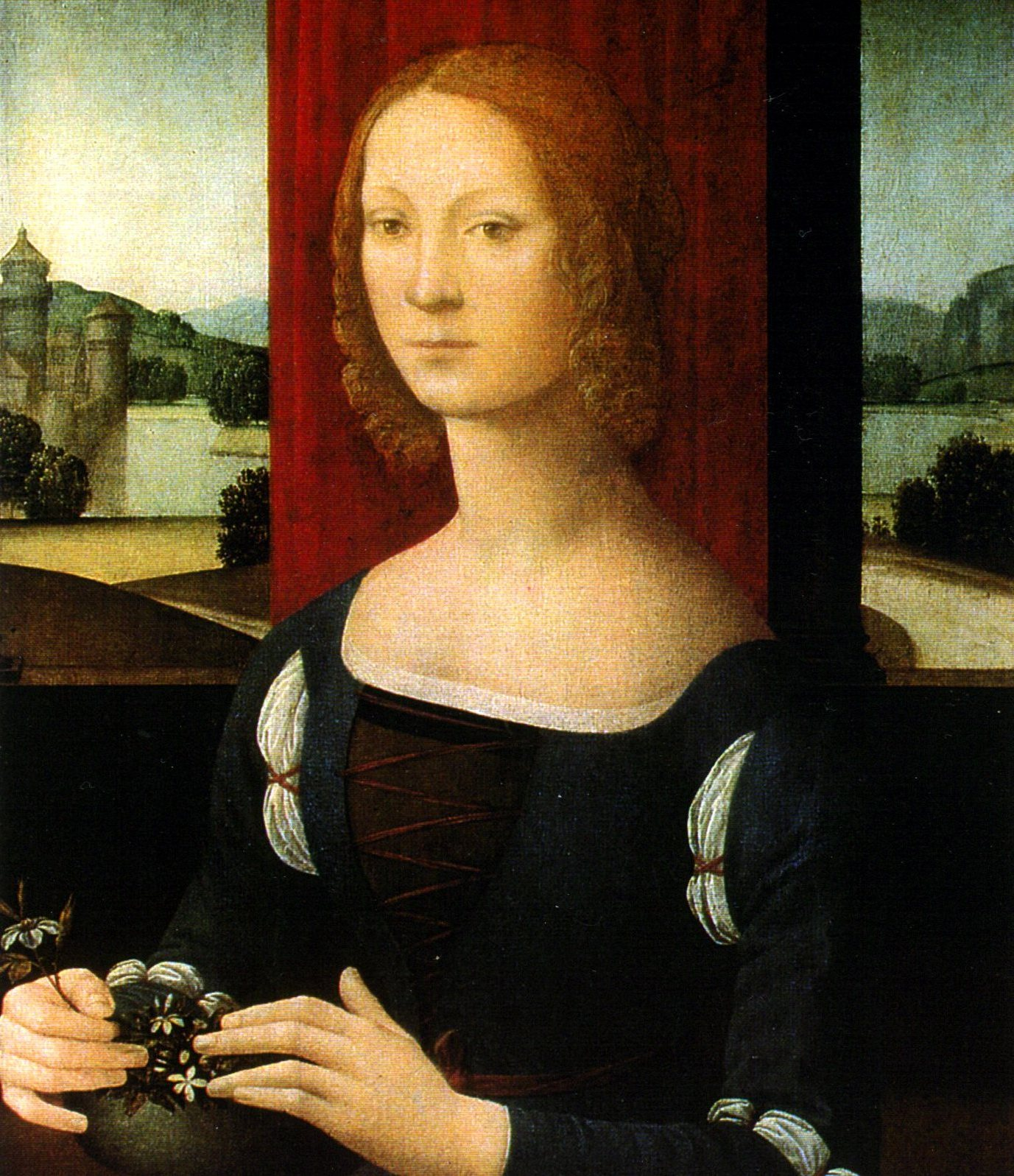
La dama dei gelsomini, by Lorenzo di Credi, presumed portrait of Caterina Sforza

Caterina Sforza (1463 – 28 May 1509) (voiced by Cristina Rosato) was the Countess of Forlì and Imola, and the daughter of Galeazzo Maria Sforza, the Duke of Milan. She was engaged to Pope Sixtus IV's nephew, Girolamo Riario, at only 10 years of age, and consummated the marriage at 14. As the countess of Forlì, she becomes a strong ally of the Assassin Brotherhood, meeting Ezio after her husband Girolamo traps her on a small island in Romagna. Eight years later, Caterina has the Orsi brothers kill her husband after finding out that he was working for the Templars and for being a poor husband. Caterina offers to keep the Apple of Eden safe in Forlì, but she, Ezio, and Niccolò Machiavelli find the city taken by the Orsi brothers, who were hired by the Templars. Retaking the city, Ezio saves Caterina's children from the Orsi and kills them, though the Apple is stolen from him by a mysterious monk. In 1500, Caterina travels to the Italian Assassins' headquarters in Monteriggioni, requesting help against Cesare Borgia's army. Monteriggioni is besieged by Cesare the next day, causing the town to be destroyed and Caterina to be captured. The next year, Caterina is transported to the Castel Sant'Angelo in Rome to be jailed. Ezio infiltrates the Castel and frees Caterina with a key taken from Lucrezia Borgia. A few weeks later, Caterina returns to Florence to await the restoration of her lands. However, her request to Pope Julius II is rejected, and Caterina ultimately dies in Florence from pneumonia in 1509.

=== Niccolò Machiavelli ===
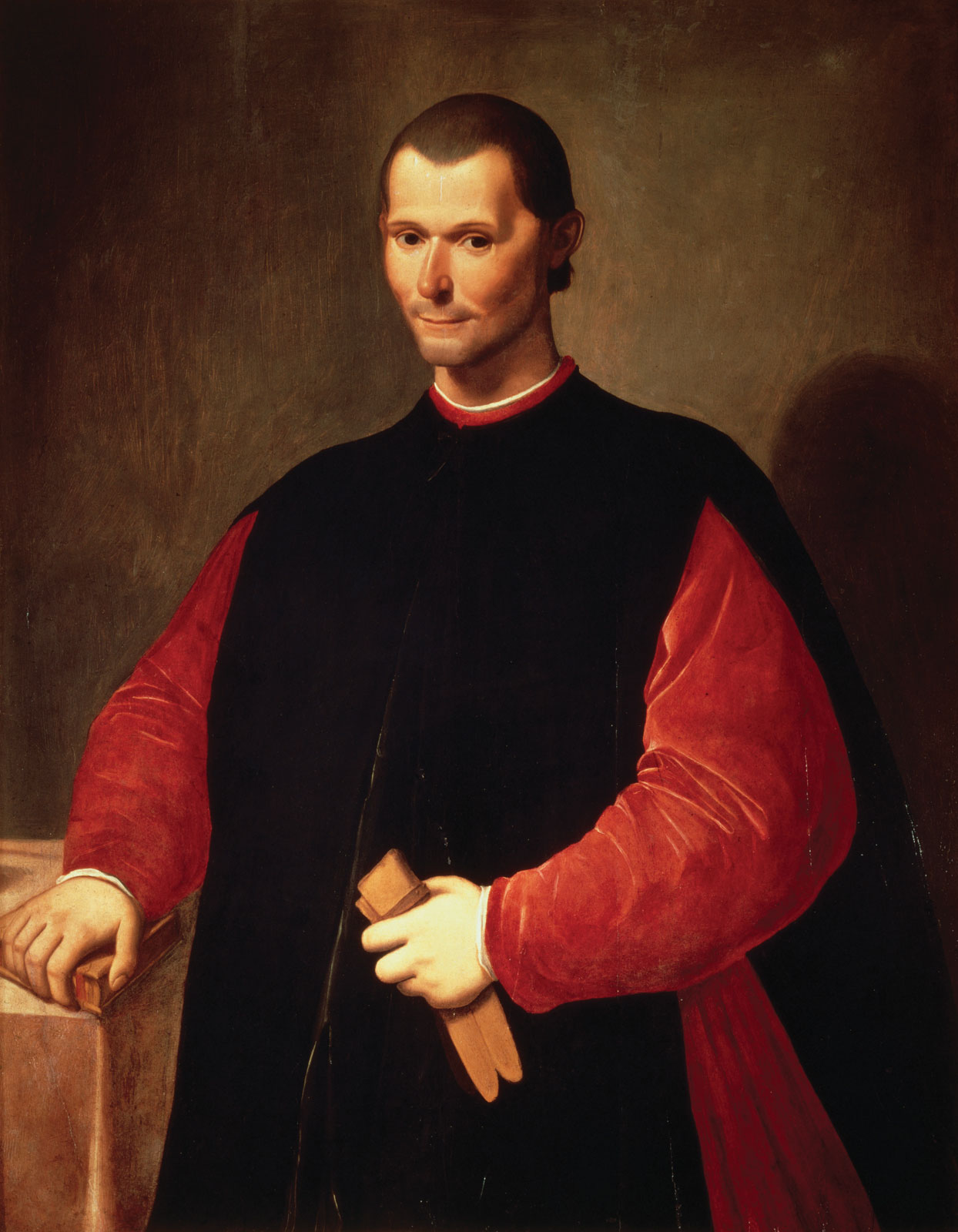
Portrait of Niccolò Machiavelli by Santi di Tito

Niccolò di Bernardo dei Machiavelli (3 May 1469 – 21 June 1527) (voiced by Shawn Baichoo), or simply Niccolò Machiavelli, is a supporting character in Assassin's Creed II, Assassin's Creed: Brotherhood, and related media. He is an Italian philosopher, writer, and a member of the Italian Brotherhood of Assassins. Within the Brotherhood, he primarily works with Ezio, and helps him with driving the Orsi brothers from Forlì and removing the friar Girolamo Savonarola from power in Florence to obtain the Apple of Eden from him. Following Mario Auditore's death in early 1500, Machiavelli becomes the de facto leader of the Italian Assassins, and names Ezio his successor in 1503. Together with Ezio and the other Assassin, he fights against the corrupt Borgia family and their Templar allies, ultimately succeeding in removing them from power.

=== Paola ===
Paola (1438 – unknown) (voiced by Claudia Ferri) is the madame of La Rosa Colta, the most popular brothel in Florence, and a member of the Italian Brotherhood of Assassins. In 1446, she was orphaned when her parents were killed at sea, so she began her life of prostitution on the streets until 1454. In 1458 she is arrested for murdering a city guard, and Giovanni Auditore represents her in court, winning the case on a self-defence plea. She is released from prison and starts her own brothel to protect other unfortunate women of the street. Following Giovanni's death in 1476, she guides Ezio in his path to become an Assassin, teaching him how to pickpocket and use crowds of people to hide from city guards. She is later present for Ezio's initiation into the Brotherhood in 1488, and the attack on the Vatican in 1499, creating a distraction alongside other Assassins to allow Ezio to confront Rodrigo Borgia. It is unknown when she died, though in 1512 Ezio's sister Claudia, with whom she had become close friends, mentioned that Paola was still alive and leading the Assassins.

=== La Volpe ===
Gilberto (voiced by Vito DeFilippo), known mainly as La Volpe (English: The Fox), is the leader of the Florentine and Roman Thieves' Guilds, and a member of the Italian Brotherhood of Assassins. Very little is known about his life outside of what is depicted in the games. In 1478, La Volpe assists Ezio in locating an important Templar meeting in Florence, which results in Ezio preventing the Pazzi conspiracy. Ten years later, La Volpe is present for Ezio's induction into the Brotherhood. In 1499, he helps his fellow Assassins attack the Vatican as a distraction to allow Ezio to confront Rodrigo Borgia. After the fall of Monteriggioni in early 1500, La Volpe moves to Rome, where fights the Borgia influence in the city. However, he refuses to work with the Assassins because of his suspicions towards Niccolò Machiavelli. After Ezio helps save some of his thieves and uncovers the identity of the real traitor, La Volpe agrees to assist the Assassins again.

=== Antonio de Magianis ===
Antonio de Magianis (1443 – unknown) (voiced by Carlo Mestroni) is the leader of the Gilda dei Ladri di Venezia (the Venetian Thieves' Guild) and a member of the Italian Brotherhood of Assassins. He was born at the very bottom of Venetian society, son of a cobbler, while his mother was a live-in maid for the Bellini family. He taught himself to read and write between the apprenticeship sessions with his father, then applied to the University of Padua. He was denied entry due to his low social rank, and was also rejected by other schools in Italy. In 1469, he robbed a noble Venetian estate owned by the rector of the University of Padua, and was later incarcerated, but mysteriously escaped from prison. Antonio serves as one of Ezio's most prominent allies during his time in Venice, and is later present for his initiation into the Brotherhood in 1488, as well as the attack on the Vatican in 1499, where he creates a distraction alongside other Assassins to allow Ezio to confront Rodrigo Borgia.

=== Rosa ===
Rosa (1460 – unknown) (voiced by Lita Tresierra) is a member of the Venetian Thieves' Gild and an ally of the Assassins. As the daughter of an unknown Venetian nobleman and a prostitute, she grew up on her own on the streets of Venice. In 1475, she met Antonio de Magianis while attempting to pickpocket him; Antonio caught her, but was impressed by her skills and took her on as a pupil. Rosa becomes a close friend and love interest of Ezio during his time in Venice, and later replaces Claudia as the madame of the Rosa in Fiore in Rome, after the latter abandons the position in 1504.

=== Teodora Contanto ===
Teodora Contanto (1450 – unknown) (voiced by Nadia Verrucci) is the madame of La Rosa della Virtù, the most popular brothel in Venice, and a member of the Italian Brotherhood of Assassins. Her parents owned a jewellery store, and she was apprenticed to her mother as a shop girl. On 26 November 1467, she engaged in adultery with a married man, and his wife alerted the Venetian courts, so her parents sent her to a nunnery to live the rest of her life in prayer and silence. In 1467, she entered Santa Maria degli Angeli, determined to do penance for her crime, but in 1473 she deserted the Church and abandoned her family name. That same year she opened La Rosa della Virtù, which came to be frequented by Pietro Bembo. Teodora mentors Ezio in the Assassin ways during his time in Venice, and is later present for his initiation into the Brotherhood in 1488, as well as the attack on the Vatican in 1499, where she creates a distraction alongside other Assassins to allow Ezio to confront Rodrigo Borgia.

=== Bartolomeo d'Alviano ===
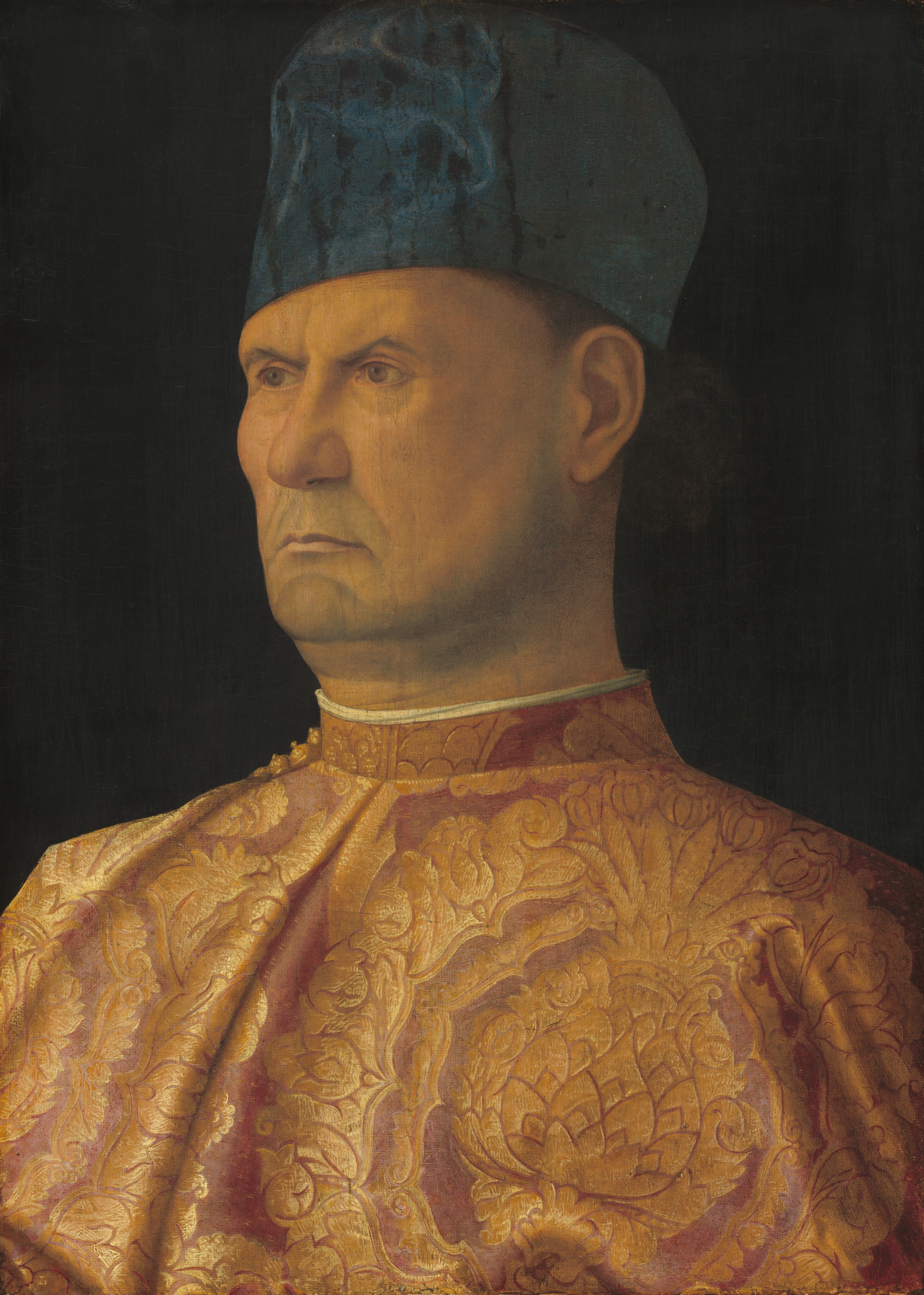
Possible portrait of Bartolomeo d'Alviano by Giovanni Bellini

Bartolomeo d'Alviano (1455 – 7 October 1515) (voiced by Alex Ivanovici) is a condottiero, the leader of the Venetian and Roman Mercenaries' Guilds, and a member of the Italian Brotherhood of Assassins. In 1486, he befriends Ezio and works with him to reconquer Venice's Castello District from the Templars. He is later present for Ezio's initiation into the Brotherhood in 1488, and for the attack on the Vatican in 1499, where he creates a distraction alongside other Assassins to allow Ezio to confront Rodrigo Borgia. In 1500, he moves to Rome alongside his second wife, Pantasilea Baglioni, and helps the Assassins fight the Borgia influence in the city, while also fending off French forces led by Cesare Borgia's ally, Octavian de Valois. Bartolomeo is ultimately victorious when Ezio assassinates Valois in 1503. Later in life, Bartolomeo would serve as a general in several Italian armies, until his defeat at the Battle of Agnadello in 1509, where he was captured and held prisoner by the French for four years. After his release, he continued his military career for a few more years, until his death during the siege of Brescia in October 1515.

=== Duccio de Luca ===
Duccio de Luca (1462 – 1520) (voiced by Shawn Baichoo) is a recurring character in Assassin's Creed II, Brotherhood, and Revelations, whose interactions with Ezio are mostly played for comedic effect. He is a Florentine nobleman who was set to marry Ezio's sister Claudia in 1476; however, due to his womanizing nature, he ends up sleeping with at least six other women. When Claudia finds out about this, she asks Ezio to deal with Duccio, leading him to beat the unfaithful fiancé and warn him to stay away from his sister. Years later, Duccio becomes a trader, but finds little success in making a profit. In 1506, while in Rome on business, he learns that Claudia has become the madame of the Rosa in Fiore brothel, and runs into Ezio again, who is searching for three Leonardo da Vinci paintings Duccio had acquired. After insulting Claudia, enraging Ezio, Duccio summons his henchmen to help him fight the Assassin, but is again defeated and knocked unconscious. In 1511, Duccio somehow ends up in Constantinople, where he attempts to flirt with Sofia Sartor, who shows no interest in him, only to run away terrified at the sight of Ezio, whom he calls the "devil". Duccio would later die penniless in Rome in 1520, from rabies which he most likely received from a stray dog.

=== Alvise da Vilandino ===
Alvise da Vilandino (1441 – 1500) is a Venetian baggage handler who enlists in the navy. In 1500, he is tasked with defending the fortress of Modon from the Turks. After a heavy night of drinking, he wakes to Turkish cannon fire bombarding the town. Panicking while running across the deck, he trips, hits his head, and drowns. He is accused of negligence by the ship's captain and erased from the logs of the navy.

=== Rodrigo Borgia ===
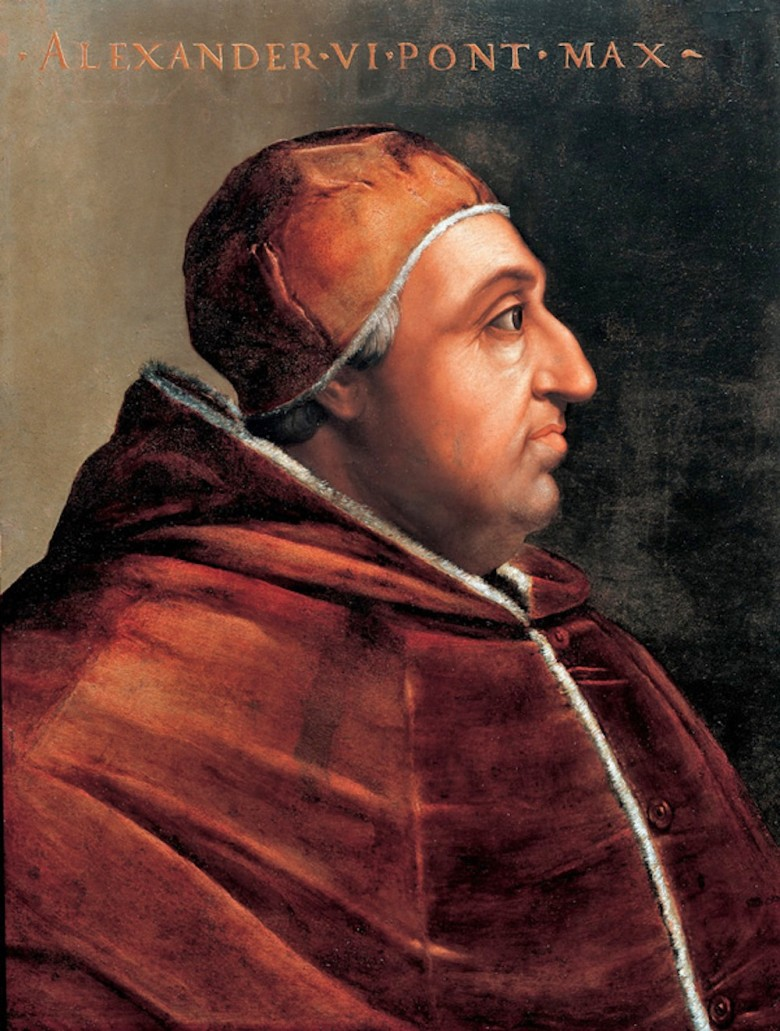
Portrait of Pope Alexander VI

Rodrigo Borgia (1 January 1431 – 18 August 1503) (voiced and played by Manuel Tadros) is the main antagonist of Assassin's Creed: Lineage and Assassin's Creed II, and a minor antagonist in Assassin's Creed: Brotherhood. Also known as Roderic Llançol and Roderic de Borja i Borja, he was born into a noble Aragonese family, the Borgias, and became a cardinal, and later Pope Alexander VI in 1492. In the games, he is also secretly the Grand Master of the Italian Rite of the Templar Order during the Renaissance, and forms alliances with influential families such as the Pazzi and the Barbarigos as part of his plot to secure control of Italy in the name of the Templars. He manipulates events behind the scenes, and seeks to unlock "the Vault" underneath the Vatican Palace, believing it contains the power to enslave humanity. He is ultimately defeated by Ezio in 1499, but the latter spares his life, despite Rodrigo being responsible for the death of his father and brothers. Following his defeat, Rodrigo, no longer seeking power, decides to focus on his papacy, leaving his son Cesare to lead the Templars and the Papal army. Using Rodrigo's resources, Cesare wages war on other Italian states and the Assassins, while ignoring his father's warnings, who comes to fear Cesare's lust for power. In 1503, Rodrigo tries to poison him, but Cesare is warned of this by his sister Lucrezia, and kills his father in the ensuing struggle.

=== Uberto Alberti ===
Uberto Alberti (1416 – 31 December 1476) (voiced and played by Michel Perron) is a self taught lawyer, Florence's Gonfaloniere of Justice, and a friend and ally of Lorenzo de' Medici and the Auditore family. However, at some point before 1476, he is secretly turned to the Templar cause, and agrees to eliminate the Auditores to facilitate the Templars' plot to take over Florence. He orders the arrest of all Auditore men, and although Giovanni, Federico, and Petruccio Auditore are captured, Ezio manages to escape. After the arrest, Ezio is sent by his father to find documents to give to Uberto to prove their innocence, but he betrays them and has them hanged the following day on the charge of treason. Shortly after, Uberto is assassinated by Ezio in the courtyard of the Santa Croce church. His death is considered one of the most satisfying deaths in video games.

=== Vieri de' Pazzi ===
Vieri de' Pazzi (1459 – 14 April 1478) (voiced by Yuri Lowenthal) is a Florentine nobleman and the youngest member of the Pazzi family, as well as a member of the Templar Order. He spends his father's money frivolously on weaponry, exotic animals and clothes. Fiercely competitive, he hosts running races, boating and horseback riding, but all of them are rigged; when he loses, he invites the winner's entire family for a victory poisoned dinner. He is secretly trained by his father, Francesco, in the Templar ways and assists in the plot to take over Florence. Vieri develops a rivalry with Ezio, who ultimately kills him during a confrontation in San Gimignano in 1478.

=== Francesco de' Pazzi ===
Francesco de' Pazzi (28 January 1444 – 26 April 1478) (voiced by Andreas Apergis) is a Florentine banker, a member of the Pazzi noble family, and Vieri de Pazzi's father. He is also a member of the Templar Order and one of the instigators the Pazzi conspiracy, a plot to remove the Medici from power in Florence. In 1478, Francesco and other conspirators attempt to assassinate Lorenzo and Giuliano de' Medici, and while they succeed in killing the latter, Lorenzo is saved by Ezio's interference. Shortly after, Ezio tracks down and kills Francesco, before his naked body is hanged from the Palazzo della Signoria to serve as a warning to the Templars. Historically, Francesco was hanged from the window of the Sala dei Duecento by an angry Florentine mob after the failure of the Pazzi conspiracy.

=== Jacopo de' Pazzi ===
Jacopo de' Pazzi (1421 – 3 January 1480) (voiced by Arthur Grosser) is the head of the Pazzi family, Francesco de' Pazzi's uncle, and a member of the Templar Order. As one of the conspirators involved in the Pazzi plot, he is tasked with calming the Florentine citizens after the assassination of the Medici. However, the conspiracy fails due to Ezio's interference, and Jacopo is later stabbed by Rodrigo Borgia, the Templar Grand Master, for his failure, before being put out of his misery by Ezio. Historically, Jacopo did not die two years after the failed Pazzi conspiracy, but was executed alongside other members of his family in 1478 by an angry Florentine mob.

=== Bernardo di Bandino Baroncelli ===
Bernardo di Bandino Baroncelli (1453 – 3 May 1479) (voiced by Tod Fennell) is a banker employed by the Pazzi, a member of the Templar Order, and one of the instigators of the Pazzi conspiracy; wishing to see the Medici displaced from Florence due to their exlie of his cousins. He is tracked down and killed by Ezio in San Gimignano after the failure of the Pazzi plot. Historically, Baroncelli fled to Constantinople, but was later arrested and brought back to Florence, where he was hanged on 29 December 1479.

=== Stefano da Bagnone ===
Stefano da Bagnone (1418 – 1479) (voiced by Tony Robinow) is a monk and the secretary of Jacopo de' Pazzi who trained in Rome as a torturer. He is also a member of the Templar Order, and one of the instigators of the Pazzi conspiracy. After the failure of the plot, he is tracked down and killed by Ezio at a monastery near San Gimignano. Historically, Bagnone was a priest who, following the failed assassination attempt on Lorenzo de' Medici, fled Florence and found refuge among monks, but was soon arrested, tortured, and finally hanged on 3 May 1478.

=== Antonio Maffei da Volterra ===
Father Antonio Maffei da Volterra (1450 – 1478) (voiced and played by Shawn Baichoo) is a Florentine priest employed by Lorenzo de' Medici. After witnessing the sacking of his hometown of Volterra by mercenaries, he blames it on Lorenzo and joins the Templar Order to exact revenge on him; becoming one of the instigators of the Pazzi conspiracy. He is tracked down and killed by Ezio in San Gimignano after the failure of the plot. Historically, Maffei found refuge in Badia Fiorentina following the failed assassination attempt on Lorenzo, but was quickly found and arrested, and subsequently hanged on 3 May 1478.

=== Francesco Salviati ===
Francesco Salviati Riario (1443 – 12 April 1479) was the Archbishop of Pisa from 1474 until his death, and one of the Pazzi conspirators; wishing to see the Medici removed from power for opposing his appointment as Archbishop of Florence. He joins the Templar Order to this end, but is ultimately killed by Ezio at his villa in the Tuscan countryside after the failure of the Pazzi plot. While in the game Salviati's role was simply to lead Pazzi-allied troops into Florence, historically he was one of the main instigators of the conspiracy, as he was supposed to kill Gonfaloniere Petrucci and take control of the Palazzo della Signoria. However, he was quickly arrested by Petrucci and then hanged from the window of the Sala dei Duecento by a Florentine mob, next to Francesco de' Pazzi.

=== Emilio Barbarigo ===
Emilio Barbarigo (1421 – 11 September 1485) (voiced by Arthur Holden) is a wealthy and influential Venetian merchant, and a member of the Barbarigo noble family and of the Templar Order. By funding the Venetian police force, he effectively controls the streets of Venice, using the guards to eliminate criminals, as well as any competition. He lives in a heavily guarded palace in the city's San Polo district, which he rules with an iron fist, terrorizing both merchants and thieves. Emilio also plays a role in the Pazzi conspiracy, supplying weapons to all those involved. With the help of the Venetian Thieves' Guild, Ezio infiltrates Emilio's palace and assassinates him in 1485, freeing San Polo of his tyrannical rule.

=== Carlo Grimaldi ===
Carlo Grimaldi (1445 – 14 September 1485) (voiced by Guy Chapellier) is a member of the Council of Ten, Venice's governing body, as well as of the Templar Order. Hailing from the House of Grimaldi, Carlo sought political power from a young age, which he achieved thanks to his friendship with the Doge of Venice, Giovanni Mocenigo. After proving his loyalty by exposing the relationship between the daughter of a Venetian politician and the son of a servant, Carlo was rewarded with a seat on the Council of Ten, and used his newfound position to aid the Templar cause. In 1485, Carlo tries to persuade the Doge to join the Templar Order, but fails, and so he is tasked with poisoning him so that a Templar may take his place. Ezio tries to prevent the assassination, but arrives moments too late. Carlo then frames the Assassin for the Doge's murder, but before he can escape, he is killed by Ezio in the courtyard of the Doge's Palace.

=== Marco Barbarigo ===
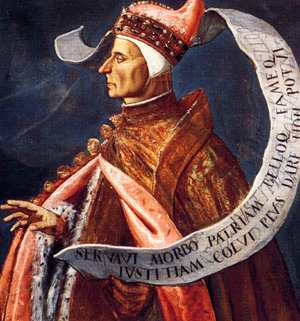
Portrait of Marco Barbarigo by Domenico Robust (16th century)

Marco Barbarigo (c. 1413 – 15 February 1486) (voiced by Tony Robinow; played by Frank Fontaine in Assassin's Creed: Lineage) was the Doge of Venice from 1485 until his death. In the game, he is portrayed as a member of the Templar Order, and becomes Doge after his predecessor, Giovanni Mocenigo, is poisoned by a fellow Templar, Carlo Grimaldi. Marco's tenure as Doge is short-lived because he is assassinated by Ezio during the Carnevale of 1486. After his death, his brother Agostino, a supporter of the Assassins, is instated as Doge.

=== Silvio Barbarigo ===
Silvio Barbarigo (1435 – 11 July 1486) (voiced and played by Harry Standjofsky), also known as Il Rosso (English: The Red One), is a member of the influential Barbarigo family and of the Templar Order. Following his father's assassination by his uncle, Silvio began working for the latter, eventually becoming his advisor after uncovering a plot by the Saranzo family against the Barbarigos. Years later, Silvio carried out his revenge against his uncle, and had him killed to take over his palace. By 1485, Silvio has become a prominent figure in Venice like his relatives Emilio and Marco Barbarigo, serving on the Supreme Tribunal as state inquisitor, and is in control of the city's Castello District. In 1486, while planning an expedition to Cyprus to retrieve an Apple of Eden, Silvio and his fellow Templar, Dante Moro, are killed by Ezio with the help of Bartolomeo d'Alviano.

=== Dante Moro ===
Dante Moro (1460 – 11 July 1486) was the captain of the Venetian city guard and heir to one of the most prestigious and affluent families in Venice. However, his life took a turn for the worse when his friend, Marco Barbarigo, decided he wanted Dante's wife for himself and hired assassins to kill him. Dante survived the attempt on his life, but was stabbed in the cranium, leaving him with permanent brain damage. Now having the mind of a child, Dante was easily persuaded to become Marco's bodyguard and divorce his wife, who was then forced to marry Marco, though she never lost hope Dante would one day recover. By 1485, Dante has begun serving other members of the Templar Order as well, essentially acting as their 'dumb muscle'. In 1486, he is killed by Ezio alongside his fellow Templar, Silvio Barbarigo.

=== Orsi Brothers ===
Checco (1458 – 7 July 1488) (voiced by Andreas Apergis) and Ludovico Orsi (1455 – 7 July 1488) are two mercenary brothers and associates of the Templar Order. Hailing from a noble family, they start a successful money-lending business, killing anyone who does not pay them back on time. In 1488, they are hired by Caterina Sforza to murder her husband Girolamo Riario after discovering he was a Templar and involved in the Pazzi conspiracy. The brothers agree to carry out the assassination because Girolamo owed them money. Not long after, Rodrigo Borgia hires the Orsi brothers to obtain a map to the pages of Altaïr's Codex made by Girolamo. To this end, they lead an army of mercenaries in a siege on Forlì, and kidnap Caterina's children. Ezio helps to defend the city and rescues the children, killing Ludovico in the process, but Checco manages to steal the Apple of Eden, which Ezio had left with Caterina. However, Checco would soon meet the same fate as his brother, being killed by Ezio just outside of Forlì, before he could deliver the Apple to the Templars.

=== Girolamo Savonarola ===
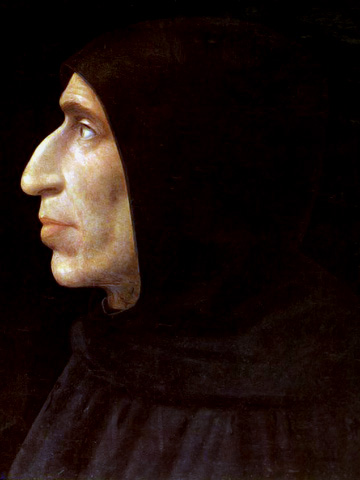
Portrait of Girolamo Savonarola by Fra Bartolomeo, c. 1498, Museo di San Marco, Florence

Girolamo Savonarola (21 September 1452 – 23 May 1498) (voiced by Alex Ivanovici) was a Dominican friar and the leader of Florence from 1494 to 1498. In 1488, Savonarola manages to steal an Apple of Eden from Ezio, who subsequently spends years searching for him to recover the artifact. Recognizing the Apple's powers, he uses it to instigate the Bonfire of the Vanities in Florence; hoping to cleanse the city of everything he regards as evil, such as art and wealth. He is ultimately removed from power by the Assassins in 1498, and then sentenced to death by the people of Florence. Although he is set to be burnt at the stake, Ezio ends Savonarola's life painlessly by stabbing him with his hidden blade.

== Characters of Assassin's Creed II: Discovery ==
=== Luis de Santángel ===
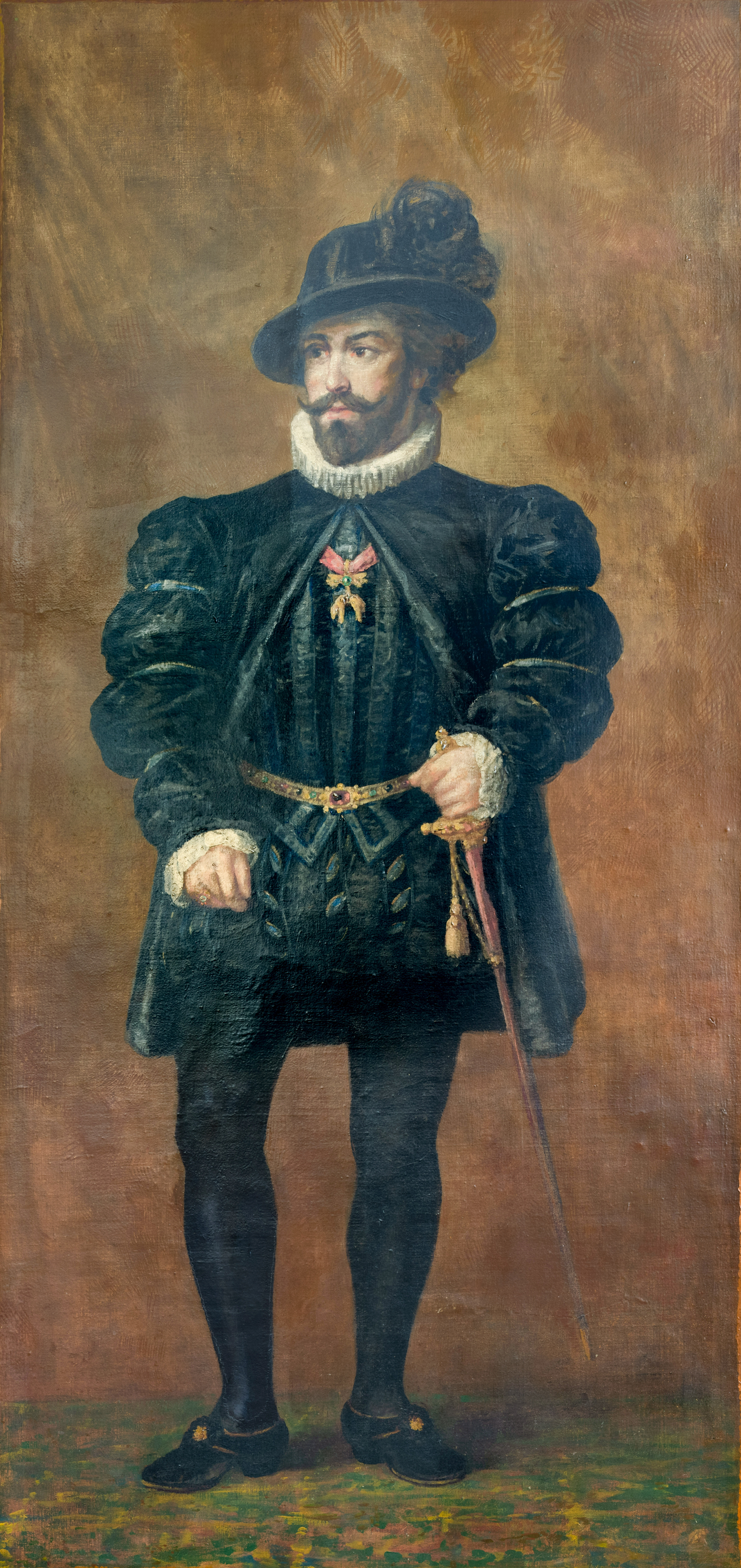
Luis de Santángel mural

Luis de Santángel (died 1498) (voiced by Adam Harrington) is the finance minister of King Ferdinand II of Aragon and Queen Isabella I of Castile, and a member of the Spanish Brotherhood of Assassins. He persuades the Queen to finance Christopher Columbus's voyage across the Atlantic Ocean, although he ends up paying for most of the expenses with his own money. Within the Brotherhood, he helps Ezio uncover and foil a Templar conspiracy to exploit the Granada War as a means to bankrupt the Castilian treasury and prevent Columbus's voyage. Later in life, Luis turns on Queen Isabella after she becomes corrupted by the Templars and makes plans to poison her, though he would die before he could see his plan come to fruition.

=== Raphael Sánchez ===
Raphael Sánchez (died 1505) (voiced by Chuck Kourouklis) is the treasurer of Queen Isabella I and a member of the Spanish Brotherhood of Assassins. He is based on Gabriel Sanchez, who was historically the royal treasurer of King Ferdinand II of Aragon. He fights against the Templars during the Spanish Inquisition, and helps Ezio rescue Assassins who have been arrested on the orders of Tomás de Torquemada in Aragon. Towards the end of the Granada War, Raphael works with Ezio and Luis de Santángel to thwart a Templar conspiracy to prevent Christopher Columbus's voyage across the Atlantic Ocean.

=== Christopher Columbus ===
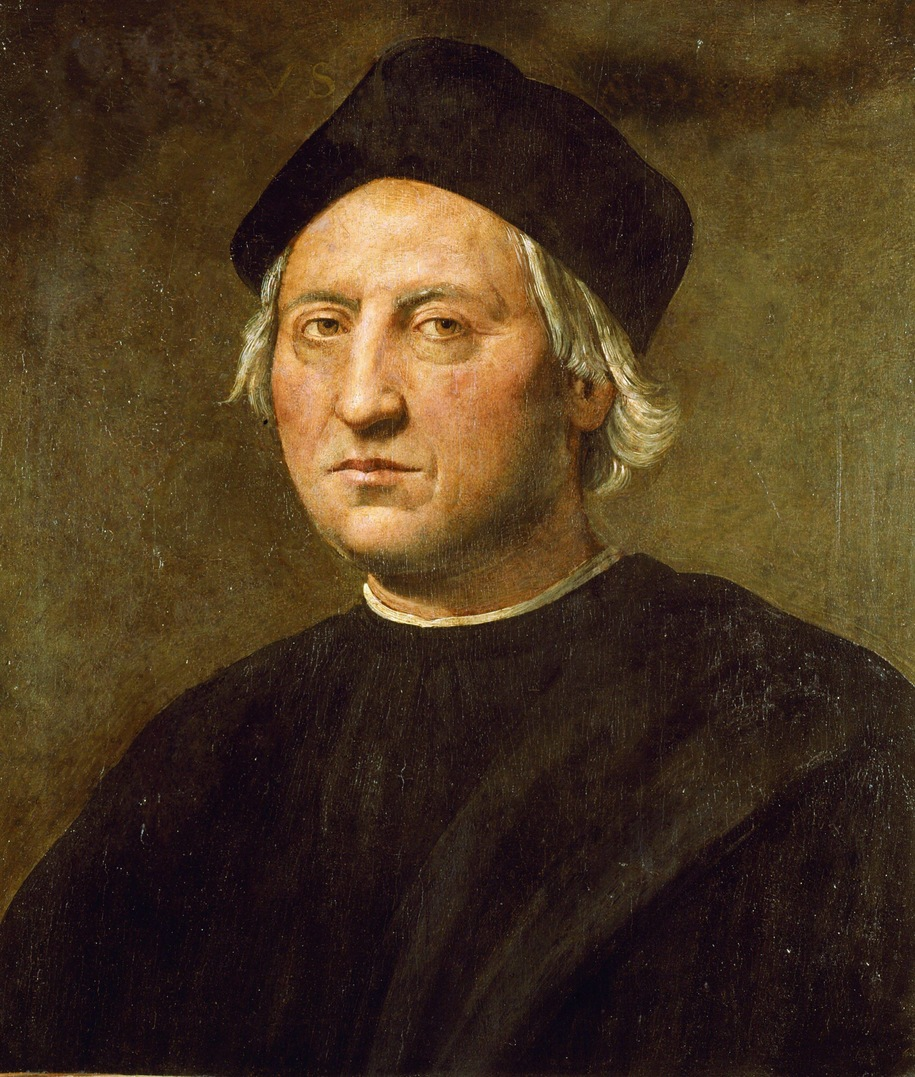
Portrait of Christopher Columbus by Ridolfo del Ghirlandaio (1520)

Christoffa Corombo (1451 – 20 May 1506) (voiced by Roger L. Jackson), better known by his anglicized name Christopher Columbus, was an Italian navigator and explorer who famously sailed across the Atlantic Ocean, allowing Europe to discover and begin colonizing the New World; his first voyage, sponsored by the Catholic Monarchs of Spain, was in 1492. In the game, the Templars seek to prevent this voyage by any means, because they wish to be the first to conquer the New World, leading the Assassins, mainly Ezio, to defend Columbus on several occasions. Despite this, Columbus does not appear to be aware of the existence of either of the two orders.

Columbus also makes a minor appearance in the Assassin's Creed film, where he is entrusted by Aguilar de Nerha with an Apple of Eden, which he takes to his grave.

=== Isabella I of Castile ===
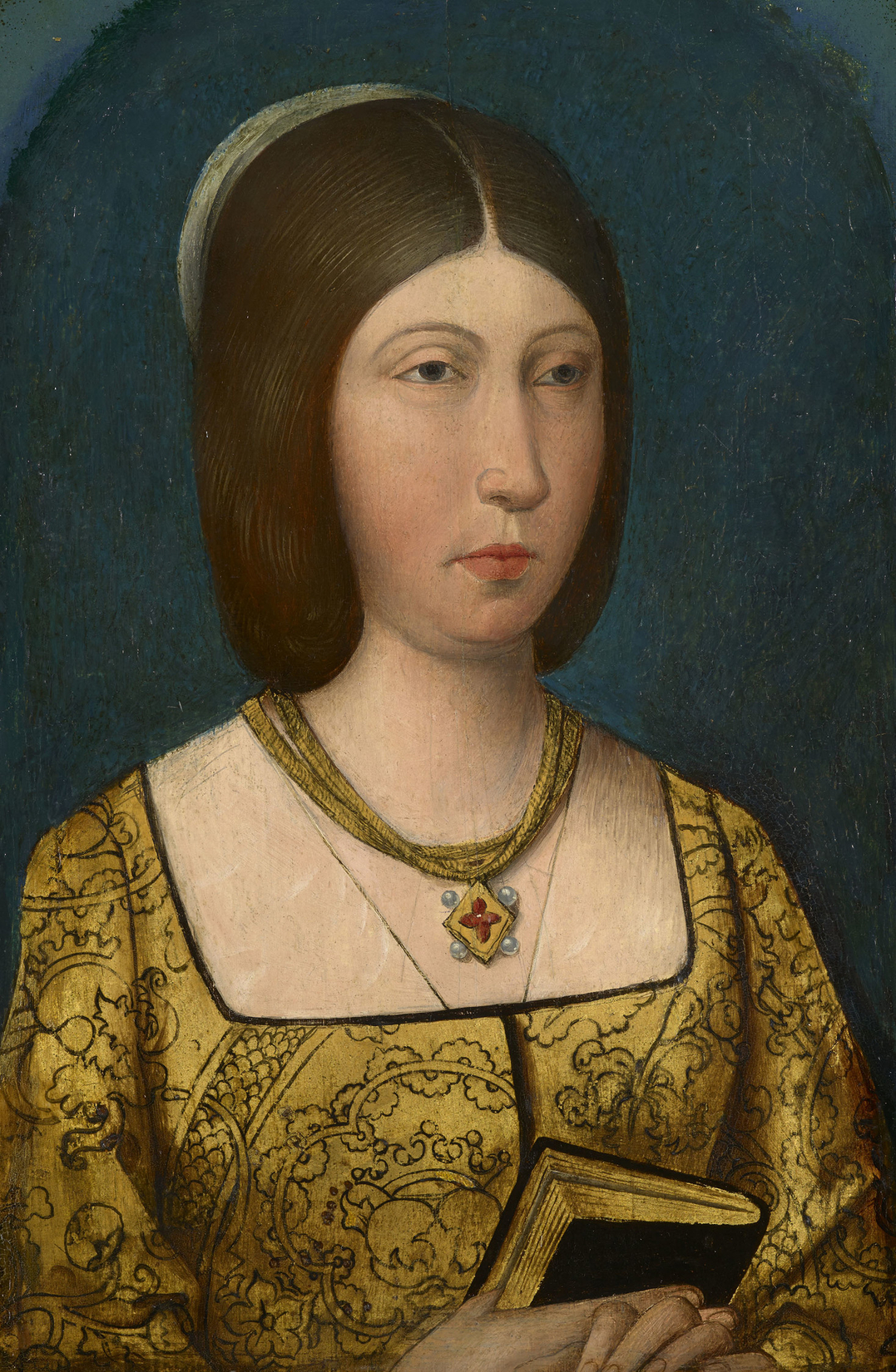
Isabella I of Castile

Queen Isabella I of Castile (22 April 1451 – 26 November 1504) (voiced by Nicole Vigil) was Queen of Castile from 1474 and, through her marriage to King Ferdinand II of Aragon, also Queen of Aragon. The two jointly ruled over a dynastically unified Spain in the late 15th-century, and are known together as the Catholic Monarchs of Spain. Isabella and Ferdinand are remembered for establishing the Spanish Inquisition in 1478 and funding Christopher Columbus's voyages across the Atlantic Ocean, which made Spain the first European power to discover and colonize the New World. During their reign, Spain also fought in the Granada War from 1482 to 1492, which resulted in Granada's defeat and annexation to Castile, effectively ending all Islamic rule on the Iberian peninsula. In the game, Isabella is depicted as an ally of the Assassins, though over time, she would be converted to the Templar cause, after they infiltrated her close circle and forced her to pledge loyalty to the Borgias. As a result, Isabella would die poisoned by the Assassins in 1504.

Queen Isabella also makes a minor appearance in the Assassin's Creed film, played by Marysia S. Peres.

=== Helene Dufranc ===
Helene Dufranc is a French adventurer whom Ezio encounters during his time in Spain. She was born into a family of Assassins just like him, but chose to put her talents to use as a mercenary rather than blindly follow the Creed. Helene and Ezio first meet in Barcelona when she briefly steals his sword, and the two develop a rivalry. After a few more encounters, however, and Helene helping Ezio foil an assassination attempt on Queen Isabella, the two ultimately part ways as allies. Helene is a character created exclusively for the iOS version of the game.

=== Gaspar Martínez ===
Gaspar Martínez (died 1491) (voiced by Doug Boyd) is a prosecutor for the Spanish Inquisition's tribunal in Barcelona. He is responsible for the arrests of the Assassins in the city, though he is unaware of their true nature, believing them to be simple heretics. He is assassinated by Ezio in his personal quarters in 1491.

=== Pedro Liorente ===
Pedro Liorente (died 1491) (voiced by Roger L. Jackson) is a calificador of the Spanish Inquisition serving under Tomás de Torquemada. He is killed by Ezio in Zaragoza in 1491.

=== Juan de Marillo ===
Juan de Marillo (died 1492) (voiced by Erik Braa) is an inquisitor serving under Tomás de Torquemada. Given the task of purging Granada of heretics following its conquest by Spain, he would not get the chance to carry it out due to his death at Ezio's hands in 1492.

== Characters of Assassin's Creed: Brotherhood ==
=== Angelina Ceresa ===
Angelina Ceresa (died 2 January 1500) is an acquaintance of Claudia Auditore, who lived in Monteriggioni. On 1 January 1500 she and Ezio help prepare Claudia's birthday party in the Villa Auditore. The following day, Angelina is killed when Cesare Borgia's forces besiege Monteriggioni, and her head is stuck upon the pike of a Borgia soldier's halberd.

=== Margherita dei Campi ===
Margherita dei Campi is a countess of Rome. She tends to Ezio's injuries, sustained during the attack on Monteriggioni, after Niccolò Machiavelli takes him to Margherita's house in Rome's northern Campagna District.

=== Fabio Orsini ===
Fabio Orsini (1476 – 29 December 1504) (voiced by Gianpaolo Venuta) is an Italian condottiero and a member of the Papal Guard. Hailing from the Orsini noble family, he is also the cousin of Bartolomeo d'Alviano and an ally of the Assassin Brotherhood. In 1494, he enters Montepulciano to help the Sienese. In 1498, he partners with Bartolomeo against the Savelli family, and seems to help his new in-laws when he marries Jeronima Borgia, Lucrezia Borgia's cousin. However, in 1499, while Cesare is in Romagna, he frees a friend imprisoned in the Tor di Nona, leading to Cesare killing Fabio's father Paolo as punishment. Starting with 1500, he supports the Assassins in crippling the Borgias' hold on Rome by providing them with a hideout and leading his forces against the army of Micheletto Corella, Cesare's bodyguard and assassin. However, he loses and becomes and outlaw raiding the countryside and put on a list of bandits published by the Pope. After Rodrigo Borgia's death at Cesare's hands in 1503, Fabio regains his noble title and enters the service of Pope Julius II, arresting Cesare on his orders. In December 1504, Fabio would die from a head injury sustained during the Battle of Garigliano.

=== Pantasilea Baglioni ===
Pantasilea Baglioni (1476 – 1537) (voiced by Millie Tresierra) is an Italian noblewoman, hailing from the Baglioni family, the rulers of Perugia, and the second wife of Bartolomeo d'Alviano. After moving to Rome with her husband, she helps him and the Assassins combat their enemies with her tactician skills. She also helps manage the Assassins' pigeon coops in the city, through which they receive information about their targets.

=== Egidio Troche ===
Egidio Troche (1436 – unknown) is a Roman Senator. His younger brother Francesco is a close confidant of Cesare Borgia, whom he personally dislikes. Egidio is rescued by Ezio from his debt to "The Banker", Juan Borgia, in return for providing the Assassins with several potential targets within Rome.

=== Cesare Borgia ===
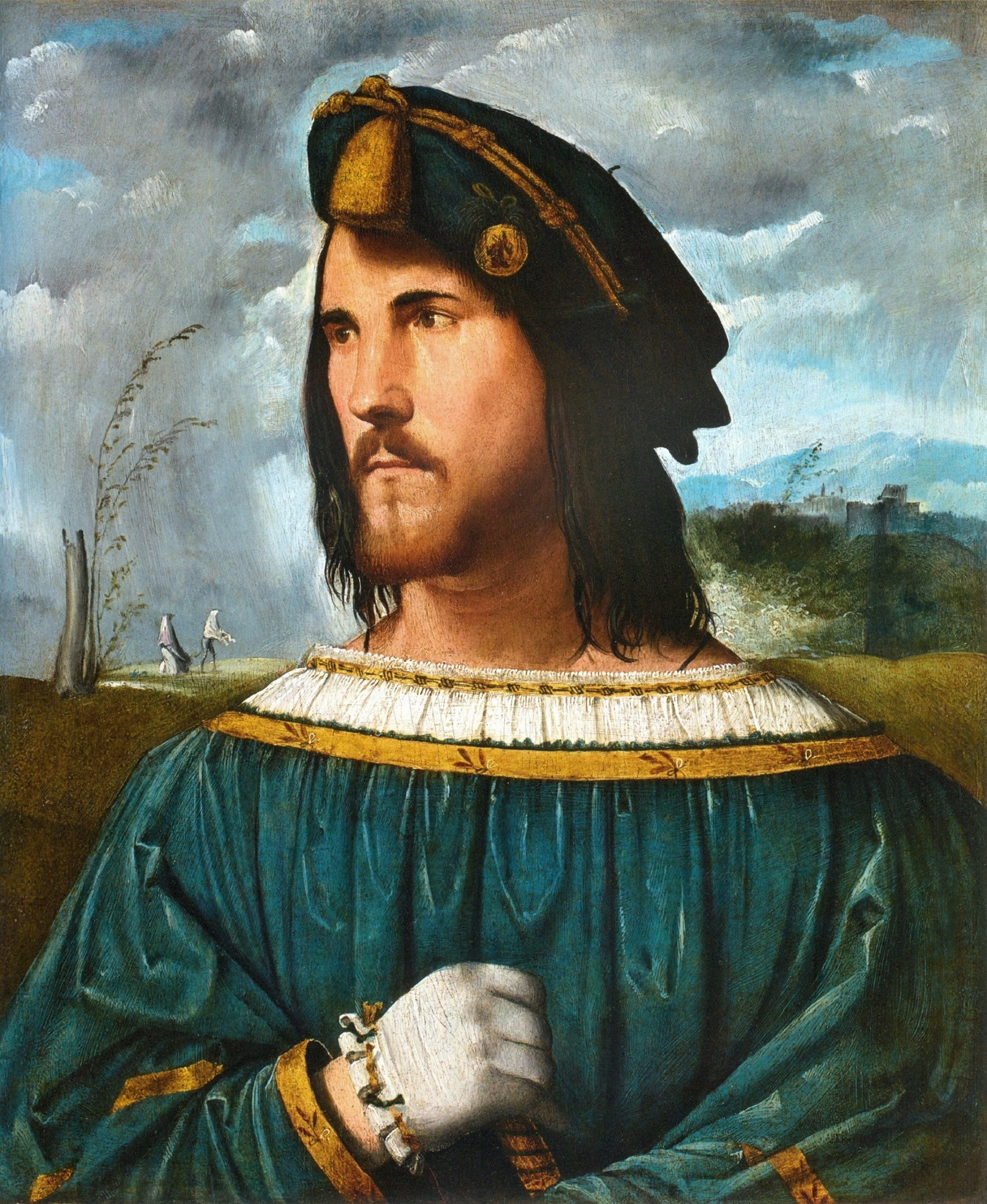
Portrait of a man traditionally said to be Cesare Borgia

Cesare Borgia (13 September 1475 – 12 March 1507) (voiced by Andreas Apergis) is the main antagonist of Assassin's Creed: Brotherhood. Historically, he was an Italian condottiero, nobleman, and the illegitimate son of Rodrigo Borgia, also known as Pope Alexander VI. In the game, he is portrayed as also being a high-ranking a member of the Italian rite of the Templar Order, becoming its de facto leader after Rodrigo stepped down in January 1500. After leading the Papal Army to many victories in the Italian Wars as Captain General, Cesare becomes sadistic and develops a lust for conquest, planning to unify all of Italy and conquer Spain. Seeing the Assassins as a potential threat to his plans and seeking the powerful Apple of Eden in their possession, he besieges their base in Monteriggioni in early 1500, but this only provokes them into targeting Cesare and his allies, much to Rodrigo's chagrin, who had just abandoned his feud with the Assassins. While Cesare is occupied with his conquests, Ezio and the other Assassins cripple his control over Rome and kill his lieutenants, weakening the Templar Order. When Rodrigo refuses to give Cesare any more money, fearing his lust for power, Cesare furiously confronts him but learns that his father has secretly poisoned him, and kills him in the ensuing struggle. Cesare survives the effects of the poison he was given, but loses the Apple to the Assassins, and is eventually arrested on the orders of Pope Julius II in 1503. After breaking out of prison in 1506, Cesare gains the support of his brother-in-law, John III of Navarre, and is given command of the Navarrese army. During the Siege of Viana in March 1507, Cesare is tracked down by Ezio, who fights him on the battlements of a crumbling castle. Cesare is ultimately defeated and thrown off the battlements to his death.

=== Lucrezia Borgia ===
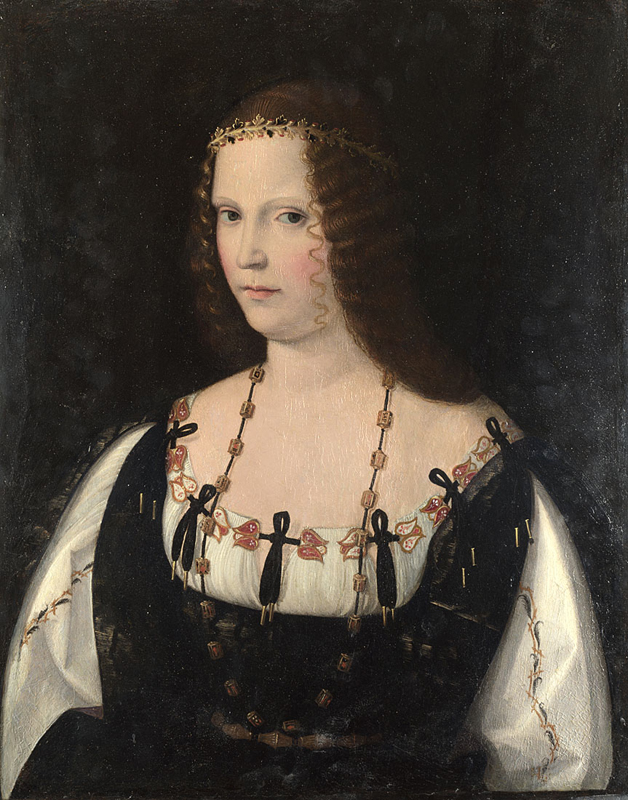
Possible portrait of Lucrezia Borgia, Bartolomeo Veneziano (c. 1510)

Lucrezia Borgia (18 April 1480 – 24 June 1519) (voiced by Liane Balaban) is an Italian noblewoman, the illegitimate daughter of Rodrigo Borgia and the younger sister of Cesare Borgia. Like her father and brother, she is also a member of the Templar Order. Lucrezia is first seen in a portrait in Assassin's Creed II as a little girl with brown hair, before appearing in Assassin's Creed: Brotherhood as a grown woman, her hair now blonde. Lucrezia is shown to have an incestuous affair with her brother, who repeatedly promises her that she will be his queen. She secures political advantages for her family by marrying powerful nobles and then having them disgraced or killed soon thereafter. Eventually, she grows tired of Cesare's womanizing ways and plans to leave the Vatican, but she still warns him of Rodrigo's attempt to poison him. In turn, Cesare beats Lucrezia until she reveals where Rodrigo hid the Apple of Eden seized from the Assassins. Disillusioned by his actions, she tells Ezio where to find the Apple before leaving the Vatican. Her in-game portrait reveals that she and her husband flee Rome and relocate to Ferrara, where she encounters Ezio again in 1506 while the latter is looking for one of Leonardo da Vinci's paintings in her possession. Lucrezia would spend the next years of her life looking after her children and praying to repent for her sins, until her death in 1519.

=== Juan Borgia the Elder ===
Juan Borgia the Elder (1446 – 1 August 1503) (voiced by Harry Standjofski), also known as "The Banker", is a Templar and a member of the Borgia family, the nephew of Rodrigo Borgia. He was the first of ten cardinal-nephews to be elevated by Rodrigo after the latter became Pope in 1492. As one of Cesare's three generals assigned to keep Rome under the Borgias' rule, Juan is the one who handles Cesare's military funds, providing him with the means to continue his conquests in Italy. He is killed by Ezio during a public orgy he is hosting, thus cutting off Cesare's funds.

=== Octavian de Valois ===
Octavian de Valois (1448 – August 1503) (voiced by Arthur Holden) is a French general, the Baron of Valois, and a member of the Templar Order. A distant cousin of King Louis XII, he was sent in 1498 to front the ranks of the Italian campaign despite his lack of military experience. Within the Templar Order, he is one of Cesare Borgia's top generals, and provides military aid, allowing the Borgias to maintain their grip on Rome. In 1503, his men begin attacking the forces of Bartolomeo d'Alviano on the outskirts of the city, and manage to capture his wife Pantasilea Baglioni, whom Octavian intends to use as leverage to force Bartolomeo to surrender. However, Ezio, Bartolomeo, and his men manage to infiltrate Octavian's barracks after stealing some French uniforms, where Ezio assassinates Octavian and rescues Pantasilea.

=== Micheletto Corella ===
Micheletto Corella (c. 1470 – 1506) (voiced by Tony Calabretta) is a Valencian condottiero, executioner, and a member of the Templar Order, as well as Cesare's personal bodyguard and assassin. In 1503, Ezio nearly assassinates him at the Colosseum in Rome during a play to rescue Pietro Rossi (Lucrezia's lover) and to gain information on Cesare's plans on attacking Romagna, but chooses to spare his life. Following Cesare's arrest, Micheletto helps him escape from prison in 1506, only to later be killed by him.

=== Followers of Romulus ===
The Followers of Romulus (Latin: Secta Luporum) are a pagan cult operating in several abandoned locations underneath Rome. They worship Romulus and believe he was part wolf and part man. The leaders of the cult are hired by the Borgia to influence the Followers into doing their bidding, which often end in "sermons" and evocations of their god. They are mainly used to cause fear amongst civilians before being instructed to focus on the Assassins. From 1500 to 1503, Ezio is able to locate all of the Followers' lairs and eliminate most of theirs members. In the process, he retrieves the six Scrolls of Romulus they were guarding, which hold the keys to the vault where the fabled treasure of Romulus is kept.

=== Iacopo de Grassi ===
Iacopo de Grassi (died 1500) is a high-ranking Borgia guard in Rome and the captain of one of the five Borgia towers that rule over the Centro District. In January 1500 he is killed by Ezio, who throws him into a scaffolding.

=== Il Carnefice ===
Il Carnefice (English: The Executioner) (1473 – January 1500) is an executioner allied to the Borgia who considers himself a twisted artist. He is assassinated by Ezio shortly after his arrival in Rome. His character model is also used for one of the playable characters in the game's multiplayer, "the Executioner".

=== Malfatto ===
Malfatto (died 1502) is a masked doctor allied to the Borgia who preys on people living in Rome's poor districts, primarily courtesans. In 1502, he is assassinated by Ezio while lurking outside the Rosa in Fiore. His character model is also used in the game's multiplayer, under the title of "the Doctor".

=== Silvestro Sabbatini ===
Silvestro Sabbatine (1472–1502) is a slave trader loyal to the Borgia who claims to be a nobleman. After failing Cesare in the past, he had his left arm cut off by Micheletto Corella, forcing him to sport a prosthesic claw. He is killed by Ezio in 1502. Silvestro's character model is also used in the game's multiplayer, under the title of "the Nobleman".

=== Lanz ===
Lanz (1480 – August 1503) is a Roman thief and leader of the Cento Occhi street gang connected to a variety of domestic disturbances. After being caught robbing a Borgia carriage once, he was recruited into the Templars due to his skills, becoming a close ally of Cesare Borgia. He is assassinated by Ezio in 1503. Lanz's character model is also used in the game's multiplayer, under the title of "the Thief".

=== Gaspar de la Croix ===
Gaspar de la Croix (1466 – August 1503) is a weapons engineer and expert marksman hired by Cesare Borgia to create weapons for his army, as well as assassinate various targets for him. He is killed by Ezio in 1503. His character model is also used in the game's multiplayer, under the title of "the Engineer".

=== Donato Mancini ===
Donato Mancini (1473 – August 1503) is a captain of the Papal Army under the direct employ of Cesare Borgia who is skilled at riding horses. After winning a horse race against Cesare once, he was savagely beaten by his mercenaries in retaliation, though he remained loyal to the Borgia. He is killed by Ezio in 1503. His character model is also used in the game's multiplayer, under the title of "the Captain".

=== Auguste Oberlin ===
Auguste Oberlin (1468 – August 1503) is Cesare Borgia's personal blacksmith who creates weapons for his troops and spreads Borgia propaganda throughout Rome. In 1503, after beating his wife during an argument, she helps Ezio lure him out by tearing down his propaganda, allowing the Assassins to kill him. Auguste's character model is also used in the game's multiplayer, under the title of "the Blacksmith".

=== Ristoro ===
Ristoro (1465 – August 1503) is a violent and perverted priest allied with the Borgia. He is assassinated by Ezio in 1503. His character model is also used in the game's multiplayer, under the title of "the Priest".

=== Lia de Russo ===
Lia de Russo (1476 – August 1503) is a smuggler of rare artifacts and a Templar serving under Cesare Borgia. She is killed by Ezio in 1503. Her character model is also used in the game's multiplayer, under the title of "the Smuggler".

=== Nicolaus Copernicus ===
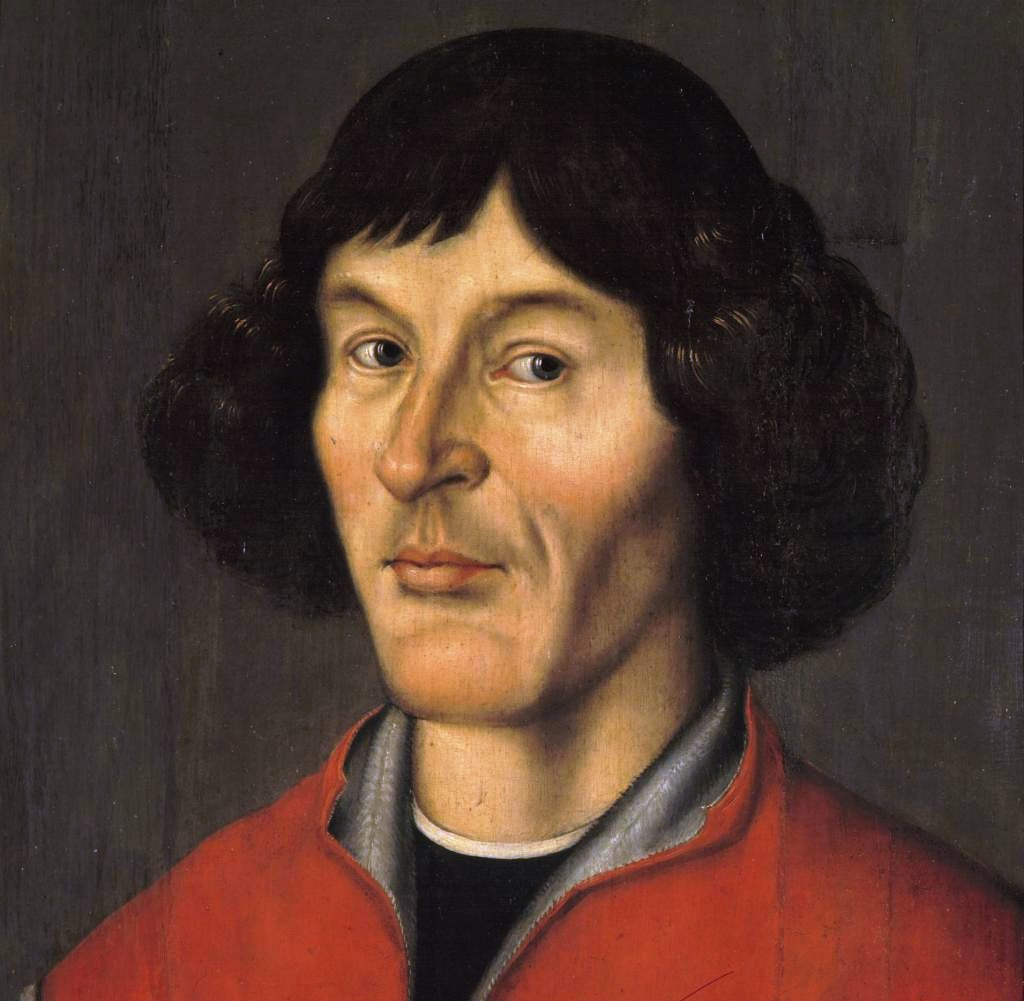
The Torun Portrait of Nicolaus Copernicus (anonymous, c. 1580)

Nicolaus Copernicus (19 February 1473 – 24 May 1543), also known as Niccolò Copernico, was a Renaissance polymath best known for formulating a model of the universe that placed the Sun rather than Earth at its center; he was the first astronomer to do so correctly. In the Copernicus Conspiracy DLC for Assassin's Creed: Brotherhood, Ezio must protect Copernicus from the Templars, who are trying to kill him to prevent him from educating the public with his revolutionary theories.

=== Salaì ===
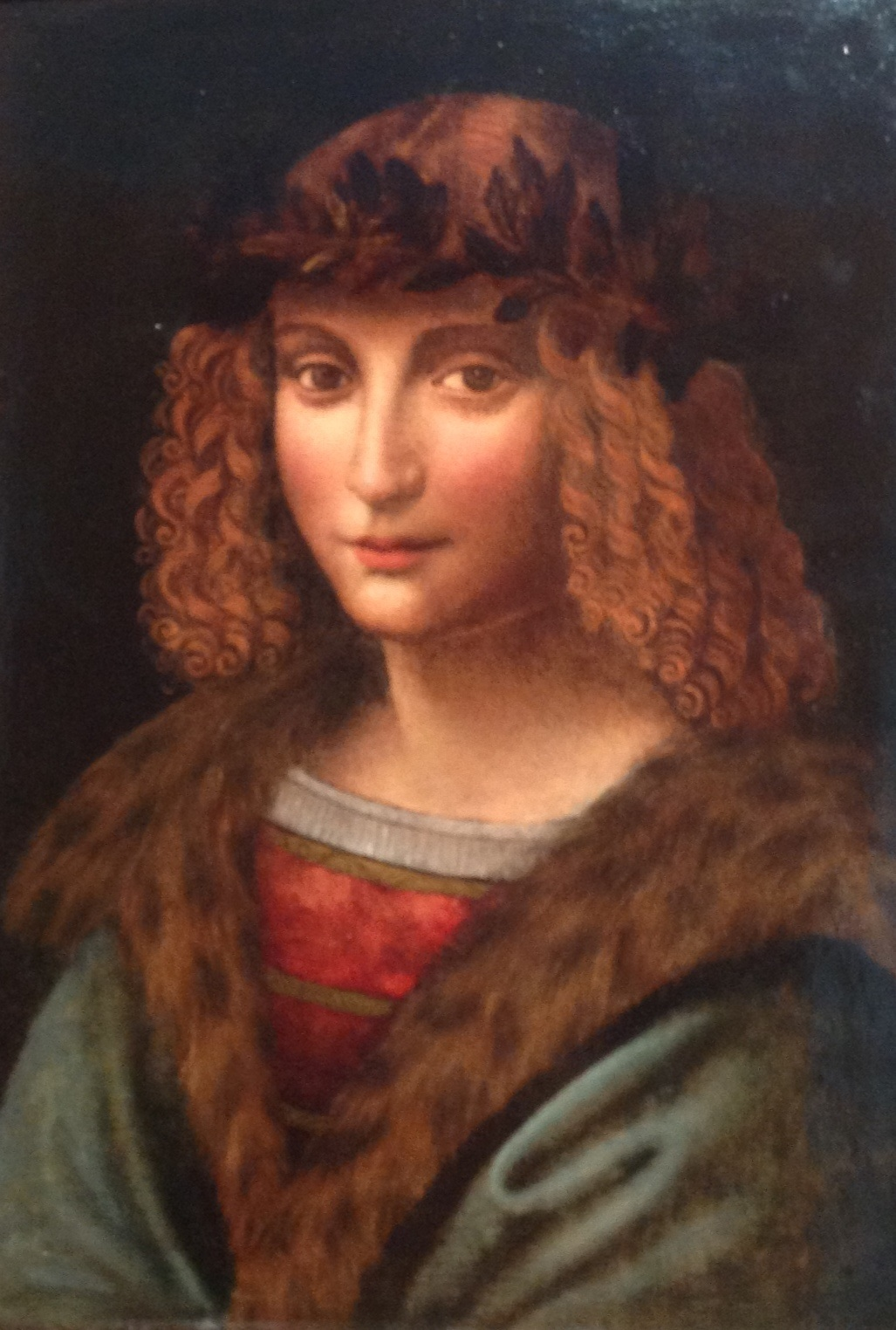
Salai, painting by School of Leonardo da Vinci

Gian Giacomo Caprotti da Oreno (c. 1480 – 19 January 1524) (voiced by David Kaye), commonly known as Salaì, was an Italian artist and pupil of Leonardo da Vinci from 1490 to 1518. He is Leonardo's most famous apprentice, and has also been speculated to have been his lover. In 1506, he helps Ezio investigate Leonardo's disappearance after the latter is kidnapped by the Cult of Hermes.

=== Ercole Massimo ===
Ercole Massimo (1474 – 22 June 1506) is an Italian nobleman and a member of the Massimo family, one of Rome's wealthiest and oldest families. He is also the leader of the covert Cult of Hermes, who follow the teachings of the Isu Hermes Trismegistus and are dedicated to "transforming mankind". In 1506, he and his fellow Hermeticists kidnap Leonardo da Vinci and take him to the catacombs underneath Rome in search for the hidden entrance to the Temple of Pythagoras. When Ezio eventually tracks them down after finding a map leading to the temple hidden on Leonardo's paintings, Ercole tries to convince him to join them, but Ezio refuses and kills Ercole and his men in the ensuing fight.

== Characters of Assassin's Creed: Revelations and Embers ==
=== Yusuf Tazim ===
Yusuf Tazim (c. 1467 – April 1512) (voiced by Chris Parson) is an easy-going Assassin and the leader of the Ottoman Brotherhood of Assassins in the early 16th-century, succeeding the previous Mentor, Ishak Pasha. When Ezio arrives in Constantinople in 1511, Yusuf quickly befriends him and introduces him to the city and the local Assassins' struggle against the Templars. He also provides Ezio with most of the new tools introduced in the game, such as the hookblade and bombs. With Ezio's help, Yusuf establishes good relations with the Ottoman monarchy by befriending Suleiman I and thwarting the Templars' attempts to rebuild the Byzantine Empire. When Ezio has to leave for Cappadocia, he entrusts Yusuf to look after Sofia Sartor in his absence. Sofia's shop is later raided by the Templars, and although Yusuf and the other Assassins try fighting them off, they are ultimately overwhelmed and killed. Ezio discovers Yusuf's body upon his return to Constantinople and uses his death to rally the remaining Assassins to fight the Templars.

Yusuf also appears in a deleted scene of the 2016 Assassin's Creed film, played by Matias Varela (who also plays his descendant, Emir).

=== Sofia Sartor ===
Sofia Sartor (1476 – unknown) (voiced by Anna Tuveri) is a Venetian-Ottoman bookshop owner and literary enthusiast. Although she was born in Constantinople, she was forced to leave for Venice when the Ottoman-Venetian war began in 1499. Sofia returned to her birthplace in 1507 to run a bookstore at the old Polo trading post. In 1511, she meets Ezio and the two grow close as they work together to find the keys to Altaïr Ibn-LaʼAhad's Masyaf library, which were hidden in Constantinople by the Polos. Although Ezio initially tries to conceal the true purpose of these keys, not wanting to get Sofia involved in the Assassin-Templar conflict, he is later forced to rescue her after she is kidnapped by the Templars in an attempt to get Ezio to give away the keys. After leaving Constantinople together, Ezio tells Sofia about the true nature of his "work" on their way to Masyaf to unlock the library. Later in life, the couple get married, settle down in a villa in Tuscany, and have two children: Flavia and Marcello. In 1524, Sofia is with Ezio and Flavia in Florence to buy groceries when the elderly Ezio passes away from a heart attack.

=== Suleiman ===
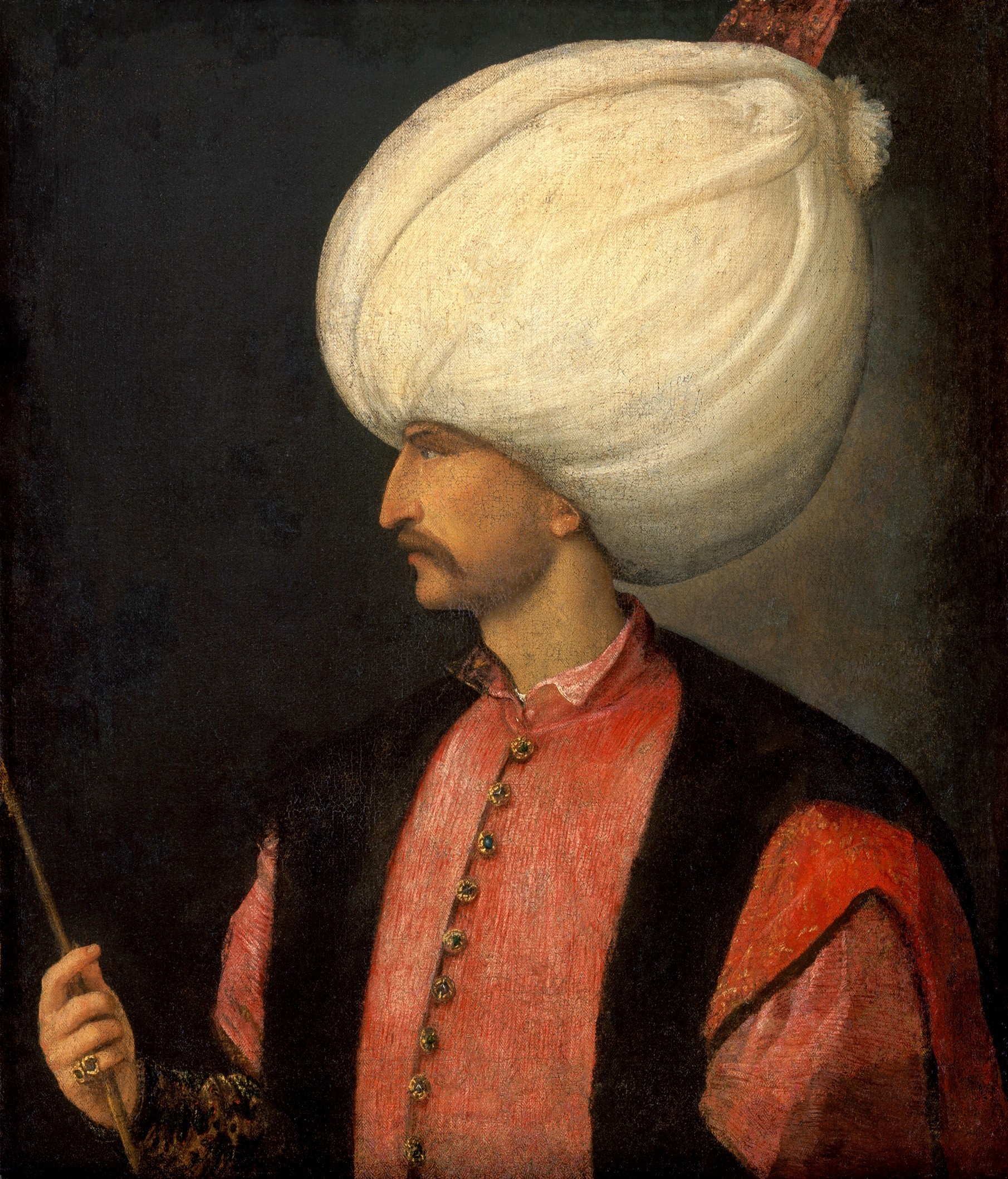
Suleiman in a portrait attributed to Titian c. 1530

Suleiman I (6 November 1494 – 6 September 1566) (voiced by Haaz Sleiman), also known as Suleiman the Magnificent and Suleiman the Lawgiver, was the tenth Sultan of the Ottoman Empire from 1520 until his death, widely regarded as one of the greatest Sultans in history due to his progressive attitude and the prosperity of the Empire during his reign. In the game, a seventeen-year-old Suleiman befriends Ezio shortly after the latter's arrival in Constantinople, and initially avoids telling him of his true identity by posing as a simple student. However, after Ezio saves Suleiman from a kidnapping attempt by the Templars, the latter enlists his help in investigating the feud between his father, Selim I, and uncle, Ahmet, over the claim to the Ottoman throne. This leads Ezio to uncover a Templar plot, headed by Ahmet (whom Suleiman had always supported over Selim), to restore the Byzantine Empire and use Isu artifacts to establish what the Templars view as "peace" by eradicating all differences between men. After discovering his uncle's betrayal, Suleiman, although shocked and not agreeing with the Templars' views, asks Ezio to spare Ahmet's life if he can. Suleiman also speaks with his father and, while unsuccessful in persuading him not to kill Ahmet, manages to convince him to spare Ezio and exile him from Constantinople instead. After succeeding Selim as Sultan years later, Suleiman would prove to be an important ally to the Assassins in their battle against the Templars.

=== Piri Reis ===
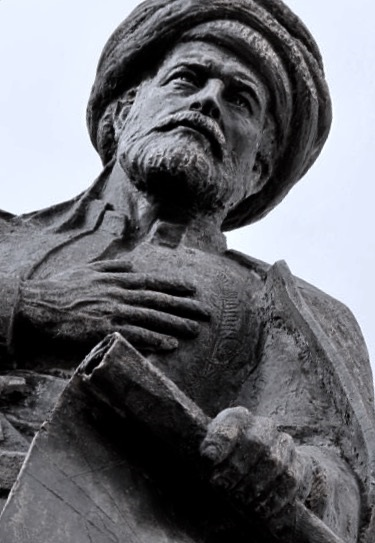
Statue of Piri Reis

Piri Reis (c. 1467 – 1553) (voiced by Alex Ivanovici), born Ahmed Muhiddin Piri, was a famed admiral and cartographer who served in the Ottoman Navy. In the game, he is portrayed as a member of the Assassin Brotherhood, having joined sometime in 1506. Within the Brotherhood, he primarily serves as a technician and intelligence gatherer, providing the Assassins with materials and methods for crafting bombs from his small studio in the Grand Bazaar. He is also a trusted friend of Yusuf Tazim, and later befriends Ezio.

=== Tarik Barleti ===
Tarik Barleti (1470 – 1511) (voiced by JB Blanc) is the captain of the Janissaries, the personal guard of the Ottoman Empire. Prince Suleiman believes Tarik to be a Templar because of his behavior and his sale of weapons to Manuel Palaiologos, a known Templar, despite Tarik's friendship with Suleiman's father, Selim I, in the past. Suleiman decides to act on his theory and asks Ezio to kill Tarik. In his final moments, Tarik reveals that he feigned his betrayal to get close to the Templars and discover their hideout in Cappadocia, which he planned to attack. He makes a final request to Ezio to stop the Templars, which the latter honors. Tarik is one of the few assassination targets in the series that is unaffiliated with the Templars or Assassins.

=== Dilara ===
Dilara (voiced by Nadia Verrucci) is an Ottoman spy sent by Tarik Barleti to infiltrate the Byzantine Templars' hideout in Cappadocia, to observe their movements and make preparations for when Tarik and his men would attack them. However, the attack does not occur, due to Ezio killing Tarik, and the spies accompanying Dilara are eventually discovered and captured. When Ezio arrives in Cappadocia in 1512, he attempts to make amends for his assassination of Tarik by carrying out his original plan and meets with Dilara. The two then work together to rescue the captured spies and eliminate the Templar presence in Cappadocia.

=== Ishak Pasha ===
Ishak Pasha was an Ottoman general, statesman, and Grand Vizier, as well as the Mentor of the Ottoman Brotherhood of Assassins until his death. His most notable feat came in 1476, when he killed the Wallachian Templar Vlad Țepeș during a Hungarian uprising. Although historical records describe Pasha as dying in 1487, the mobile game Assassin's Creed Rebellion shows him still being active in 1495. After his death, Pasha was succeeded as Mentor by his apprentice, Yusuf Tazim, and left behind ten memoir pages that led to his Assassin armor, which he had hidden inside the Hagia Sophia. The memoir pages and Pasha's armor would later be retrieved by Ezio in 1511.

=== Bayezid II ===
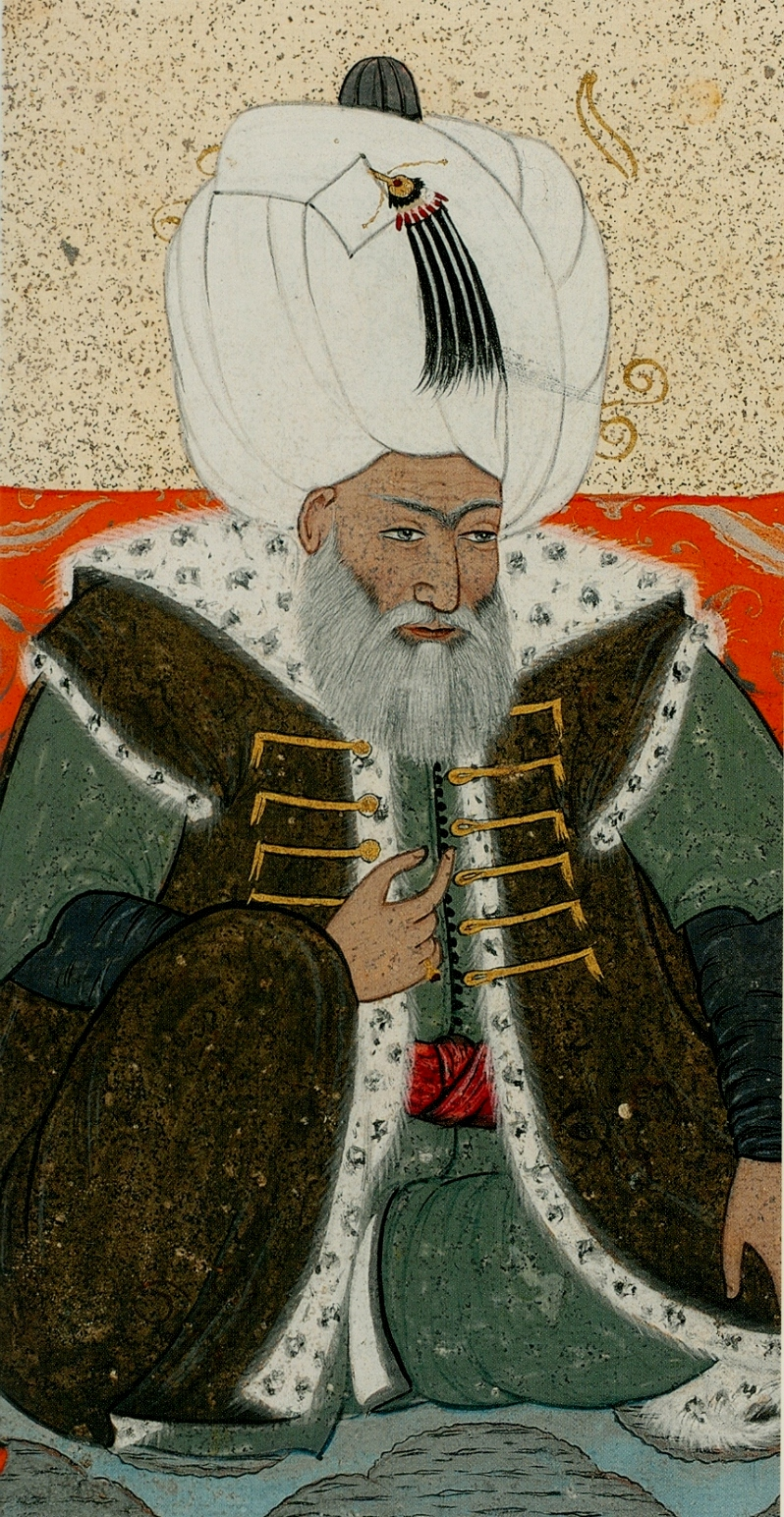
18th-century portrait of Bayezid II

Bayezid II (3 December 1447 – 26 May 1512) was the eighth Sultan of the Ottoman Empire from 1481 to 1512. During his reign, he consolidated the Empire, and welcomed many escaped Jewish refugees seeking to escape the Spanish Inquisition. Despite choosing his eldest son Ahmet as his heir, he was forced to abdicate the Ottoman throne to his youngest son, Selim I, in April 1512, and died one month later. While Bayezid does not physically appear in Assassin's Creed: Revelations, he is frequently mentioned.

=== Selim I ===
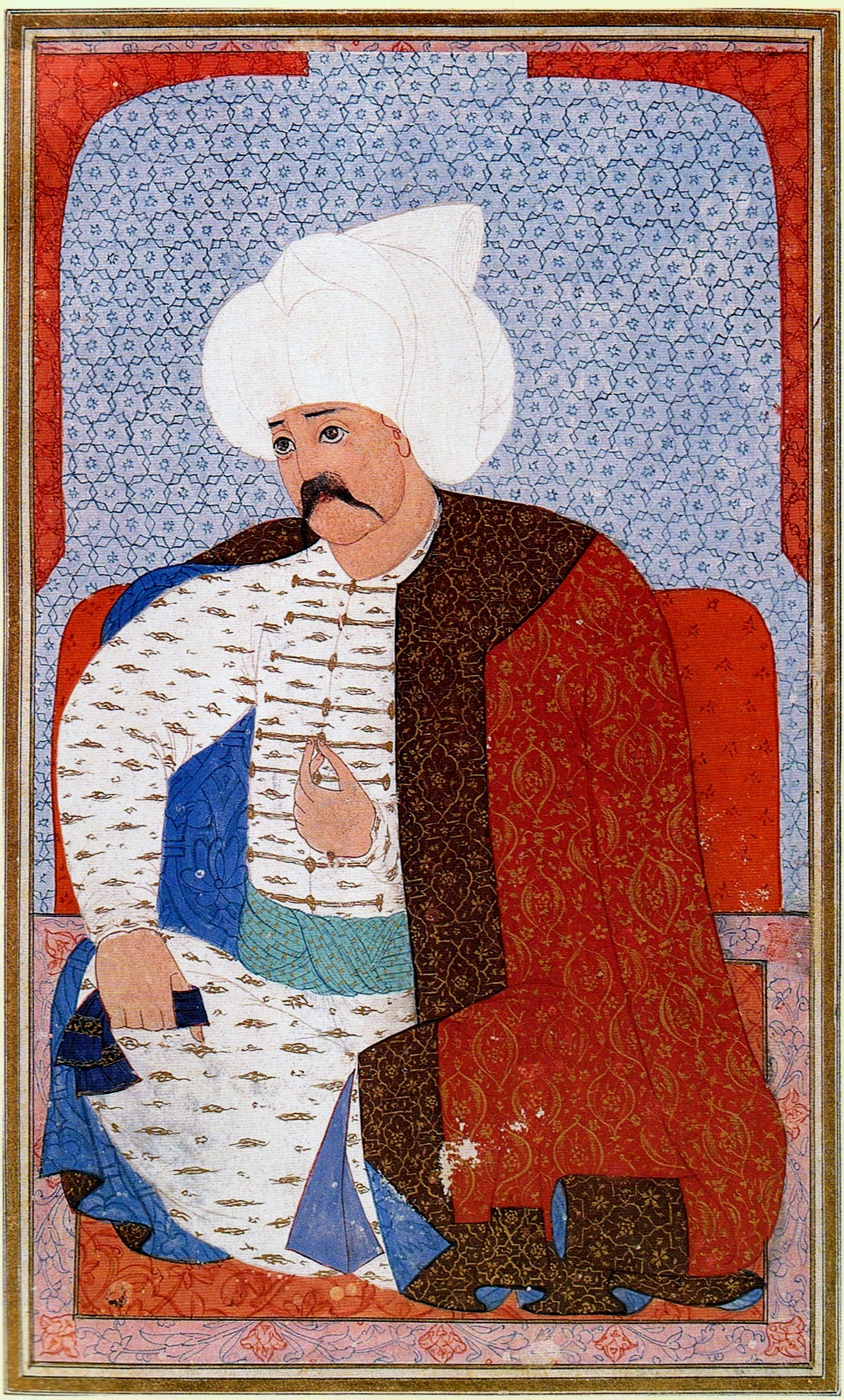
Portrait of Selim I by Nakkaş Osman

Selim I (10 October 1470 – 22 September 1520) (voiced by Mark Ivanir), also known as Selim the Grim or Selim the Resolute, was the youngest son of Bayezid II who succeeded him as Sultan of the Ottoman Empire, reigning from 1512 until his death in 1520. His rule was marked by the enormous expansion of the Empire, in particular the conquest of the Levant, Hejaz, Tihamah, and Egypt, which became known together as the Mamluk Sultanate. He was succeeded by his only living son, Suleiman. Although most of Assassin's Creed: Revelations takes place during Selim's fight with his brother Ahmet over the claim to the Ottoman throne, Selim himself has only a few references throughout the main story and appears briefly at the end, when he confronts Ahmet and Ezio shortly after forcing Bayezid to abdicate. Proclaiming his new authority as Sultan, Selim murders Ahmet, but spares Ezio due to Suleiman's endorsement, instead ordering him to leave Constantinople and never return.

=== Ahmet ===
Ahmet (c. 1465 – 25 April 1512) (voiced by Tamer Hassan) is the main antagonist of Assassin's Creed: Revelations. He is an Ottoman Şehzade (prince), the eldest living son of Bayezid II, the older brother of Selim I, and Suleiman's uncle. Between him and Selim, Bayezid favored Ahmet as an heir due to his calm and calculated demeanor. This enraged Selim, who wanted the Ottoman throne for himself and began fighting his brother in 1509. Around the same time, Ahmet secretly joined the Templar Order, who promised him the power to end all feuds that divided men, and eventually became the Grand Master of the Byzantine Rite. Although Ahmet himself was Ottoman, he nonetheless helped the Templars infiltrate Constantinople to further their plans of re-establishing the Byzantine Empire. He also started an expedition to find the keys to Altaïr Ibn-LaʼAhad's library, believing it contained the location of the Isu's Grand Temple and would thus further the Templar cause. In 1511, Ahmet sets up an unsuccessful ambush to capture Suleiman, intending to have him rescued and appear as a brave hero. The plan is foiled by Ezio, who then investigates the Byzantine Templars at Suleiman's request, leading him to uncover Ahmet's betrayal. After learning Ezio has found all the library keys, Ahmet has his love interest, Sofia Sartor, kidnapped, to ransom her for the keys. After obtaining the keys, Ahmet tries to flee Constantinople, but is defeated by Ezio, just as Selim's army arrives. Proclaiming his authority as the new Sultan, Selim then executes Ahmet by strangling him and tossing him off a cliff.

=== Manuel Palaiologos ===
Manuel Palaiologos (1454 – March 1512) (voiced by Vlasta Vrána) is the secondary antagonist of Assassin's Creed: Revelations. He is the heir to the lost Byzantine Empire throne and nephew to Constantine XI, as well as the second-in-command of the Byzantine Rite of the Templar Order. Posing as a wealthy Ottoman citizen, he conspires to take back Constantinople with the help of the Ottoman Prince Ahmet, and leads the search for the keys to Altaïr Ibn-LaʼAhad's library, which the Templars believe could further their cause. In 1512, he is assassinated by Ezio in the Byzantine-controlled city of Cappadocia.

=== Shahkulu ===
Shahkulu (died March 1512) (voiced by Alex Ivanovici), also spelled Şahkulu, is the leader of the Şahkulu rebellion (which takes its name from him), a widespread pro-Shia and pro-Safavid uprising in Anatolia, directed against the Ottoman Empire. Born into a Turkmen tribe in eastern Anatolia, Shahkulu grew up witnessing his people being oppressed by the Ottomans. After an Ottoman ambush on his tribe left him orphaned and alone, Shahkulu, seeking revenge and a sense of belonging, joined the Byzantine Rite of the Templar Order. By 1511, he had become well known for his ruthlessness, especially towards Ottomans, and was in a partnership with Manuel Palaiologos, believing that if he helped him restore the Byzantine Empire, he would be generously rewarded. Although Shahkulu historically died in battle in July 1511, in the game he is shown surviving until 1512, when he is found in Cappadocia, violently beating Ottoman spies to death in a chapel. After surviving Ezio's initial assassination attempt, he is slain in the ensuing fight.

=== Leandros ===
Leandros (died March 1511) (voiced by Steve Blum) is the captain of a Templar regiment stationed in Masyaf that is attempting to open the library of Altaïr Ibn-LaʼAhad. After his men capture Ezio when he first arrives in Masyaf, Leandros tries to hang him, but the Assassin escapes and eventually kills Leandros, taking from him the journal of Niccolò Polo.

=== Cyril of Rhodes ===
Cyril of Rhodes (died 1511) is a former priest for the Eastern Orthodox Church and a member of the Byzantine Rite of the Templar Order. In 1511, he makes plans to assassinate Pachomius I, the Patriarch of Constantinople, who expelled and humiliated him in the past, but is killed by Ezio and one of his Assassin recruits before he has the chance to. Cyril of Rhodes' character model is also used in the game's multiplayer, under the title of "the Deacon".

=== Damat Ali Pasha ===
Damat Ali Pasha (died 1511) is a member of the Byzantine Rite of the Templar Order, who used to serve Bayezid II, until the Sultan's conquering ambition declined. In 1511, Ezio and one of his Assassin recruits help Ali catch a thief who robbed him. Later, Ali unknowingly puts a bounty on the same Assassin apprentice that helped him, leading to the recruit hunting him down with Ezio's help. Ali's character model is also used in the game's multiplayer, under the title of "the Vizier".

=== Georgios Kostas ===
Georgios Kostas (died 1511) is a member of the Byzantine Rite of the Templar Order with a reputation for incredible strength and brutality. Born in Greece, he left his birthplace in search for global recognition and became the champion of numerous fighting tournaments held in Thrace, catching the Templars' attention, who eventually inducted him into the Order. In 1511, Georgios is ordered to assassinate a printer in Constantinople, but is foiled by Ezio and one of his Assassin recruits, who later kill Georgios when he is targeting the printer's father. Georgios's character model is also used in the game's multiplayer, under the title of "the Champion".

=== Lysistrata ===
Lysistrata (died 1511) is a wealthy actress from Constantinople and a member of the Byzantine Rite of the Templar Order. Using her charms, she lures away and murders Ottoman officials to benefit the Templar cause. In 1511, she is assassinated by Ezio and one of his Assassin recruits during a public performance. Lysistrata's character model is also used in the game's multiplayer, under the title of "the Thespian".

=== Mirela Djuric ===
Mirela Djuric (died 1511) is a Romani thief and fortune teller and a member of the Byzantine Rite of the Templar Order. She manages the Templars' criminal network in Constantinople, and uses various tricks to swindle the poor out of their money. In 1511, she is tracked down by Ezio and one of his Assassin recruits with the help of other Romani, but she manages to escape. Later, she is finally killed while collecting ingredients for a poison. Mirela's character model is also used in the game's multiplayer, under the title of "the Trickster".

=== Odai Dunqas ===
Odai Dunqas (died 1511) is a cousin of the first ruler of the Funj Sultanate and a member of the Byzantine Rite of the Templar Order. In 1511, he begins bribing merchants in the Assassin-controlled districts of Constantinople to raise their prices, so that the public's opinion would turn against the Assassins. He is eventually killed by Ezio and one of his Assassin recruits. Odai's character model is also used in the game's multiplayer, under the title of "the Guardian".

=== Vali cel Tradat ===
Vali cel Tradat (died 1511) is a Wallachian noble and former Assassin, who joined the Byzantine Rite of the Templar Order after the Brotherhood made a truce with the Ottoman Empire. Because the Ottomans had conquered Wallachia, oppressed Vali's people, and killed his secret idol, Vlad Țepeș, Vali saw this as an act of betrayal and sought revenge against both the Assassins and the Ottomans—which the Templars promised to him. In 1511, while killing Assassins in Constantinople on the Templars' behalf, Vali is hunted down and finally slain by Ezio and one of his Assassin recruits. Vali's character model is also used in the game's multiplayer, under the title of "the Sentinel".

=== Vlad Țepeș ===
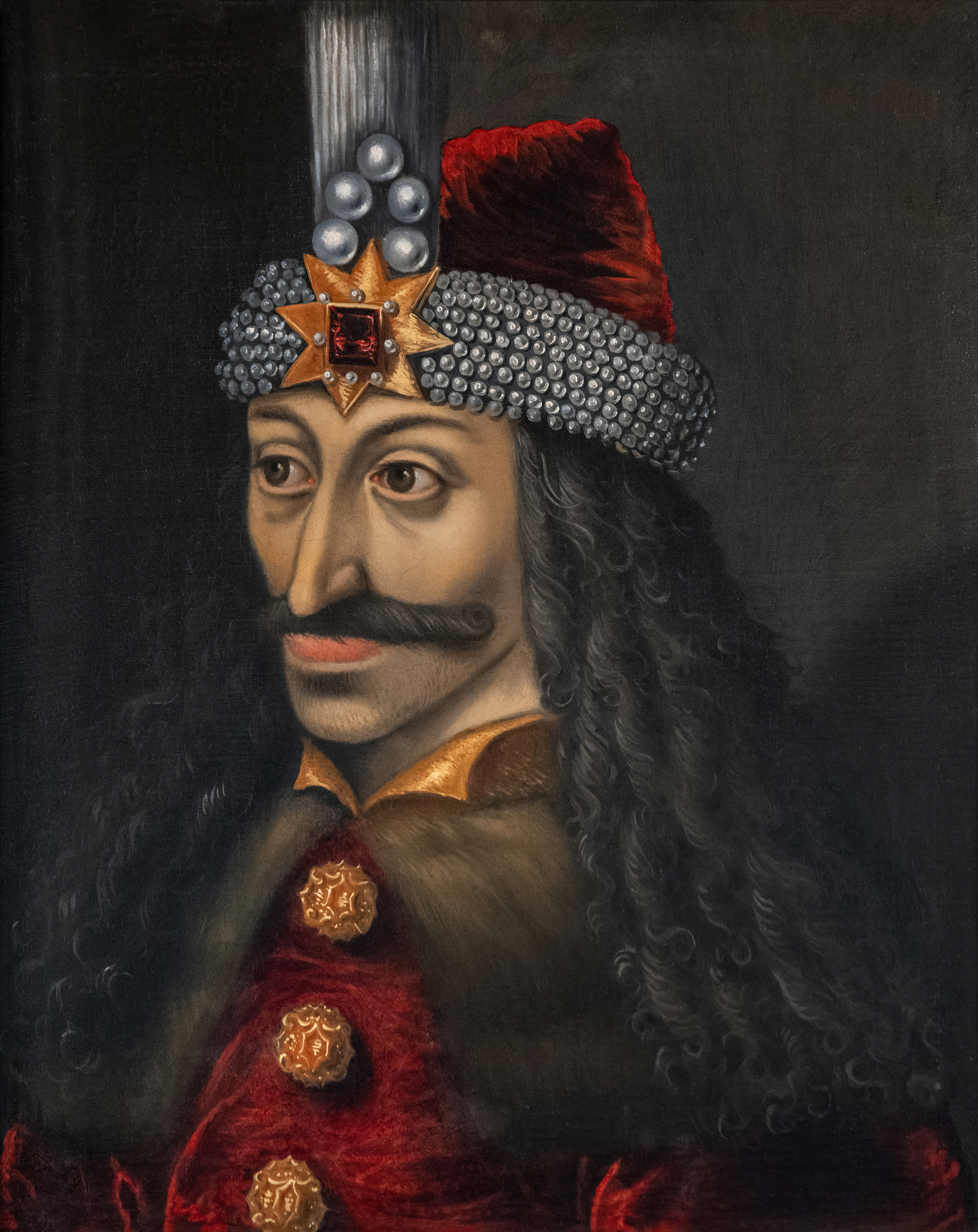
Portrait of Vlad III Țepeș (c. 1560)

Vlad III Țepeș (1431 – 1476), commonly known as Vlad the Impaler or Vlad Dracula, was Voivode of Wallachia three times between 1448 and his death in 1476, and secretly a member of the Templar Order. He was known for his ruthlessness towards his enemies, especially the Ottomans, whom he executed for the smallest of crimes, typically by impalement—hence his nickname. In 1476, he was killed by Ishak Pasha, the Mentor of the Ottoman Assassins, during a Hungarian uprising, and his severed head and sword were later brought to Constantinople as a trophy, where they were buried in a specially made prison. In 1511, Vlad's tomb is explored by Ezio, who retrieves his sword. While Vlad does not physically appear in Assassin's Creed: Revelations, he is mentioned several times, and his character model is used in the game's multiplayer, under the title of "the Count".

=== Abbas Sofian ===
Abbas Sofian (1166 – 1247) (voiced by Nolan North in Assassin's Creed and by Yerman Gur in Assassin's Creed: Revelations) is a Syrian Assassin during the Middle Ages, who serves as Mentor from 1227, when he usurps the position from Altaïr, until his death in 1247. Raised as an Assassin from birth alongside Altaïr, the two became best friends during their childhood. However, their relationship became strained after Altaïr revealed to Abbas that his father, Ahmad Sofian, had killed himself to escape the shame of being indirectly responsible for the death of Altaïr's own father, Umar. Abbas, who had grown up believing his father had left the Brotherhood, branded Altaïr a liar, and developed a lifelong hatred for him. After Altaïr kills their Mentor, Al Mualim, in 1191, Abbas stands against Altaïr, who wants to become the Brotherhood's new leader. He eventually repents and keeps a low profile during Altaïr's time as Mentor. When Altaïr and his family leave for Mongolia to deal with the threat presented by Genghis Khan, Abbas stages a secret coup d'état against Altaïr; killing his younger son, Sef Ibn-La'Ahad, and framing Altaïr's best friend and right-hand man, Malik Al-Sayf, who is thrown in prison and later executed as well. With Sef and Malik out of the way, Abbas holds the most power over the Brotherhood, and he implements a council with himself as its head. Eventually, he disbands the council, usurping the title of Mentor, and becomes the sole leader of the Levantine Assassins. Under Abbas' leadership, the Order declines and becomes corrupt. Additionally, Abbas spends most of his time hiding in Masyaf's fortress, fearing for his life. After Altaïr returns from his exile, the Assassins, disillusioned with Abbas' rule, join him again and help him get to Abbas, who is killed by Altaïr's newest invention: the Hidden Gun.

=== Darim Ibn-La'Ahad ===
Darim Ibn-La'Ahad (1195 – unknown) (voiced by Michael Benyaer) is a Syrian Assassin during the Middle Ages, and the eldest son of Altaïr Ibn-LaʼAhad and Maria Thorpe. When he is in his early twenties, he journeys to Mongolia with his parents to assassinate Genghis Khan due to the threat he poses to the Assassin Order. Successful, they return to Masyaf in 1228, only to find that Abbas Sofian had usurped leadership of the Assassins and killed Darim's brother Sef. After Maria is also killed, Darim and Altaïr are forced to flee Masyaf. The two later have a falling out due to Altaïr's depression and obsession with the Apple of Eden, and Darim leaves him to support Sef's widow and children. In 1247, Altaïr returns alone and kills Abbas, reclaiming the title of Mentor. Darim returns soon after and stays in Masyaf until it is attacked by the Mongols in 1257. After repelling the attack, Altaïr, knowing the Mongols will return, decides to seal himself in the library he had built. Before that, he bids farewell to Darim, telling him to go and live his life. Darim then leaves for Alexandria to rejoin his sister-in-law and nieces.

=== Sef Ibn-La'Ahad ===
Sef Ibn-La'Ahad (1197 – c. 1226) is a Syrian Assassin during the Middle Ages, and the youngest son of Altaïr and Maria. When his parents and older brother go to Mongolia to assassinate Genghis Khan, Sef stays in Masyaf to help Altaïr's friend Malik Al-Sayf lead the Assassin Order in their absence. However, two years before their return, Abbas Sofian decides to usurp leadership of the Assassins, and has his henchman Swami murder Sef in his sleep. He is an ancestor of Desmond Miles.

=== Niccolò and Maffeo Polo ===
Niccolò (c. 1230 – c. 1294) (voiced by Shawn Baichoo) and Maffeo Polo (c. 1230 – c. 1309) were Venetian traveling merchants who were the father and uncle, respectively, of famed explorer Marco Polo. During their lifetimes, they established trading posts in Constantinople, Sudak, and the western part of the Mongol Empire. In the game, they are both portrayed as members of the Assassin Order, having been inducted by Altaïr in 1257, shortly before his death. Before their departure from Masyaf, Altaïr entrusts the Polo brothers with his Codex and five of the keys to his underground library, instructing them to conceal the keys and spread the Assassins' teachings. The brothers would later hide the keys in Constantinople, and establish Assassin guilds in several of the places they visited, thus ensuring the survival of the Assassin Order after the fall of Masyaf to the Mongols.

=== Haras ===
Haras (died 1189) (voiced by Michael Benyaer) is a Syrian Assassin during the Middle Ages who, disillusioned with the Assassin cause, betrays them and helps the Templars attack Masyaf in 1189. Altaïr leads the other Assassins in fending off the attack, and rescues Al Mualim, who had been taken captive during the battle, killing Haras in the process. Haras's character model is also used in the game's multiplayer, under the title of "the Crusader".

=== Flavia Auditore ===
Flavia Auditore (May 1513 – unknown) (voiced by Angela Galuppo) is the daughter of Ezio and Sofia Sartor, and an ancestor of Desmond Miles. She appears in the animated short Assassin's Creed: Embers.

=== Marcello Auditore ===
Marcello Auditore (October 1514 – unknown) is Ezio and Sofia's son and Flavia's younger brother.

== Characters of Assassin's Creed III ==
=== Connor ===
Ratonhnhaké:ton (4 April 1756 – unknown) (voiced by Noah Watts), better known as Connor, is the protagonist of Assassin's Creed III. He also makes a minor appearance in Assassin's Creed III: Liberation. He is an Anglo-Kanienʼkehá꞉ka Assassin who struggles to protect the Haudenosaunee as he fights alongside the Patriots during the American Revolutionary War. He initially develops a strong working relationship with George Washington, though this falls apart after Connor discovers that Washington was behind an attack on his village in his youth, which resulted in his mother's death and set him on the path to become an Assassin. After the Revolutionary War, he focuses on rebuilding the Colonial Brotherhood of Assassins, which had been all but eradicated by the Templars decades prior, and becomes its Mentor. He also marries a woman from a nearby tribe and has three children; the youngest of whom, Io꞉nhiòte, possesses the rare ability of Eagle Vision. Connor is the son of Kaniehtí꞉io and Haytham Kenway, the grandson of Edward Kenway, and an ancestor of Desmond Miles through the paternal line.

=== Haytham Kenway ===
Haytham Kenway
- Assassin's Creed character
- First game: Assassin's Creed III (2012)
- Created by: Ubisoft Montreal
- Portrayed by: Adrian Hough

In-universe information
- Family: Edward Kenway (father); Tessa Kenway (mother); Jennifer Scott (half-sister)
- Significant other: Kaniehtí:io (lover)
- Children: Ratonhnhaké꞉ton / Connor (son)
- Relatives: Bernard Kenway (grandfather); Linette Kenway (grandmother); Io:nhiòte (granddaughter); Unnamed granddaughter Unnamed grandson William Miles (descendant); Desmond Miles (descendant); Elijah (descendant); Victor Flores Castillo (descendant); Noa Kim (descendant)
- Origin: London, England, Great Britain
- Nationality: English

Haytham E. Kenway (4 December 1725 – 16 September 1781) (voiced by Adrian Hough) is introduced as the false protagonist of Assassin's Creed III (2012), in which players control him for the game's initial chapters, before being revealed as the true antagonist. Haytham also serves as a supporting character in Assassin's Creed Rogue (2014), which takes place between his playable chapters in Assassin's Creed III and the latter part of the game, and his backstory is further explored in the novel Assassin's Creed: Forsaken. Haytham was born in 1725 as the son of Edward Kenway, one of the leading members of the British Brotherhood of Assassins and the protagonist of the prequel game Assassin's Creed IV: Black Flag (2013). Following his father's murder in 1735, he is manipulated into joining the Templar Order, the Assassins' arch-enemies, and eventually becomes one of the Order's leading members as the Grand Master of the North American colonial rite. Under Haytham's leadership, the Templars exterminate most of the Colonial Assassins, becoming the dominant force on the continent, and later attempt to build a new nation under their rule by influencing the American Revolution. During this time, Haytham sires a son, Ratonhnaké:ton / Connor, with a Native American woman, who in turn joins the Assassins and undoes most of his father's work. Though Haytham and Connor briefly become allies and consider unifying their orders, they both ultimately realise that peace between the Assassins and Templars is impossible, and their conflict culminates with Haytham's death at Connor's hands in 1781.

=== Achilles Davenport ===
Achilles Davenport (c. 1710 – September 1781) (voiced by Roger Aaron Brown) is a major supporting character in Assassin's Creed III, and the main antagonist of Assassin's Creed Rogue. He is a Master Assassin who serves as Mentor of the Colonial Brotherhood from 1746 until his retirement in 1763. Trained by Ah Tabai, the Mentor of the West Indies Brotherhood, Achilles travels to the American Colonies in 1740 to establish his own branch of the Brotherhood, which he develops over the following years by recruiting additional members. By 1752, due to the lack of a strong Templar presence in North America at the time, Achilles and his Brotherhood have started to focus on finding Pieces of Eden before the Templars can. Around the same time, Achilles' wife Abigail and son Connor die of typhoid fever, greatly affecting the Mentor, who becomes more distant and reckless with his actions as a result. In 1755, after his apprentice's, Shay Cormac, attempt to retrieve a Piece of Eden results in Lisbon's destruction, Achilles refuses to listen to Shay's pleas to stop the search for the Pieces, resulting in the latter betraying the Brotherhood and eventually joining the Templar Order. With Shay's help, the Templars purge the Colonial Brotherhood over the following years, though Achilles himself is spared by the Templar Grand Master, Haytham Kenway, at Shay's request, so that he could warn the other Assassins of the Pieces' destructive capabilities after witnessing them first hand. After being crippled by Haytham, Achilles retires to his homestead, becoming a hermit, until he meets Ratonhnhaké:ton in 1769, who is eager to become an Assassin. Though reluctant at first, he trains Ratonhnhaké:ton in the Assassins' ways, and renames him Connor, after his own late son, to help him blend in with colonial society. Achilles and Connor frequently argue during the latter's quest to eliminate the Colonial Templars, as Connor hopes to make peace with them since they share a common goal. Despite this, the two develop a genuine father-son bond, and Connor even helps Achilles find new purpose in life by bringing in new people to his homestead, turning it into a small community. Achilles eventually passes away of old age in 1781, and his death is mourned by Connor and all the homesteaders.

=== Kaniehtí꞉io ===
Kaniehtí꞉io (1731 – 2 November 1760) (voiced by Kaniehtiio Horn), also known as Ziio, is a Kanien'keha:ka (Mohawk) clan woman and warrior, and the mother of Ratonhnhaké꞉ton / Connor. Unlike her fellow villagers, who prefer to stay neutral to protect their sacred sanctuary, she fights settlers encroaching on her people's lands. In 1754, she becomes allies with Haytham Kenway, who seeks access to the sanctuary. The two share a brief relationship, which results in Connor's birth. However, Ziio is left to raise their son alone, as Haytham abandons her after she accuses him of simply using her to achieve his goal. When her son is four, Ziio dies in an attack on their village ordered by George Washington; Connor grows up believing Haytham's subordinate Charles Lee is responsible, which sets him on the path to join the Assassins.

=== Kanenʼtó꞉kon ===
Kanenʼtó꞉kon (1756 – 17 June 1778) (voiced by Akwiratékha Martin) is a member of the Kanien'kehá:ka nation in the Mohawk Valley and a close childhood friend of Connor. Although he initially advocates for the Kanien'kehá:ka to remain neutral in the American Revolutionary War, he and several other of his village's warriors believe that they can protect their people by siding with the British. He is manipulated by Charles Lee into believing that Connor had joined George Washington in a campaign against the Mohawk people, prompting him to attack his former friend when he tries to intervene in a Mohawk ambush on colonial soldiers. Pinned to the ground and vulnerable to a lethal blow, Connor is forced to stab Kanenʼtó꞉kon in the neck with his Hidden Blade, killing him.

=== Oiá꞉ner ===
Oiá꞉ner is the Clan Mother of the Kanien'kehá:ka village of Kanatahséton. She and the other Kanien'kehá:ka in the village serve as protectors of the sacred ground on which both their village and the Grand Temple stood. Oiá꞉ner is also the keeper of the tribe's "Crystal Ball", a Piece of Eden which allows anyone to communicate with the Isu Juno. In 1769, Oiá꞉ner shows the Crystal Ball to Connor when he returns from a hunt and allows him to interact with it. Through the Crystal Ball, Juno informs Connor of his destiny as an Assassin and urges him to leave the village and seek out Achilles Davenport. Many years later, Oiá꞉ner meets an adult Connor and tells him of the whereabouts of Kanenʼtó꞉kon and other Kanien'kehá:ka men, who are attempting to attack Continental soldiers. Sometime after Kanenʼtó꞉kon's death, Oiá꞉ner speaks with Connor, and reveals that she plans to move their people west, far from the American Revolutionary War, like many of the other nations. After his unpleasant reaction, she tells him that she would do what was best for her people, and Connor leaves the village. On his return some years later, he finds the village deserted except for an old hunter, who tells him that his people have already left.

=== Robert Faulkner ===
Robert Faulkner (1715 – unknown) (voiced by Kevin McNally) is an elderly sailor and Assassin who serves as Connor's first mate aboard the Aquila. He has a reputation for having a disciplined crew, avoiding trouble, and predicting the weather accurately. Although he is the fourth generation in his family to become a sailor, he is the first to be recruited into the Assassin Brotherhood. Faulkner started off in the Royal Navy, but after finding that his career is stalling (partly due to his inability to purchase commissions), he went to work for the United Company of Merchants. In 1753, Faulkner disappears from the historical record, presumed dead—because it was around this time that he joined the Assassins as first mate of the Aquila. When the Aquila is nearly destroyed in 1768, Faulkner retires to a shack near Achilles Davenport's homestead, trying to drink his sorrows away. He finds new purpose in life when he meets Connor a few years later, who repairs the Aquila and becomes its captain.

=== George Washington ===
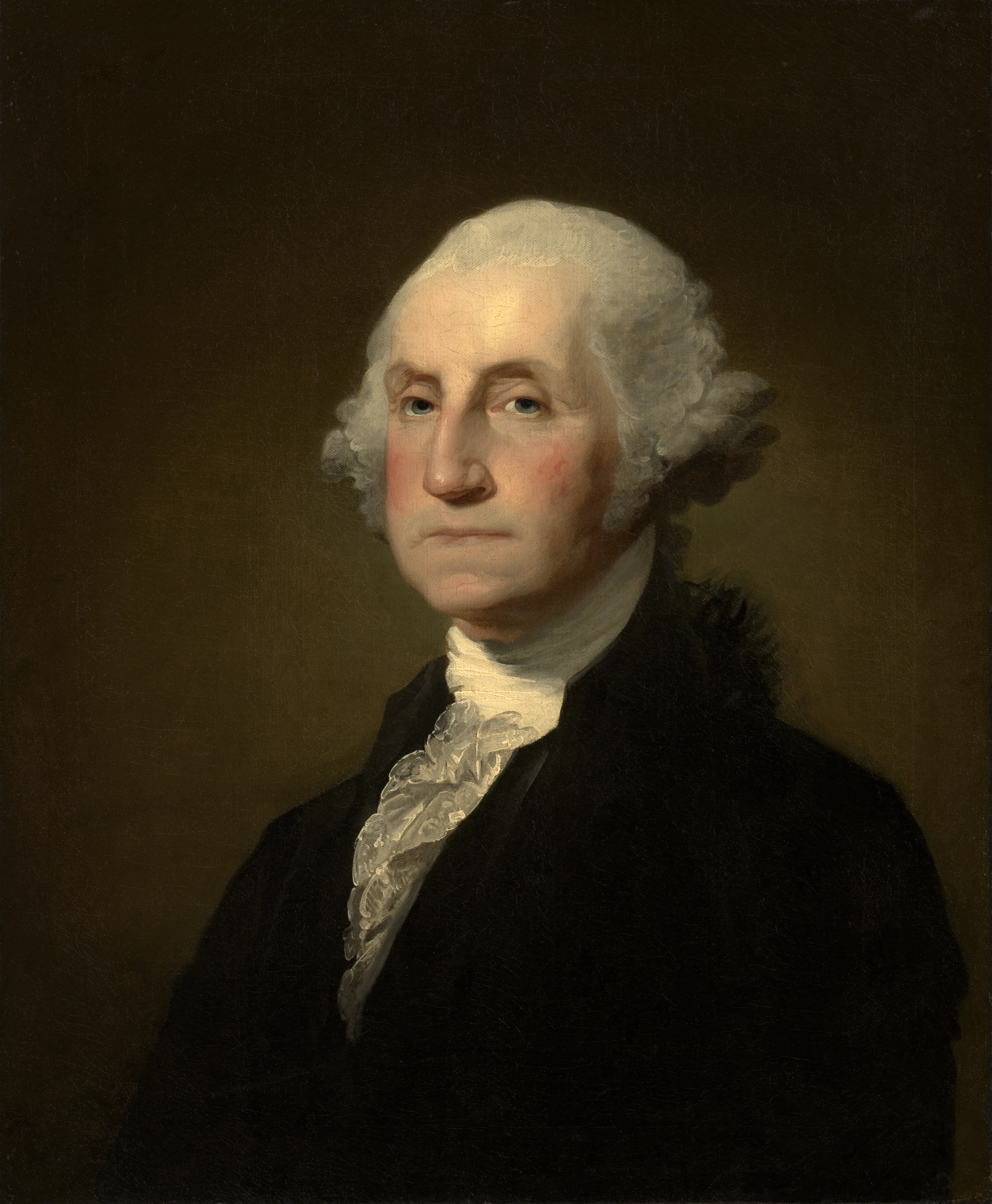
Portrait of George Washington by Gilbert Stuart

George Washington (22 February 1732 – 14 December 1799) (voiced by Robin Atkin Downes in Assassin's Creed III and by Tod Fennell in Assassin's Creed Rogue) was the Commander-in-Chief of the Continental Army during the American Revolutionary War from 1775 to 1783, and later served as the first President of the United States from 30 April 1789 to 4 March 1797. Prior to the Revolutionary War, Washington also fought in the Seven Years' War and led several attacks against neutral or enemy Native tribes, including the neutral village of Kanatahséton in 1760. During the Revolutionary War, Washington is targeted by the Templars, in particular his own subordinate and political rival Charles Lee, who is angered that he had been passed over for the position of Commander-in-Chief, leading Connor to inform Washington of the existence of both the Assassins and the Templars in order to protect him. Although the Continental Army initially suffers many losses under Washington's command, Connor and his Assassin apprentices help win the army several small victories. Over time, Washington develops a strong working relationship with Connor, thought this falls apart after the latter discovers Washington was behind the Kanatahséton attack, which killed his mother, and now plans a second attack after Lee manipulated Connor's people into siding with the Loyalists. Nevertheless, Connor remains loyal to the Patriot cause, and thanks to his efforts, the Continental Army ultimately emerges victorious in 1783. After the war, Washington seeks Connor's help in disposing of an Apple of Eden he had seized, which has been giving him nightmares of an alternate timeline where Washington ruled over the United States as a tyrant. Thanks to these visions, as well as Connor's words of advice, Washington would become inspired to be a just leader for the American people when he was later elected president.

=== Samuel Adams ===
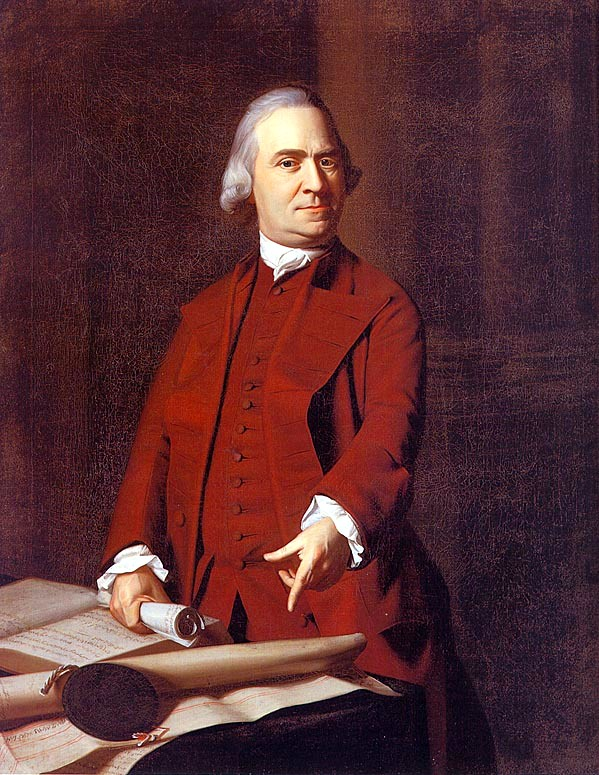
Portrait of Samuel Adams by John Singleton Copley

Samuel Adams (27 September 1722 – 2 October 1803) (voiced by Mark Lindsay Chapman) was an American statesman, political philosopher, a Sons of Liberty Patriot and one of the Founding Fathers of the United States. During the American Revolution, Adams meets and becomes a trusted associate of Connor, after Achilles Davenport tells him to find Adams on his first trip to Boston. Connor would subsequently aid Adams and the Sons of Liberty several times throughout the Revolution, most notably during the Boston Tea Party in 1773.

=== Benjamin Franklin ===
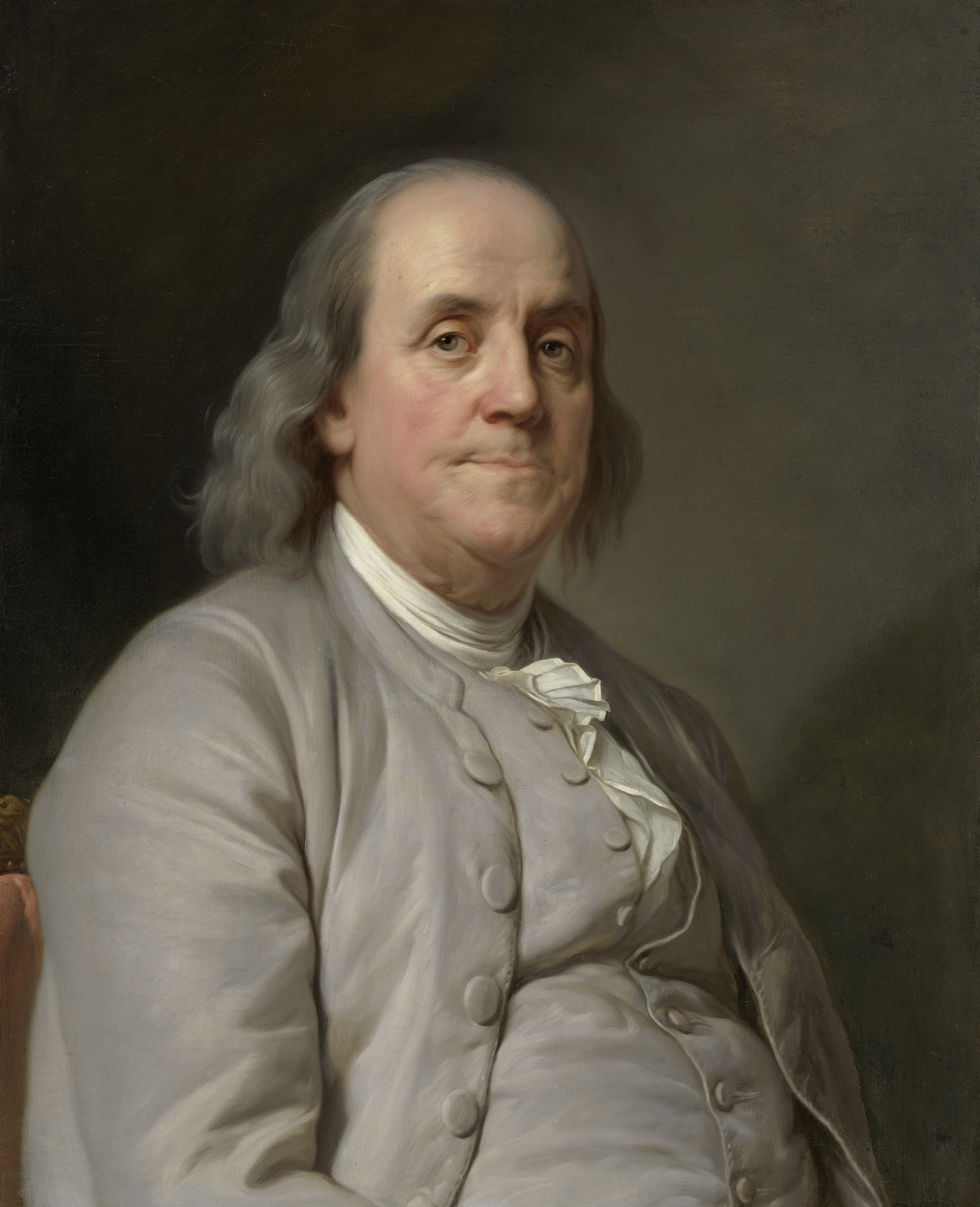
Portrait of Benjamin Franklin by Joseph Duplessis, 1778

Benjamin Franklin (17 January 1706 – 17 April 1790) (voiced by Jim Ward in Assassin's Creed III and by Rick Jones in Assassin's Creed Rogue) was a freemason, a noted polymath, and one of the Founding Fathers of the United States. Franklin is first encountered by Haytham Kenway in Boston in 1754, when he requests the latter's help in finding the stolen pages of his Poor Richard's Almanack. Around the same time, Franklin was being unknowingly used by the Templars to study the Precursor box they had seized, which was given to him by William Johnson. However, the Assassins Shay Cormac and Hope Jensen are able to hijack the research by posing as associates of Johnson's. They help Franklin with his experiments on the box, generating a map which shows the locations of various Precursor sites. By 1756, the Assassins have commissioned Franklin to develop various weapons for them, including a prototype grenade launcher, though this would later be given to Shay, who visits Franklin at his lab in New York after his defection to the Templars. During the American Revolutionary War, Franklin is appointed the first United States Ambassador to France and moves to Paris, where he unexpectedly encounters Shay again in 1776. After Shay saves him from a gang of street criminals, Franklin helps him infiltrate the Palace of Versailles for a supposed "business meeting" (in reality, Shay came to retrieve the Precursor box from the Assassins, who were having a secret meeting there). Despite his many interactions with various Assassins and Templars throughout his life, Franklin doesn't appear to be aware of the existence of either of the two orders.

=== Paul Revere ===
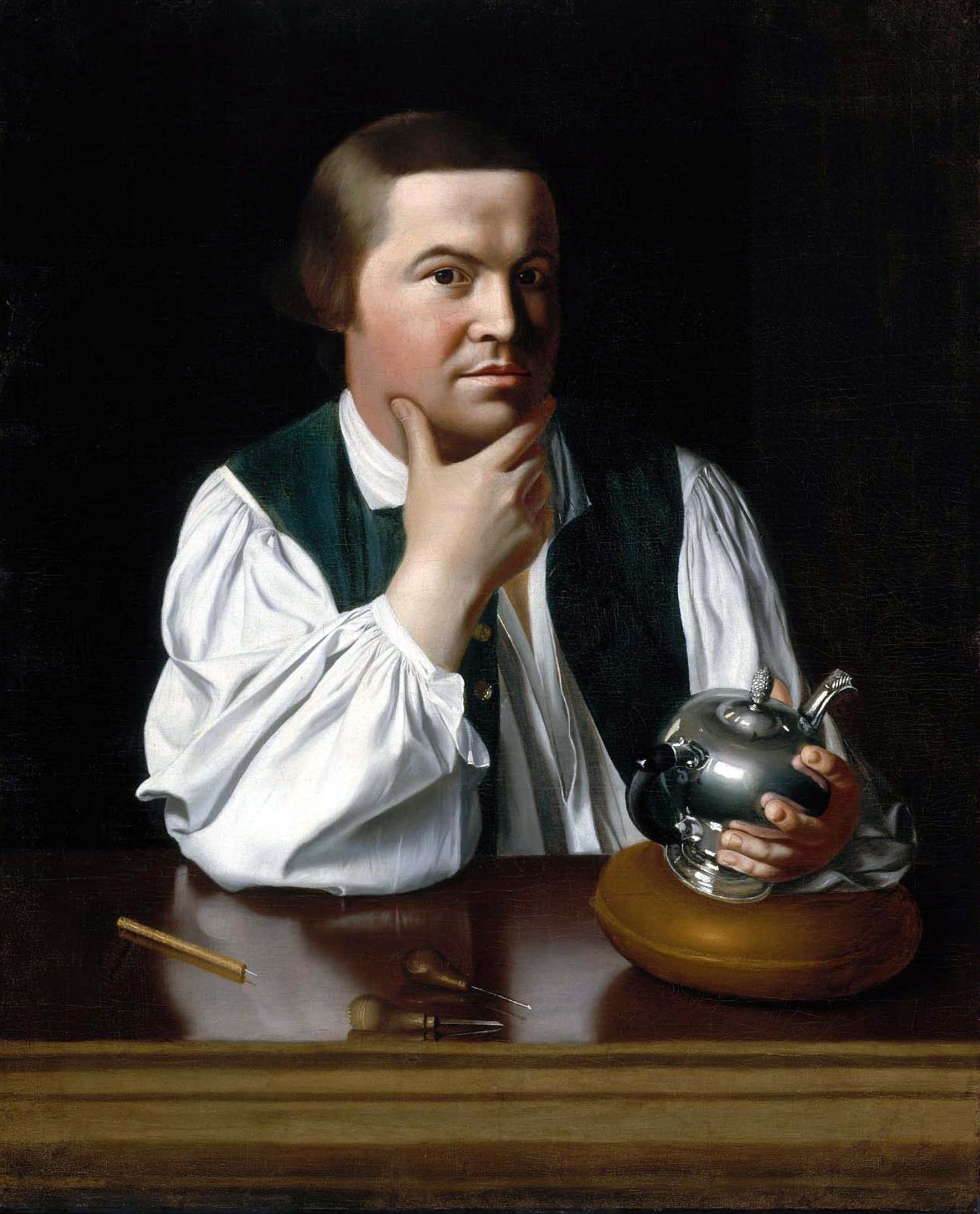
Portrait of Paul Revere by John Singleton Copley, c. 1768–1770

Paul Revere (1 January 1735 – 10 May 1818) (voiced by Bruce Dinsmore) was an American silversmith, engraver, early industrialist, and a Son of Liberty Patriot. He is best remembered for his 1775 midnight ride to alert the colonial militia to the approach of British forces before the Battles of Lexington and Concord, which marked the start of the American Revolutionary War. In the game, he is accompanied by Connor during this ride, after being previously introduced to the Assassin by Samuel Adams. Thanks to Revere and Connor's efforts, the Patriots are able to organize a defense in time and ultimately win the two battles.

=== Israel Putnam ===
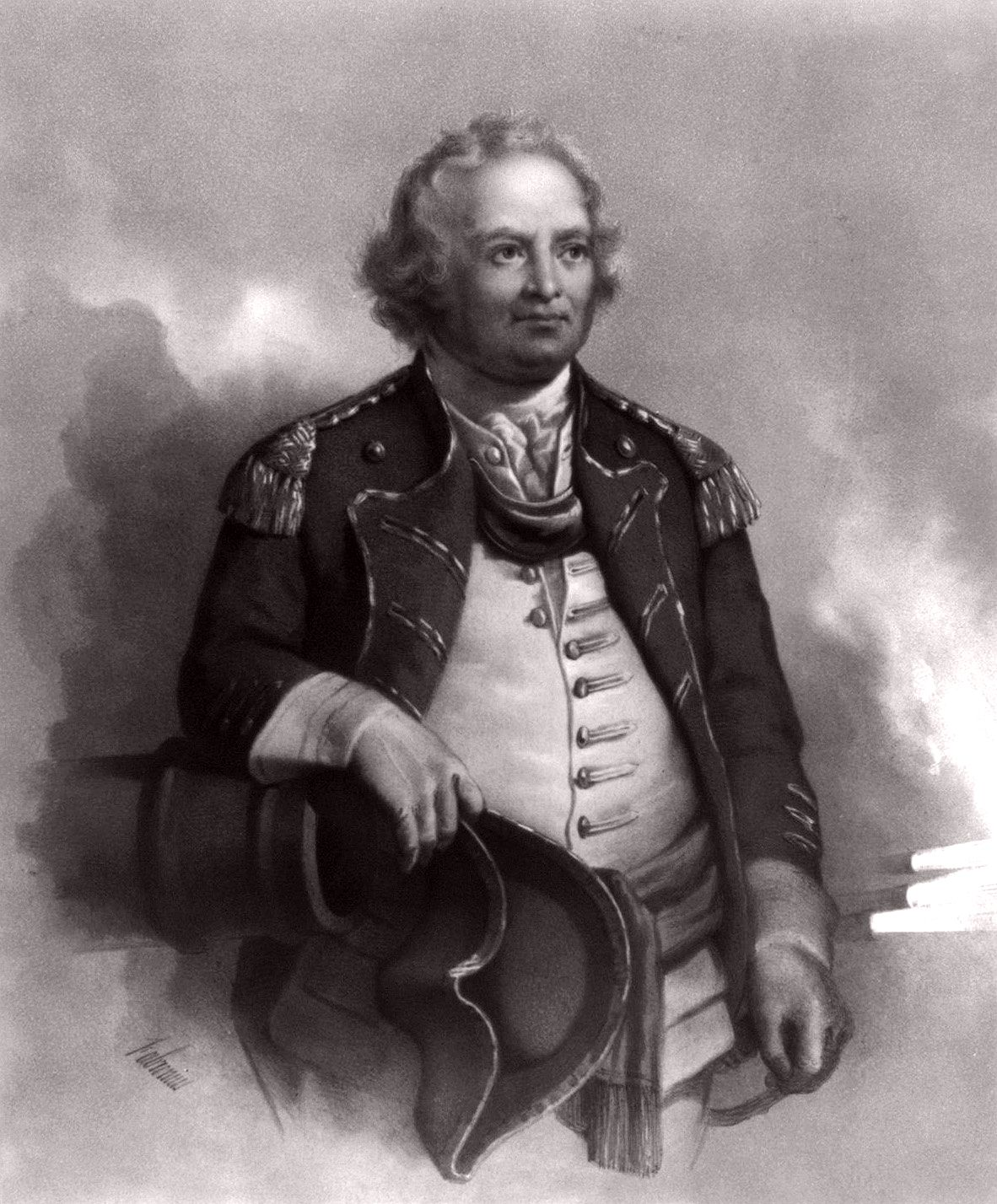
Major General Israel Putnam

Israel Putnam (7 January 1718 – 29 May 1790) (voiced by Andreas Apergis) was an American military officer and Patriot commander during the American Revolutionary War. He is best remembered for fighting with distinction at the Battle of Bunker Hill in 1775 at the start of the war. In the game, he is shown being assisted by Connor during the battle, whom Putnam initially distrusts, but later comes to respect after the Assassin proves himself by killing the British commander and Templar John Pitcairn. Although both sides suffer heavy casualties, Pitcairn ultimately deems the battle a lost cause and orders his troops to retreat, allowing the British to capture Charlestown. The following year, after Connor thwarts an assassination attempt on George Washington that he was originally framed for, Putnam comes to his defense and praises him, calling Connor a hero.

=== Benjamin Tallmadge ===
Benjamin Tallmadge (25 February 1754 – 7 March 1831) was an officer of the Continental Army during the American Revolutionary War, as well as a spymaster who organized the Culper Ring spy circle alongside George Washington during the British occupation of New York. He would later become a politician after the war, being elected to the United States House of Representatives in 1801. In the game, he is also a close friend of Achilles Davenport, as Tallmadge's father was an Assassin, although Tallmadge opted not to follow in his footsteps and join the Brotherhood due to hoping to lead a normal life someday and not enjoying the idea of "living in two worlds." In 1776, after learning Connor had uncovered a plot to kill Washington, Tallmadge enlists his help in stopping the assassin, the Templar Thomas Hickey, although both Connor and Hickey would end up arrested by the Patriots and jailed after an altercation in New York. Tallmadge tries to use his position in the government to secure Connor's release and ensure Hickey remains imprisoned by accusing him of the assassination plot, but his efforts are thwarted by the Templars, who manage to get Hickey pardoned and frame Connor for the plot. Nevertheless, Connor would ultimately escape his execution and kill Hickey before he could carry out Washington's assassination.

=== Mason Weems ===
Mason Locke Weems (11 October 1759 – 23 April 1825) (voiced by Tod Fennell) was an American minister, evangelical bookseller, and author best known for writing the first biography of George Washington immediately after his death. Weems held Washington in very high esteem and much of his work praised Washington and highlighted his feats, although many of them were greatly exaggerated. In the game, Weems is encountered by Connor in Bridewell Prison in 1776, where he tries to help the latter escape after learning that Washington's life is in danger and that Connor is trying to save him.

=== Marquis de Lafayette ===
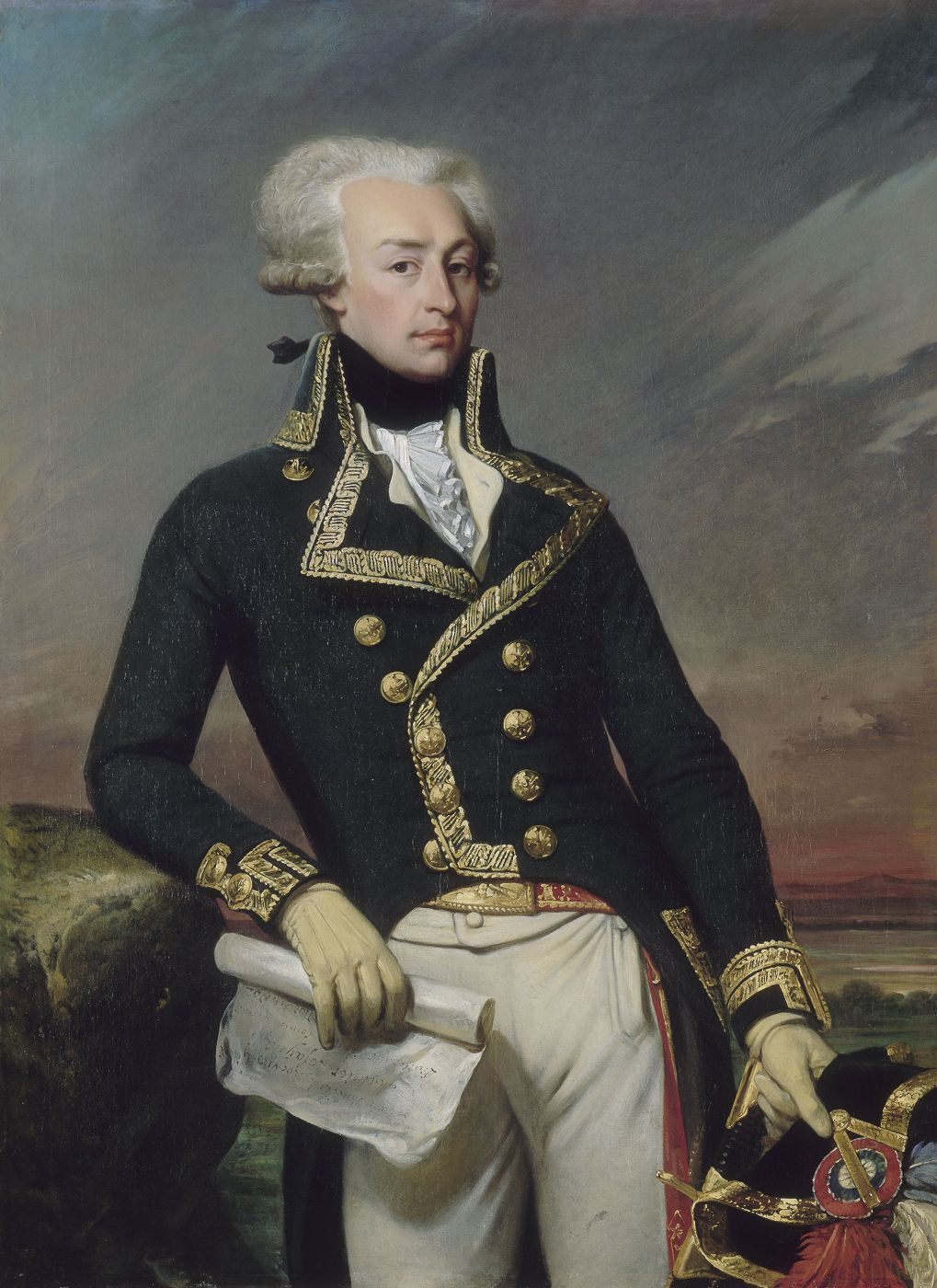
Portrait of Lafayette as a Lieutenant General in 1791, by Joseph-Désiré Court

Marie-Joseph Paul Yves Roch Gilbert du Motier, Marquis de La Fayette (6 September 1757 – 20 May 1834) (voiced by Vince Corazza), commonly known as Lafayette, was a French aristocrat, freemason and military officer who fought in the American Revolutionary War, commanding Patriot troops in several battles. He would later serve as a key figure in both the French Revolution of 1789 and the July Revolution of 1830, and is considered a national hero in both France and the United States. In the game, Lafayette works alongside Connor several times during the Revolutionary War, most notably during the Battle of Monmouth in 1778, resulting in Lafayette becoming one of Connor's most trusted associates. As such, the Assassin would later enlist Lafayette's help in planning his infiltration of Fort George in 1781 in order to assassinate Charles Lee.

=== Benedict Arnold ===
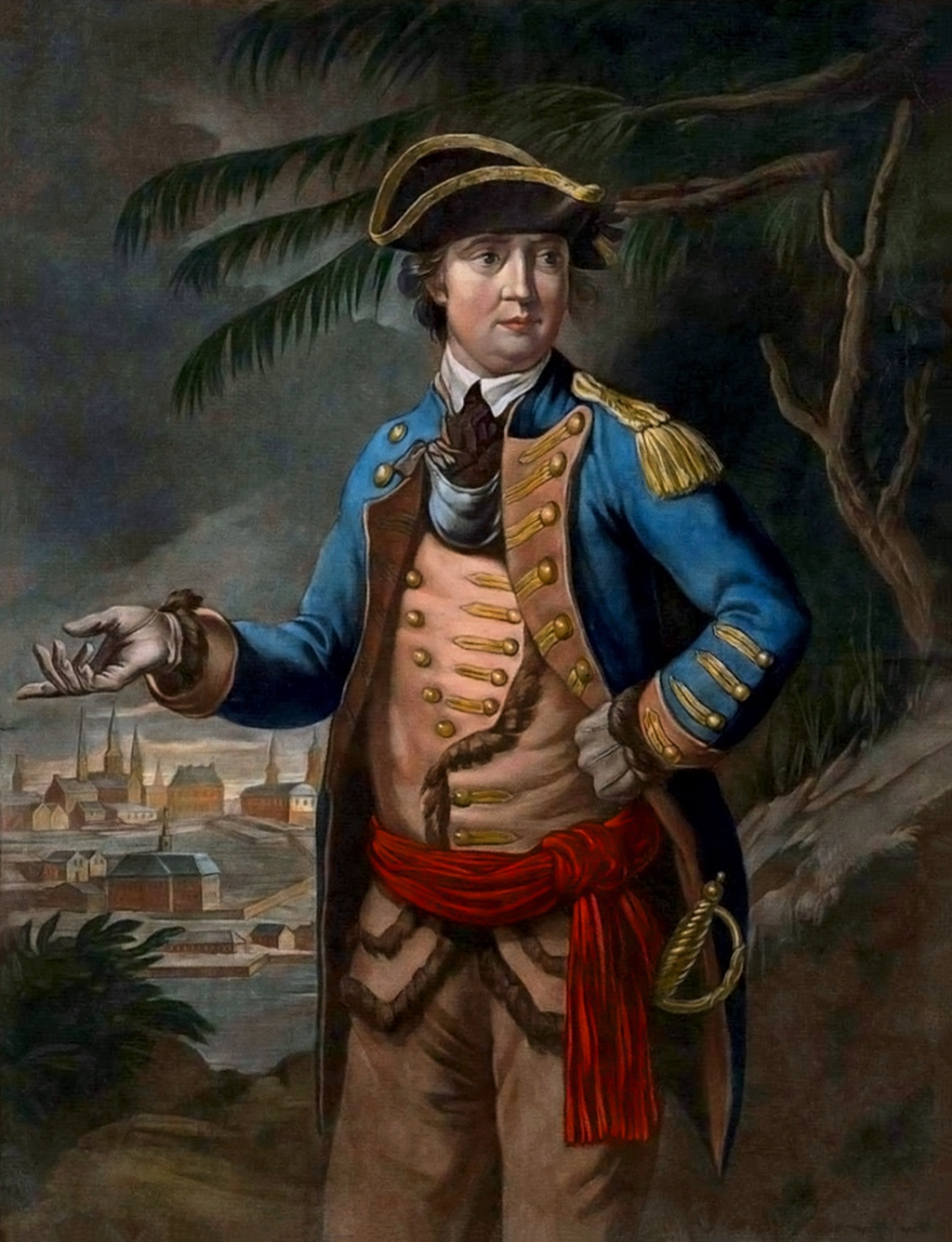
Portrait of Benedict Arnold by Thomas Hart, 1776

Benedict Arnold (14 January 1741 – 14 June 1801) (voiced by Graham Cuthbertson) was an American-born military officer who served as Major General in the Continental Army during the American Revolutionary War. Although initially regarded as a war hero, he had a propensity for arguing with his superiors, meaning he would often be passed over for promotions. As such, after being given command of West Point in 1780 by George Washington, Arnold secretly betrayed the Patriots and planned to surrender the fort to the British. In the game, Washington becomes distrustful of Arnold and asks Connor to investigate rumors of his betrayal, which the latter discovers to be true upon intercepting a letter discussing Arnold's plan. He then confronts Arnold but is distracted by the British's attack of West Point, and Arnold is able to escape by boat while Connor helps the Patriot soldiers defend the fort. For the rest of the war, Arnold would serve as a brigadier general in the British Army and lead British troops against his former allies, but his name has since become synonymous with treason and betrayal in the United States.

=== François-Joseph Paul de Grasse ===
François-Joseph Paul de Grasse (13 September 1722 – 11 January 1788) was a French Navy admiral best known for his command of the French fleet at the Battle of the Chesapeake in 1781 in the last year of the American Revolutionary War. In the game, Connor aids de Grasse during the battle using the Aquila in exchange for the admiral's help with his infiltration of Fort George in order to assassinate Charles Lee. After the French's victory, de Grasse upholds his end of the deal and has the French fleet open fire on the fort, creating a distraction that allows Connor to infiltrate it undetected.

=== Thomas Jefferson ===
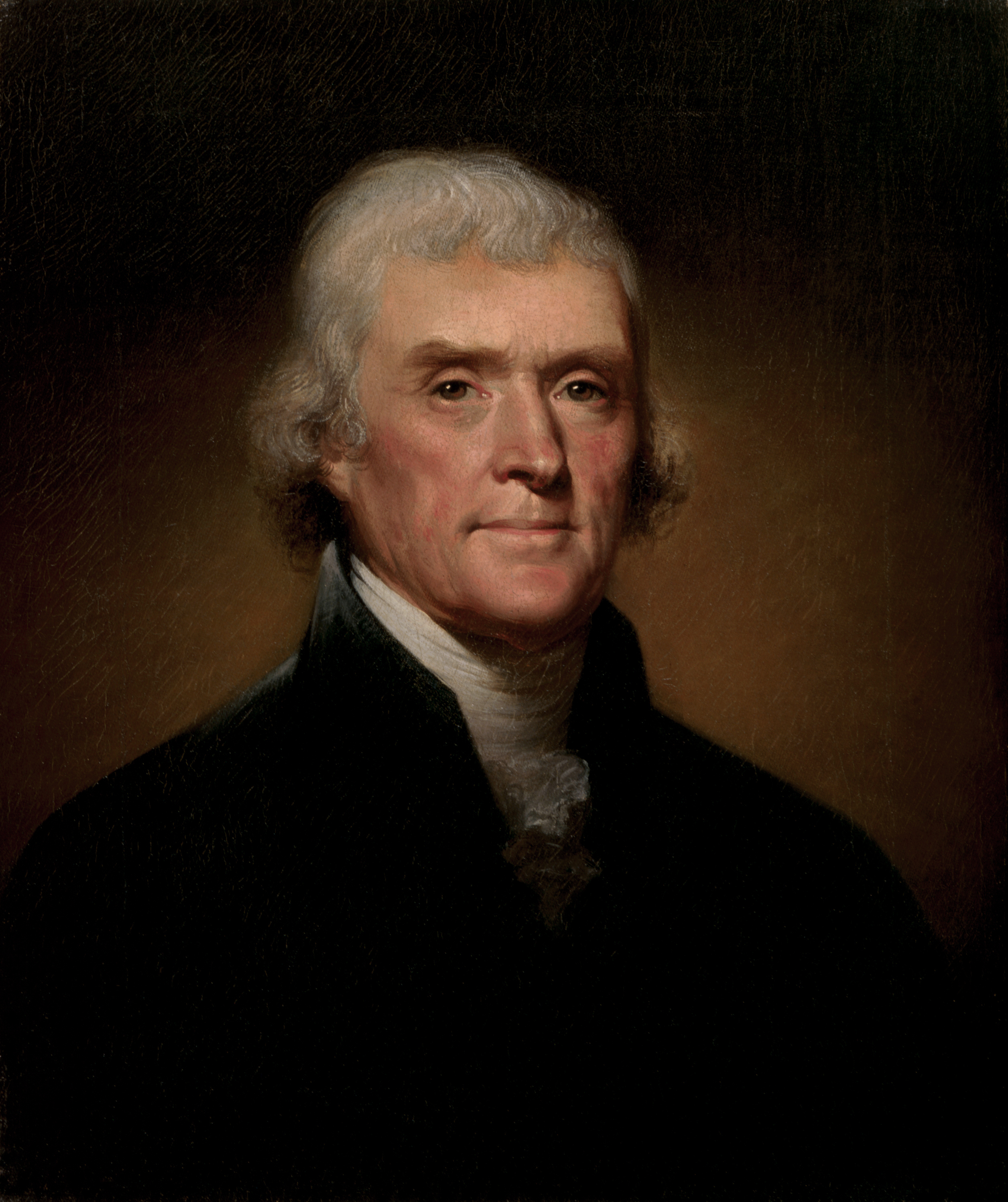
Official Presidential portrait of Thomas Jefferson by Rembrandt Peale, 1800

Thomas Jefferson (13 April 1743 – 4 July 1826) (voiced by John Emmet Tracy) was one of the Founding Fathers of the United States and the principal author of the Declaration of Independence who later served as the third President of the United States from 4 March 1801 to 4 March 1809. While only mentioned in the base game, he plays a more prominent role in The Tyranny of King Washington expansion, where he is the leader of a rebellion against George Washington's regime in New York in an alternate timeline.

=== Amanda Bailey ===
Amanda Bailey (1730 – unknown) (voiced by Dawn Ford) is an innkeeper living in Martha's Vineyard and a former love interest of Robert Faulkner. During the American Revolutionary War, she secretly works as a spy for the Continental Army and is reunited with Faulkner when the latter and Connor come to Martha's Vineyard to acquire crew members and cannons for the Aquila. She later helps Connor and Faulkner in their hunt for the Continental Navy captain and Templar Nicholas Biddle, telling them about rumors of Biddle's ship, the USS Randolph, being seen raiding ships along the East Coast.

=== Assassin recruits ===
During the game, Connor encounters several individuals that he recruits to the Assassin Brotherhood after assisting them. These people are subsequently trained as Assassins and can come to Connor's aid or be sent to perform individual missions throughout the Thirteen Colonies.

- Stephane Chapeau (1743 – unknown) (voiced by Shawn Baichoo) is a French-Canadian chef residing in Boston. His father was a cook for the French army and died while fighting in the French and Indian War. Stephane took up his profession to honor him and moved to Boston in 1764. Beginning with 1765, he was part of several mobs that violently protested the British's treatment of their colonies, in particular their heavy taxation. In 1773, when tax collectors come to Stephane's house to demand he pay his taxes, the latter angrily refuses and calls them thieves before starting to fight them. After Connor, who happened to be nearby, helps him defeat the tax collectors and their enforcers, Stephane continues with his violent protest, eventually killing a taxman who was working for the Templar William Johnson. Connor later informs Stephane of the existence of the Assassins and Templars and invites him to join the Brotherhood and fight against injustice. Stephane accepts and becomes Connor's first Assassin recruit, assisting him several times throughout the American Revolution, most notably during the Boston Tea Party.
- Duncan Little (1730 – unknown) (voiced by Julian Casey) is an Irish-born colonist living in Boston. He is also the nephew of Miko, the leader of the British Assassin Brotherhood who was killed by Haytham in 1754. Duncan entered priesthood at a young age and was a missionary for several years, but eventually realized the priest life was not for him and moved to America in 1763, after receiving harsh treatment by his family for abandoning the Catholic Church. Here, he quickly gained a reputation as a skilled mediator and helper of the people. In 1773, Duncan becomes acquainted with Connor and requests his help in eliminating a group of mercenaries threatening the livelihoods of Boston's residents. After killing the leader of the mercenaries, revealed to be a Templar, Connor tells Duncan the truth about the Assassin-Templar conflict and recruits him into the Brotherhood.
- Clipper Wilkinson (1756 – unknown) (voiced by Joe Cobden) is a hunter and marksman residing in New York. Born in Virginia as the youngest of five children, he eventually grew tired of having to compete against his siblings and chose to move away, becoming estranged from his family; even more so when the American Revolutionary War broke out and Wilkinson's family sided with the Loyalists. While in Boston in 1775, Wilkinson notices many young men and boys being forcefully conscripted by the British and reaches out to Connor for help. After eliminating the British recruiters and their leader, who was actually a Templar, Connor informs Wilkinson of the existence of the Assassins and Templars and invites him to join the Brotherhood to continue fighting in the name of freedom.
- Deborah "Dobby" Carter (1736 – unknown) (voiced by Angela Galuppo) is courier living in New York. The daughter of a merchant suffering from heavy debt from constantly bankrupting businesses, she was orphaned at a young age and was forced to become an errand-runner to survive on the streets. She posed as a boy, taking the name "Dobby," in the hopes of securing more work opportunities; most of her employers saw through her disguise, but hired her nonetheless because of her skills. Upon reaching adulthood, she dropped this facade, but kept her "Dobby" nickname and continued her courier work. She also developed a reputation for helping the poor, always doing her best to aid the less fortunate, even if it meant fighting merchants to ensure they were not charging exorbitant prices. In 1777, amidst a food shortage in New York, Deborah meets Connor and enlists his help in assisting the people suffering because of the famine, as well as tracking down the perpetrators. After recovering the stolen food and killing the thieves—revealed to be Templars—Connor tells Deborah the truth about the Assassin-Templar conflict and recruits her to the Brotherhood. It is implied that Deborah has romantic feelings for Connor, as she flirts with him several times and offers to be his first partner if he ever decides on settling down and starting a family.
- Jacob Zenger (1739 – unknown) (voiced by Danny Blanco Hall) is a German-born colonist residing in New York. Born near Mannheim in southeast Germany, Jacob is one of thirteen siblings (although only four of them reached adulthood along with him) and is married with a child. Because of the family's poverty and his poor career prospects in Mannheim, Jacob enlisted in the German army and, when the American Revolutionary War broke out, became one of the Hessians sent to support the British army. After arriving overseas, however, he left the service and moved to New York. At one point, he bought a plot of land and attempted to become a farmer, hoping to one day bring his wife and son to America to live with him, but after a string of crop failures he was forced to move back to the city and take up work as a bodyguard. In 1777, after New York is placed under martial law by the British, Jacob joins a resistance movement to liberate the city and meets Connor, who offers to assist him. Upon killing the officer in charge of the martial law, a Templar, Connor informs Jacob of the existence of the Assassins and Templars and recruits him into the Brotherhood.
- Jamie Colley (1744 – unknown) (voiced by Marcel Jeannin) is a colonist living in New York. Jamie's father was a dock worker who left the family during Jamie's youth, while his mother cared for slaves on a plantation in the southern colonies, causing Jamie to become estranged from her. As a child, he attended Trinity School for three years, where many professors took notice of his intellect and determined that he "was destined for great things." Despite this, he had trouble finding work for many years and was forced to take several odd jobs until a physician finally recognized his potential and hired him as his assistant. In 1777, while caring for people affected by the Great Fire of New York, Jamie meets Connor and requests his help in preventing the spread of an epidemic. After dealing with several Templars who attempted to kill the people infected by the disease to prevent its spread, Connor tells Jamie the truth about the Assassin-Templar conflict and recruits him into the Brotherhood. Jamie would later admit to Connor that he considers him and the Assassins his true family rather than his parents.

=== Davenport Homestead residents ===
Over the course of the game, Connor can encounter several people suffering from displacement due to the American Revolutionary War and invite them to start new lives at the Davenport Homestead, which over time turns into a small, united community.

- Godfrey (voiced by Harry Standjofski) and Terry are two Scottish lumberjacks who lived north of Champlain, New York with their wives, Catherine and Diana (voiced by Ellen Newlands) and their children. They are the first people to be invited to the Davenport Homestead, after a young Connor saves Terry from drowning in a river in 1769, and they set up a sawmill, providing the homestead with lumber.
- Lance O'Donnell is a carpenter who lived and worked in Boston until being evicted by the Loyalists due to his lack of support for them. He is invited to the Davenport Homestead after Connor saves him from several thugs who tried to rob him on the road and sets up a new workshop, creating wooden items from lumber provided by Godfrey and Terry.
- Myriam is a huntress who refused to conform to the social norms expected of her and elected to live in the wild instead, causing her to lose touch with her family. After encountering a group of poachers hunting on the lands of the Davenport Homestead, she confronts them and is injured as a result, before being found and rescued by Connor. Once Connor deals with the poachers, Myriam is invited to stay at the homestead and sets up a camp, where she hunts, skins and roasts animals, thus providing the homestead with meat and other animal materials. She later marries Norris.
- Norris (real name Maurice) is a miner hailing from Montreal who had trouble finding employment due to people disliking his accent and changed his name because many could not pronounce it correctly. After being saved by Connor from several guards assaulting him in Boston, Norris is invited to move to the Davenport Homestead and work on the mine there, providing the homestead with coal and other minerals. He later develops romantic feelings for Myriam and asks for Connor's help impressing her; the two eventually get married.
- Warren and his wife Prudence (voiced by Lucinda Davis) are farmers who are invited to the Davenport Homestead by Connor after he saves them from British soldiers who had assaulted them for not giving up their produce. The two set up a new farm (their previous one having been destroyed by the British) and provide the homestead with vegetables and various animals products. Prudence later gives birth to a boy, whom she and Warren name Hunter.
- David Walston, commonly known as "Big Dave," is a blacksmith and former soldier who deserted the British army. After being saved by Connor from his former comrades who were preparing to execute him, he is invited to the Davenport Homestead, where he sets up a workshop and crafts weapons and other metal objects. He is later helped by Connor and the other homesteaders in fending off British soldiers who had come to recapture him.
- Oliver (voiced by David Francis) and his wife Corrine are innkeepers who used to run an inn in Boston until being evicted. They are invited to stay at the Davenport Homestead after bringing a wagon of ale and befriending several of the homesteaders, who appreciate the alcohol and good company. After Connor builds a tavern called The Mile's End, Oliver and Corrine begin running it, providing the homesteaders with drinks and cooked food in addition to accommodating travelers.
- Lyle White (voiced by Alex Ivanovici) is a doctor who used to run a practice in Boston until the Loyalists drove him out of business for treating wounded Patriot soldiers. After being found by Connor and recounting his story to him, he is invited to the Davenport Homestead, which was in need of a doctor. When Lyle later becomes overwhelmed by his work, he recruits Diana as his assistant.
- Ellen is a seamstress who was trapped in an abusive marriage until Connor saved her from a beating by her husband and invited her and her daughter Maria to move to the Davenport Homestead. After building a tailor workshop, Ellen begins creating various clothing items for the homestead's residents as well as other clients. Ellen is later found by her abusive husband, who wants her and Maria to move back with him, but he is driven away by Connor and the homesteaders.
- Timothy is a pastor hailing from London who moved to America, eventually making his way to the Davenport Homestead, where several residents convinced Connor to allow him to stay. After building a church, Timothy begins presiding over it, in addition to assisting his fellow homesteaders with various problems (such as reading their mail, as most of the homesteaders are illiterate). Connor is initially wary of Timothy, but the two grow closer after Achilles Davenport's funeral, and Connor has the option of playing Fanorona with him like he did with Achilles.

=== John de la Tour ===
John de la Tour (died 1745) is a French-Canadian Assassin considered to be the first Assassin active in Colonial America. In 1740, while attempting to establish an intelligence network for the French Brotherhood in Acadia, he met Achilles Davenport, who had come to the colonies to form his own Brotherhood. Although Achilles initially disliked John, believing him to be arrogant and reckless, the two came to respect each other as they worked together over the following years to build up the Colonial Brotherhood. In 1744, John purchased and then freed the slave Angélique-Denise, who went on to become Achilles' wife, Abigail Davenport, and he later sacrificed himself to save Achilles and Abigail during the Siege of Louisbourg in 1745. While never seen on-screen, John is mentioned in both Assassin's Creed III and Assassin's Creed Rogue, and his robes are available to wear as an alternate outfit for Connor.

=== Reginald Birch ===
Reginald Birch (1705 – 9 October 1757) (voiced by Gideon Emery) is the Grand Master of the British Rite of the Templar Order and a successful English businessman. Birch meets Haytham, the son of Birch's employer—Edward Kenway—at a young age and takes an interest in the boy's training. He later develops an obsession with the Isu and the Pieces of Eden and, after learning that Edward has conducted research on the Isu's Grand Temple which he wrote down in a journal, sends masked men to steal it and kill Edward. Following Edward's death, Birch becomes Haytham's legal guardian and personally oversees his training as a Templar. However, over time Haytham begins to question Birch's motives as the latter attempts to cover his involvement in Edward's death and the kidnapping of Haytham's half-sister Jennifer. In 1754, Birch sends Haytham to America to locate the Grand Temple based on notes from Edward's journal, as well as establish a permanent Templar presence on the continent. However, Haytham later finds and rescues Jennifer, who tells him that Birch is to blame for their family's demise. The two then storm Birch's chateau in France with Haytham's friend Jim Holden and kill his guards before Birch himself is killed by Jennifer with a sword that Haytham had embedded into Birch's bedroom door.

=== Jim Holden ===
James "Jim" Holden (died 28 January 1758) is a British soldier who served under Edward Braddock during his campaigns in the Dutch Republic. His brother had also served under Braddock and was executed for desertion, so Holden decided to avenge his death by helping Haytham with his investigation of Tom Smith, a mercenary in Braddock's employ with connections to the murder of Haytham's father Edward Kenway. From there, Holden and Haytham become good friends and Holden would continue to aid Haytham under the guise of being his "gentleman's gentleman." While Holden only makes a small appearance in Assassin's Creed III, his role is expanded in the novel Assassin's Creed: Forsaken, where he helps Haytham rescue his half-sister Jennifer and avenge Edward by killing Reginald Birch. However, during Jennifer's rescue, Holden is captured and sent to a monastery in Egypt where he is castrated. Although Haytham rescues him, Holden later commits suicide, unable to cope with what had happened to him.

=== Miko ===
"Miko" (died 18 April 1754) is the alias of the leader of the British Brotherhood of Assassins alongside Edward Kenway, and the holder of the Grand Temple Key. He is assassinated in 1754 by Haytham at the Royal Opera House on the orders of Reginald Birch, who sought to acquire the key in his possession. In the novel Assassin's Creed: Forsaken, it is revealed that Haytham had previously encountered Miko in 1753, when the latter was protecting an Assassin-allied codebreaker, Lucio Albertine, in Corsica, and that the hidden blades wielded by Haytham previously belonged to Miko, having been stolen by Haytham during their encounter.

=== Samuel Smythe ===
Samuel Smythe is the captain of the Providence, the merchant ship which transports Haytham across the Atlantic Ocean, from London to Boston, in 1754. He is notorious for his frugal business decisions and for treating his crew members poorly, although he does not punish them, unlike most Royal Navy captains.

=== Louis Mills ===
Louis Mills (died 21 May 1754) is a sailor and member of the British Brotherhood of Assassins. He serves as a crew member aboard the Providence during Haytham's journey across the Atlantic Ocean in 1754 and secretly throws marked barrels of cargo overboard to provide a trail that the Assassin ship, the Aquila, could follow. When the Aquila eventually catches up to and attacks the Providence, Haytham is sent below deck where Mills is waiting for him. After revealing his true affiliations, he is challenged by Haytham to a duel in which Mills is subsequently slain.

=== Charles Lee ===
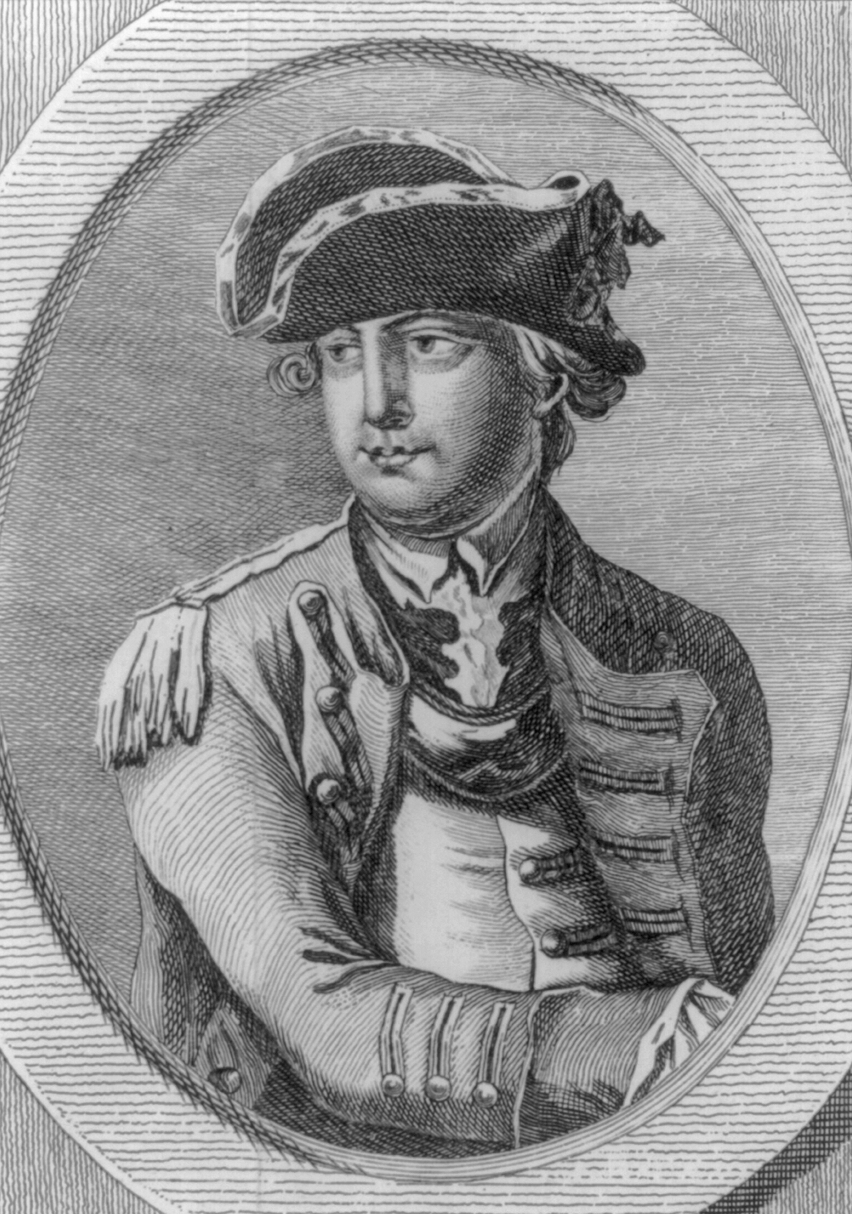
Major General Charles Lee

Charles Lee (6 February 1731 – 2 October 1782) (voiced by Neil Napier) is the secondary antagonist of Assassin's Creed III. He is a British-born soldier, and later a general of the Continental Army during the American Revolutionary War, as well as the second-in-command of the Colonial Rite of the Templar Order. Lee is first introduced in the game as a young man eager to prove himself to the Templar cause, who was assigned by Reginald Birch to aid Haytham in his mission to locate the Isu's Grand Temple and build a strong Templar presence in America. Lee helps Haytham locate and recruit several Templars for his expedition, and although their mission to find the Grand Temple is ultimately unsuccessful, Haytham formally inducts Lee into the Order in 1755, for the loyalty and bravery he has shown. In 1760, Lee meets a young Connor for the first time while leading another expedition in search for the Grand Temple, and threatens to harm his people if they do not help the Templars. When Connor's village is later destroyed on the orders of George Washington, Connor mistakenly assumes Lee was behind the attack and vows revenge on him and the Templars. Years later, during the Revolutionary War, Lee and his fellow Templars aim to take control of the Revolution by assassinating Washington, who was appointed Commander-in-Chief instead of Lee. It is during this plot that Lee encounters Connor again, now an adult, and recognizes him, before attempting to frame him for the assassination plot so that he would be executed; however, Connor is able to escape his execution and save Washington's life. Once Connor has killed all the Colonial Templars except Haytham and Lee, the latter attempts to hide in Fort George but is convinced by Haytham at the last minute to flee while Haytham stays behind to confront Connor, his son, and is killed as a result. Succeeding Haytham as Grand Master, Lee vows to destroy Connor and everything he holds dear, but is injured by him after a pursuit in Boston. Lee then retreats to a tavern in Monmouth County, where he shares one last drink with Connor in silence before the latter fatally stabs him.

=== William Johnson ===
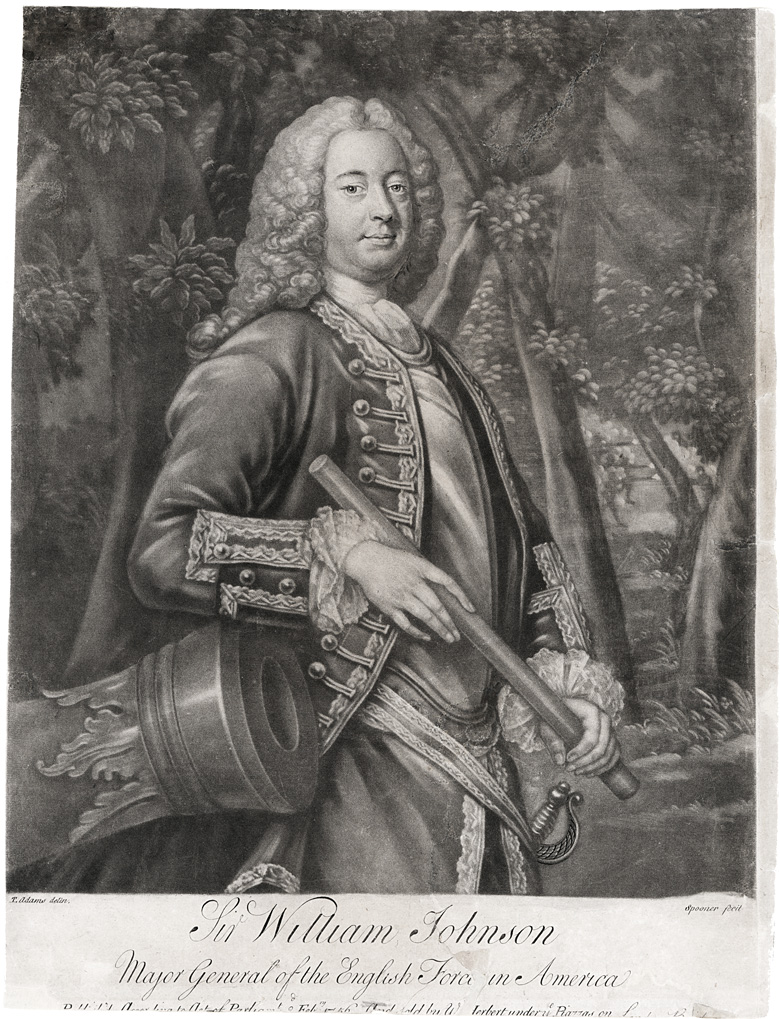
Mezzotint engraving of Sir William Johnson, 1756

Sir William Johnson, 1st Baronet (1715 – 11 July 1774) (voiced by Julian Casey) is an Anglo-Irish official of the British Empire, businessman, and member of the Colonial Rite of the Templar Order, who appears in both Assassin's Creed III and Assassin's Creed Rogue. He established many trading routes in the Thirteen Colonies, including with the Native Iroquois, with whom he developed good relations, and was appointed the British agent to the Iroquois and, later, British Superintendent of Indian Affairs. During the French and Indian War, he commanded both Iroquois and colonial militia forces against the French. In 1754, Johnson becomes the first Templar to be recruited for Haytham's expedition to search for the Isu's Grand Temple, due to his knowledge of the land and its Native people. He continues to serve with the Colonial Templars during the American Revolution, although in 1773 his business takes a major blow when a shipment of his British tea is dumped into the ocean by Connor and the Sons of Liberty, in what later became known as the Boston Tea Party. In 1774, Johnson holds a meeting with several Iroquois clan leaders at Johnson Hall, to negotiate the purchase of their land. However, the clan leaders perceive this as an attempt to subjugate them and refuse to comply to his demands, causing an annoyed Johnson to order the massacre of all clan leaders, only to be assassinated by Connor moments later. With his dying words, Johnson claims that he only sought to buy the Iroquois' land in order to protect it, and that with him gone, there will be no one left to defend the Iroquois from the colonists.

=== John Pitcairn ===
Major John Pitcairn

John Pitcairn (28 December 1722 – 17 June 1775) (voiced by Robert Lawrenson) is a Scottish officer in His Majesty's Marine Forces, as well as a member of the Colonial Rite of the Templar Order. In 1754, while serving in the Thirteen Colonies under the command of Edward Braddock, he is recruited by Haytham and Charles Lee for their expedition to find the Isu's Grand Temple, after the pair assault Braddock on one of his patrols to force him to release Pitcairn. By the time of the American Revolutionary War, Pitcairn has been promoted to the rank of Major and garnered a reputation as a respected peacekeeper. When the war breaks out in 1775, Pitcairn leads British troops during the Battles of Lexington and Concord and the Battle of Bunker Hill, but is assassinated by Connor during the latter. With his dying words, he reveals that he planned to make peace with the Patriots and chastises Connor for killing him, stating that his death will only worsen the war.

=== Thomas Hickey ===
Thomas Hickey (died 28 June 1776) (voiced by Allen Leech) is an Irish-born soldier in the British Army who served in the French and Indian War, but later joined the Continental Army during the American Revolutionary War. He is also a member of the Colonial Rite of the Templar Order, but does not share the other members' ideals and joined solely for profit. Hickey is first seen in Boston in 1754 as William Johnson's assistant and aids in Haytham's search for the Isu's Grand Temple. In 1776, during the Revolutionary War, Hickey is ordered by the Templars to assassinate George Washington in order to allow Charles Lee to replace him as Commander-in-Chief. Connor uncovers the plot and attempts to kill Hickey in New York, where the latter runs a secret counterfeit ring. However, both men are arrested by the Patriots and sent to Bridewell Prison, where the Templars manage to get Hickey pardoned and frame Connor for the plot against Washington, causing him to be sentenced to death and creating the perfect opportunity to murder Washington, who will be attending the execution. However, Connor is able to escape his execution and kill Hickey before he can get to Washington. With his dying words, Hickey mocks Connor for fighting for ideals instead of personal gain and claims that, while Connor's hands will always be empty, he had lived his life to its fullest.

=== Benjamin Church ===
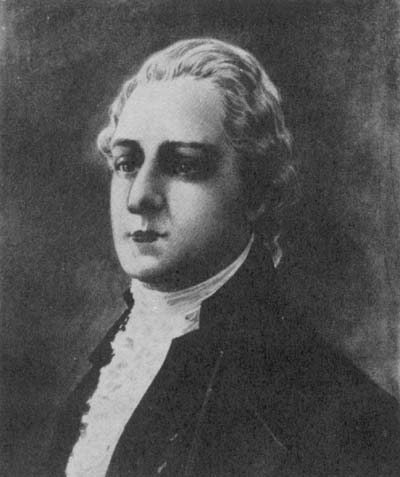
Dr. Benjamin Church

Benjamin Church, Jr. (24 August 1734 – 7 March 1778) (voiced by Graham McTavish) is a doctor who became the first Surgeon General of the United States Army, serving as the "Chief Physician & Director General" of the Medical Service of the Continental Army in 1775, during the American Revolutionary War. He is also a member of the Colonial Rite of the Templar Order, and in 1754 is recruited by Haytham and Charles Lee to aid their search for the Isu's Grand Temple, after saving him from the slaver Silas Thatcher (whom Church later kills as revenge for the torture inflicted upon him). During the early stages of the Revolutionary War, Church is caught spying for the British and arrested; although he is released after claiming the information he provided was fake and meant deter the British, he ends up betraying both the Continental Army and the Templar Order to pursue his own agenda. In 1778, he steals a large supply of weapons and medicine from a Continental convoy, intending to defect to the British side of the war, but is hunted down by both Connor and Haytham, who eventually catch him off the coast of Martinique and recover the stolen supplies. Church is brutally beaten by Haytham for his betrayal and then killed by Connor, claiming with his dying words that there is no such thing as a righteous path in life and that it is all a matter of perspective.

=== Nicholas Biddle ===
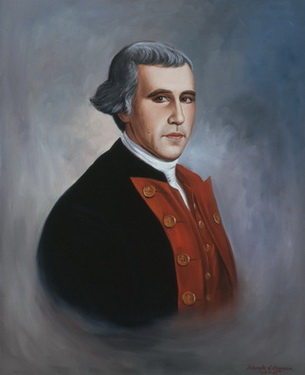
Captain Nicholas Biddle

Nicholas Biddle (10 September 1750 – 17 March 1778) (voiced by Fred Tatasciore) is a naval captain who served in the Royal Navy from 1770 to 1773, before joining the Continental Navy at the onset of the American Revolutionary War in 1775, becoming one of its first five captains. He is also a member of the Colonial Rite of the Templar Order, and conspires with his fellow Templars to stage attacks on American ships as a means of pressuring the Continental Congress into naming him an Admiral, thus giving the Templars more control over the nation's fledging naval service. Due to his intervention in the Assassin ships' trades and factory prices, Biddle is hunted down by Connor and Robert Faulkner, who eventually manage to catch him off the coast of the Bahamas in 1778. After a naval battle, Connor boards Biddle's ship, the USS Randolph, and mortally wounds him in combat. With his dying words, Biddle claims that he had only sought to empower the Continental Navy before making a final request that Connor let him sink with his ship, which the latter grants to him.

=== Edward Braddock ===
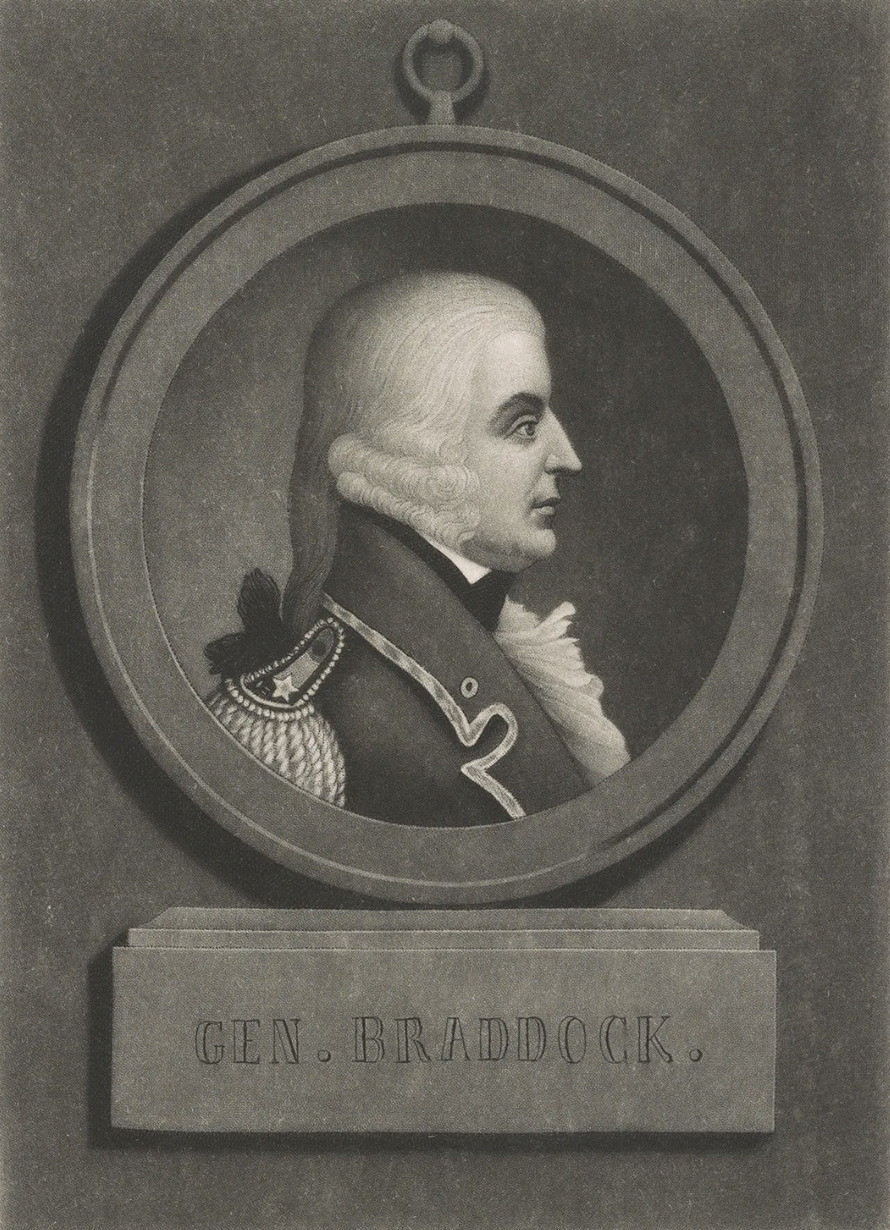
Major General Edward Braddock

Edward Braddock (January 1695 – 13 July 1755) (voiced by Carlo Mestroni), nicknamed "The Bulldog" by his soldiers, is a British officer who served as Major General in the British Army during the French and Indian War, as well as a former member of the Templar Order. Alongside Reginald Birch, he secretly engineered the murder of Edward Kenway in 1735, and became acquainted with Haytham while ostensibly searching for the perpetrators. In 1747, Haytham identifies one of the attackers as Tom Smith, a mercenary in Braddock's employ, but the latter is executed before Haytham can interrogate him, ostensibly for desertion (in reality Braddock was trying to cover up any loose ends regarding Edward's murder). Haytham then serves under Braddock for some time, during which the former notices Braddock becoming more brutal in his methods and distancing himself from the Templars' ideals, losing his trust in him. By 1754, Braddock has completely abandoned the Order and has been sent to serve in the Thirteen Colonies. He refuses to release John Pitcairn from his command in order to aid Haytham's search for the Isu's Grand Temple, resulting in the latter and Charles Lee assaulting him during a patrol to force him to comply. In 1755, while leading an expedition against the French-occupied Ohio River Valley, Braddock is ambushed by Haytham and his Templar allies, along with several Iroquois tribes whose villages had been ransacked by Braddock's men. He is mortally wounded by Haytham and dies four days later.

=== Silas Thatcher ===
Silas Thatcher (1720 – 14 July 1754) is a high-ranking and corrupt British officer and a prolific slave trader based in Boston in 1754. He has Benjamin Church kidnapped and tortured after the latter refuses to pay him protection money, until Church is rescued by Haytham and Charles Lee. Later, Haytham and his fellow Templars infiltrate Southgate Fort, where Silas is posted, by posing as soldiers bringing in a convoy of Mohawk slaves. After discovering the ruse, Silas orders his men to fire on the Templars, but is cornered by Haytham and executed by a vengeful Church.

== Characters of Assassin's Creed III: Liberation ==
=== Aveline de Grandpré ===
Aveline de Grandpré (20 June 1747 – unknown) (voiced by Amber Goldfarb) is the protagonist of Assassin's Creed III: Liberation and the Aveline downloadable content (DLC) for Assassin's Creed IV: Black Flag. She is a Louisiana Creole Assassin active in and around New Orleans during the mid- and late 18th-century who battles the Templars' attempts to take control of the region. The daughter of a wealthy French merchant and his African placée, Aveline dedicates herself to liberating oppressed slaves from a young age. Her fight for freedom eventually catches the attention of Agaté, the Mentor of the Louisiana Brotherhood of Assassins, who recruits Aveline to the Assassins in 1759 and subsequently trains her, although their relationship would deteriorate over time due to Aveline's disobedience and Agaté's secrecy. Aveline elects to keep her Assassin life hidden from her family, with the only person to be aware of it being her childhood friend Gérald Blanc, who was also recruited by Agaté. During her mission to eliminate the Templar Order, Aveline would meet and befriend her fellow Assassin Connor, who after the end of the American Revolutionary War, enlists her help in finding and recruiting new Assassins in order to rebuild the Colonial Brotherhood.

=== Gérald Blanc ===
Gérald Blanc (1745 – unknown) (voiced by Olivier Lamarche) is Aveline's childhood friend and closest confidant, who works as an accountant for Aveline's father, Philippe Olivier de Grandpré, and was also recruited into the Assassin Brotherhood by Agaté. Born in Acadia, Gérald was orphaned at a young age during the Great Expulsion and moved to New Orleans, where he was found and employed by Philippe, initially as a simple errand boy. Unlike Aveline, who was trained by Agaté to handle field work for the Brotherhood, Gérald was trained as an information officer and runs a spy network in New Orleans that acquires information to aid Aveline's missions. Gérald cares a lot about Aveline and harbors romantic feelings for her, which the latter is aware of but does not seem to reciprocate, believing they shouldn't "mix work with feelings." Following Philippe's death in 1776, Gérald inherits his business, as Aveline was unable to, but assures her that the business will remain hers in everything but name.

=== Agaté ===
Agaté (c. 1722 – 1777) (voiced by Tristan D. Lalla) is a former slave and the Mentor of the Louisiana Brotherhood of Assassins, who primarily operates from his hideout in the Louisiana Bayou. Born in Africa, Agaté was enslaved from a young age and, while working on a plantation in Saint-Domingue, befriended two other slaves, Baptiste and Jeanne (Aveline's mother), falling in love with the latter. All three eventually encountered revolutionary disruptor François Mackandal, who taught them the ways of the Assassins. In 1738, Agaté and Baptiste formally joined the Brotherhood and escaped the plantation with Mackandal, but Jeanne refused to do the same and stayed behind. Following their Mentor's death in 1758, Agaté abandoned Baptiste and traveled to Louisiana to establish his own Brotherhood, recruiting and training Aveline and Gérald Blanc to be his agents in New Orleans. Agaté cares for his students, especially Aveline, whom he sees as a daughter because of his past relationship with her mother, but is secretive in his dealings with them, causing Aveline to in turn disobey his orders regularly. Over the years, their mutual distrust of each another causes them to grow apart. When Aveline returns to Agaté in 1777 to reveal the identity of the true leader of Louisiana's Templar Order, he attacks her, believing her to have betrayed the Assassins. Aveline wins, causing Agaté, who is overwhelmed with humiliation, to leap to his death from the top of his treehouse.

=== Philippe Olivier de Grandpré ===
Philippe Olivier de Grandpré (1722 – 13 October 1776) (voiced by Marcel Jeannin) is a wealthy French merchant living in New Orleans and Aveline's father. Born in Nantes, France to a family of successful merchants, he traveled to Louisiana as a young man in search of new business opportunities and established a trading enterprise, shipping goods from the New World to the Old. In 1744, during a trade mission to Saint-Domingue, Philippe purchased a slave named Jeanne, whom he fell in love with and made his placée bride. In 1752, he was forced to marry Madeleine de L'Isle, the daughter of one of his investors, to alleviate his financial problems. Although Philippe assured Jeanne nothing would change between them, their relationship became strained over time, and Jeanne eventually disappeared under mysterious circumstances in 1757, causing Philippe to blame himself for driving her away. Philippe loves Aveline deeply and, although unaware of her double life as an Assassin, is nonetheless supportive of her life choices, such as her decision to remain unmarried and help run his business. After discovering signs of Templar interference in his business, Philippe is slowly poisoned by Madeleine, secretly the leader of the Louisiana Templars, and eventually passes away in 1776, leaving his estate to Madeleine and his business to Gérald Blanc.

=== Jeanne ===
Jeanne (c. 1725 – unknown) (voiced by Lucinda Davis) is an African former slave and Aveline's mother. Enslaved at a young age, she was sent to work on a plantation in Saint-Domingue, where she met two other slaves, Baptiste and Agaté, falling in love with the latter. While taught the ways of the Assassins by François Mackandal like Agaté and Baptiste, Jeanne opted not to join the Brotherhood due to its violent ways and remained on the plantation until 1744, when she was purchased by Philippe Olivier de Grandpré and moved with him to New Orleans. Having fallen in love with Philippe, she accepted to become his placée bride and gave birth to their daughter in 1747. However, the couple's relationship became strained after Philippe married Madeleine de L'Isle. Upon hearing rumors of Mackandal coming to Louisiana, Jeanne began to fear the Assassins coming after her to recover a stolen artifact known as the Heart of the Brotherhood, and enlisted Madeleine's help in fleeing Louisiana unnoticed. Madeleine arranged for her to be sent to an excavation site in Chichen Itza that was secretly run by the Templars, and in 1757 Jeanne abandoned her family without explanation; an act she would later come to regret. When Aveline comes to Chichen Itza in 1769 to investigate the Templars' activities, she is unexpectedly reunited with her mother, who realizes Aveline has become an Assassin and, assuming she was sent by Agaté to kill her, runs away. During Aveline's second visit to Chichen Itza in 1772, Jeanne, having accepted the life her daughter chose, tries to mend her relationship with her and apologizes for her earlier behavior, as well as abandoning Aveline and Philippe. Aveline forgives her mother and invites her to return to New Orleans, but Jeanne opts to remain in Chichen Itza, though she promises to stay in contact with her daughter.

=== Élise Lafleur ===
Élise Lafleur is a smuggler who, together with her partner Toussaint Roussillon, runs a smuggling operation in the Louisiana Bayou. She displays a sardonic and gruff personality and typically serves as the brains of the operation because of Roussillon rarely taking situations seriously. In 1766, when their operation begins to be threatened by Baptiste's followers, Élise and Roussillon encounter Aveline and help her track down Baptiste in order to put an end to his cult. From there, the two go on to become some of Aveline's most trusted allies as they assist her several more times, such as helping her investigate the mysterious disappearances of several slaves, sabotage an operation run by the Templar Diego Vázquez, and deliver a former slave named George Davidson to the Continental Army.

=== Toussaint Roussillon ===
Toussaint Roussillon (voiced by JB Blanc) is a smuggler who, together with his partner Élise Lafleur, runs a smuggling operation in the Louisiana Bayou. In contrast to Élise's gruff personality, Roussillon is a good-natured jokester who rarely takes situations seriously; despite this, Élise feels indebted to him because he saved her life in the past. In 1766, when their operation begins to be threatened by Baptiste's followers, Roussillon and Élise come into contact with Aveline and help her track down Baptiste in order to put an end to his cult. From there, the two go on to become some of Aveline's most trusted allies as they assist her several more times, such as helping her investigate the mysterious disappearances of several slaves, sabotage an operation run by the Templar Diego Vázquez, and deliver a former slave named George Davidson to the Continental Army.

=== Houngan ===
The houngan (voiced by Dave Fennoy) is an unnamed witch doctor living in San Danje, a small settlement in the Louisiana Bayou established by escaped slaves. He maintains a friendship with the smugglers Élise Lafleur and Toussaint Roussillon, who occasionally bring him supplies, and later also becomes an ally of Aveline, who consults him several times for his wisdom and knowledge of the general happenings in the area.

=== Carlos Dominguez ===
Carlos Dominguez (1730s – 1803) (voiced by Marcel Jeannin) is a Spanish ship captain hired by the Templar Rafael Joaquín de Ferrer to transport goods to and from New Orleans. While earning a small fortune from his employers, he spends most of it in taverns and is frequently drunk as a result. In 1765, Dominguez begins to redirect shipments meant for Gilbert-Antoine de St. Maxent, causing Philippe Olivier de Grandpré's shipping business to suffer. While investigating the missing shipments, Aveline charms Dominguez and then steals paperwork revealing the stolen goods' location while the latter is distracted. In 1768, Aveline tracks down Dominguez again and attempts to interrogate him to learn de Ferrer's plans for New Orleans, but is unable to because of Dominguez's drunken state. Later that same year, Aveline boards Domginguez's ship and attempts to destroy it in the hopes of luring Antonio de Ulloa out of hiding. Dominguez confronts and recognizes her, but after Aveline kills his guards, a terrified Domingues pleads for his life while promising to change his ways. Aveline spares Dominguez and later encounters him again at the docks. With his employment by the Templars terminated, Dominguez attempted to find other ways of earning money, only to be robbed by a trader he lent money to. After recovering Dominguez's money and helping him acquire a new ship, Aveline has Dominguez start working for her to repay his debt.

=== Gilbert-Antoine de Saint Maxent ===
Gilbert-Antoine de Saint Maxent (1724 – 8 August 1794) (voiced by Arthur Holden) was a French merchant and military officer who played a major role in the development of French and Spanish Louisiana, becoming one of the most affluent citizens of New Orleans. In the game, he is portrayed as a business partner of Philippe Olivier de Grandpré and makes several small appearances throughout the story.

=== François Mackandal ===
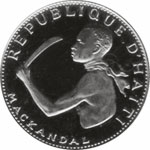
Mackandal on a 20 gourde coin, 1968

François Mackandal (died 20 January 1758) was a Haitian Maroon leader in the French colony of Saint-Domingue, as well as the Mentor of the Saint-Domingue Brotherhood of Assassins, mentioned several times in Assassin's Creed III: Liberation and Assassin's Creed Rogue. In 1732, he came into contact with Agaté, Baptiste, and Jeanne and began teaching them the ways of the Assassins. In 1738, Mackandal officially inducted the former two into the Brotherhood and helped them escape the plantation where they were forced to work. Mackandal would fight alongside Agaté and Baptiste for many years, during which time he also found several Isu artifacts, such as the Precursor box and the manuscript which could be used to decipher it, revealing the locations of various Isu temples around the world. However, these artifacts would be stolen by the Templars in 1751, after one of Mackandal's apprentices investigated an Isu temple and inadvertently triggered a massive earthquake that devastated Port-au-Prince. In 1758, Mackandal was burned at the stake following a failed attempt to poison the white colonists of Saint-Domingue, his public execution serving as a warning to both the Maroons and other Assassins.

=== Madeleine de L'Isle ===
Madeleine de L'Isle (1732 – 1777) (voiced by Leni Parker) is the main antagonist of Assassin's Creed III: Liberation. She is the second wife of Philippe Olivier de Grandpré (though the first to be legally recognized) and Aveline's stepmother, as well as secretly the leader of the Louisiana Rite of the Templar Order, operating under the alias of the "Company Man." Born into a wealthy merchant family in New Orleans, Madeleine discovered the Templars' existence at a young age, and was inducted into the Order in 1747 after impressing them. Upon learning of the Heart of the Brotherhood stolen by Jeanne, she used her Templar connections to negatively affect the business of Jeanne's husband Philippe and then began courting him, eventually forcing Philippe to marry Madeleine in 1752 to alleviate his financial problems. From there, she attempted to get close to Jeanne in order to obtain the stolen artifact. When Jeanne requested Madeleine's help in fleeing Louisiana, the latter arranged for her to be sent to an excavation site in Chichen Itza, where the Templars were overseeing the search for Isu temples, using liberated slaves as their workforce. Jeanne's departure allowed Madeleine to grow closer to Aveline and, upon learning that her stepdaughter had joined the Assassins, she pretended to take an interest in Aveline's secret mission to help oppressed slaves; under the guise of "rescuing" them, Madeleine would send these slaves to the Templar worksite in Chichen Itza. In 1776, after Philippe discovers signs of Templar interference in his business, Madeleine secretly poisons him, allowing her to inherit of his estate after his death. She also requests that Aveline help an escaped slave named George Davidson, who was promised freedom in exchange for his loyalty to the Templars. When Aveline later assassinates George upon discovering his Templar affiliations, she learns from him that Madeleine is the elusive "Company Man" that she has been pursuing and confronts her. Madeleine reveals that she has been secretly grooming Aveline to become a Templar and asks her to kill her mentor Agaté to prove her loyalty to the Order. When Aveline returns with evidence of Agaté's death and the Prophecy Disk (the Isu artifact which the Templars sought in Chichen Itza), Madeleine prepares to induct her stepdaughter into the Order, only to be killed by her, ending the Louisiana Templars.

=== Rafael Joaquín de Ferrer ===
Rafael Joaquín de Ferrer (1730s – 1769) is the secondary antagonist of Assassin's Creed III: Liberation. He is a Spanish Templar and the right-hand man of Madeleine de L'Isle. Born into a family that had long been loyal to the Templar Order, de Ferrer was sent to Cuba in 1750 to search for a Precursor box. After seducing the Assassin Rhona Dinsmore to steal her maps of the Yucatán Peninsula, de Ferrer searched the peninsula for the box, only to stumble upon the Maya city of Chichen Itza, which he was convinced had been built atop several ancient Isu temples. Over the following two decades, de Ferrer oversaw the excavation of the city using liberated slaves as his workforce, which were provided to him by Madeleine. Although de Ferrer would inflict harsh punishments or even execute any slave attempting to flee, most were oblivious to this fact and saw their lives on the worksite not as enslavement, but as being part of a peaceful community. In 1765, de Ferrer travels to New Orleans to acquire more workers for his site, as well as help Madeleine with her plans to take control of the city. To this end, he forges alliances with Jean-Jacques Blaise d'Abbadie and Baptiste, though both of these would fall through after the two men are assassinated by Aveline. In 1769, de Ferrer, upon returning to Chichen Itza, finally manages to locate an Isu temple containing one piece of an artifact called the Prophecy Disk, but is confronted by Aveline, who infiltrated the worksite disguised as a slave. In the ensuing fight, Aveline manages to kill de Ferrer and secure the Prophecy Disk piece.

=== Jean-Jacques Blaise d'Abbadie ===
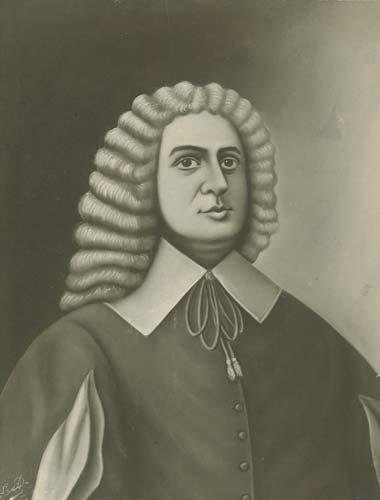
Governor Jean-Jacques Blaise d'Abbadie

Jean-Jacques Blaise d'Abbadie (1726 – 4 February 1765) (voiced by Bruce Dinsmore) was the French Governor of Louisiana from February 1763 until his death two years later. His administration primarily focused on systematically dismantling the French garrison to prepare the colony for occupation by English and Spanish forces, pursuant to the terms of the Treaty of Paris. In the game, d'Abbadie is portrayed as an ally of the Templar Order and makes a deal with Rafael Joaquín de Ferrer to hand over Louisiana to Templar plants within the Spanish government, who would allow d'Abbadie to remain in power and keep the colony French in exchange for providing de Ferrer with slaves for his worksite in Chichen Itza. However, this plan falls through when d'Abbadie is assassinated by Aveline in 1765.

=== Baptiste ===
Baptiste (1725 – 23 June 1766) (voiced by Kwasi Songui) is a voodoo leader and former Assassin operating in the Louisiana Bayou. Baptiste was born on a sugar plantation in Saint-Domingue, where he met two other slaves, Agaté and Jeanne, befriending the former. All three eventually came into contact with revolutionary disruptor François Mackandal, who taught them the ways of the Assassins. In 1738, Baptiste and Agaté formally joined the Brotherhood and escaped the plantation with Mackandal, fighting by his side for many years. Following their Mentor's death in 1758, Agaté abandoned Baptiste and traveled to Louisiana to establish his own Brotherhood. Feeling betrayed, Baptiste left the Assassins and followed Agaté to Louisiana, where he formed his own voodoo cult. To attract more followers, he decided to start impersonating Mackandal, going so far as to amputate his arm to resemble his former Mentor. He also sought to continue Mackandal's work by poisoning the nobility of New Orleans. In 1766, Baptiste makes a deal with the Templar Rafael Joaquín de Ferrer to locate Agaté and deliver him to de Ferrer, who in return would have Baptiste inducted into the Templar Order. To draw his former friend out of hiding, Baptiste has his followers set up many encampments throughout the Louisiana Bayou, threatening the smuggling operation run by Élise Lafleur and Toussaint Roussillon. The two later join forces with Aveline to locate Baptiste's hideout, where the voodoo leader is assassinated by Aveline amidst a ceremony with his followers.

Baptiste also appears in a deleted scene in the 2016 Assassin's Creed film, portrayed by Michael K. Williams (who also plays his descendant, Moussa).

=== Antonio de Ulloa ===
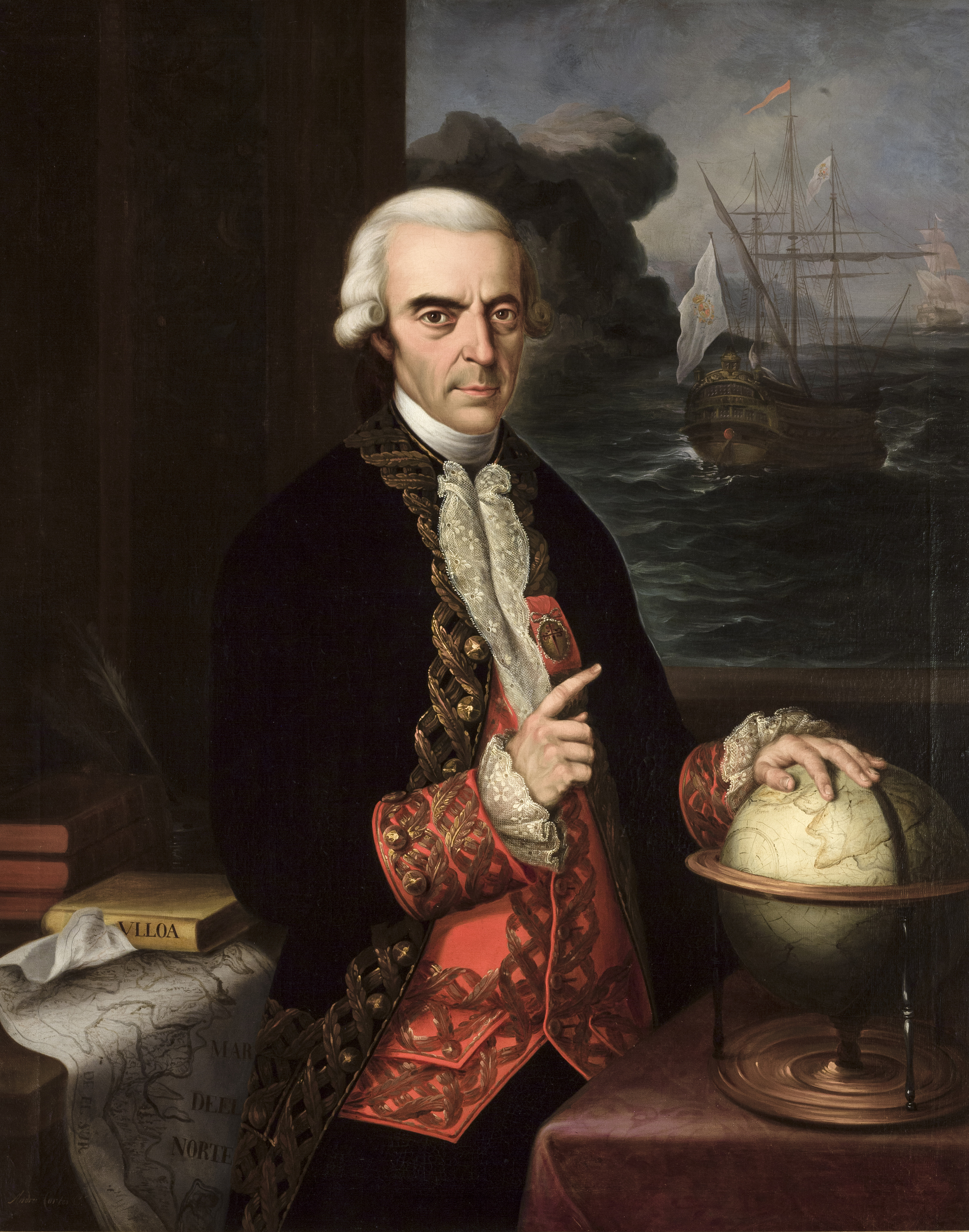
Portrait of Antonio de Ulloa by Andrés Cortés (1856)

Antonio de Ulloa (12 January 1716 – 3 July 1795) was a Spanish naval officer, explorer, scientist, and administrator who served as the first Spanish Governor of Louisiana beginning with 1766. His rule was strongly resisted by the French Creole colonists in New Orleans, who expelled him from the city in the Louisiana Rebellion of 1768. In the game, de Ulloa is portrayed as a secret member of the Templar Order, acting primarily as a scientific adviser. During his tenure as governor of Louisiana, he imposes strict trading restrictions, allows French officials to continue operating in New Orleans, and sets up a covert slave-trading operation, which is meant to provide the Templar excavation site in Chichen Itza with new workers. As a result, he is targeted by Aveline, who helps to incite the Louisiana Rebellion to draw de Ulloa out of hiding. While attempting to flee New Orleans, de Ulloa is attacked by Aveline and tells her about the Chichen Itza worksite in an attempt to save himself. Aveline ultimately spares the governor's life (despite having been ordered to kill him) and allows him to leave the city, but warns him that his Templar superiors will not be as forgiving about his betrayal and advises him to leave the continent for his and his family's safety. De Ulloa would take Aveline's advice and go into exile, retiring from both public life and Templar service in favor of a career in the Spanish Navy.

=== Diego Vázquez ===
Diego Vázquez (died 13 October 1776) (voiced by Conrad Pla) is a Spanish Templar who attempts to take control of the Louisiana Bayou in 1771, but his efforts are thwarted by Aveline and her allies. Later, in 1776, Vázquez, having rebuilt his forces, tries to steal supplies intended for the Continental Army, but is once again foiled by Aveline. That same year, while attending a ball at a plantation near New Orleans, he is assassinated by Aveline after being lured away from the party. With his dying words, he denies Aveline's accusation of being the Templar known as the "Company Man" that she has been hunting for years and reveals that the "Company Man" is actually a woman, though he passes away before he can reveal her identity.

=== George Davidson ===
George Davidson (1752 – 1777) (voiced by Christian Paul) is a former slave from West Africa who was freed by Madeleine de L'Isle in exchange for his loyalty to the Templar Order. In 1776, Madeleine asks Aveline to help George escape to the north. Upon escorting him out of New Orleans, Aveline enlists the help of her smuggler friends, Élise Lafleur and Toussaint Roussillon, in passing him into the care of the Continental Army. However, George ends up abandoning the Patriots and joining the Loyalists, enlisting in Lord Dunmore's Ethiopian Regiment, which promised freedom to all slaves who joined. In 1777, Aveline travels to the New York frontier in search of a Loyalist officer and Templar who possesses information regarding the identity of the elusive Templar known as the "Company Man." Upon discovering the officer is George, the latter attempts to flee, but Aveline blows up his carriage and mortally wounds him. With his dying words, George claims that he chose his own destiny and tells Aveline that the "Company Man" has been "in her own backyard all along", leading Aveline to realize the "Company Man" is none other than Madeleine.

== Characters of Assassin's Creed IV: Black Flag ==
=== Edward Kenway ===
Edward James Kenway (10 March 1693 – 3 December 1735) (voiced by Matt Ryan) is the protagonist of Assassin's Creed IV: Black Flag, who has also featured in several other works within the franchise. He is a Welsh-born privateer-turned-pirate during the final years of the Golden Age of Piracy who becomes caught in the Assassin-Templar conflict while searching for the Observatory, which he erroneously believes as housing treasure that would set him up financially for life. During his time in the West Indies, Edward befriends many historical pirates like Blackbeard, Mary Read, and Charles Vane, and helps them establish an independent Pirate Republic, though this would collapse in 1718. Eventually, after the deaths of most of his friends and allies, he begins to reflect on his life and decides to make amends for his past misdeeds by joining the Assassins in 1721. After helping the Brotherhood eliminate most of the West Indies Templars and seal away the Observatory, Edward officially retires from piracy and moves to London with his daughter, Jennifer Scott. There, Edward would father another child, Haytham Kenway, with his second wife, Tessa Stephenson-Oakley, and join the British Brotherhood, eventually rising through its ranks to become its co-leader. He also establishes his own commercial enterprise, which he uses as cover to travel around the world and search for more Isu sites like the Observatory. In 1735, Edward is killed in his family estate by mercenaries in the employ of Reginald Birch, his property manager and, secretly, the Grand Master of the British Templars, who sought to acquire Edward's journal detailing his research of the Isu. Edward is the grandfather of Connor and an ancestor of Desmond Miles through the paternal line.

=== Mary Read ===
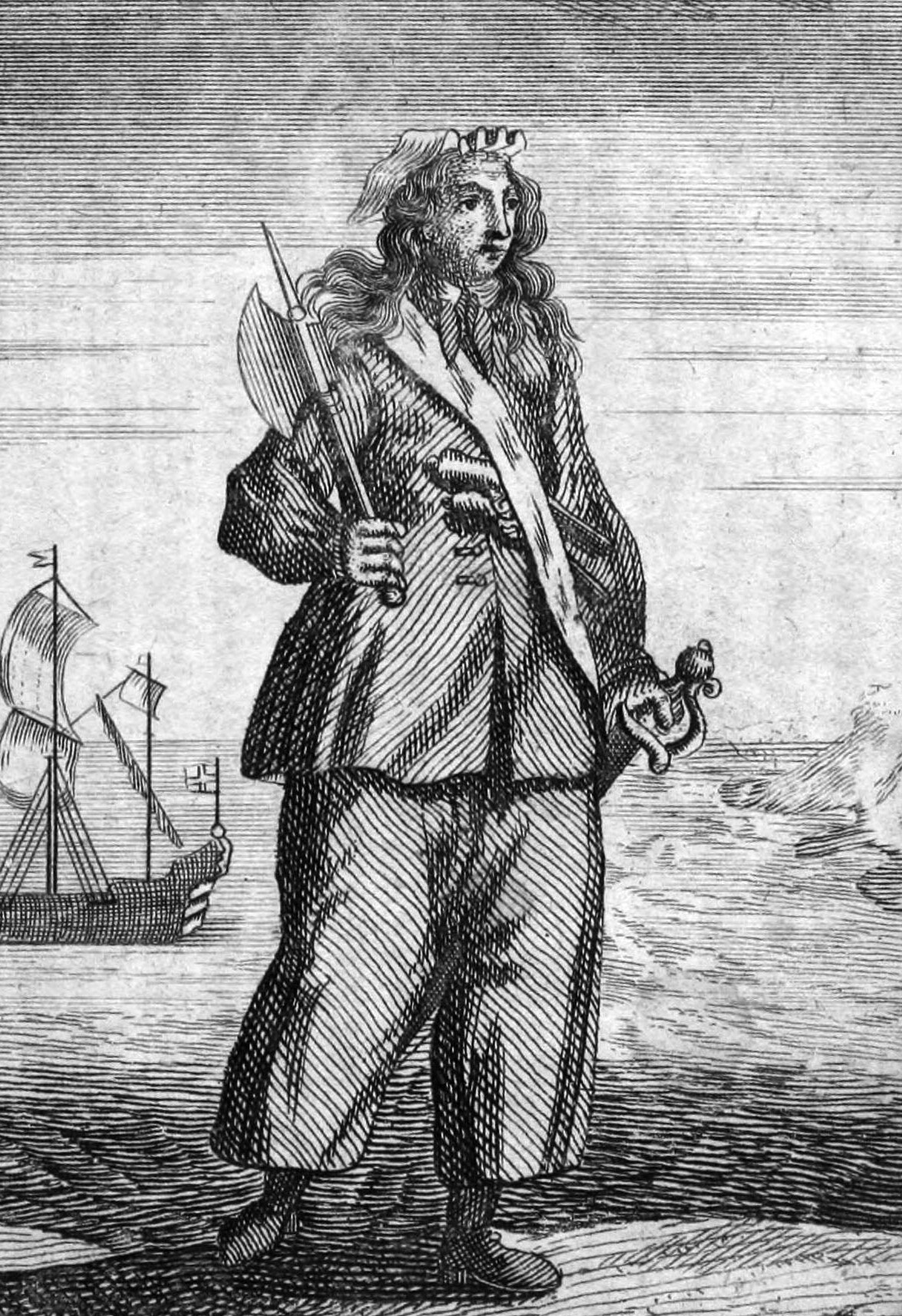
Mary Read as depicted in A General History of the Pyrates

Mary Read (died April 1721) (voiced by Olivia Morgan) was an English female pirate known for posing as a man throughout her life to accomplish her goals. In the game, she is depicted as a member of the West Indies Brotherhood of Assassins and a student of Ah Tabai, and initially adopts the persona of James Kidd, an illegitimate son of famous Scottish pirate William Kidd, in order to facilitate her career in piracy. As James Kidd, she is recognized as one of the founders of the Republic of Pirates. Mary befriends Edward Kenway, who is the first person to discover her true identity, and tries to encourage him to abandon his selfish ways and set him on the path to become an Assassin. In 1720, while sailing as part of John Rackham's crew, Mary and her friend Anne Bonny are captured by British authorities and imprisoned in Port Royal, where they are later sentenced to death for piracy, but manage to delay their executions by revealing they are both pregnant. In 1721, the pair are rescued by Edward and Ah Tabai, but Mary has fallen ill in the aftermath of childbirth and dies before she can escape the prison, making a final request to Edward that he redeem himself. Edward would later join the Assassins and attempt to make amends for his past actions in Mary's honor.

=== Edward Thatch ===
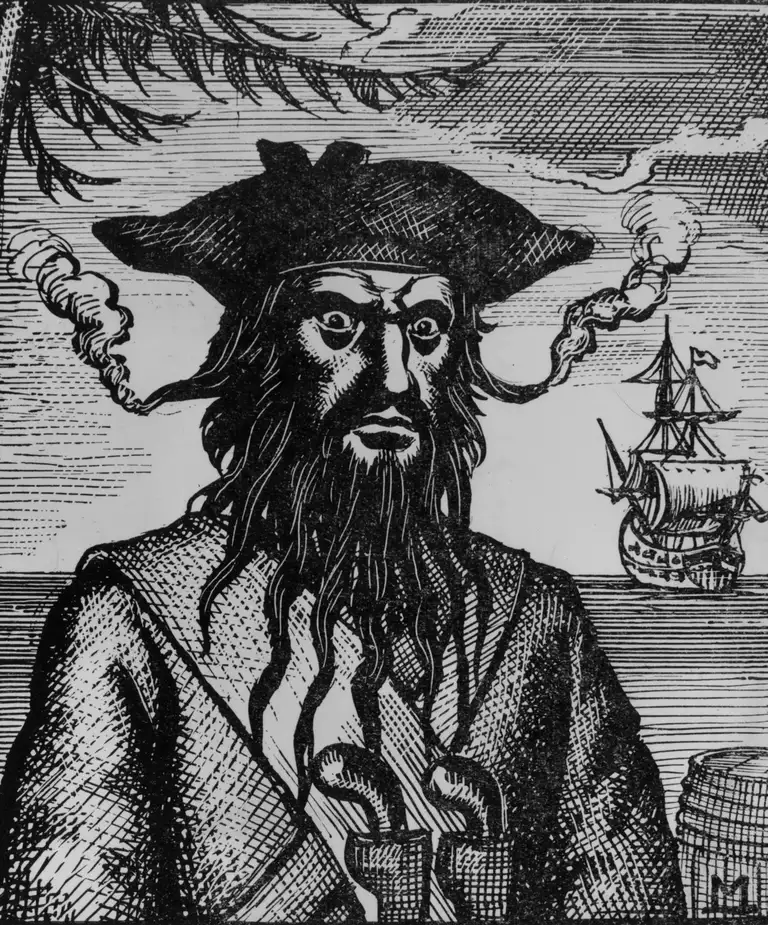
Edward "Blackbeard" Thatch

Edward Thatch (c. 1680 – 22 November 1718) (voiced by Mark Bonnar), better known by his alias Blackbeard, was a famous pirate captain of the Golden Age of Piracy who sailed the West Indies and the American colonies on his ship, the Queen Anne's Revenge. He was also one of the founders of the Pirate Republic of Nassau. In the game, Thatch is portrayed as a close friend and mentor of Edward Kenway, whom he met while they were both serving as privateers for the Royal Navy, and is a generally warm and friendly man who seeks to protect his dream of an independent pirate republic at all costs. Through the use of acting, showmanship and stunts such as lighting fuses in his hair and growing his beard long, he has cultivated a reputation of himself as a ferocious, bloodthirsty pirate so that he could intimidate his enemies into submission whilst avoiding violence. As the Pirate Republic begins to collapse in 1717, Thatch and Edward work together to try and save it, but their efforts prove futile when Nassau is later blockaded by the British in 1718. Admitting his dream is over, Thatch decides to retire from piracy and goes on one last pirating spree to fund his retirement. However, this catches the attention of the British authorities and, while Edward is visiting Thatch in North Carolina to convince him to re-join the Pirate Republic, they are attacked by a fleet of British ships. Edward tries to help Thatch fight them off, but the pirates are ultimately overwhelmed and Thatch is killed in battle while Edward is forced to escape.

=== Benjamin Hornigold ===
Benjamin Hornigold (1680s – September 1719) (voiced by Ed Stoppard) was an English privateer-turned-pirate active during the final years of the Golden Age of Piracy, who mentored both Edward Thatch and Edward Kenway. He was also one of the founders of the Pirate Republic of Nassau. As the republic begins to collapse in 1717, Hornigold argues with the other founders, as he is the only one who considers accepting the King's pardon and retiring from piracy. When Nassau is blockaded by the British in 1718, Hornigold meets with Woodes Rogers, the new governor of the Bahamas and a Templar, and accepts the pardon. Hornigold ends up joining the Templar Order himself due to sharing their ideals of order and purpose instead of blindly pursuing freedom like his fellow pirates, and becomes a pirate hunter, causing him to be seen as a traitor by his former allies. While attempting to kill Edward in 1719, Hornigold is lured to the Swan Islands, where he is ultimately assassinated by his former friend.

=== Charles Vane ===
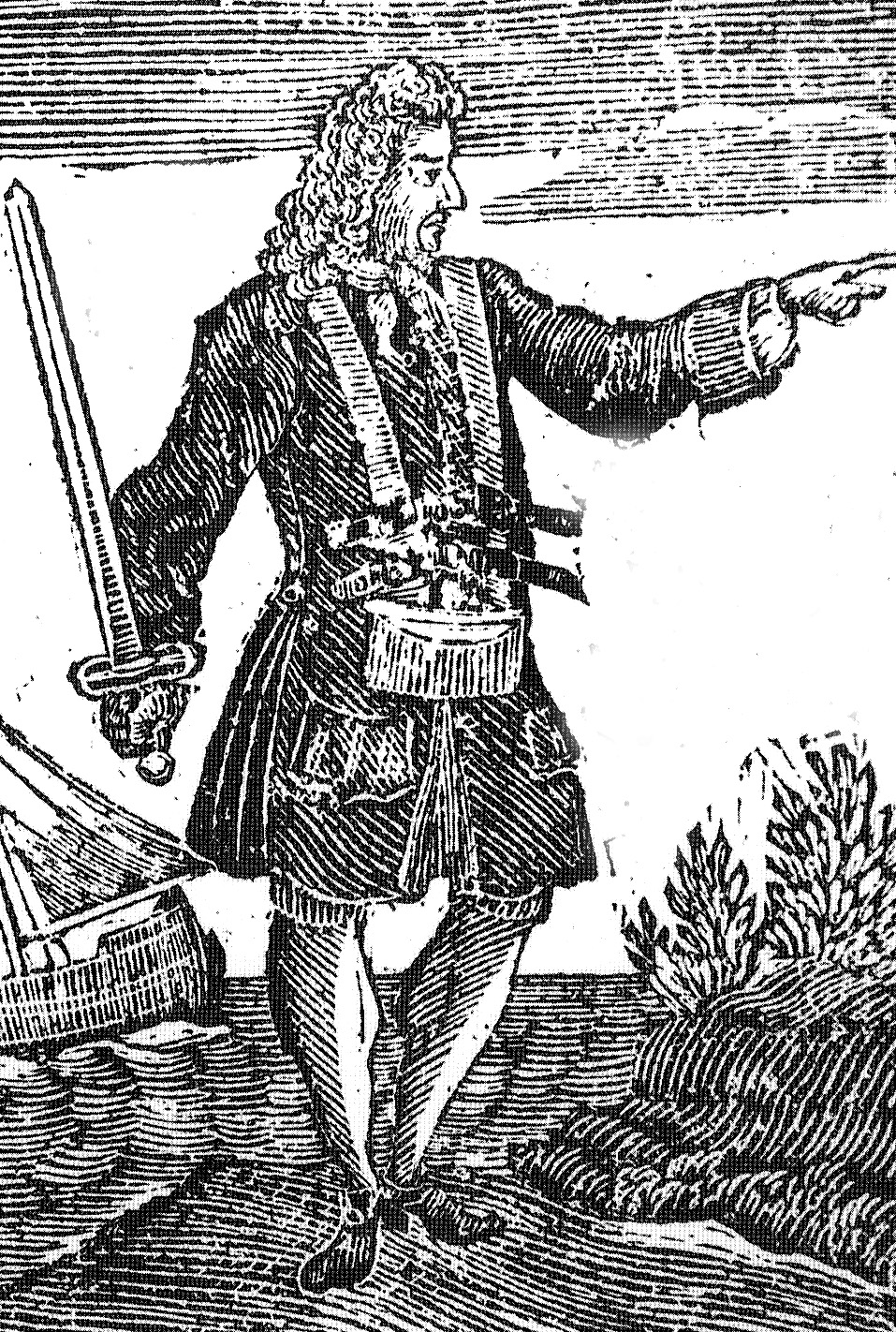
Early-18th century engraving of Charles Vane

Charles Vane (Hanged 29 March 1721) (voiced by Ralph Ineson) was an English pirate captain who sailed the West Indies on his brig, the Ranger, during the final years of the Golden Age of Piracy. After joining the Pirate Republic of Nassau in early 1717, he quickly rose to become one of its leaders. In the game, Vane is portrayed as a rude, foul-mouthed, and self-centered pirate, and is notorious for his harsh treatment of merchant seafarers and soldiers alike. Despite this, he is able to establish a friendship with Edward Kenway, and the two work together to escape from Nassau after it is blockaded by the British in 1718, and later team up again to search for the Observatory. While attempting to capture the Sage, Bartholomew Roberts, who could lead them to the Observatory, Vane's quartermaster, John Rackham, stages a mutiny and has Vane and Edward marooned on the deserted island of Isla Providencia. During his time on the island, Vane is driven mad with desperation and turns on his former friend, who defeats and subsequently abandons him. Vane would eventually be found by British authorities and imprisoned in Port Royal, where Edward, who was also imprisoned there, encounters him in 1721, awaiting execution for piracy. Edward briefly considers saving his former friend, but after seeing that Vane has fully succumbed to his insanity, he decides to leave him to his fate. Vane would be hanged a few days later, on 29 March 1721.

=== Stede Bonnet ===
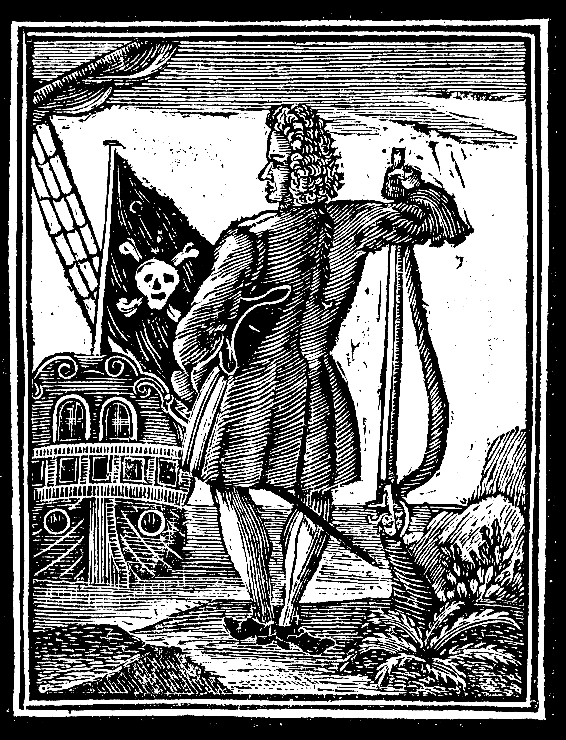
Engraving of Stede Bonnet from A General History of the Pyrates (1724)

Stede Bonnet (c. 1688 – 10 December 1718) (voiced by James Bachman) was an early 18th-century Barbadian pirate of English descent who sailed the Eastern Seaboard of the Thirteen Colonies. Despite his infamy, he earned the nickname of "The Gentleman Pirate", due in part to the fact that he was a moderately wealthy landowner prior to turning to piracy, owning a profitable sugar plantation in Barbados. In the game, Bonnet is portrayed as a jolly and gracious, if somewhat naive man, who greatly values his friends. He is first encountered by Edward Kenway prior to his turn to piracy, in Cape Bonavista, where Bonnet's ship, the Revenge, was waylaid by British authorities under suspicion of having been involved in a nearby naval battle (which Edward himself had taken part in). After saving Bonnet, Edward, posing as the Assassin Duncan Walpole, accompanies him to Havana, where he later reveals his true identity to him. In 1717, Bonnet, having grown restless with "the tedium of domesticity", decides to abandon his comfortable life as a family man and pursue a career in piracy instead, joining the Pirate Republic of Nassau, where he meets and befriends Edward Thatch. While being mentored by Thatch, he encounters Edward again several times, before leaving Thatch's crew to become an independent pirate captain. During his final interaction with Edward, Bonnet thanks him for the courage he has inspired him, and tells him that their friendship has been his most valuable find. Bonnet would later be captured by the British during the Battle of Cape Fear River and hanged for piracy on 10 December 1718.

=== Anne Bonny ===
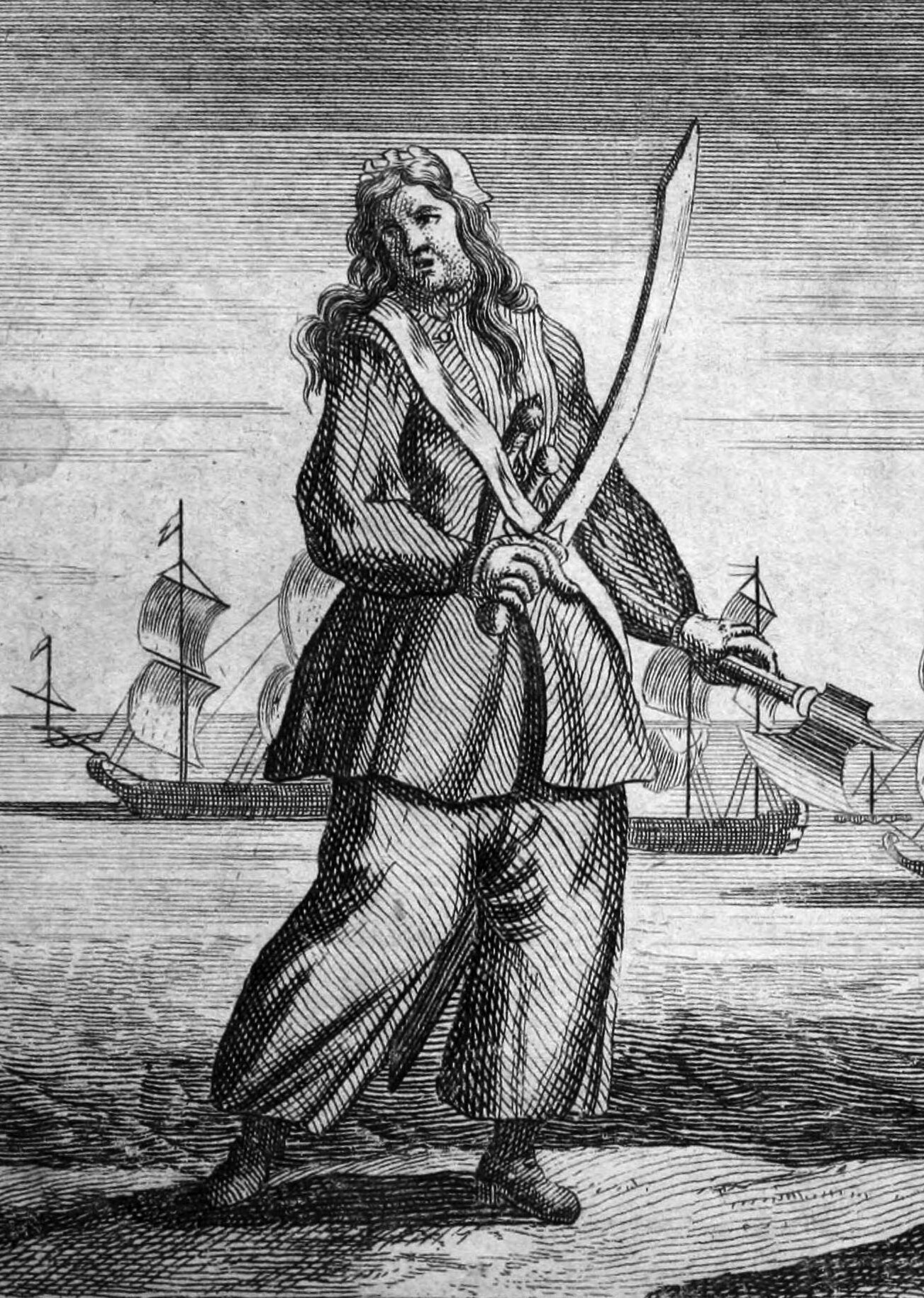
1724 engraving of Bonny from A General History of the Pyrates

Anne Bonny (unknown) (voiced by Sarah Greene) was a notorious female pirate who operated in the West Indies during the final years of the Golden Age of Piracy. After arriving in the Pirate Republic of Nassau in early 1716, she takes up work as a barmaid and becomes acquainted with several pirates, including Edward Kenway, Jack Rackham, and Mary Read, whom she befriends. She eventually enters a relationship with Rackham and joins his pirate crew alongside Mary. After escaping Nassau, which had been blockaded by the British, in 1720, the trio execute a series of swift robberies, intending to settle down with their gained wealth. However, the entire crew is later arrested by the British authorities and taken to Port Royal for trial, were both Anne and Mary are able to delay their execution by relying on the defense of pleading the belly. In 1721, Anne successfully escapes prison with the help of Edward and the Assassin Mentor Ah Tabai, but Mary dies from an infection in the aftermath of childbirth. After her son also dies shortly upon his birth, Anne sinks into a deep depression until Edward helps her recover. Anne subsequently joins Edward's crew as his quartermaster aboard the Jackdaw, replacing Adéwalé, who had joined the Assassins. When Edward leaves for England in October 1722, Anne decides to stay in the West Indies.

=== John Rackham ===
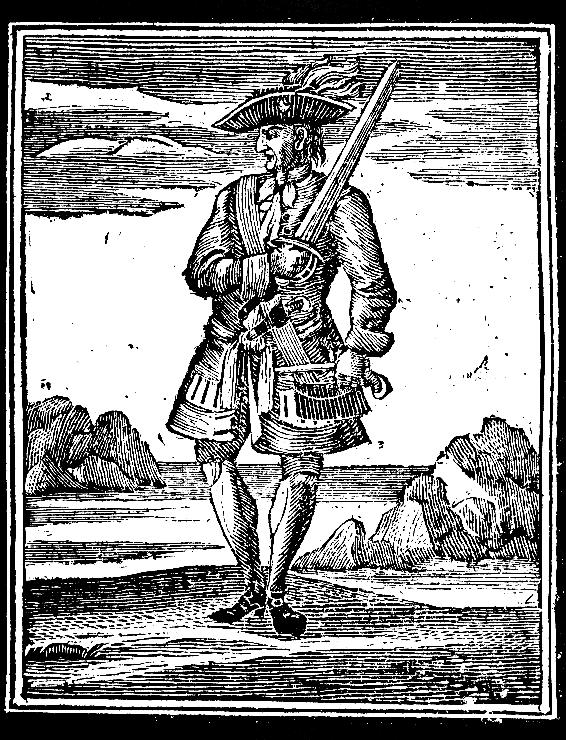
John Rackham as depicted in A General History of the Pyrates

John Rackham (Hanged 18 November 1720) (voiced by O-T Fagbenle), was a Jamaican-born British pirate who operated in the West Indies during the early 18th century. In the game, Rackham is introduced as a quartermaster serving under Charles Vane, and later rallies enough support from the crew to depose him as captain in November 1718, marooning both Vane and Edward Kenway. After a short tenure of only two months as captain, Rackham travels back to Nassau to accept the King's Pardon, thought he would return to piracy by 1720. Together with Anne Bonny, who became his lover, and Mary Read, he plunders and pillages the region for a few months before the entire crew is arrested by the British authorities. Rackham is later tried and executed for piracy in Port Royal on 18 November 1720.

=== John Cockram ===
John Cockram (1689 – 19 June 1719) (voiced by Diarmaid Murtagh) was an English pirate active in the West Indies during the tail end of the Golden Age of Piracy, best known for his association with Benjamin Hornigold. In the game, Cockram is depicted as Hornigold's deputy during the latter's tenure as one of the leaders of the Pirate Republic in Nassau. When Hornigold later accepts the King's Pardon and joins the Templar Order due to his dissatisfaction with the state of Nassau, Cockram does the same and becomes a pirate hunter. Alongside Josiah Burgess, he is tasked with capturing the Sage Bartholomew Roberts, who can lead the Templars to the Observatory. In 1719, Cockram and Burgess manage to track Roberts to Príncipe and kill most of the pirate crew he was serving with, though they are both assassinated by Edward Kenway in order to win Roberts' trust.

=== Josiah Burgess ===
Josiah Burgess (1689 – 19 June 1719) (voiced by Christopher Hatherall) was an English pirate who operated in the West Indies during the early 18th century. By 1717, he was one of the most prominent members of the Pirate Republic of Nassau. In 1718, alongside Benjamin Hornigold and John Cockram, Burgess accepts the King's Pardon and joins the Templar Order due to his dissatisfaction with the state of Nassau, becoming a pirate hunter and pursuing many of his former allies. Alongside Cockram, he is tasked with capturing the Sage Bartholomew Roberts, who can lead the Templars to the Observatory. In 1719, Burgess and Cockram manage to track Roberts to Príncipe and kill most of the pirate crew he was serving with, though they are both assassinated by Edward Kenway in order to win Roberts' trust.

=== Ah Tabai ===
Ah Tabai (1660s – c. 1745) (voiced by Octavio Solorio) is the Mentor of the West Indies Brotherhood of Assassins, operating out of the former Maya city of Tulum in the Yucatán Peninsula. During his tenure as Mentor, the Assassins' main objective is to protect the Observatory, which they attempt to do by preventing the Templars from capturing the Sage Bartholomew Roberts, the only man who knows the Observatory's location. However, the Brotherhood suffers many losses due to the actions of Edward Kenway, who sold maps detailing the Assassins' hideouts in the region to the Templars for personal gain. Because of this, Ah Tabai is initially distrustful of Edward and believes that he does not deserve to wear the robes the stole from the rogue Assassin Duncan Walpole. However, as Edward begins to slowly redeem himself and tries to make amends for his actions by eliminating the Templars and offering his hideout in Great Inagua to the Brotherhood as replacement for the compromised ones, Ah Tabai comes to respect him and see him as a true Assassin. Ah Tabai eventually passes away of old age around 1745, his final act as Mentor being to send one of his students, Achilles Davenport, to establish a new branch of the Brotherhood in the American colonies.

=== Opía Apito ===
Opía Apito (c. 1695 – unknown) is a Taíno Assassin of the West Indies Brotherhood who leads their bureau on the Cayman Islands during the early 18th century. After most of her tribe was captured or killed by Spanish troops in her youth, she learned to survive on her own and, in the 1710s, was recruited by the Assassins as a guide, though she soon officially joined their ranks. In 1716, her bureau comes under attack by Templar forces led by Lucia Márquez, after its location was compromised by Edward Kenway. Wishing to make amends and also seeking a Templar key in Lucia's possession, Edward helps Opía protect the bureau and assassinate Lucia.

=== Antó ===
Antó (1670 – unknown) (voiced by Kwasi Songui) is an Akan slave-turned-Assassin, who leads the West Indies Brotherhood's bureau in Kingston during the early-to-mid 18th century. After escaping slavery with the help of Maroon leader Cudjoe, Antó dedicated himself to freeing other slaves and helping the Maroons, entering a long-standing conflict with the British officer and Templar Kenneth Abraham. In 1716, his bureau comes under attack by Abraham's forces, after its location was compromised by Edward Kenway. Wishing to make amends and also seeking a Templar key in Abraham's possession, Edward helps Antó protect the bureau and assassinate Abraham. In 1721, Antó meets Edward again after the latter has joined the Assassins, and helps him plan his assassination of Woodes Rogers.

=== Rhona Dinsmore ===
Rhona Dinsmore (1688 – unknown) (voiced by Lynsey-Anne Moffat) is a Scottish-born Master Assassin of the West Indies Brotherhood, who leads their bureau in Havana during the early-to-mid 18th century. After leaving her dysfunctional family, Rhona traveled around the world in search of employment, and eventually found her true calling with the Assassins. During her time in the West Indies, she became acquainted with Edward Kenway and entered a long-standing conflict with the Templar Hilary Flint, whom she secretly became attracted to. In 1717, her bureau comes under attack by Flint's forces, after its location was compromised by Edward. Wishing to make amends and also seeking a Templar key in Flint's possession, Edward helps Rhona protect the bureau and assassinate Flint. In 1722, Rhona meets with Edward again after the latter has joined the Assassins, and helps him plan his assassination of Laureano de Torres y Ayala. By 1751, Rhona was still serving as bureau leader in Havana, when she was seduced by the Templar Rafael Joaquín de Ferrer, who stole her maps of the Yucatán Peninsula to aid his search for a Precursor box.

=== Upton Travers ===
Upton Travers (1688 – unknown) (voiced by Bruce Dinsmore) is an English member of the West Indies Brotherhood of Assassins, who leads their bureau in Nassau during the early 18th century. Together with his younger brother Vance, he runs a smuggling operation in the Caribbean, using some of their profits to support the Assassin cause. In 1717, the Chinese pirate and Templar Jing Lang manipulates Vance into trying to kill Upton so that he could steal his piece of a treasure map the brothers had found and run away with her. Vance almost tricks Edward Kenway, who had come to make amends for compromising the bureau's location and to retrieve a Templar key from Jing, into doing the deed for him, but Edward is able to realize the deception in time. He then helps Upton kill Jing, as well as Vance for his betrayal.

=== Vance Travers ===
Vance Travers (1690 – 1717) (voiced by Michael McElhatton) is an English member of the West Indies Brotherhood of Assassins, and the younger brother of Upton Travers, the leader of the Assassin bureau in Nassau. The two brothers run a smuggling operation in the Caribbean, using some of their profits to support the Assassin cause. In 1717, Vance is manipulated by the Chinese pirate and Templar Jing Lang, whom he fell in love with, into trying to kill Upton so that he could steal his piece of a treasure map the brothers had found and run away with Jing. Vance almost tricks Edward Kenway, who had come to make amends for compromising the bureau's location and to retrieve a Templar key from Jing, into doing the deed for him, but Edward is able to realize the deception in time. He then helps Upton kill Jing, as well as Vance for his betrayal.

=== Duncan Walpole ===
Duncan Walpole (February 1679 – June 1715) is a member of the British Brotherhood of Assassins during the early 18th century, and a cousin of Robert Walpole, the first Prime Minister of the United Kingdom. Dissatisfied with his slow rise in the Brotherhood's ranks, Duncan secretly defects to the Templar Order in 1714, shortly before being sent to the West Indies to train with Ah Tabai. While there, he steals maps detailing the Brotherhood's hideouts in the region, which he intends to deliver to the Templar Grand Master, Laureano de Torres y Ayala, to prove his loyalty to the Templar cause and be formally inducted into the Order. However, while en route to Havana in 1715, Duncan's ship attacks a pirate brig, with both ships being destroyed in the ensuing battle, leaving Duncan and Edward Kenway as the only survivors. Duncan is then chased and killed by Edward, who appropriates his Assassin robes and equipment and steals his identity, intending to collect Duncan's reward for delivering the maps to Torres.

Duncan also appears in a deleted scene in the 2016 Assassin's Creed film, portrayed by Callum Turner (who also plays his descendant, Nathan).

=== Caroline Scott-Kenway ===
Caroline Scott-Kenway (1691 – 1720) (voiced by Luisa Guerreiro) is Edward's first wife, whom he met in 1711 in Bristol. Due to Caroline coming from a wealthy merchant family, as well as her being engaged to Matthew Hague, the son of a wealthy East India Company executive, her parents disagreed with her relationship with Edward, whose parents were modest sheep farmers. However, the couple did not let others' opinions stand in the way of their relationship, and eventually got married in 1712. While Caroline's mother was somewhat supportive of her daughter's marriage, her father Emmett, secretly a Templar, resented Caroline's decision and did everything in his power to try and break her and Edward up. Although Caroline was content with her modest life on the farm of Edward's parents, the latter dreamed of becoming a successful privateer and was unsatisfied with being unable to provide for his wife. Edward's delusions of grandeur and his habit of heavy drinking eventually put a strain in the couple's relationship, and Caroline left Edward to move back with her parents while concealing her pregnancy. Following Edward's departure to the West Indies, Caroline gives birth to their daughter Jennifer in 1713, but later contracts smallpox and dies in 1720. Edward would not learn about Caroline's passing or Jennifer's existence until 1722, when he arranged to meet his daughter and vowed to be a good father to make amends for abandoning Caroline.

=== Jennifer Scott ===
Jennifer Scott (1713 – 1805) (voiced by Angela Galuppo) is Edward and Caroline's daughter, born after her father's departure to the West Indies. Jennifer was raised by her mother until the age of 7, when Caroline died from an illness. After learning about Caroline's death and Jennifer's existence in 1722, Edward arranges for his daughter to come the West Indies so that he can meet her. He and Jennifer then move back to England, where Edward tries his best to be a good father to make up for abandoning Caroline, although Jennifer would always hold some resentment of her father and insist on keeping her mother's surname. In 1735, Jennifer discovers that Reginald Birch, Edward's property manager and one of her suitors, is secretly a Templar and informs her father, though the latter is unable to act on the information before Birch sends mercenaries to break into the Kenway family's home to steal Edward's journal. During the attack, Edward is killed, and Jennifer kidnapped and sold into slavery, becoming a concubine in Topkapı Palace before being sent to Damascus once she grows too old. Her half-brother Haytham Kenway spends years trying to track Jennifer down, and eventually rescues her in 1757, after which Jennifer informs Haytham that Birch is to blame for their family falling apart and helps him take revenge. After moving back to London, Jennifer stays in touch with Haytham, who writes to her about his dreams of uniting the Assassins and Templars one day, which Jennifer comes to share. Although Jennifer refuses to become directly involved in the Assassin-Templar conflict which claimed most of her family, she would make several propositions that the two factions should reconcile throughout the rest of her life, until her death in 1805.

=== Bartholomew Roberts ===
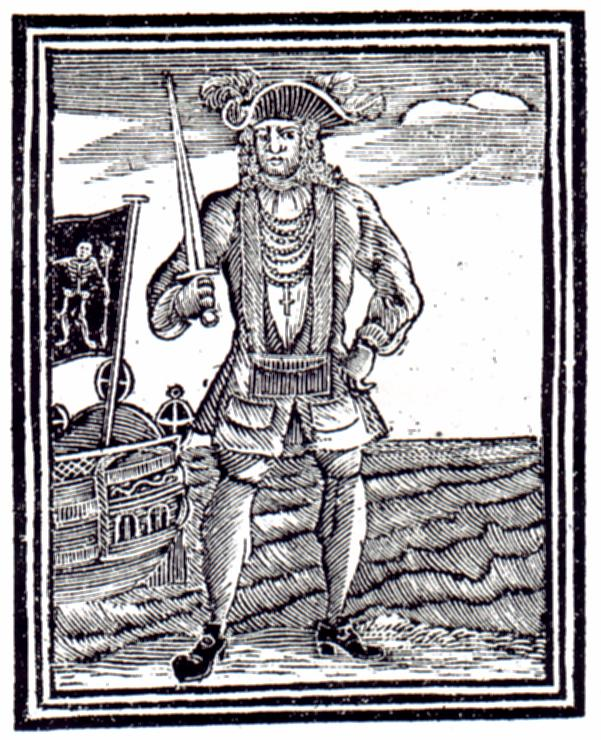
Bartholomew Roberts

Bartholomew Roberts (17 May 1682 – 10 February 1722) (voiced by Oliver Milburn), born John Roberts and also known by the moniker Black Bart, is one of the two main antagonists of Assassin's Creed IV: Black Flag. Historically, he was the most successful pirate of the Golden Age of Piracy (measured by vessels captured), raiding over 400 ships in the Caribbean and on the West African coast between 1719 and 1722. He was also notable for creating his own Pirate Code and for adopting an early variant of the Skull and Crossbones flag. In the game, Roberts is portrayed as a Sage, a reincarnation of the Isu Aita, who possesses memories of his past life, including the location of the Observatory, an Isu facility used for surveillance. For this reason, he is sought by both the Assassins, who wish to protect the Observatory, and the Templars, who seek to use the facility to spy on and blackmail world leaders. He is also pursued by Edward, who erroneously believes the Observatory to be housing a vast treasure, and who saves Roberts after he was cornered on Príncipe by the Templars, who killed his captain, Howell Davis. Taking Davis' place as captain, Roberts begins a career in piracy, and enlists Edward's help in securing a man o' war, which he renames the Royal Fortune, in exchange for taking him to the Observatory. Once he retrieves the facility's Crystal Skull, however, Roberts betrays Edward and turns him over to the British authorities. In 1722, he is killed by Edward aboard the Royal Fortune, who recovers the Crystal Skull and grants Roberts' final request to destroy his body, to prevent the Templars from obtaining anything from it.

=== Laureano de Torres y Ayala ===
Laureano José de Torres Ayala a Duadros Castellanos, marqués de Casa Torres (1645 – 1 September 1722) (voiced by Conrad Pla), often known as simply Laureano de Torres y Ayala, is one of the two main antagonists of Assassin's Creed IV: Black Flag. Historically, he was a Spanish military officer who served as Governor of Florida from 1693 to 1699, and Governor of Cuba on two occasions between 1707 and 1716. In the game, he is also portrayed as the Grand Master of the West Indies Rite of the Templar Order, who wishes to locate the Observatory to further the Order's goals. To this end, he pursues Bartholomew Roberts, the Sage who can lead the Templars to the Observatory, but his efforts to capture him are repeatedly thwarted by Edward Kenway, who seeks the Observatory for his own ends. Despite his failure to capture Roberts, Torres manages to locate the Observatory in Jamaica in 1722 and leads an expedition there, leaving behind a decoy in Havana, which is assassinated by Edward. Realizing Torres' deceit, Edward travels to Jamaica and ultimately kills the Templar Grand Master inside the Observatory. With his dying words, Torres praises Edward's growth over the past couple of years and the strength of his beliefs that humanity should be free, even if he disagrees with them.

=== Woodes Rogers ===
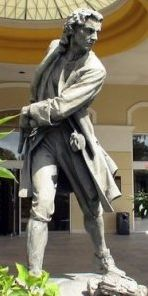
Statue of Woodes Rogers in Nassau, Bahamas

Woodes Rogers (c. 1679 – 15 July 1732) (voiced by Shaun Dingwall) is the secondary antagonist of Assassin's Creed IV: Black Flag. He was an English privateer and naval captain who served as the first Royal Governor of the Bahamas from 1718. In the game, Rogers is secretly a member of the West Indies Rite of the Templar Order, being inducted in 1715 by Grand Master Laureano de Torres y Ayala, and is portrayed as a ruthless pirate hunter, wishing to end piracy in the Caribbean at all costs. After becoming governor, he blockades Nassau and offers the King's Pardon to any pirate willing to retire, while also recruiting Benjamin Hornigold, John Cockram, and Josiah Burgess to the Templar cause. In 1721, during a party in Kingston celebrating the end of Rogers' tenure as governor and his recall to London, he is mortally wounded by Edward Kenway during an assassination attempt, and tells the Assassin about the whereabouts of Bartholomew Roberts so that he can stop him from misusing the Observatory. Rogers survives his injuries but is later expelled from the Templar Order for his refusal to cease trading slaves, and returns to England bankrupt and humiliated. Edward is informed of Rogers' survival in 1722, and promises to deal with him once he goes back to England. Rogers would eventually manage to rebuild his fortune and reputation, and would serve a second term as Governor of the Bahamas from 1728 until his death in 1732.

=== Julien du Casse ===
Julien du Casse (1682 – September 1715) (voiced by Alex Ivanovici) is a French arms dealer and an experienced privateer and mercenary, who has hunted many Assassins throughout his career, taking their Hidden Blades as trophies. He is designed to be the nephew of the real-life French privateer Jean-Baptiste Du Casse, who the character is heavily based on. In 1715, du Casse meets Edward Kenway in Havana while the latter is posing as Duncan Walpole, and gives him a pair of Hidden Blades before being inducted into the Templar Order by Grand Master Laureano de Torres y Ayala alongside Edward and Woodes Rogers. Du Casse has his own personal hideout in Great Inagua from where he runs his smuggling business, providing the Templars with various goods, and where he is ultimately assassinated by Edward, who later assumes control of his hideout.

=== Laurens Prins ===
Laurens Prins (1630s – 27 April 1717) (voiced by Christian Rodska), often anglicized as Laurence Prince, was a Dutch buccaneer, privateer, and officer who served under Captain Henry Morgan. He and John Morris led one of the columns against Panama in 1671. In the game, an elderly Prins is depicted as a successful slave trader and an associate of the Templar Order. In 1716, with the approval of Jamaican governor Archibald Hamilton, Prins expands his slavery operations to Mexico, providing him with British soldiers as bodyguards, where he attempts to capture several Assassins at their hideout in Tulum, but the attack is thwarted by Edward Kenway and Mary Read. In 1717, after learning that Laureano de Torres y Ayala is seeking Bartholomew Roberts, whom Prins had recently employed, the latter decides to meet with Torres in Kingston so that he could sell Roberts to him. However, he is assassinated by Edward inside his estate before he can do so.

=== Peter Chamberlaine ===
Peter Chamberlaine (1660s – 22 July 1718) (voiced by Sean Pertwee) is a British Commodore assigned to fight piracy in the West Indies alongside Woodes Rogers. In 1718, he accompanies Rogers to the Pirate Republic of Nassau to offer the King's Pardon to any pirate willing to retire. Chamberlaine has his men blockade Nassau's port, but secretly plans to destroy all the docked ships to prevent any pirate from escaping. Learning about Chamberlaine's plan, Edward Kenway assassinates him aboard his own ship, in order to escape from Nassau alongside Charles Vane.

=== El Tiburón ===
El Tiburón (English: The Shark; died August 1722) is Laureano de Torres y Ayala's mute and heavily armored bodyguard. While not a Templar himself, his unwavering loyalty to Torres nonetheless makes him a valuable asset to the Order. In 1722, after Edward is lured into a trap at the Castillo San Salvador de la Punta in Havana with a decoy of Torres, El Tiburón ambushes him, but is ultimately slain by the Assassin, who manages to use his pistols to penetrate El Tiburón's armor.

=== Lucia Márquez ===
Lucia Márquez (1689 – 1716) is a Spanish thief, the daughter of the privateer and Templar Alejandro Ortega de Márquez. Forced to grow on the streets due to her father's continuous absence and eventual death, she was eventually inducted into the Templar Order after attempting to steal from a high-ranking Templar. By 1716, Lucia has become a high-ranking Templar herself, being given one of five unique Templar keys to guard. After Edward Kenway compromises the West Indies Assassins' hideouts in 1715, Lucia is sent to attack the Assassin bureau on the Cayman Islands, led by Opía Apito. However, Edward, wishing to make amends for his actions and also seeking the Templar key in Lucia's possession, helps Opía defend the bureau and assassinate Lucia.

=== Kenneth Abraham ===
Kenneth Abraham (1675 – 1716) is a British officer and member of the West Indies Rite of the Templar Order during the early 18th century. From 1705, he started to quickly ascend through the Order's ranks as he did through the British Army's, and was eventually trusted with guarding one of five unique Templar keys. After Edward Kenway compromises the West Indies Assassins' hideouts in 1715, Abraham is tasked with eliminating the Maroon Assassins, a faction of Assassins based in Kingston, and enters a long-standing conflict with the local Assassin bureau leader, Antó. In 1716, Edward, wishing to make amends for his actions and also seeking the Templar key in Abraham's possession, helps Antó defend the bureau and assassinate Abraham.

=== Hilary Flint ===
Hilary Flint (1682 – 1717) is an English member of the West Indies Rite of the Templar Order during the early 18th century. Born into an aristocratic family, Flint became the black sheep of the family from a young age, and was sent by his parents to military school, hoping that it would mold him into a more socially acceptable form. After graduation, he became acquainted with the Templars and was eventually inducted into the Order, rising through its ranks to become a valuable member and be trusted with one of five unique Templar keys to guard. After Edward Kenway compromises the West Indies Assassins' hideouts in 1715, Flint is sent to attack the Assassin bureau in Havana, entering a long-standing feud with its leader, the Assassin Rhona Dinsmore, whom he secretly becomes attracted to. In 1717, Edward, wishing to make amends for his actions and also seeking the Templar key in Flint's possession, helps Rhona defend the bureau and assassinate Flint.

=== Jing Lang ===
Jing Lang (1686 – 1717) is a Chinese pirate, the self-proclaimed "Queen of Pirates," and a member of the West Indies Rite of the Templar Order during the early 18th century. She is loosely based on Ching Shih, a Chinese pirate leader from the early 19th century. Originally a Chinese diplomat, a regime change later forced Jing to flee the country and pursue a career in piracy, though she nonetheless continued to further the Templars' goals, for which she was eventually given one of five unique Templar keys to guard. After Edward Kenway compromises the West Indies Assassins' hideouts in 1715, Jing is sent to attack the Assassin bureau in Nassau, where she meets Vance Travers, the brother of the bureau leader Upton Travers. Concealing her identity as a Templar and taking advantage of Vance's romantic feelings for her, Jing manipulates him into trying to kill Upton so that he could steal his piece of a treasure map the brothers had found and run away with her. Vance almost tricks Edward, who had come to make amends for his actions and to retrieve the Templar key in Jing's possession, into doing the deed for him, but Edward is able to realize the deception in time. He then helps Upton kill Jing, as well as Vance for his betrayal.

== Characters of Assassin's Creed Freedom Cry ==
=== Adéwalé ===
Adéwalé (1692 – 1758) (voiced by Tristan D. Lalla) is the protagonist of Assassin's Creed Freedom Cry, who also appears as a supporting character in Assassin's Creed IV: Black Flag and Assassin's Creed Rogue, as well as other works within the franchise. He is an African slave-turned-pirate and eventual Assassin of the West Indies Brotherhood who dedicates himself to liberating slaves and assisting the Maroons, all the while furthering the Assassin cause. Born on a sugar plantation in Trinidad, Adéwalé escaped slavery in 1708 by joining a pirate crew who attacked the plantation, and sailed with them for several years, until his capture by the Spanish authorities in 1715. Adéwalé meets Edward Kenway while they are both in captivity, and the two work together to escape and steal a Spanish brig, which Edward renames the Jackdaw. Adéwalé then serves as Edward's quartermaster aboard the Jackdaw for several years, until becoming disillusioned with the pirate lifestyle and leaving to join the Assassins, though he and Edward remain good friends. In Freedom Cry, set in 1735, Adéwalé temporarily abandons his Assassin duties to aid the Maroon movement in the French colony of Saint-Domingue, where he meets the future mother of his child, Bastienne Josèphe. During the events of Rogue in the 1750s, Adéwalé travels to Port-au-Prince to offer aid following a devastating earthquake, and meets his son, Babatunde, for his first time, recruiting him to the Assassins. Adéwalé later travels to the American Colonies to help the Colonial Brotherhood during the French and Indian War, until his death in 1758 at the hands of the Assassin-turned-Templar Shay Patrick Cormac. Adéwalé is the grandfather of Eseosa, an Assassin who would later play an important role in the Haitian Revolution.

=== Bastienne Josèphe ===
Bastienne Josèphe (1690s – unknown) (voiced by Mariah Inger) is a brothel owner in Port-au-Prince during the early 18th century, and a secret supporter of the Maroon rebellion, for whom she often works as an informant. She is also an affiliate of the Templar Order, who enlist her services as a courier, with Bastienne using the money paid to her by the Templars to liberate more slaves. In 1735, Bastienne meets Adéwalé after the latter is shipwrecked in Saint-Domingue while intercepting a Templar package that was being delivered to her. Adéwalé is initially distrustful of Bastienne due to the latter's Templar affiliations, but agrees to work with her to further the Maroon rebellion, during which time they grow closer. Adéwalé eventually leaves Port-au-Prince in 1737 to return to the Assassins, and gives Bastienne the contents of her package—a Precursor box—though he would later come back and share a night of passion with Bastienne, leading to the eventual birth of their son, Babatunde. Bastienne would pass away at some point before 1776.

=== Augustin Dieufort ===
Augustin Dieufort (1701 – unknown) (voiced by Christian Paul) is the leader of the Maroon rebellion in Saint-Domingue during the early 18th century. From 1735 to 1737, he serves as Adéwalé's quartermaster aboard his ship, the Experto Crede, while the latter is aiding the Maroon movement.

=== Louis Godin ===
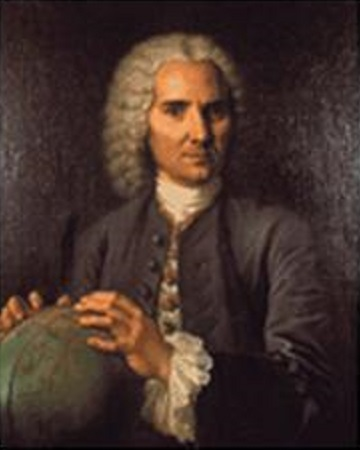
Louis Godin

Louis Godin (28 February 1704 – 11 September 1760) (voiced by Olivier Lamarche) was a French astronomer, geologist, and member of the French Academy of Sciences who took part in the French Geodesic Mission to the Equator. While the expedition was stranded in Port-au-Prince in 1732, Godin fell in love with a local courtesan and misappropriated expedition funds by lavishing her with expensive gifts. Following his return to Port-au-Prince in 1735, Godin meets with the governor of Saint-Domingue, Pierre, Marquis de Fayet, and tries to convince him to provide more funding and a ship for the expedition. Although aware that Godin embezzled the money that had been originally given to him, de Fayet nonetheless agrees to his request, as the success of the expedition would make the slave trade more efficient. Before Godin's departure, Adéwalé secretly infiltrates the expedition and replaces its illiterate slaves with literate Maroons, so that the Maroons and Assassins could also learn about any discoveries made during the expedition.

=== Pierre, Marquis de Fayet ===
Pierre, marquis de Fayet (1675 – 8 July 1737) (voiced by Marcel Jeannin) is the maint antagonist of Assassin's Creed Freedom Cry. He was a French aristocrat and naval commander who served as Governor General of Saint-Domingue from 1732 to 1737. In the game, de Fayet is portrayed as a vile and ruthless governor who despises slaves, seeing them as subhuman and incapable of self-governance. When Adéwalé begins to aid the Maroon rebellion in 1735, freeing numerous slaves, de Fayet retaliates by severely punishing the still-imprisoned slaves to discourage future Maroon attacks. Adéwalé eventually decides to put an end to the brutality and assassinates the governor in Port-au-Prince in 1737. Despite being warned by Bastienne Josèphe that another tyrant will simply take de Fayet's place, Adéwalé believes that his death will give hope to both the Maroons and the imprisoned slaves.

== Characters of Assassin's Creed Rogue ==
=== Shay Cormac ===
Shay Patrick Cormac (12 September 1731 – unknown) (voiced by Steven Piovesan) is the protagonist of Assassin's Creed Rogue. He is an Irish-Canadian Assassin of the Colonial Brotherhood who was recruited in 1747 by his best friend, Liam O'Brien. Shay is an experienced sailor, having accompanied his father at sea several times before the latter's death, and later becomes the captain of his own ship, the Morrigan, which he steals from the Royal Navy in 1752. During his time as an Assassin apprentice, Shay is disrespected by most of his superiors, and comes to question the Brotherhood's goals and morality after being ordered to eliminate a number of Templars regardless of circumstances. Eventually, after his mission to retrieve a Piece of Eden from Lisbon inadvertently results in a devastating earthquake that destroys the city, Shay completely loses faith in the Assassins and betrays them in 1756. Upon being found by the Templars, he agrees to work with them to stop the Assassins from endangering more innocent lives during the French and Indian War, and is eventually inducted into the Templar Order in 1758. Over the following few years, Shay becomes a skilled Assassin hunter as he kills most of his former allies, helping the Templars purge the Colonial Brotherhood and increase their own influence in the American Colonies. Once most of the Colonial Brotherhood has been eliminated by 1760, Shay is sent to Europe to track down a Precursor box in the Assassins' possession, a mission which would take him over 16 years to complete, as he only manages to retrieve the box in 1776, after killing the Assassin Charles Dorian (the father of Arno Dorian) at the Palace of Versailles.

While Shay makes no further appearances in the Assassin's Creed franchise, he is referenced in the 2016 novel Assassin's Creed: Last Descendants through his grandson Cudgel Cormac, a professional Assassin hunter who continued his grandfather's legacy in protecting the Templar cause during the American Civil War.

=== Liam O'Brien ===
Liam O'Brien (1726 – March 1760) (voiced by Julian Casey) is the secondary antagonist of Assassin's Creed Rogue. Liam is introduced as a senior member of the Colonial Brotherhood of Assassins, the second-in-command of Achilles Davenport, and the childhood best friend of Shay, whom he recruited to the Brotherhood in 1747. In spite of Liam being a few years his elder, Shay formed a brotherly bond with him, even though Liam was wiser and more experienced. During Shay's time as an Assassin, Liam briefly serves as his quartermaster aboard the Morrigan, and is later present for his friend's betrayal and theft of the Voynich manuscript. In 1757, Liam assassinates the Templar George Monro to recover the manuscript, allowing the Assassins to use it in conjunction with their Precursor box to discover the locations of a number of Isu temples. It is during this time that Liam learns of Shay's survival (having thought him to be dead after being shot by Chevalier de la Vérendrye) and defection to the Templars, and he comes to despise Shay for killing a number of Assassins who had once been his friends. In 1760, Liam accompanies Achilles to the Arctic Ocean to investigate an Isu temple, leading to a confrontation with Shay and Haytham Kenway. Liam battles his former friend and is mortally wounded after falling from a cliff. With his dying words, he questions Shay's motives for betraying the Assassins and joining their worst enemies, with Shay replying that he did it to save the world, leading Liam to sardonically say that he hopes the world the Templars will build is a good one.

=== Hope Jensen ===
Hope Jensen (1732 – October 1759) (voiced by Patricia Summersett) is a member of the Colonial Brotherhood of Assassins operating in North America during the French and Indian War. Born to a modest family in New York, Hope was adopted by a wealthy German couple after her biological parents' death, though her adoptive father would soon disappear under mysterious circumstances while her adoptive mother fell prey to a deadly illness. Forced to live on the streets, Hope vowed to never depend on anyone ever again and became a thief, eventually meeting Achilles Davenport in 1746, who was impressed by her skills and strong will and recruited her to the Assassins. Within the Brotherhood, Hope leads several gangs that control most of New York's organized crime, thus providing the Assassins with an effective information network. She is also one of Shay's instructors, and is disappointed by his stubbornness that she feels hinders his potential. Following Shay's betrayal of the Brotherhood and defection to the Templars, he works to reduce Hope's control over New York's underworld, believing that her gangs pose a threat to the safety of the city's population, and eventually manages to assassinate her in 1759, after manipulating the British Army into attacking her mansion to draw her out.

=== Kesegowaase ===
Kesegowaase (1730 – 3 November 1757) (voiced Danny Blanco-Hall) is a Maliseet member of the Colonial Brotherhood of Assassins. At a young age, he served the French Army as a mercenary along with other members of his tribe. After meeting Achilles Davenport and Liam O'Brien, who were fighting for the French on behalf of the Brotherhood, he joined the Assassins in 1746, and later became one of Shay's instructors, teaching him the finer points of hunting and crafting. Through Kesegowaase, the Brotherhood would gain allies within nearly every French-aligned Native American tribe. After the outbreak of the French and Indian War, Kesegowaase and Liam are tasked with eliminating the Templar George Monro, but after failing to kill him during the Siege of Fort William Henry, the former rallies his men and attacks Albany, New York. While Liam successfully assassinates Monro, Kesegowaase fights and is killed by Shay, who had betrayed the Assassins and joined to the Templars.

=== Chevalier de la Vérendrye ===
Louis-Joseph Gaultier, Chevalier de la Vérendrye (9 November 1717 – 1760) (voiced by Marcel Jeannin), or simply Chevalier de la Vérendrye, was a French-Canadian fur trader and explorer. In the game, he is depicted as a member of the Colonial Brotherhood of Assassins, who constantly behaves in a cantankerous and hostile manner towards Shay. Following Shay's betrayal of the Brotherhood and theft of the Voynich manuscript, de la Vérendrye does not hesitate to shoot him, believing Shay to be dead after he falls off a cliff. In 1760, de la Vérendrye acts as a decoy to lead the Templars away from Achilles Davenport and Liam O'Brien while the two head to the Arctic Ocean to investigate an Isu temple. After de la Vérendrye and his fleet are cornered by the Templars off the coast of Newfoundland, Shay, who had survived his fall and went on to join the Templars, boards his ship, Le Gerfaut, and mortally wounds him in battle. After de la Vérendrye reveals the deceit, Shay angrily throws him overboard to his death.

=== Le Chasseur ===
Le Chasseur (died 1756) (voiced by Chimwemwe Miller) is a French spy and smuggler operating in New York and the North Atlantic during the French and Indian War. He is also an ally of the Colonial Assassins, supplying them with intelligence he learned from his contacts. By 1756, he serves as the commander of Fort La Croix near Albany, New York. He is tasked with delivering poisonous gases to the Assassin-allied gangs of New York, where they would be used against colonial authorities. However, the fort is attacked by the Templars, and Le Chasseur is killed by Shay to prevent him from reporting his survival to the Assassins, who thought Shay to be dead.

=== George Monro ===
George Monro (1700 – 3 November 1757) (voiced by Graham J. Cuthbertson) was a Lieutenant-Colonel of the British Army during the French and Indian War. In the game, he is depicted as a high-ranking member of the Templar Order, who genuinely believes in helping the population of the American Colonies, and authorizes Shay's rescue from the sea after the latter is left for dead by the Assassins in 1756. Shay repays the favor by assisting Monro in various activities, such as purging Assassin-allied gangs who are terrorizing New York, and reinforcing Monro's troops in the aftermath of the Siege of Fort William Henry. In 1757, he is killed by the Assassin Liam O'Brien during an attack on Albany, New York, in order to retrieve the Voynich manuscript that was given to him by Shay. Monro's death motivates Shay to formally join the Templar Order and continue to defend the Templar cause in his stead.

=== Christopher Gist ===
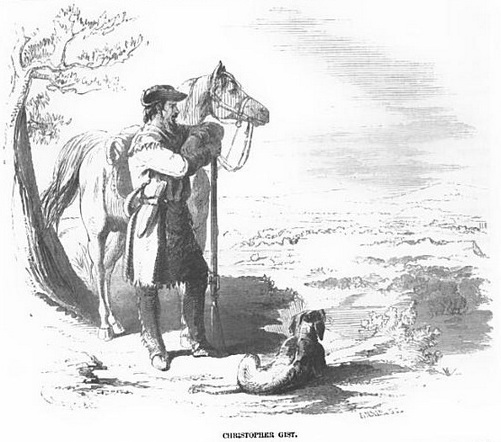
Drawing of Christopher Gist

Christopher Gist (1706 – unknown) (voiced by Richard M. Dumont) was an explorer, surveyor, and frontiersman active in North America during the 18th century. He is best known for providing the first detailed description of the Ohio Country and for his association with George Washington during the French and Indian War. In the game, Gist is a member of the Templar Order who is rescued by Shay at George Monro's request in 1756, and subsequently serves as Shay's first mate on his flagship, the Morrigan. Although most historical records describe Gist as dying from smallpox in the summer of 1759, in the game he is shown surviving beyond this date.

=== James Cook ===
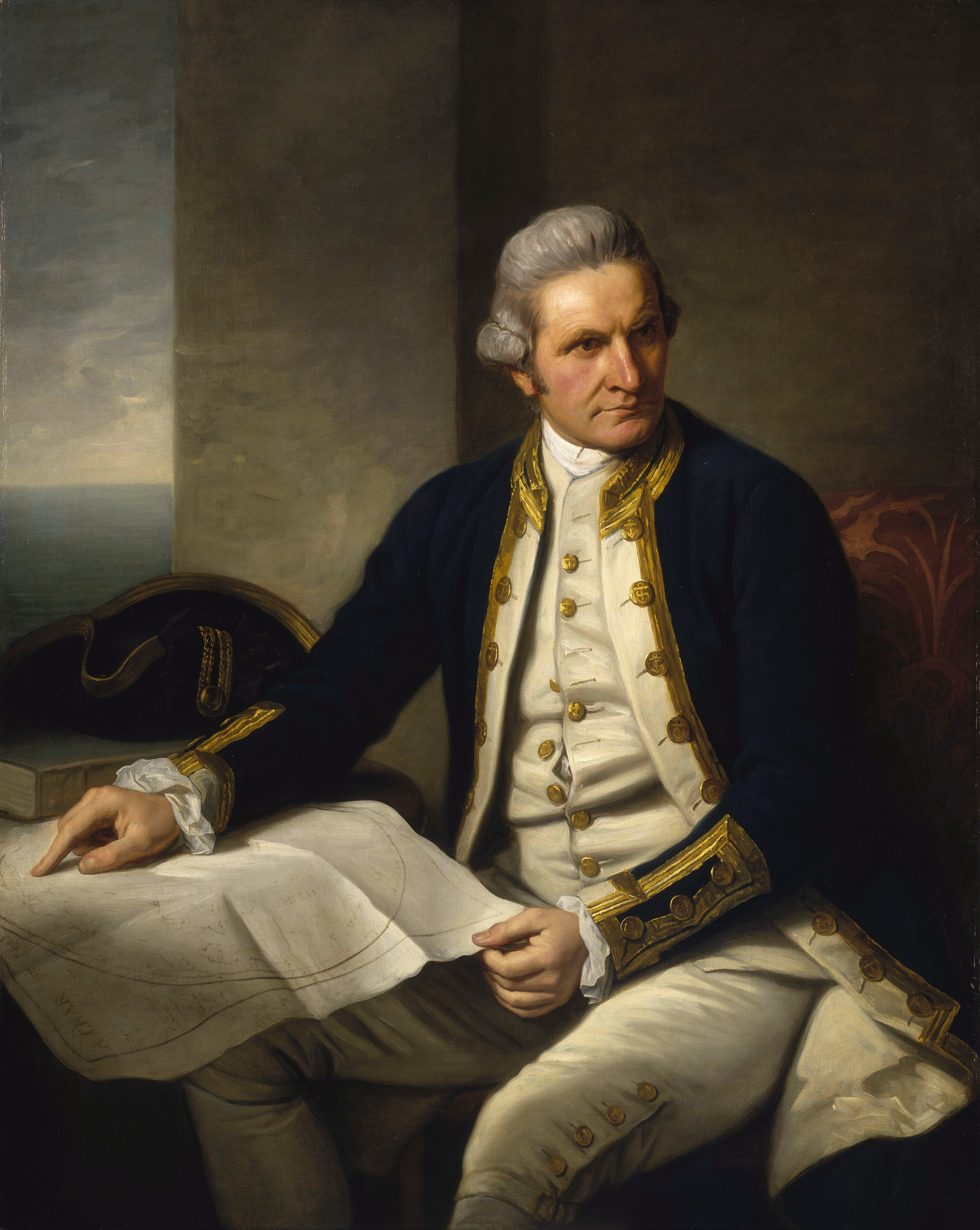
Portrait of James Cook by Nathaniel Dance-Holland, c. 1775

James Cook (7 November 1728 – 14 February 1779) (voiced by Shawn Campbell) was a British explorer, cartographer and naval officer. He is famous for his three voyages between 1768 and 1779 in the Pacific Ocean and to New Zealand and Australia in particular, achieving the first recorded European contact with the eastern coastline of Australia and the Hawaiian Islands, and the first recorded circumnavigation of New Zealand. In the game, Cook is depicted as a captain of the Royal Navy and master of HMS Pembroke during the French and Indian War, and an unwitting ally of the Templar Order. He provides assistance to Shay and Haytham Kenway during their campaigns against the French, and is oblivious to the true nature of the Assassin-Templar conflict, as the Templars opt to keep him in the dark regarding their Order's existence, believing Cook's character to be too honest to adequately keep secrets. After helping Shay locate and kill Chevalier de la Vérendrye in 1760, Cook takes the latter's maps of Newfoundland, which he would later use during his own expeditions in the area, and is promised a sponsorship to fund his voyages to discover new lands by Haytham, ostensibly on behalf of the British government.

=== Jack Weeks ===
Jack Weeks (1723 – unknown) (voiced by Ralph Prosper) is an African-American member of the British and Colonial Rites of the Templar Order. Born in Albany, New York to escaped Virginian slaves, Weeks was taught from a young age to be independent and to use any opportunity to improve his own conditions. Already an expert thief by the age of ten, he became acquainted with the Templar Christopher Gist while attempting to pickpocket him. Impressed by the boy's skills, Gist took him under his wing, and later introduced him to George Monro, who further mentored Weeks in the Templar ways. When Gist was officially inducted into the Templar Order in 1751, he convinced Monro to induct Weeks as well. Weeks becomes acquainted with Shay following the latter's defection to the Templars, and works with him on several occasions, such as reinforcing Monro's troops following the Siege of Fort William Henry, and staging a heist in New York while disguised as Assassin gang members, to manipulate the British Army into helping them bring down Hope Jensen's gangs. Weeks is an ancestor of James Weeks, the founder of Weeksville, Brooklyn.

=== Lawrence Washington ===
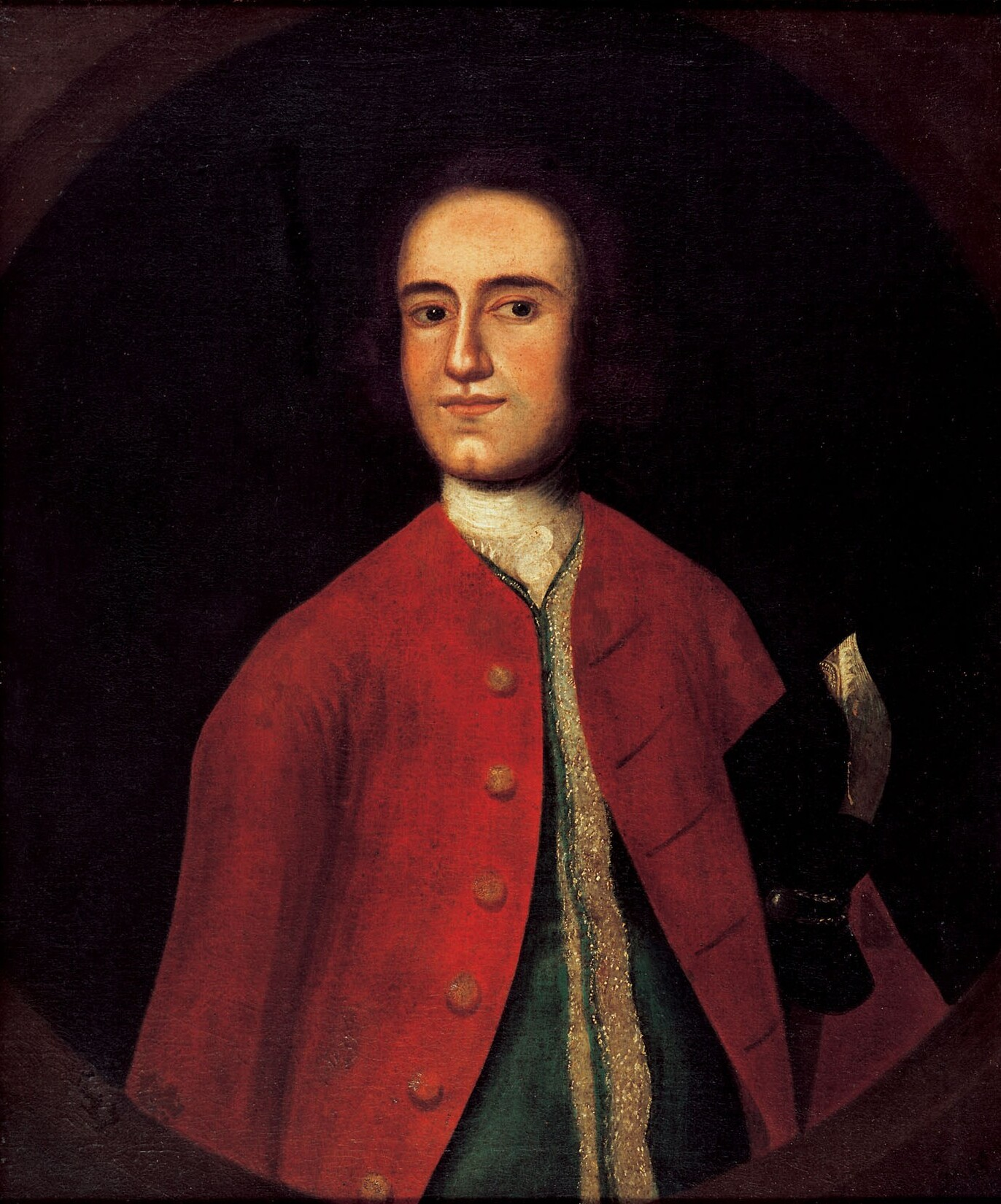
Portrait of Lawrence Washington, c. 1738

Lawrence Washington (1718 – July 1752) (voiced by Harry Standjofski) was an American soldier, planter, politician, and prominent landowner in colonial Virginia, as well as a founding member of the Ohio Company and the older half-brother of George Washington. In the game, he is portrayed as a member of the British Rite of the Templar Order, who was sent to help establish a presence for the Order in the American Colonies, several years before Haytham Kenway's arrival and eventual foundation of the Colonial Rite. Despite his prominent role in the Order, Lawrence wishes to keep his family in the dark regarding his affiliations, especially George, as he asks his Templar associates to spare his brother from any Templar business. In 1751, while visiting the Caribbean to treat his tuberculosis, Lawrence discovers the hideout of the Saint-Domingue Brotherhood of Assassins, led by François Mackandal, after one of Mackandal's apprentices inadvertently triggers a devastating earthquake while attempting to retrieve a Piece of Eden. From Mackandal's camp, Lawrence is able to steal two Isu artifacts—the Precursor box and the Voynich manuscript—which he later gives to his fellow Templars Samuel Smith and James Wardrop during a garden party at Mount Vernon in July 1752. Lawrence is the first assassination target of Shay, who kills him on Achilles Davenport's orders during the party, although Shay is later left to ponder whether Lawrence's murder was truly necessary, as the man was already dying from tuberculosis.

=== Samuel Smith ===
Samuel Smith (died May 1754) (voiced by Alain Goulem) is a member of the British Rite of the Templar Order, operating in and around the Thirteen Colonies during the mid-18th century. He is the treasurer of the Templars in the colonies, and is tasked by Lawrence Washington to safeguard the Precursor box stolen from the Assassins. After Shay assassinates Lawrence in 1752, Smith leaves for Europe, where he intends to activate the box with the help of the continent's various scientists, but he is unsuccessful. Two years later on his return trip to America, he is hunted down by Shay, who eventually kills him on Terra Nova and recovers the box.

=== James Wardrop ===
James Wardrop (c. 1705 – July 1754) (voiced by Vincent Hoss-Desmarais) is a merchant, politician, and member of the British Rite of the Templar Order in the years leading up to the French and Indian War. Operating along the Thirteen Colonies, Wardrop is given the Voynich manuscript to protect by Lawrence Washington, which can be used to translate the contents of the Precursor box. After Shay kills Lawrence in 1752 and later recovers the box from Samuel Smith in 1754, he travels to Albany, New York during the Albany Congress, where he assassinates Wardrop inside Fort Frederick and recovers the manuscript.

=== The Finnegans ===
Barry (voiced by Michel Perron) and Cassidy Finnegan (voiced by Stéfanie Buxton) are an elderly Irish couple residing in New York during the mid-18th century, whose son was a Templar agent until his death under unknown circumstances at some point before 1756. After rescuing Shay from the sea, George Monro asks the Finnegans to nurse him back to health. Following his recovery, Shay repays the favor by defending the Finnegans' household when it is broken into by several Assassin gang members attempting to extort them. Before Shay leaves, the Finnegans gift him their late son's Templar outfit.

=== Onatah ===
Onatah (voiced by Susan Glover) is the clan mother of the Oneida village of Orenda during the mid-18th century. In 1757, the Assassin Kesegowaase has his men hold the village hostage to prevent them from siding with the British, but they are rescued by Shay. As a sign of gratitude, Onatah tells Shay about the Oneida legend of the Sky Woman, and presents him an ancient set of Native American armor, which is locked away and requires Shay to "follow the Sky Woman's path" in order to find all the keys and unlock it.

=== James Gunn ===
Sir James Gunn was a Scottish knight and member of the Templar Order during the 14th century, who is said to have partaken in Henry Sinclair's expedition to the New World in 1398. The expedition is believed to have reached Nova Scotia and Massachusetts. During the 1750s, Gunn's armor and sword are found by Shay, who proceeds to claim them for himself. He is based on the legend of the "Westford Knight," as well as rumors of Henry Sinclair's alleged Templar connections.

== Characters of Assassin's Creed Unity ==
=== Arno Dorian ===
Arno Victor Dorian (26 August 1768 – unknown) is a French-Austrian Assassin who is the main protagonist of Assassin's Creed Unity, and the childhood friend of Élise de La Serre during the French Revolution. He initially joins the Brotherhood of Assassins out of a self-centered desire to seek closure for the death of Elise's father and the man who raised him after he is orphaned as a child. Arno is fully customizable, and his weapons, clothing, and abilities can be changed. He is portrayed by Dan Jeannotte through performance capture. Arno makes a cameo appearance in the 2016 Assassin's Creed film, where he is revealed to be an ancestor of Callum Lynch.

=== Élise de La Serre ===
Élise de La Serre (1768 – 28 July 1794) is a Templar during the French Revolution, and Arno's companion and lover. Élise meets Arno the day his father was killed. Her father, Grand Master de La Serre, takes Arno in and raises him as his ward, allowing Arno and Élise to grow up together. After her father's death she partially blames Arno, as he did not deliver the anonymous warning of the assassination, and they part on bitter terms. After Arno becomes an Assassin, he finds out that the Templar who ordered Élise's father's murder also wants her dead. Arno protects Élise when they reunite. He helps her find François-Thomas Germain, the Templar Sage who wants to rebuild the Templar Order. During the final confrontation between Arno, Élise, and Germain, she is killed, devastating Arno.

=== François de la Serre ===
François de la Serre (1733–1789) is the Grand Master of the Parisian Rite of the Templar Order during the late 18th century. He is Élise's biological father, and Arno's adoptive father. He is a supporter of the absolutist monarchy of the Ancien Régime, and expels his lieutenant, François-Thomas Germain, from the Order for his radical ideas of unseating the aristocracy from power and giving it to the rising middle class. Germain considers de la Serre to be a complacent Grand Master who has forgotten the Templars' true goals, and has him killed in 1789 as part of a coup within the Order.

=== Pierre Bellec ===
Pierre Bellec (voiced by Anthony Lemke) (c. 1740 – 1791) is a French-Canadian Master Assassin and former colonial soldier who is a veteran of the Seven Years' War, and was active during the French Revolution. At some point before the French Revolution, Bellec took a seat on the Assassin Council of the French Brotherhood. Arno Victor Dorian is his student.

=== Victor and Hugo ===
Victor and his brother Hugo are two blacksmiths living in Versailles during the late 18th century. The names of Victor and Hugo are a reference to the French poet and novelist Victor Hugo. Hugo mentions to Arno that he and Victor were imprisoned for stealing a loaf of bread.

=== Le Roi des Thunes ===
Le Roi des Thunes, or The King of Beggars, is the self-claimed king of the Cour des Miracles district. He forces the beggars of the district to pay him tributes, which are taken from rich people would pity them when they feign sickness. He tries to join the Templars under the command of de la Serre, but the latter rejects him, causing le Roi to make a vow to kill him. He is approached by Charles Gabriel Sivert, and joins the radical faction of the Templar order led by Germain. He murders de la Serre during the 1789 coup and is assassinated by Arno two years later.

=== Aloys la Touche ===
Aloys la Touche is the right-hand man and enforcer of Le Roi des Thunes, tasked with collecting the tributes from the beggars and punishing the ones who cannot pay. He is also a Templar under Germain's command, and after Le Roi des Thunes is assassinated by Arno, la Touche is tasked by Templar Maximilien de Robespierre to lead his Reign of Terror in Versailles. He is assassinated by Arno during an execution mass in 1793.

=== Marie Lévesque ===
Marie Lévesque is a wealthy noble and one of Paris' main grain merchants. She is a Templar that supports Germain, and aids him in the coup against de la Serre. After Germain takes over, she is ordered to starve the people to make the revolution more violent and brutal. Her plans are discovered by Arno Dorian, who assassinates her during a lavish party in 1792.

=== Frédéric Rouille ===
Frédéric Rouille is a captain of the Paris military and supporter of Germain. He is a leading figure in the Tenth of August and September Massacres, where he is assassinated by Arno.

=== Olivier ===
Olivier is de la Serre's butler, who expresses sincere disdain for Arno.

=== Jean Lessard ===
Jean Lessard (died 1794) is a Sans-culottes leader in Paris who is rejected by Marie Tussaud. During the revolution, Lessard tries to carry out his revenge against Tussaud, and sends his men to slay her. Tussaud escapes and sends Arno to eliminate Lessard.

=== Denis Molinier ===
Denis Molinier is a French alchemist and a member of the French Templars, tasked with finding Nicolas Flamel's laboratory. Arno plots to find the lab before him, and steals one of his mechanisms, which open Flamel's lab. It is unknown what happened to him afterwards.

=== Marquis de Sade ===
Donatien Alphonse François, Marquis de Sade (voiced by Alex Ivanovici) (2 June 1740 – 2 December 1814), commonly known as the Marquis de Sade, was a French aristocrat, revolutionary politician, philosopher, and author famous for his libertine sexuality.

He becomes the new Roi des Thunes after his predecessor is assassinated by Arno in 1791. He was held prisoner in the Bastille for several years, but is transferred to another prison shortly before angry Parisians storm the stronghold. Three years later, as Arno and Élise hunt Louis-Michel le Peletier, the pair enlist de Sade's knowledge of Parisian politics to find le Peletier's whereabouts.

=== François-Thomas Germain ===
François-Thomas Germain (voiced by Julian Casey) (1726–1794) is a French silversmith, Sage, and Grand Master of the Parisian Rite of the Templar Order during the French Revolution. After experiencing visions of the First Civilization and reading the Codex Pater Intellectus, he takes it upon himself to reform the Order, which he believed had grown corrupt after aligning itself with the aristocracy for centuries. Inspired by Grand Master Jacques de Molay, Germain seeks to carry out the "Great Work" and create a capitalist society in which the Templars could more easily control the populace. De la Serre regards his ideas as being too radical, and exiles him from the Order. Germain turns de la Serre's advisors to his cause, forming a radical faction within the Templar Order. In 1789, he has de la Serre assassinated in the Palace of Versailles, taking most of the Order under his control. As the French Revolution breaks out, Germain and his followers exploit discontent with the monarchy and creates as much chaos as possible to crush the aristocracy and clergy, and instil fear in the populace of rising against the establishment again. The Templars hoard food and frame the royal family, eventually leading to the execution of King Louis XVI in 1793. Under the Templar Maximilien de Robespierre, the Reign of Terror brings the revolution to a violent and chaotic climax. Along the way, Élise opposes Germain. She and Arno eliminate Germain's followers and track him down to the Temple in 1794. After Germain kills Élise with a Sword of Eden, he is killed by Arno. In his final moments, Germain triggers a vision, telling Arno that his goals of reforming society and the Templar Order have already succeeded, even if he would not live to see the results.

=== Honore Gabriel Riqueti ===
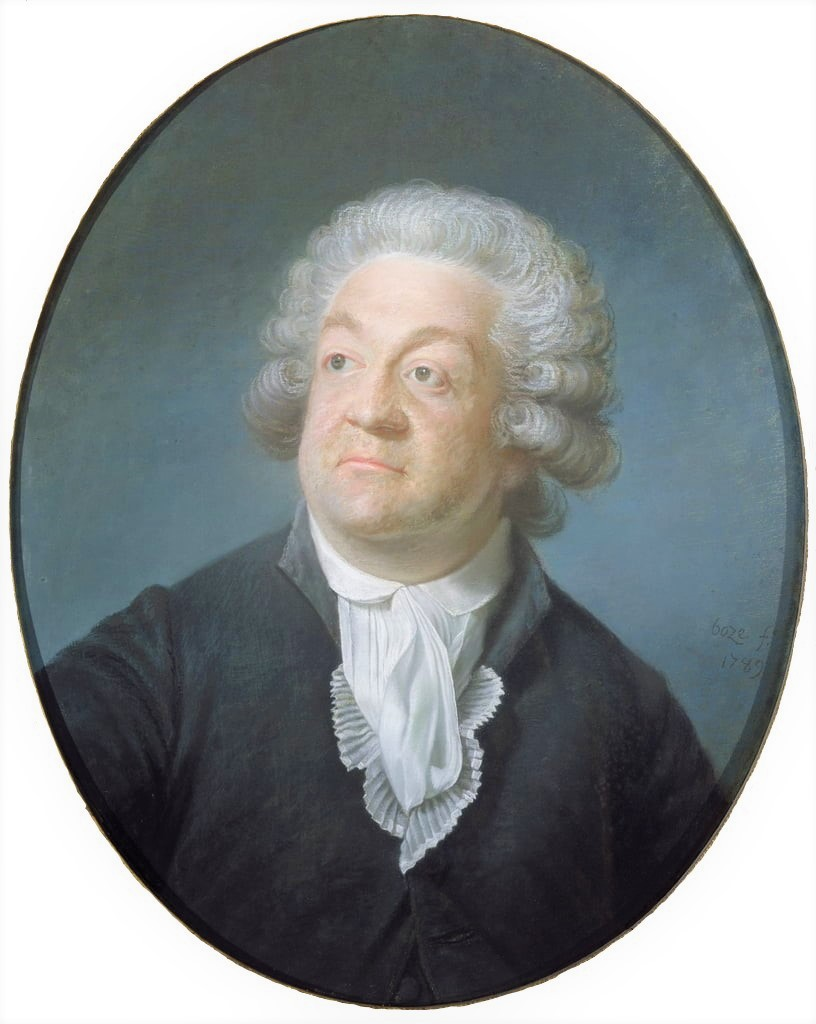
Portrait of Honoré-Gabriel Riqueti, marquis de Mirabeau, by Joseph Boze (1789)

Honoré Gabriel Riqueti, comte de Mirabeau (voiced by Harry Standjofski) (1749–1791), better known as simply Mirabeau, is a French statesman, author, Mentor of the Assassin Council of the French Brotherhood, and leader of the French Revolution during its early stages. He criticizes France's arbitrary justice system and favors a constitutional monarchy built on the model of Great Britain, being a voice of moderation in the National Constituent Assembly. As Mentor of the Council and Brotherhood, Mirabeau seeks to establish peace with the Parisian Rite of the Templar Order and de la Serre, and inducts Arno Dorian into the Brotherhood. After a coup within the Templar Order, he is forced to give up on the truce until Élise offers to work with the Assassins in 1791. Unlike most of the council, he is eager to accept this offer. When he discovers that Mirabeau is a traitor to the Brotherhood, the Assassin Pierre Bellec poisons him. After his death, it is discovered that Mirabeau was serving King Louis XVI as an advisor in exchange for having his debts paid off. Public opinion turns against him, leading to his remains being moved away from the Panthéon. History views him as a complex man who is not easily understood. Pierre's decision to murder Mirabeau has also led subsequent Assassins to debate whether his attempts to reconcile with the Templars conflicted with the ideals of the Brotherhood.

=== Louis XVI ===
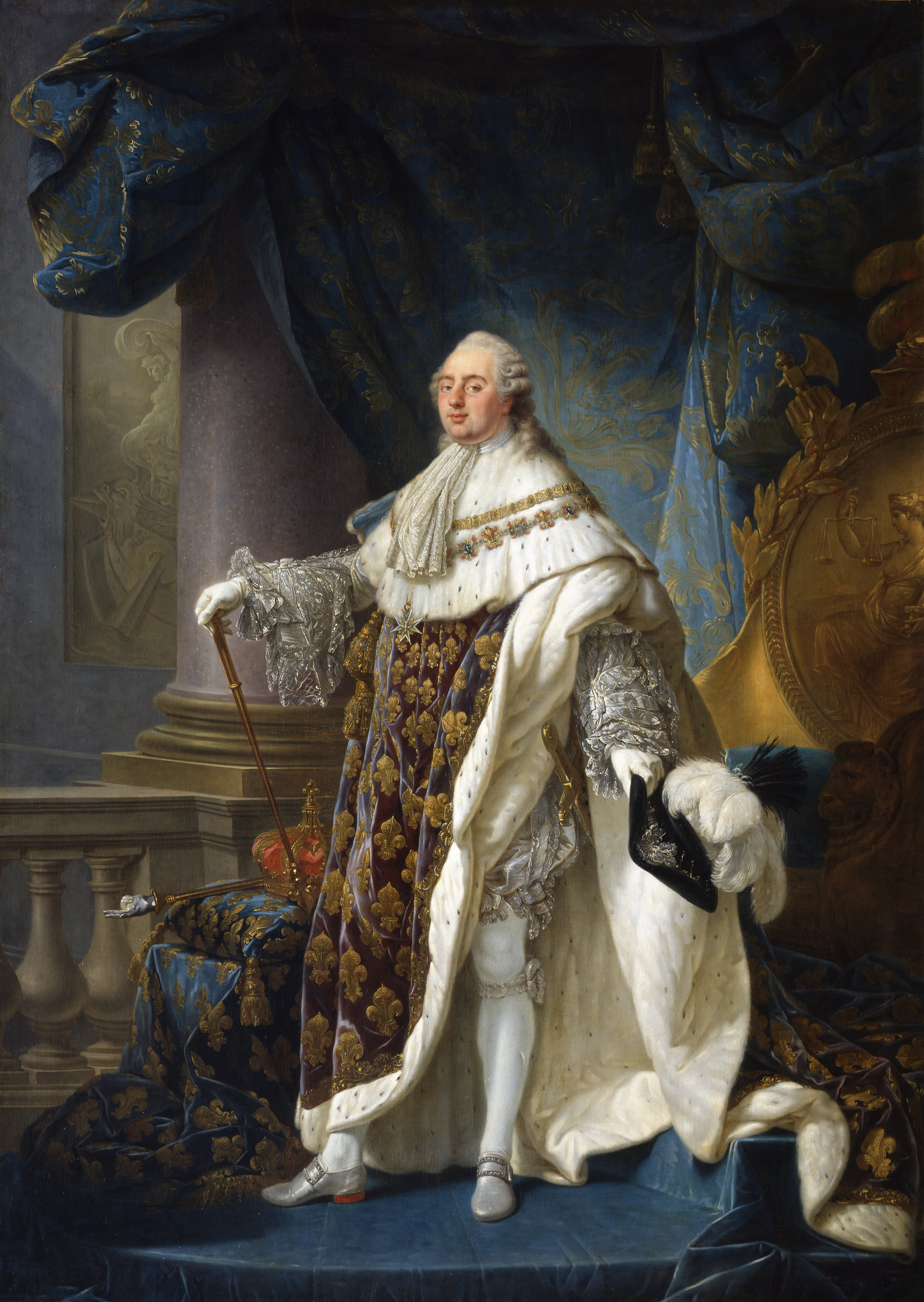
Portrait by Antoine-François Callet

Louis XVI (born Louis Auguste de France, also known as Louis Capet) (1754–1793) was King of France and Navarre from 1774 until 1791, after which he was subsequently King of the French from 1791 to 1792, before his deposition and execution during the French Revolution.

=== Maximilien Robespierre ===
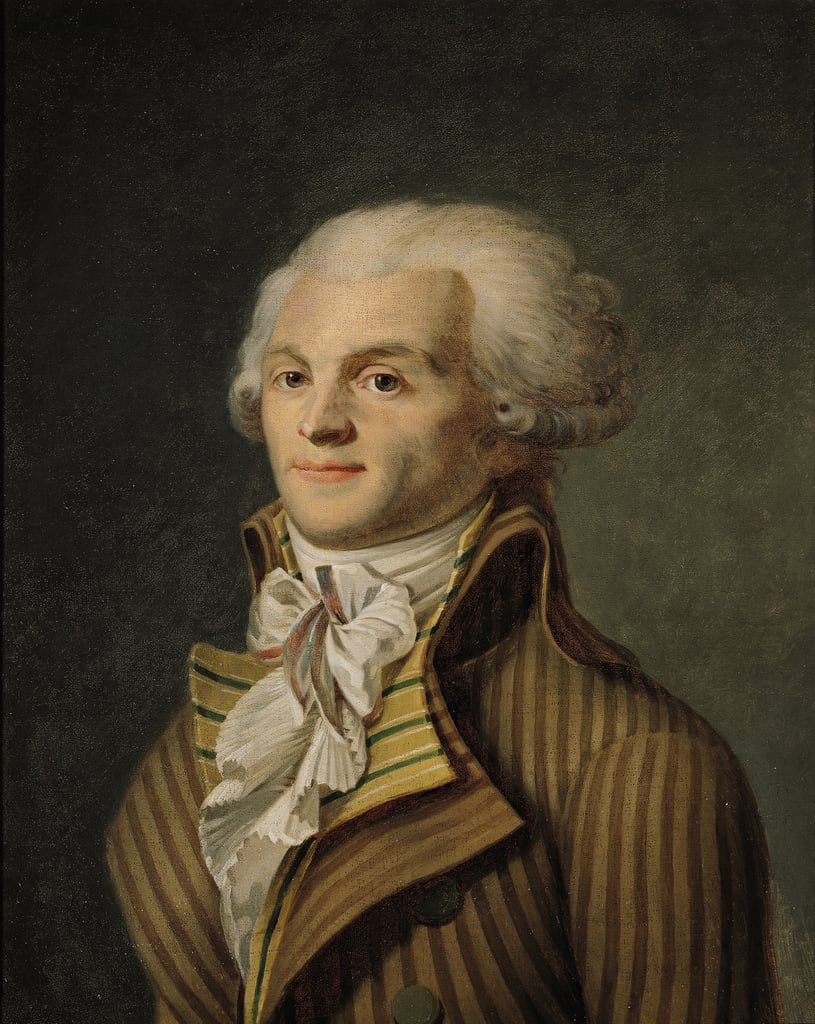
Portrait of Robespierre

Maximilien François Marie Isidore de Robespierre (voiced by Bruce Dunmore) (1758–1794), often known as simply Maximilien Robespierre or Robespierre, is a French lawyer, politician and a member of the Templar Order. He is notable for starting the Reign of Terror during the French Revolution and abolishing slavery in France.

=== Napoléon Bonaparte ===
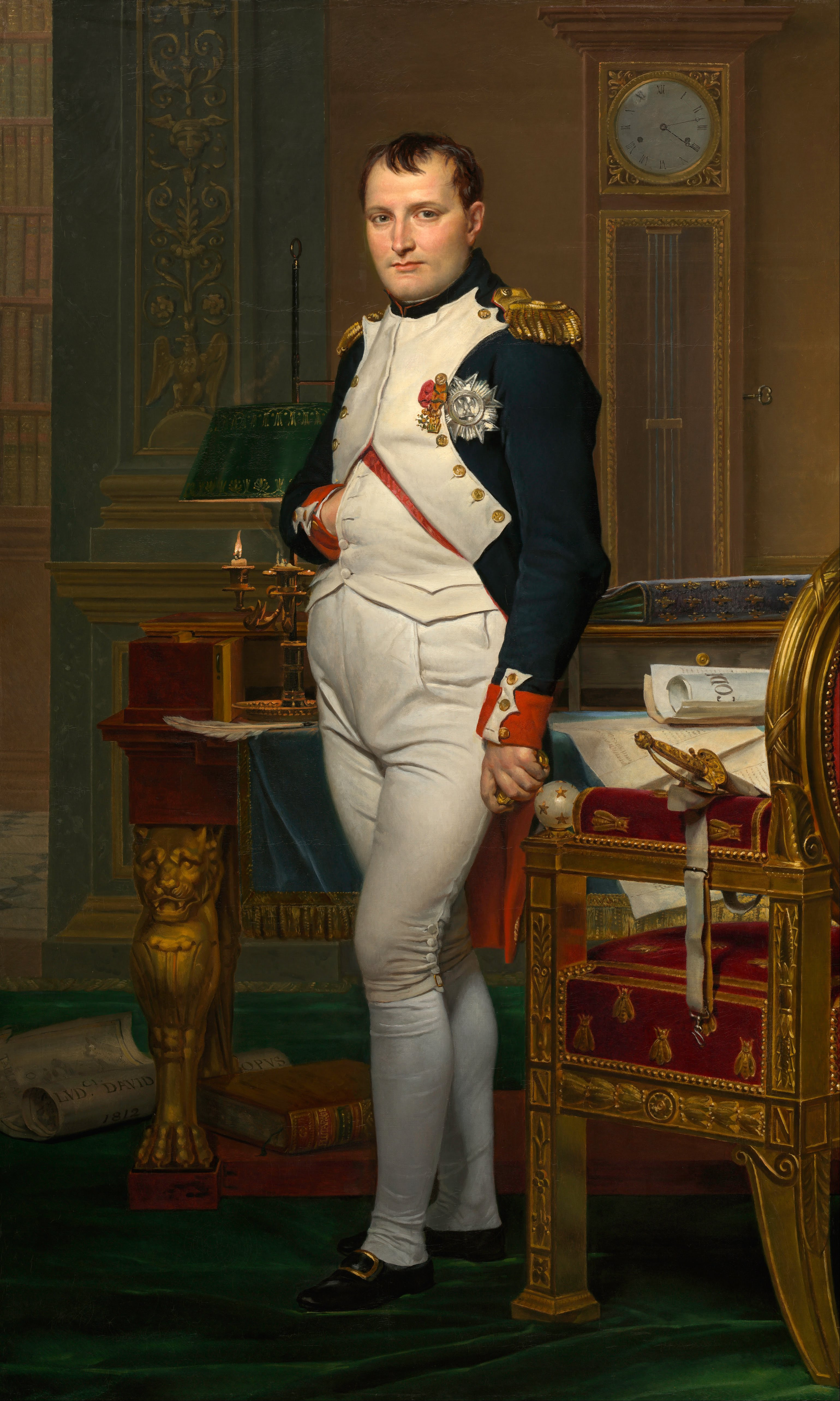
The Emperor Napoleon in His Study at the Tuileries, by Jacques-Louis David, 1812

Napoléon Bonaparte (voiced by Brent Skagford) (1769–1821) was a French military and political leader of Corsican descent who ruled first as the First Consul of France from 1799 to 1804, then as emperor from 1804 to 1815. He rose to power amidst the chaos and political turmoil of the French Revolution.

He is an acquaintance to Arno.

== Characters of Assassin's Creed Syndicate ==
=== Jacob and Evie Frye ===
Jacob Frye (9 November 1847 – unknown) and Evie Frye (9 November 1847 – unknown) are British Assassins who were active in Victorian London. Born at a time when the Assassin presence in London is virtually non-existent, they fight to restore the Assassins to prominence in the city, crippling the Templar presence in the process. Jacob is voiced by Paul Amos, and Evie and is voiced by Victoria Atkin.

=== Lydia Frye ===
Lydia Frye (19 March 1893 – unknown) is a British Assassin operating in London during World War I, crossing paths with Winston Churchill, and is Jacob's granddaughter and Evie's grandniece. She assassinates Templar agents attempting to prolong the war, one of whom was a Sage. She appears within the Helix missions in Assassin's Creed Syndicate.

=== Henry Green ===
Henry Green (7 December 1843 – unknown) is the Indian-born leader of the British Assassins during the late 1860s. Born Jayadeep Mir, the son of Arbaaz Mir, he crosses paths with Evie and Jacob during their liberation of London in 1868, helping them in their final fight against Crawford Starrick and eventually marries Evie. As a child in India, he was trained by the twins' father, Ethan Frye.

=== Crawford Starrick ===
Crawford Starrick (1827–1868) is the owner of Starrick Industries, and the Grand Master of the British Rite of the Templar Order by 1868. He appears in Assassin's Creed Syndicate. As an arrogant individual, he shows great disdain to those who tormented him and sees himself as a ruler among servants. Using his charm, he bends people to his will. After all the members of his inner circle are killed by Jacob and Evie, Crawford goes to the location of the Shroud of Eden, where he is killed by the twins.

=== Lucy Thorne ===
Lucy Thorne (1837–1868) is a Templar and Grand Master Starrick's second-in-command. She is also the Order's expert on Pieces of Eden, and is tasked with finding the legendary Shroud of Eden. After fellow Templar Pearl Attaway is killed by Jacob, Lucy chases the twins for revenge, only to be assassinated by Evie.

=== Maxwell Roth ===
Maxwell Roth (18?? – 1868) is the mastermind behind London's criminal underworld and one of Crawford's lieutenants. Although he is not a Templar, he trains several of Crawford's small-time gang leaders in return for a massive amount of money. After some of Crawford's lieutenants are killed, Maxwell proposes a partnership with Jacob's gang, betraying Crawford and helping Jacob's gangsters free the city. The partnership ends shortly after due to Maxwell's psychopathic behavior. When he intentionally burns down the Alhambra Music Hall, Jacob stabs him with his blade. In his final moments, Maxwell tells Jacob that he carried out the atrocities because he wanted and chose to do so.

=== Pearl Attaway ===
Pearl Attaway is the owner of Attaway transport and, like her cousin, Grand Master Crawford Starrick, is a member of the British Templars. Pearl is business rivals with Malcolm Millner, another Templar. Crawford initially chooses Malcolm as the man controlling the bus transport, due to tensions with Pearl, but after she cooperates with Jacob, who does not know that she was a Templar, Crawford hands over control to her, and they both orchestrate Malcolm's elimination. Jacob discovers Pearl's true colors and kills her in her train station.

=== Rupert Ferris ===
Rupert Ferris is the owner of Ferris Ironworks, a large steel-mill in the city of Croydon near London, effectively controlling the small city with his wealth. He is also one of Crawford's lieutenants. He is killed by Jacob Frye in his factory.

=== Philip Twopenny ===
Philip Twopenny is the governor of the Bank of England and secret a member of the Templar Order. He orchestrates various robberies within the bank to fund the Templars, and in one of the raids, he is assassinated by Jacob with the help of inspector Abberline.

=== Charles Darwin ===
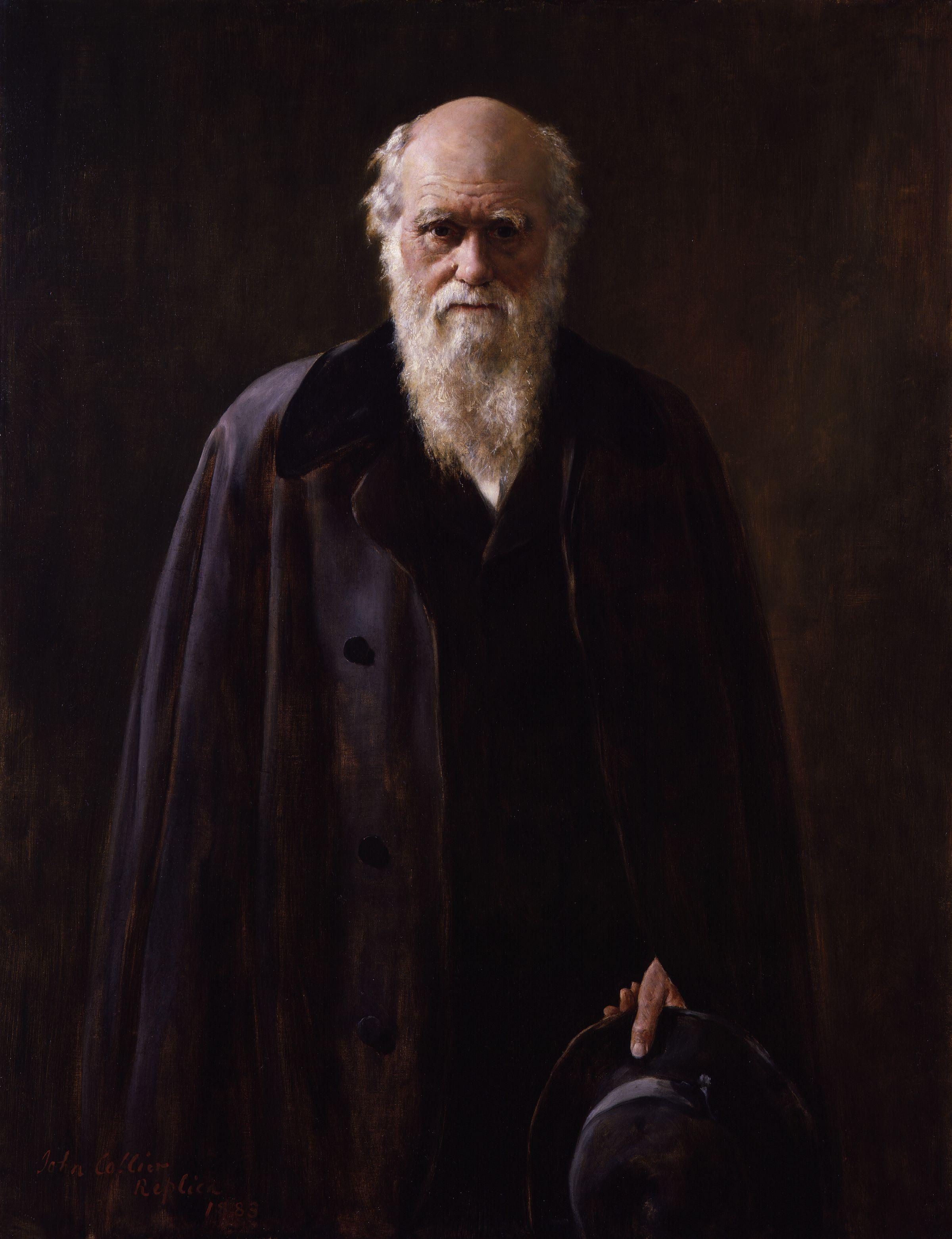
Charles Robert Darwin by John Collier

Charles Darwin, born on 12 February 1809, was best known for his contributions and studies regarding the natural laws of evolution.

At some point, he meets Jacob and Evie.

=== Charles Dickens ===
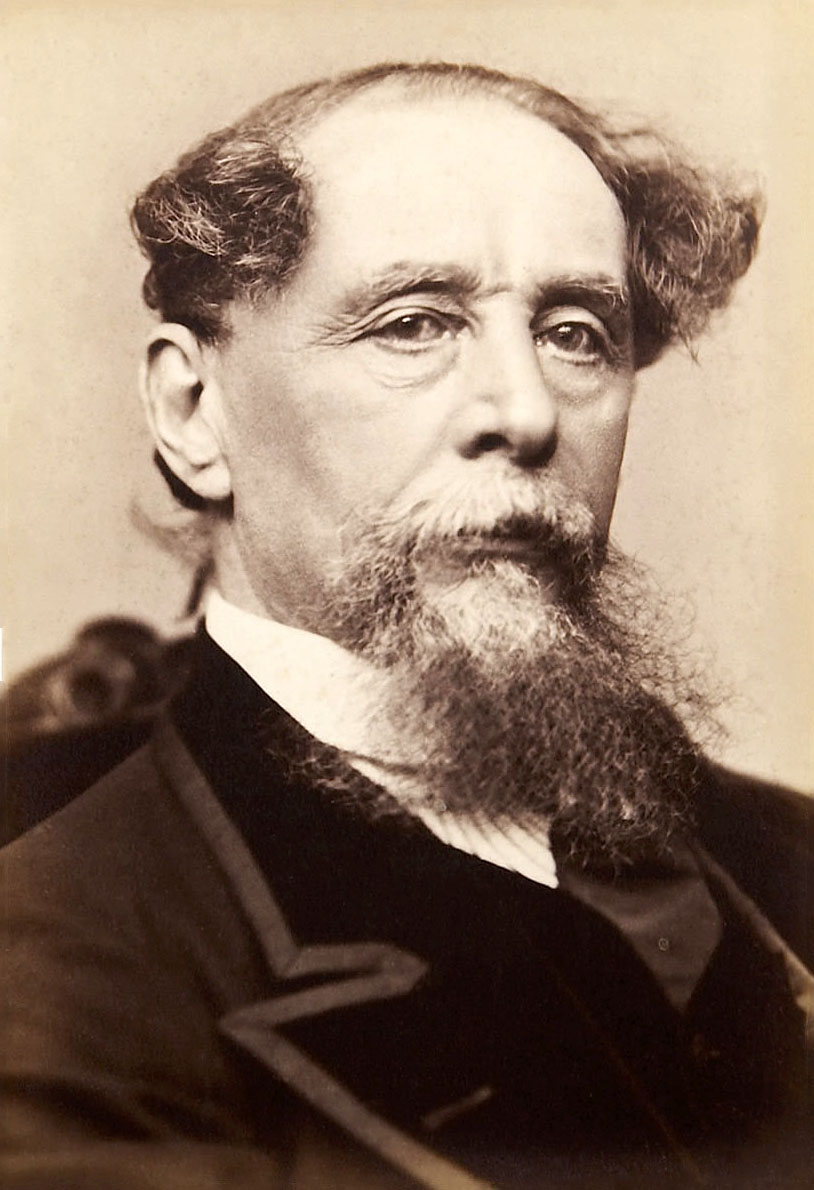
Charles Dickens between 1867 and 1868

Charles Dickens (1812–1870) was an English writer and social critic. He meets Jacob and Evie, and asks for their help in solving crimes.

=== Karl Marx ===
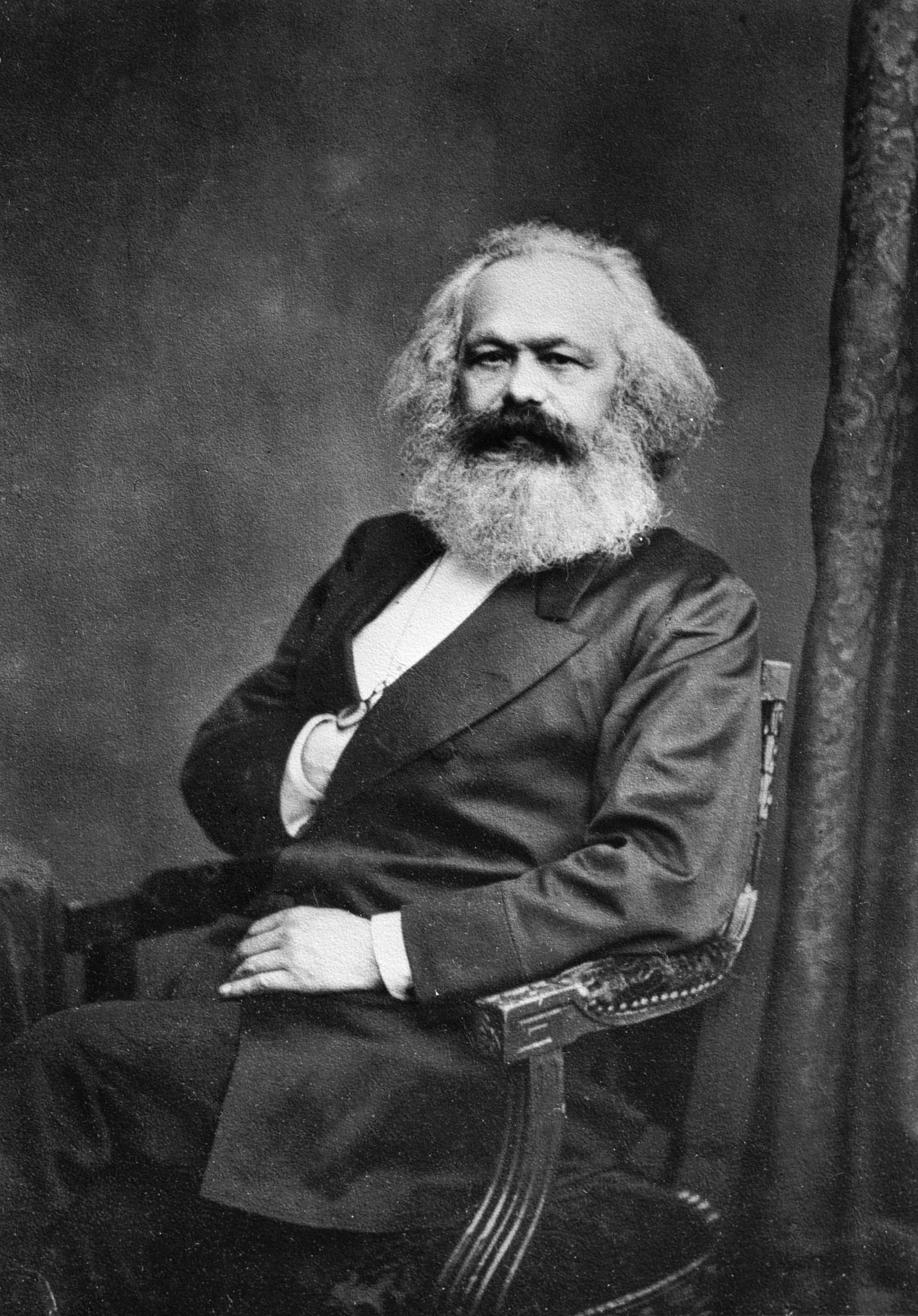
Karl Marx in 1875

Karl Marx (1818–1883) was a German philosopher, economist, communist, sociologist, journalist, and revolutionary socialist. He asks Jacob and Evie to expand his unionistic ideas to the people of London.

=== Arthur Conan Doyle ===
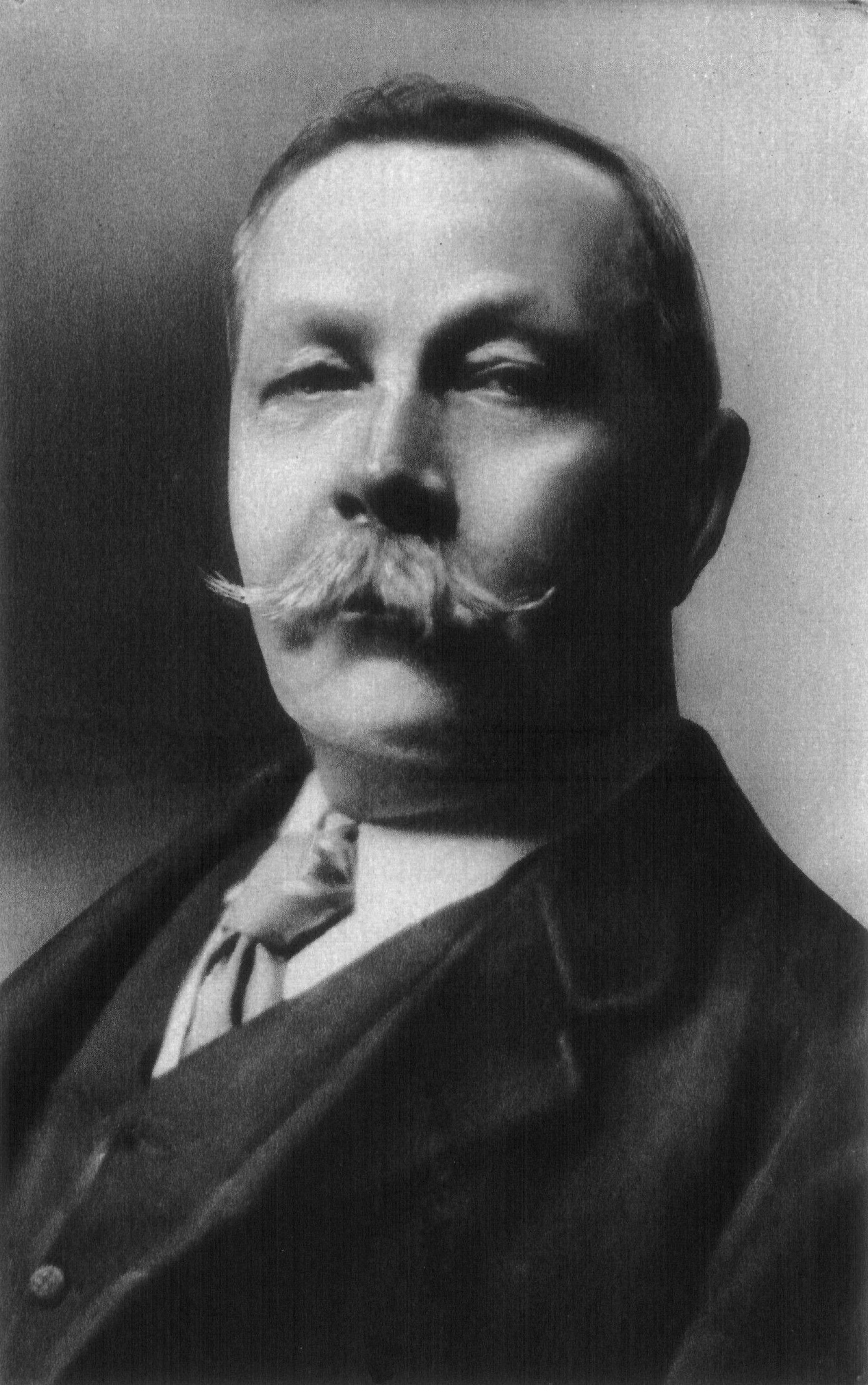
Conan Doyle in 1914 by Arnold Genthe

Sir Arthur Conan Doyle (22 May 1859 – 7 July 1930) was a Scottish writer and physician, famous for his fictional stories about the detective Sherlock Holmes. In 1868, as a young boy, his love for detective stories lead him to team up with the penny dreadful writer Henry Raymond, and Jacob and Evie to solve murders.

=== Alexander Graham Bell ===
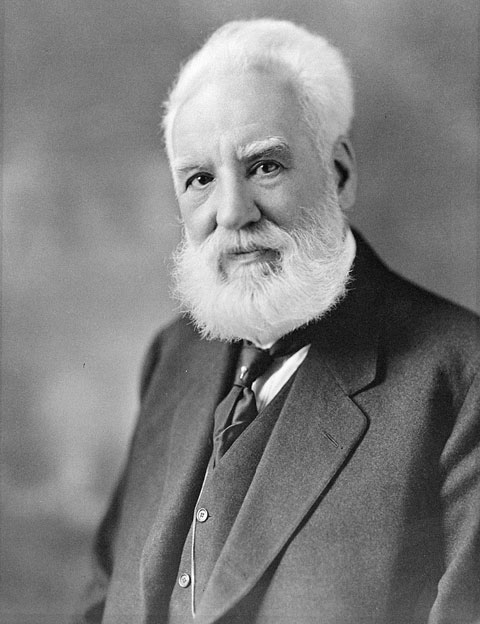
Portrait of Alexander Graham Bell between 1914 and 1919

Alexander Graham Bell (1847–1922) was a Scottish-born scientist, inventor, engineer and innovator who was credited with inventing the first practical telephone. He was on friendly terms with Henry Green, who nicknamed him "Aleck".

=== Queen Victoria ===
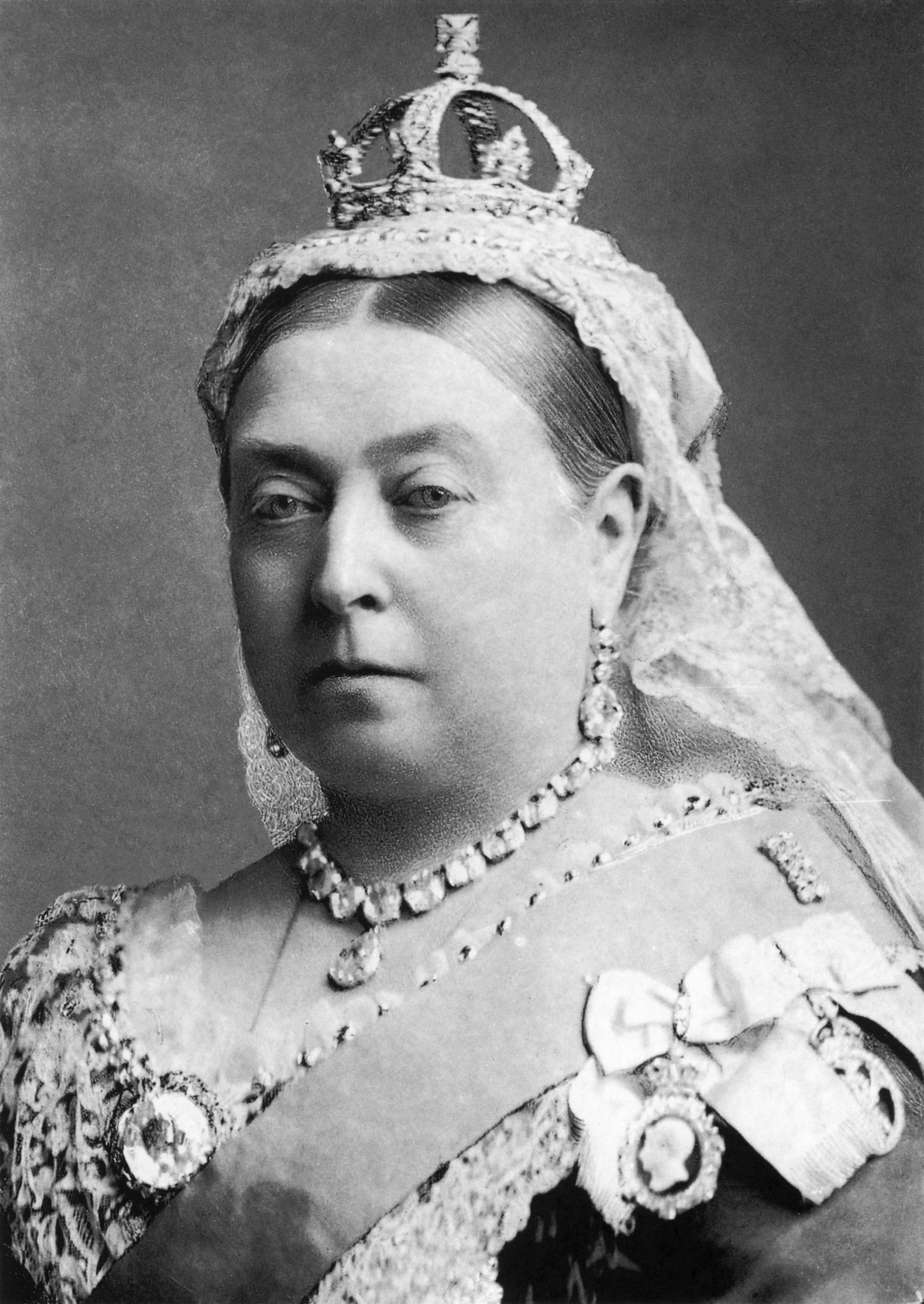
Queen Victoria by Alexander Bassano in 1885

Queen Victoria (1819–1901), born Alexandrina Victoria of Kent, was the Queen of the United Kingdom of Great Britain and Ireland from 1837, and Empress of India from 1876, until her death.

=== Duleep Singh ===
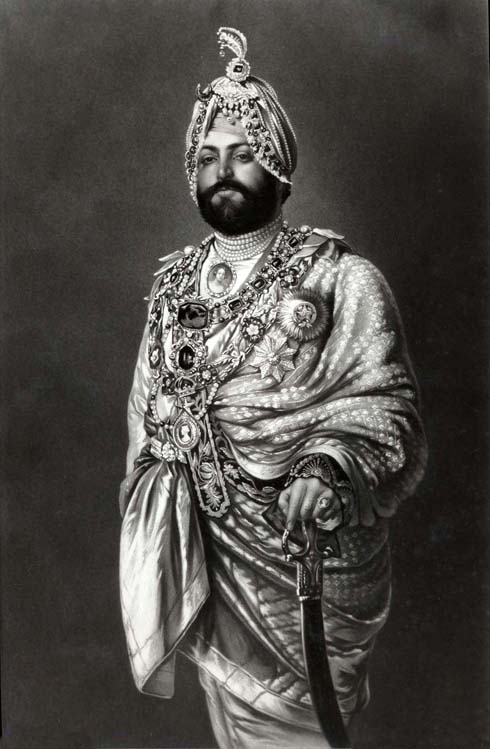
Maharaja Duleep Singh in 1875, oil painting by Capt. Goldingham of London

Duleep Singh (1838–1893), also known as Dalip Singh or the Black Prince of Perthshire, was the last Maharaja of the Sikh Empire and the youngest son of Ranjit Singh, ruling from 1843 to 1846. He is an associate of, and great-uncle to the Assassin Henry Green.

=== Jack the Ripper ===
Jack, formerly known as Jack the Lad during his youth and widely feared as Jack the Ripper, was a member of the British Brotherhood of Assassins, active in the Whitechapel district of London up until 1888. Jack becomes infamous in 1888 following a series of gruesome murders of young women, who are fellow Assassins trying to stop his madness; these murders, in conjunction with Jack's control over London's criminal enterprise, threaten the existence of the Assassins in London. He is killed by Evie.

=== David Brewster ===
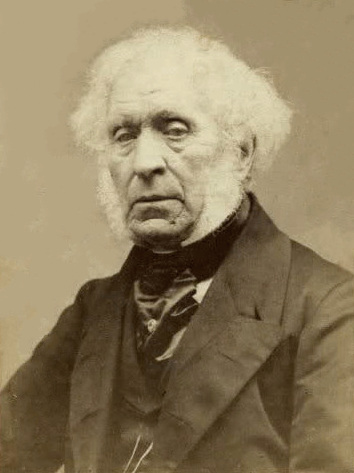
David-Brewster in 1850

David Brewster is a scientist working on a Piece of Eden at the behest of the Templar Order. He is assassinated by Evie, and his experiments on the Piece of Eden grow unstable, resulting in an explosion that buries his underground laboratory.

=== John Elliotson ===
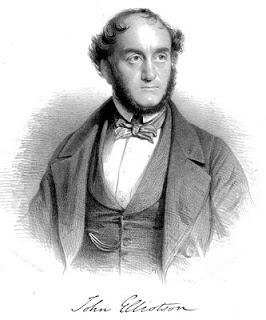
Engraving of John Elliotson in 1838

John Elliotson is a physician working in Lambeth Asylum and an associate of Crawford Starrick. Elliotson creates "Starrick's Soothing Syrup", a highly-addictive tonic made from opium and hallucinogens used to keep the working classes under control. He is assassinated by Jacob Frye, but his death floods the borough of Lambeth with counterfeit medicinal and sub-standard medical care.

=== James Brudenell ===
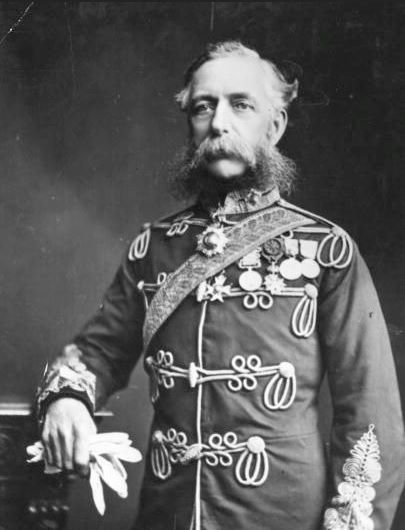
Lieutenant General James Thomas Brudenell, 7th Earl of Cardigan

James Brudenell, 7th Earl of Cardigan is a member of the House of Lords who opposes Benjamin Disraeli and the Corrupt Practices Act as he tries to keep political power in the hands of the nobility.

=== Florence Nightingale ===
Florence Nightingale was an English social reformer, statistician and the founder of modern nursing. She is first encountered by Evie as the latter looks for help to treat Clara O'Dea.

== Characters of Assassin's Creed Chronicles ==
=== Shao Jun ===
Shao Jun (7 November 1505 – unknown) is a member of the Chinese Brotherhood of Assassins during the early 16th century. She is a former concubine of the Zhengde Emperor, and is rescued by the Assassins after the emperor's death. As a result, she devotes her life to the Creed. Shao Jun appears in Assassin's Creed: Embers and Assassin's Creed Chronicles: China. She is voiced by Angela Galuppo in Assassin's Creed: Embers and Annabelle Galea in Assassin's Creed Chronicles: China. Her descendant, the Assassin Lin, portrayed by Michelle H. Lin, is depicted in the 2016 Assassin's Creed film.

=== Arbaaz Mir ===
Arbaaz Mir (early 1800s – unknown) is a member of the Indian Brotherhood of Assassins during the 19th century, active during the time of the war between the Sikh Empire and the East India Company. Arbaaz is Jayadeep's father. He appears in Assassin's Creed Chronicles: India, and is voiced by Johnny Neal.

=== Nikolai Andreievich Orelov ===
Nikolai Andreievich Orelov (late 1800s – 1928) is a member of the Russian Brotherhood of Assassins during the late 19th and early 20th centuries. Nikolai is notably involved in events such as the Borki train disaster and the Tunguska explosion, and spearheads the hunt for the Imperial Sceptre of the Russian royal family with aid from Nikola Tesla. He leaves the Brotherhood out of fear for his and his family's safety and is hunted down by Assassins working for the FBI after he kills one of them in a fit of paranoid madness after they attempt to convince him to return to the Brotherhood with his son, Innokenti. Orelov appears in Assassin's Creed Chronicles: Russia.

== Characters of Assassin's Creed Origins ==
=== Bayek ===
Bayek of Siwa (portrayed by Abubakar Salim) is a Medjay and Assassin operating in the Ptolemaic Kingdom around 49 BCE, who appears in Assassin's Creed Origins. Bayek possesses a symbiotic relationship with the eagle, Senu, which allows him to see the world through its eyes—a more literal predecessor to the Eagle Vision of later Assassins. He is also regarded as the founder of the organized Assassin Order.

=== Aya ===
Aya of Alexandria, later known as Amunet, is a co-founder of the Hidden Ones – the precursors to the Assassin Brotherhood – and Bayek's wife during the Hellenistic period of the Ptolemaic dynasty. On 12 August 30 BCE, Amunet infiltrates Cleopatra VII's palace, where she kills the last pharaoh of Ancient Egypt with an asp. By the Renaissance, Amunet is respected as a great Assassin by the Assassin Brotherhood, and a statue of her is placed in the Assassin Sanctuary of Monteriggioni. Around this time, a shrine in her honor is created at the Basilica di San Marco in Venice, Italy. Amunet's actual mummified remains instead rest alongside her husband's, in Egypt. Amunet is also the direct descendant of Kassandra, the canonical protagonist of Assassin's Creed Odyssey and her son Elpidios.

=== Cleopatra ===
Cleopatra VII Thea Philopator (69 BCE – 12 August 30 BCE), commonly known as Cleopatra, is the last Egyptian pharaoh and a member of the Ptolemaic dynasty. She initially shares power with her father, and later, her brothers, whom she marries. With the help of the Templars, she becomes the sole ruler of Egypt, and an ally of Julius Caesar. After Caesar's death, she allies herself with Mark Antony, with whom she has a relationship. In 30 BCE, Antony commits suicide at the Battle of Actium, and Cleopatra is assassinated by Amunet with an asp.

=== Julius Caesar ===
Gaius Julius Caesar (13 July 100 BCE – 15 March 44 BCE), commonly known as Julius Caesar was a prominent general in the Roman army and notable politician. He is killed for his Templar affiliations.

=== Ptolemy XIII ===
Ptolemy XIII Theos Philopator (62 BCE – 47 BCE) was a pharaoh of Egypt and a member of the Ptolemaic dynasty, ruling alongside his older sister and wife Cleopatra VII from 51 BCE until his death.

=== Marcus Junius Brutus ===
Marcus Junius Brutus (early June 85 BCE – late October 42 BCE), more commonly known simply as Brutus, is a politician of the late Roman Republic, and a member of the Roman Republic and Order of Assassins. Brutus is one of the masterminds behind the assassination conspiracy against Julius Caesar in 44 BCE. He is also the first known human to discover the Colosseum Vault.

=== Cassius ===
Gaius Cassius Longinus (c. 85 BCE – 3 October 42 BCE), commonly known as Cassius, is an Assassin, a Roman senator, and Brutus's brother-in-law. On 15 March 44 BCE, Cassius was part of the group Senators who stabbed Julius Caesar.

== Characters of Assassin's Creed Odyssey ==
=== Alexios and Kassandra ===
Alexios and Kassandra are half-siblings, one of whom is chosen by the player to be the protagonist (referred to as the Eagle Bearer) of Assassin's Creed Odyssey. They are Spartan Greek mercenaries who are descended from King Leonidas of Sparta, and fight for both the Delian and Peloponnesian Leagues during the Peloponnesian War. The sibling not chosen appears as a secondary character in the game known as Deimos. The Eagle Bearer eventually inherits the Staff of Hermes Trismegistus from Pythagoras, a powerful Isu artifact sought by Layla Hassan.

=== Barnabas ===
Barnabas is a Greek naval captain active during the Peloponnesian War. After he is rescued from the thug leader known as the Cyclops in Kephallonia by the Eagle Bearer, he offers the command of his ship, The Adrestia, and his crew. In his youth, Barnabas was a soldier before turning to commercial shipping for a livelihood. In this capacity, he developed a network of contacts throughout Greece, including local leaders and mercenaries, who becomes a primary source of information for the Eagle Bearer.

=== Herodotos ===
Herodotos (c. 484 BCE – c. 425 BCE), also spelled Herodotus, was one of the earliest Greek historians who hails from the island of Samos, off the coast of Anatolia. In Odyssey, Herodotos becomes a companion of the Eagle Bearer, and documents their ordeals during the Peloponnesian War. The record is lost to humanity until it is rediscovered by Layla Hassan.

=== King Leonidas of Sparta ===
Leonidas I (c. 540 BCE – 480 BCE) was a warrior king of the Greek city-state of Sparta, best known for his involvement in the Battle of Thermopylae against the Persian Empire in 480 BCE. In Odyssey, Leonidas is a direct descendant of the Isu, and wielded an Isu spear, which was later passed down to his daughter and eventually the grandchild known as the Eagle Bearer.

=== Myrrine ===
Myrrine, also known as the Phoenix while in exile, is the wife of Nikolaos, the mother of Alexios and Kassandra, and the daughter of King Leonidas of Sparta. She gives her eldest child the broken Spear of Leonidas, an Isu artifact and the family heirloom which she had inherited after Leonidas' death.

=== Nikolaos ===
Nikolaos of Sparta, also known as the Wolf of Sparta, is a Spartan general and Myrrine's husband. Because of Myrinne's heritage, Nikolaos has high hopes for her children due to their grandfather's fame and valor. However, an Oracle prophesies the potential destruction of Sparta at the hands of Myrrine's youngest, infant child. After the apparent death of an Elder as a result of the elder child's actions, Nikolaos reluctantly stood by a death sentence ordered by the other Spartan leaders and personally attempts to carry it out, only for the child to survive the fall from Mount Taygetos, and, in exile, grow up to become a legendary mercenary.

=== Cult of Kosmos ===
The Cult of Kosmos, a secretive cabal operating throughout Ancient Greece and the surrounding regions, are the overarching antagonists of Odyssey. The Cult operates in branches comprising several Adepts, with each brand led by an individual dubbed as a Sage, who are often prominent members within various levels of society in the Classical Greek world. Like their Egyptian counterparts, the Order of the Ancients, and the modern-day Templar Order, the Cult of Kosmos are not polytheistic, and have a deistic belief system. They manipulate the Greek world to maintain their power and wealth. Some members of the Cult idolize and worship the people within the Bloodline and truly believe that they are actual demigods, such as Deimos. The members of the Cult grow chaotic and greedy, and use the Chaos to earn massive amounts of profit and political power.

=== Darius ===
Artabanus, better known by his alias Darius, is a member of the Persian elite within the Achaemenid Empire, whose philosophy and combat tactics eventually form the basis of the Hidden Ones and its successor, the Brotherhood of Assassins. He is based on the historical figure Artabanus of Persia. In the 5th century BCE, the Order of the Ancients, an antecedent organization to the Templars, supports the reigns and regional conquests of the Achaemenid kings Darius I and his son Xerxes I. Using a newly created weapon known as the Hidden Blade, which becomes the Assassins' iconic signature weapon, Darius personally assassinates King Xerxes I and flees Persia with his surviving child afterwards. While the character is originally referenced and mentioned in Assassin's Creed II, Darius makes his first series appearance in the Assassin's Creed Odyssey's DLC pack, Legacy of the First Blade, where he encounters the Eagle Bearer. They work together to thwart the Order of the Ancients' activities in the Greek world, and Darius later becomes the father-in-law of the Eagle Bearer. By the ending of Legacy of the First Blade, Darius relocates to Egypt with his grandson Elpidios and raises him alone as the boy's guardian and mentor.

== Characters of Assassin's Creed Valhalla ==
=== Eivor Varinsdottir ===
Eivor Varinsdottir is the protagonist of Assassin's Creed Valhalla (2020). Although canonically female, the player may select Eivor's gender in the game; the female and male Eivor are portrayed by Cecilie Stenspil and Magnus Bruun, respectively. Eivor is a Viking raider and shieldmaiden who lived during the Viking Age in the late 9th century. Born to a minor noble family in Norway, Eivor is adopted by King Styrbjorn of the Raven Clan after her biological parents are killed in a raid by a rival Viking clan, during which Eivor is attacked and scarred by a wolf, leading to her nickname of "Wolf-Kissed". The friendship between Eivor and her adoptive brother Sigurd is central to Valhalla's story, the events of which are set in motion when the siblings, dissatisfied with the Unification of Norway in 872, decide to leave their homeland and sail to England. There, they establish their own settlement called Ravensthorpe together with other loyalists in the Raven Clan, which Eivor subsequently attempts to expand by forming alliances with neighboring Saxon kingdoms and Viking clans. While doing so, she becomes acquainted with the Hidden Ones, a precursor organization to the Assassin Brotherhood, and agrees to help them fight the growing influence of their sworn enemies, the Order of the Ancients (precursors to the Templar Order, the series' perennial antagonists).

Eivor is also the protagonist of two of Valhalla's story-driven expansions: Wrath of the Druids, where she travels to Ireland to help her cousin Bárid mac Ímair earn the favor of the High King of Ireland, Flann Sinna, and dismantles a druid cult called the Children of Danu; and The Siege of Paris, where she heads to Francia to partake in the titular siege and neutralize the threat posed by Emperor Charles the Fat. Additionally, several free story updates released for Valhalla continue Eivor's story, including A Fated Encounter, which sees her encountering Assassin's Creed Odyssey's protagonist Kassandra while they both search for an Isu artifact causing nightmares amongst the locals on the Isle of Skye; and The Last Chapter, set several years after the conclusion of the base game. Feeling she has done everything she could for Ravensthorpe, Eivor decides to better understand the nature of her connection with Odin, and leaves for Vinland after bidding farewell to her friends and allies. There, Eivor spends her final years in peace, conversing with Odin, who tells her about the Great Catastrophe that wiped out most of the Isu, and how he and his kind came to reincarnate themselves throughout the ages.

=== Sigurd Styrbjornsson ===
Sigurd Styrbjornsson (voiced by Gudmundur Thorvaldsson) is a Scandinavian Viking raider, the adoptive brother of Eivor.

=== Randvi ===
Randvi (voiced by Kajsa Mohammar) is a Norse woman who serves as chief advisor to the Raven Clan's settlement of Ravensthorpe. She is Sigurd's wife.

=== Ælfred the Great ===
Ælfred the Great (voiced by Tom Lewis) is the King of Wessex in Assassin's Creed Valhalla. A devout Christian ruler famous for defending England against Viking invasions, Ælfred is secretly the Grand Maegester of the Order of the Ancients. He inherited the position but despises the Order's pagan beliefs. Working from within under the alias "A Poor Fellow-Soldier of Christ," he helps Eivor dismantle it. After its fall, he plans to replace it with a new Christian order, laying the groundwork for the future Templar Order.

== Characters of Assassin's Creed Mirage ==
=== Basim Ibn Ishaq ===
Basim Ibn Ishaq (born c. 844) (voiced by Carlo Rota in Assassin's Creed Valhalla and by Lee Majdoub in Assassin's Creed Mirage) is the protagonist of Assassin's Creed Mirage, first introduced as a supporting character and hidden antagonist in Assassin's Creed Valhalla, before becoming the protagonist of its modern-day section. Born in Samarra during the 9th century, Basim is the son of the architect responsible for the creation of the Great Mosque of Samarra, though his father was exiled and died in poverty after someone else took credit for his work. Orphaned and alone, Basim becomes a small-time thief to survive on the streets of Baghdad until meeting the Hidden One Roshan, who inducts him into the Brotherhood and becomes his mentor, though the two would eventually have a falling out, resulting in Roshan leaving the Hidden Ones. Later in life, Basim becomes a mentor himself, taking Hytham as his first apprentice, and discovers he is the reincarnation of the Isu Loki, who betrayed his fellow Isu after Odin imprisoned his and Aletheia's son, Fenrir. Seeking revenge against the reincarnation of Odin on Loki's behalf, Basim meets Sigurd Styrbjornsson in Constantinople and, believing him to be Odin's reincarnation, accompanies him back to Norway, where he meets Sigurd's adoptive sister, Eivor Varinsdottir. Realizing Sigurd is actually the reincarnation of Tyr and Eivor is Odin's reincarnation, Basim formulates a plan to win their trust and accompanies them to England, where he and Hytham train Eivor in the Hidden Ones' ways and enlist her help in eliminating the local branch of the Order of the Ancients. After finding a Piece of Eden, the Saga Stone, Basim uses it to awaken Tyr's dormant memories in Sigurd, causing a rift in his and Eivor's friendship, and eventually follows the pair to an Isu temple in Norway, where he reveals his true intentions to kill Eivor. However, Basim is defeated by Eivor and Sigurd and trapped in the Grey, the Isu's simulated afterlife, where he remains until 2020, when Loki and Aletheia's plan finally comes to fruition and Basim is freed by Layla Hassan in exchange for helping her save the planet from certain doom. Basim subsequently abandons Layla in the Grey and rejuvenates his physical body using the Staff of Hermes Trismegistus, which was brought by Layla and contains Aletheia's consciousness. He then meets the modern-day Assassins and agrees to help them in their continued fight against the Templar Order, while secretly planning to find Loki's missing children.

=== Roshan ===
Roshan (c. 800 – unknown) (voiced by Shohreh Aghdashloo) is a former slave-turned-Master Assassin and Basim Ibn Ishaq's mentor, who inducted him into the Hidden Ones after saving him from several city guards in Baghdad. However, the two would eventually have a falling out, resulting in Roshan leaving the Hidden Ones and their fortress headquarters at Alamut, though she remains loyal to the Creed and continues to fight the Order of the Ancients' influence across the globe. In the late 9th century, while tracking an Order member named Al-Si'la to England, Roshan encounters Eivor Varinsdottir, who helps her kill Al-Si'la and her puppet, the so-called "Earl of Westerna", Edward, who had threatened Eivor's clan. Roshan then retrieves a scroll from Al-Si'la's body, which she claims to be a "seed" to be planted in Jerusalem, and parts ways with Eivor, leaving England to continue her mission.

== Characters of Assassin's Creed Shadows ==
=== Fujibayashi Naoe ===
Fujibayashi Naoe (born c. 1564) (voiced by Masumi Tsunoda) is one of the two protagonists of Assassin's Creed Shadows. She is a shinobi Assassin from Iga Province and the daughter of the legendary shinobi master Fujibayashi Nagato. Living during the final decades of the Sengoku period, Naoe becomes involved in Japan's wars of unification following the destruction of her homeland by the forces of Oda Nobunaga. Trained in stealth, infiltration, and assassination techniques, she represents the traditional Assassin playstyle, using tools such as the hidden blade, kunai, and kusarigama. Alongside Yasuke, she becomes part of a new Japanese Assassin Brotherhood and fights against forces seeking control over Japan.

=== Yasuke ===
Yasuke (voiced by Tongayi Chirisa) is one of the two protagonists of Assassin's Creed Shadows. Based on the historical African samurai, Yasuke, who served under Oda Nobunaga during the Azuchi–Momoyama period, Yasuke arrives in Japan in 1579 with Jesuit missionaries before entering Nobunaga's service. Unlike Naoe's stealth-based approach, Yasuke represents the warrior path, fighting as a heavily armored samurai using weapons such as the katana, kanabō, and bow. Initially connected to Nobunaga's campaigns against the Iga shinobi, Yasuke eventually joins forces with Naoe as they pursue a shared goal.

=== Fujibayashi Nagato ===
Fujibayashi Nagato (voiced by Peter Shinkoda) is Naoe's father and a master shinobi of Iga Province. A respected leader among the Iga shinobi, he trains Naoe in the arts of stealth and combat. His actions and legacy serve as a major influence on Naoe's journey and her connection to the Assassin Brotherhood.

=== Oda Nobunaga ===
Oda Nobunaga (voiced by Hiro Kanagawa) is a historical daimyo and one of the central figures of Assassin's Creed Shadows. As one of Japan's great unifiers during the Sengoku period, Nobunaga seeks to bring an end to the country's civil wars through military conquest. His campaigns include the assault on Iga Province, placing him in direct conflict with the shinobi of Naoe's homeland. Yasuke becomes one of his retainers and serves within his forces.

=== Luís Fróis ===
Luís Fróis is a Portuguese Jesuit missionary who traveled to Japan during the late 16th century. He serves as a link between Yasuke's arrival in Japan and the wider influence of European powers during the Sengoku period.

== Sources ==
- Bowden, Oliver (23 June 2011). Assassin's Creed: The Secret Crusade. Penguin UK. p. 464. ISBN 9780141966717. Archived from the original on 7 November 2023.
- Bowden, Oliver (26 November 2009). Assassin's Creed: Renaissance. Penguin UK. p. 528. ISBN 9780141046303. Archived from the original on 7 November 2023.
- Bowden, Oliver (25 November 2010). Assassin's Creed: Brotherhood. Penguin Books Limited. p. 544. ISBN 9780241951712. Archived from the original on 7 November 2023.
