= Caterina de' Pazzi =

Italian blessed

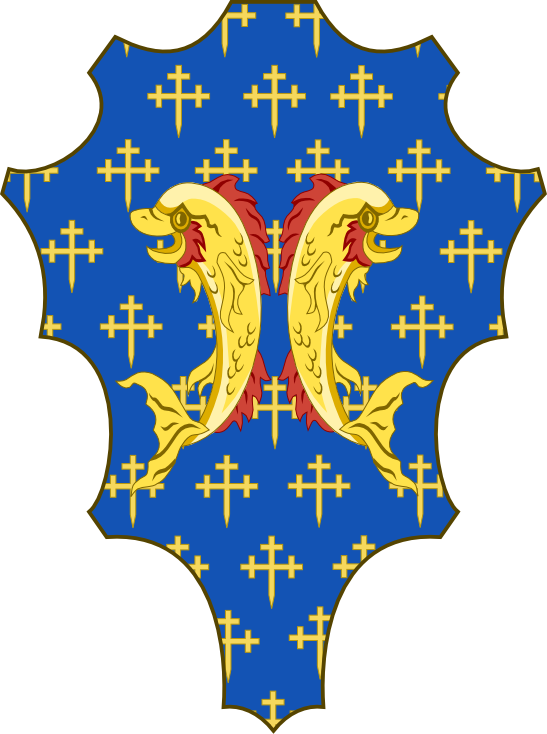
- Arms of Pazzi family
- Born: 1463; Republic of Florence
- Died: 23 August 1490 (aged 26–27); Convent of Monticelli, Republic of Florence
- Cause of death: Deprivations for spiritual purpose
- Venerated in: All Churches that admit the cult of saints
- Beatified: XVIII century, Rome by Pope Benedict XIV

Caterina di Jacopo de' Pazzi (1463 – 23 August 1490) was an Italian blessed, and daughter of Jacopo de' Pazzi, creator of the Pazzi Conspiracy.

== Early life ==
Caterina de' Pazzi was born in 1463 in the Republic of Florence. She was the natural daughter, later legitimized, and the only child of the Florentine nobleman, politician and banker Jacopo de' Pazzi. Her mother's name is unknown and Caterina was raised by her father's legitimate wife, Maddalena Serristori, who failed to have any own children. She was istruited by Stefano da Bagnone.

== Life in exile ==
In April 1478 her father, her tutor, and two of her cousins, Francesco and Renato, were executed, among others, following the failure of their conspiracy against the Medici brothers, Lorenzo and Giuliano, governors de facto of the city of Florence. The rest of the men of Pazzi family was exiled, their family name condemned to damnatio memoriae and the women condemned to choose whether to enter a convent or continue to live in Florence but renounce the right to marry. Caterina, together with her stepmother, chose the convent, taking her vows in the Franciscan convent of Monticelli, directed by Filippa de' Medici, who became her spiritual guide and her close friend.

Caterina lived a life of repentances and deprivations, dying on 23 August 1490 at age twenty-seven. On her deathbed, she asked Filippa for the grace to pray for her family.

== Beatification ==
For her life and death, she was beatified by Pope Benedict XIV.
