= Francesco Nori (1430–1478) =

Italian banker

Francesco Nori (1430 – 26 April 1478) was a Florentine banker. During the Pazzi assassination attempt of 1478 he protected Lorenzo de' Medici, saving his life at the cost of his own.

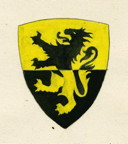
Arms of Nori family

== Biography ==
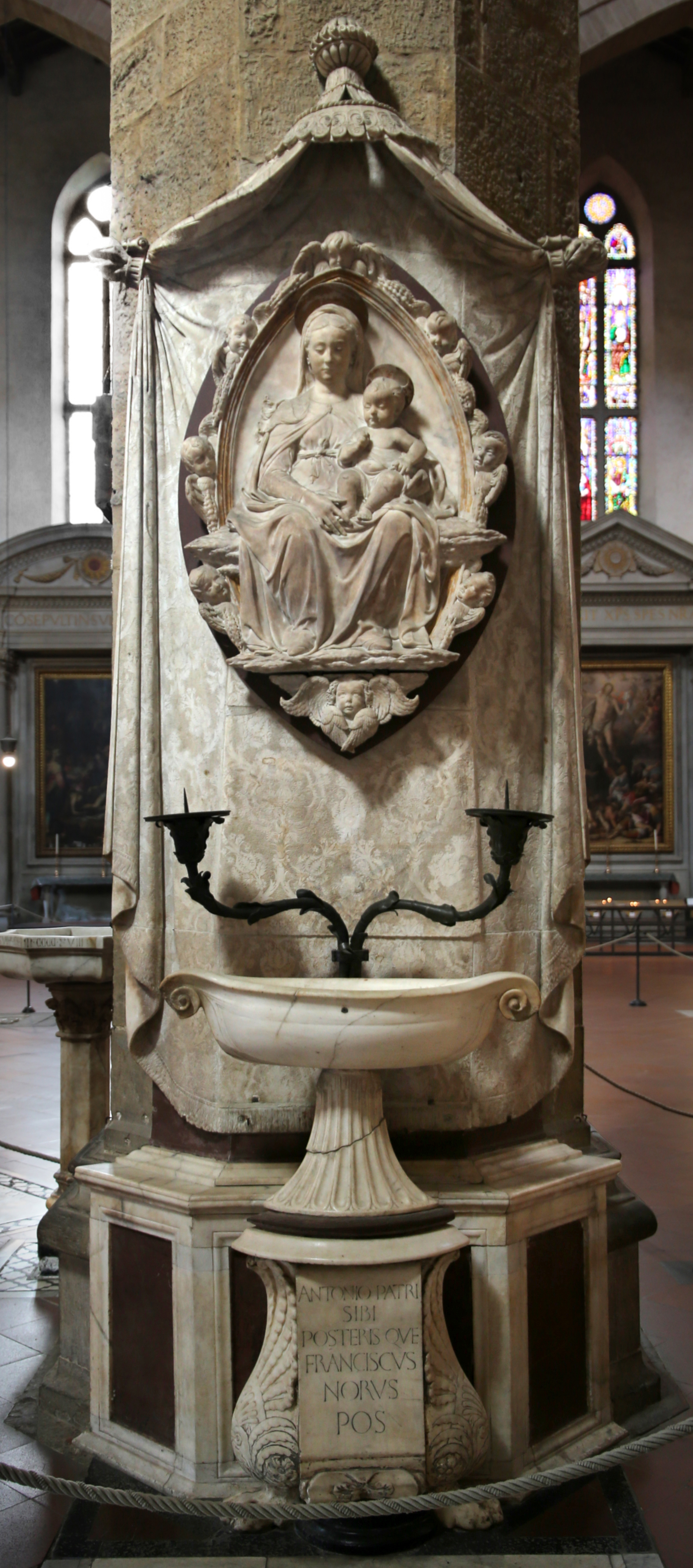
Tomb of Francesco Nori

Francesco Nori was born in 1430 in the Republic of Florence. A member of the noble Nori family and belonging to the Medici party, he became part of the intimate circle of Lorenzo de' Medici, eventually managing the central Florentine branch of the Medici Bank.

On 26 April 1478, during Easter Mass in the Florentine Cathedral of Saint Mary of the Flower, a group of conspirators, led by Jacopo and Francesco de' Pazzi, attacked Lorenzo and his brother Giuliano in what would become known as the Pazzi conspiracy. Francesco Nori shielded Lorenzo during the first assault, dying stabbed in his place by the hand of Bernardo Bandini. His gesture allowed Lorenzo to realize the danger and to escape his other aggressors, Stefano da Bagnone and Antonio Maffei, determining the failure of the conspiracy and the definitive rise of Lorenzo to Lord of Florence.

Before the conspiracy, Francesco had commissioned the sculptor Antonio Rossellino to create a marble sculpture of the Nursing Madonna. This was used by the Nori family to create a mausoleum for Francesco in the Santa Croce Church, facing Michelangelo’s tomb. Lorenzo never honored Nori’s death.
