= I Medici =

Opera by Ruggero Leoncavallo

- Opera by Ruggero Leoncavallo
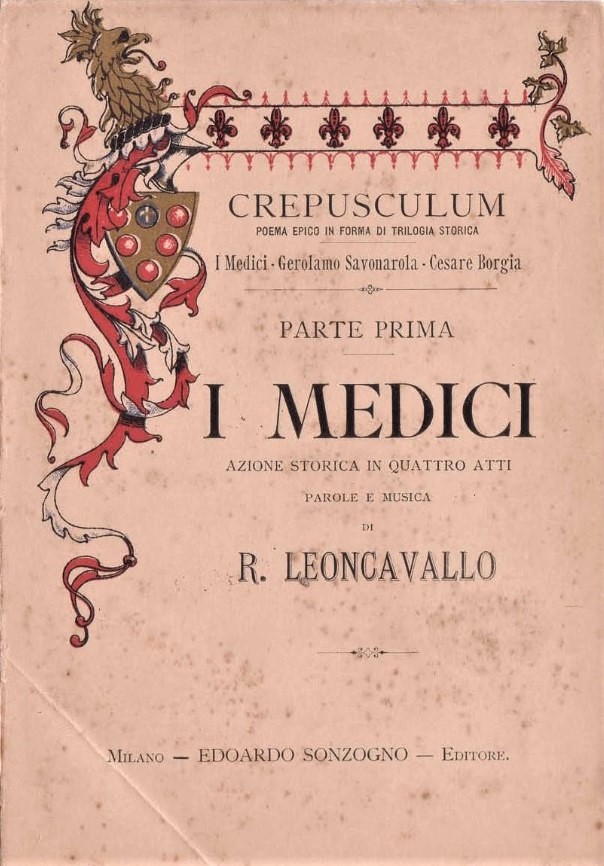
- Librettto cover published in 1894
- Librettist: Ruggero Leoncavallo
- Premiere: 6 November 1893; Teatro Dal Verme, Milan

I Medici is an opera in four acts composed by Ruggero Leoncavallo, with a libretto by the composer. Set in Renaissance Florence at the court of Lorenzo de' Medici, it was intended as the first part of a planned but unfinished trilogy called Crepusculum. The opera premiered on 6 November 1893 at the Teatro Dal Verme in Milan.

== Background and performance history ==
I Medici was intended as the first part of a planned but unfinished trilogy called Crepusculum, with the second and third operas to be called Savonarola and I Borgia. The word "crepusculum" is Latin for "twilight", signaling the influence of Richard Wagner's tetralogy Der Ring des Nibelungen (whose fourth installment is called "Twilight of the Gods" (Götterdämmerung)). The remaining two operas were never completed. Leoncavallo sought to create an "epic poem" for the stage. However, one contemporary review of the premiere stated:

In I Medici we have a historical opera like those that have been made many times before and will be hence ... [but] we do not have either an epoch or a set of characters brought truthfully to life; we do not have, in a word, that human counterpart of Wagner's mythological trilogy at which Leoncavallo gazed. (Note: Original Italian: "In I Medici abbiamo un'opera su sfondo storico come ce ne furono tante prima e come ce ne saranno dopo ... non-abbiamo né un'epoca né un complesso di figure vive e vere; non-abbiamo, in una parola, quel contrapposto umano alla trilogia mitica del Wagner a cui il Leoncavallo ha mirato.")

It premièred at the Teatro Dal Verme in Milan on 9 November 1893. It was not successful in its day and has never become part of the standard repertoire. However, it was revived at the Frankfurt Alte Oper in 1993 in a concert version conducted by Marcello Viotti (the opera's first performance in Germany) and was given a fully staged performance in March 2013 at the Theater Erfurt in Erfurt, Germany, conducted by Emmanuel Joel-Hornak.

== Roles ==
Roles, voice types, premier cast
Role	Voice type	Premiere cast, 9 November 1893 Conductor: Rodolfo Ferrari
Giuliano de' Medici	tenor	Francesco Tamagno
Lorenzo de' Medici	baritone	Ottorino Beltrami
Simonetta Cattanei	soprano lirico	Adelina Stehle
Fioretta de' Gori	dramatic soprano	Adele Gini Pizzorni
Giambattista da Montesecco	bass	Giovanni Scarneo
Francesco de' Pazzi	bass	Ludovico Contini
Bernardo Bandini Baroncelli	tenor	Giovanni Pagliano
Il Poliziano	baritone	Vittorio Bellati
Archbishop Salviati	bass	Gaetano Biancardi
Simonetta's mother	mezzo-soprano	Federica Casali

== Synopsis ==
The opera is set in Renaissance Italy and concerns intrigues centering on the Medici family, and the Pazzi conspiracy. Giuliano de' Medici loves Simonetta Cattanei, who tries to warn him of the conspiracy against his family. But she is killed by Montesecco, a murderer hired by Pope Sixtus V. Giuliano is killed by the conspirators, but Lorenzo de' Medici escapes with the help of the poet Poliziano. He then wins the support of the people, who lynch the conspirators.

== Recordings ==
A recording of the opera was released in 2010 on Deutsche Grammophon featuring Plácido Domingo as Giuliano de' Medici, Carlos Álvarez as Lorenzo de' Medici, Vitalij Kowaljow as Francesco de' Pazzi, Daniela Dessì as Simonetta Cattanei (Simonetta Vespucci née Cattaneo) and Renata Lamanda as Fioretta de' Gori. It was recorded in July 2007 at the Teatro Comunale Florence, with Alberto Veronesi conducting the Orchestra and Chorus of the Maggio Musicale Fiorentino .

== See also ==
- Medici (TV series)
