= Guglielmo de' Pazzi =

Italian nobleman, banker and politician

- Lord of Civitella
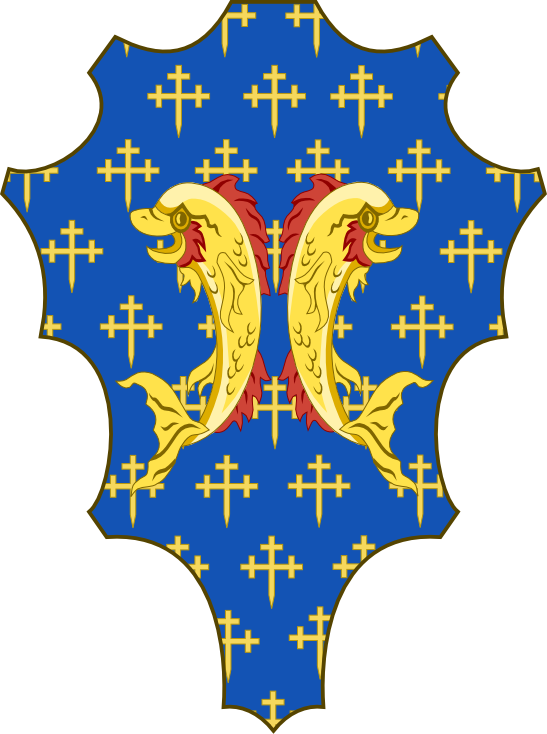
- Arms of Pazzi family
- Reign: c. 1514 - 6 July 1516
- Successor: Antonio di Guglielmo de' Pazzi, II Lord of Civitella
- Born: Guglielmo di Antonio de' Pazzi; 6 August 1437; Republic of Florence
- Died: 6 July 1516 (aged 78)
- Noble family: Pazzi
- Spouse: Bianca de' Medici (m. 1459; dead 1505)
- Issue: 16 children
- Father: Antonio di Andrea de' Pazzi
- Mother: Nicolosa degli Alessandri

Guglielmo di Antonio de' Pazzi, Lord of Civitella (Republic of Florence, 6 August 1437 - 6 July 1516) was an Italian nobleman, banker and politician from the Republic of Florence. He was also husband of Bianca de' Medici, sister of the Lord of Florence Lorenzo the Magnificent.

== Biography ==
Guglielmo was born in Florence on 6 August 1437. He was one of nine children (three sons and six daughters) of Antonio di Andrea de' Pazzi and his wife Nicolosa degli Alessandri.

In August 1459 he married Bianca de' Medici (1445 - 1505), a member of the most powerful and wealthy family in the city and daughter of the Lord of Florence Piero de' Medici and sister of Lorenzo the Magnificent. Thanks to the marriage, Guglielmo obtained many important offices. He was Priore of Liberty (1467), VIII of Balia and Guardia (1469), Officer of Monte (1471) and Mint Consul (1475).

In 1478 relations between the Medici and Pazzi had deteriorated for political, economic and personal reasons. Jacopo and Francesco de' Pazzi (Guglielmo's uncle and brother) organized the Pazzi Conspiracy to kill Lorenzo and his brother Giuliano de' Medici. Giuliano died but Lorenzo survived. With the support of the city, Lorenzo retaliated by killing or exiling all male members of the Pazzi family, and forbidding any Pazzi women who chose to stay in Florence from marrying. Finally he condemned the Pazzi to damnatio memoriae. Guglielmo did not take part in the conspiracy, but was himself exiled and banned from politics for 15 years. His wife and children went with him. However, his daughters were exempt from the ban on marrying. His wife Bianca died in 1505.

In 1495 he held political offices in Tortona and was ambassador to Charles VIII of France. In 1497 and 1498 he held offices in Mugello and Scarperia. In 1501 he fought for Florence against Pisa and in 1502 he was Commissioner in Val di Chiana and Arezzo. In 1513 he became Gonfaloniere, the highest Florentine office.

Later he bought the fiefdom of Civitella in Romagna and became Lord of Civitella.

He died on 6 July 1516.

== Family ==
Bianca and Guglielmo had sixteen children, nine sons and seven daughters:

- Antonio de' Pazzi (1460), died as an infant;
- Giovanna de' Pazzi, married Tommaso Monaldi in 1481;
- Antonio de' Pazzi (1462-1528), ambassador and politician, Gonfaloniere di Giustizia in 1521, second Lord of Civitella;
- Contessina de' Pazzi, married Giuliano Salviati in 1486;
- Alessandra de' Pazzi (1465), married Bartolomeo Buondelmonti in 1486;
- Cosimo de' Pazzi (1466-1513), archbishop of Florence from 1508 until his death;
- Piero de' Pazzi (1468), died as an infant;
- Lorenzo Alessandro de' Pazzi, (1470-1535) merchant, patron of the arts and latinist;
- Cosa de' Pazzi, married Francesco di Luca Capponi;
- Renato de' Pazzi, goldsmith merchant
- Lorenzo de' Pazzi, politician and ambassador;
- Luigia de' Pazzi, married Folco di Edoardo Portinari in 1494;
- Maddalena de' Pazzi, married Ormanozzo Deti in 1497;
- Alessandro de' Pazzi (1483-1530) ambassador, literate and greekist;
- Lucrezia de' Pazzi, married Cattani di Diacceto, and then a member of Martelli family in 1500;
- Giuliano de' Pazzi (1486-1517), doctor of law, abbot and canon of the Metropolitan of Florence.
