= Andrea de' Pazzi =

Italian politician

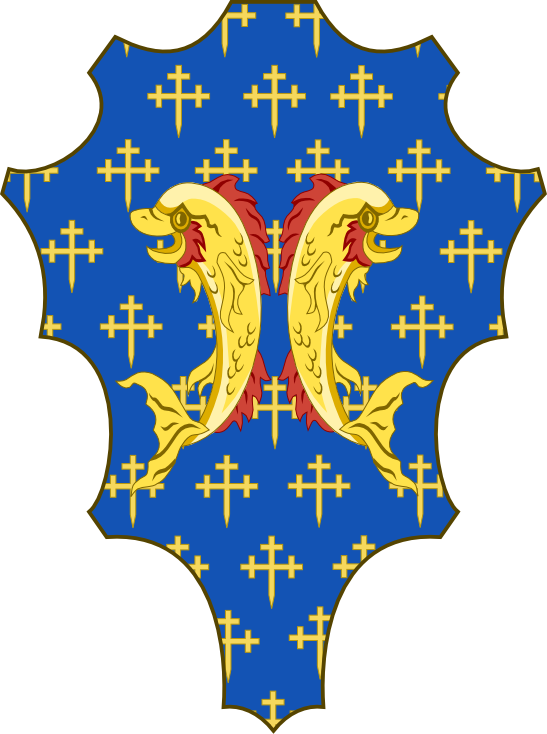
- Arms of Pazzi family
- Born: Andrea di Guglielmo de' Pazzi; 1372; Republic of Florence
- Died: 19 October 1445 (aged 72–73); Republic of Florence
- Noble family: Pazzi
- Spouse: Caterina Salviati
- Issue: Antonio de' Pazzi; Apollonia de' Pazzi; Guglielmo de' Pazzi; Piero de' Pazzi; Elena "Lena" de' Pazzi; Albiera de' Pazzi; Jacopo de' Pazzi
- Father: Guglielmo de' Pazzi
- Mother: Costanza de' Bardi

Andrea di Guglielmo de' Pazzi (1372, Florence - 19 October 1445) was an Italian politician of Republic of Florence, known for having commissioned the Pazzi Chapel from Filippo Brunelleschi and for being the father of Jacopo de' Pazzi and the grandfather of Francesco and Guglielmo de' Pazzi.

== Biography ==
Andrea de' Pazzi was born in Florence in 1372, son of Guglielmo de' Pazzi and Costanza de' Bardi, two prestigious dynasties of wealthy bankers, belonging to the Guelph political faction.

Andrea began his political career in 1411 as Councilor of the Republic. In 1413 he was Captain of the Guelphs. Esteemed by his fellow citizens, he directed numerous diplomatic missions, including the one to make agreements with the then pope John XXIII Cossa, while in 1420 he was ambassador in Genoa. In 1431 and 1438 he was Consul of the Mint and in 1432 Podestà of the municipalities of Segna and Campi. However, his career was hampered by the fact that the Pazzi family belonged to the list of Magnate, noble families that were barred from public political positions due to the Ordinances of Justice of Giano della Bella.

In 1434 he allied himself with Cosimo de' Medici, who was also married to a Bardi, Contessina, and ensured that the Pazzi family was registered among the Popolari ones, so as to allow them a political career. In the same year Andrea was knighted by René of Anjou. In 1437 he was Consul of the ''Arte della Lana'' and Prior of the Arts in 1439.

In 1429 he commissioned the Pazzi Chapel at Filippo Brunelleschi, but the chapel, a Renaissance masterpiece, remained unfinished when the Pazzi family was exiled from Florence after the Pazzi conspiracy in 1478.

== Issue ==
He married Caterina Salviati in 1409. By her he had seven children, four sons and three daughters:

- Antonio (1410-1458), married Nicolosa degli Alessandri. They had three sons, including Francesco, implicated in the Pazzi conspiracy, and Guglielmo, who married Bianca de' Medici, Cosimo's granddaughter, and six daughters.
- Apollonia
- Guglielmo (1415, perhaps died as a child).
- Piero (1416-1464). He had seven children, including Renato de' Pazzi, killed after the failed Pazzi conspiracy.
- Elena, also called Lena (b. 1418)
- Albiera (n. 1420)
- Jacopo (1423 - 1478), implicated in the Pazzi conspiracy.

== In medias ==
- In the first season of the TV series Medici, Andrea de' Pazzi is played by the Italian actor Daniel Caltagirone.

== Sources ==
- Francesca Gargani, The Pazzi Chapel in Santa Croce, in Chapels of the Renaissance in Florence, Giusti, Florence, 1998. ISBN 88-8200-017-6
- Pompeo Litta, Pazzi di Firenze, in Famiglie celebri d'Italia, Milan, 1835
- https://www.treccani.it/enciclopedia/andrea-di-guglielmo-de-pazzi_(Dictionary-Biographical)
