= Renato de' Pazzi =

Italian politician

Renato di Piero de' Pazzi (6 September 1442 - April 1478) was an Italian politician and banker by Republic of Florence, who died in the riots that followed the failure of the Pazzi conspiracy against the Medici family.

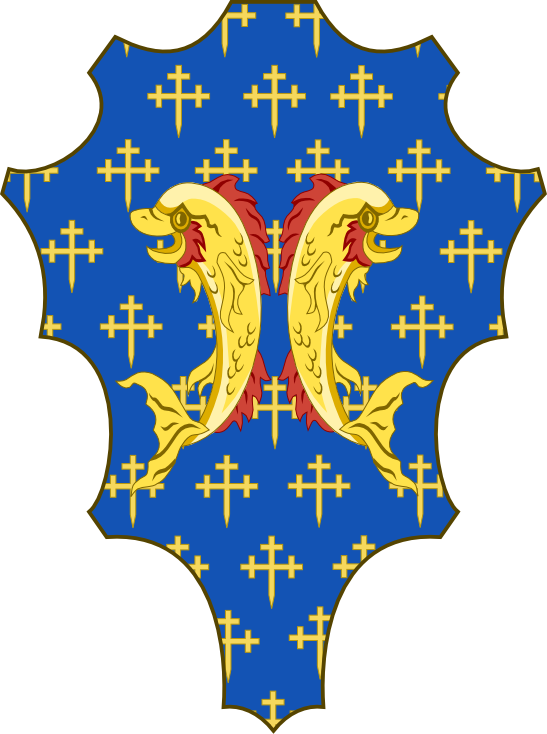
Arms of Pazzi family

== Biography ==
Renato de' Pazzi was born on 6 September 1442 in the Republic of Florence. He was a member of Pazzi family, one of seven children of Piero de' Pazzi and grandson of Andrea de' Pazzi. His uncles were Jacopo and Antonio de' Pazzi, and his cousins Guglielmo and Francesco de' Pazzi (sons of Antonio). He was baptized in the presence of René of Anjou, a close friend of his grandfather, and named in his honour.

In 1463 he married Francesca Martini, with whom he had eight children, and held some modest positions in the city government such as Member of the VIII di Balia e Guardia (1473) and mint officer (1476).

In 1478 he learned of plans by his uncle Jacopo and his cousin Francesco to eliminate the brothers Lorenzo and Giuliano de' Medici, governors de facto of the city of Florence. Renato was against and did not take part in the conspiracy and, when it failed on 26 April 1478, he tried to flee from Florence, but failed and few days after he was captured, lynched and finally hanged at windows of the Palazzo della Signoria from the crowd of Medici supporters.
