= Stefano da Bagnone =

Italian conspirator

- Born: 1418; Bagnone, Republic of Florence
- Died: 3 May 1478 (aged 59–60); Florence, Republic of Florence
- Cause of death: Hanging
- Occupation: Presbyter
- Employer: Jacopo de' Pazzi
- Known for: Taking parte to Pazzi conspiracy
- Motive: Political ostility for Lorenzo de' Medici's government on Florence
- Conviction: Death for hanging

Details
- Date: 26 April 1478
- Country: Italy
- Location: Duomo of Florence
- Targets: Lorenzo de' Medici; Giuliano de' Medici
- Killed: Giuliano de' Medici
- Injured: Lorenzo de' Medici
- Weapon: Knife
- Date apprehended: 26 April 1478
- Imprisoned at: 26 April 1478

Stefano da Bagnone (1418 – 3 May 1478) was an Italian presbyter, known for having taken part in the Pazzi conspiracy against Lorenzo de' Medici.

== Biography ==
Stefano was born in 1418 in Bagnone. Having taken his religious vows, he entered the service of Jacopo de' Pazzi, a Florentine banker, as chaplain and tutor to his daughter Caterina.

Of republican and liberal ideas, he was hostile to the government of Lorenzo de' Medici because he considered it tyrannical. For this reason, in April 1478, he agreed to take part in the conspiracy conceived by Jacopo to kill Lorenzo and his brother Giuliano. Initially, the two were to be eliminated during a dinner in their palace by the mercenary Giovanni Battista Montesecco, but Giuliano's absence prevented the project from being carried out.

The conspirators then decided to eliminate the Medici brothers during the Easter mass on 26 April 1478, in the Cathedral of Santa Maria del Fiore. However, Montesecco refused to kill on sacred ground, so the task of killing Lorenzo was entrusted to Stefano, Antonio Maffei and Bernardo Bandini. The three failed, both through inexperience and through the intervention of Francesco Nori, and Lorenzo survived with only a few minor injuries.

Later, Lorenzo turned the crowd against the conspirators, who in a few days were almost all captured and killed. Stefano and Antonio were captured, tried and tortured, having their ears and nose cut off.

On 3 May 1478, after making a complete confession, they were hanged from the windows of Palazzo della Signoria.

== Popular culture ==
- Stefano da Bagnone appears in the video game Assassin's Creed II, as one of the victims of the protagonist Ezio Auditore.
