= Pazzi =

Italian noble family in the Middle Ages

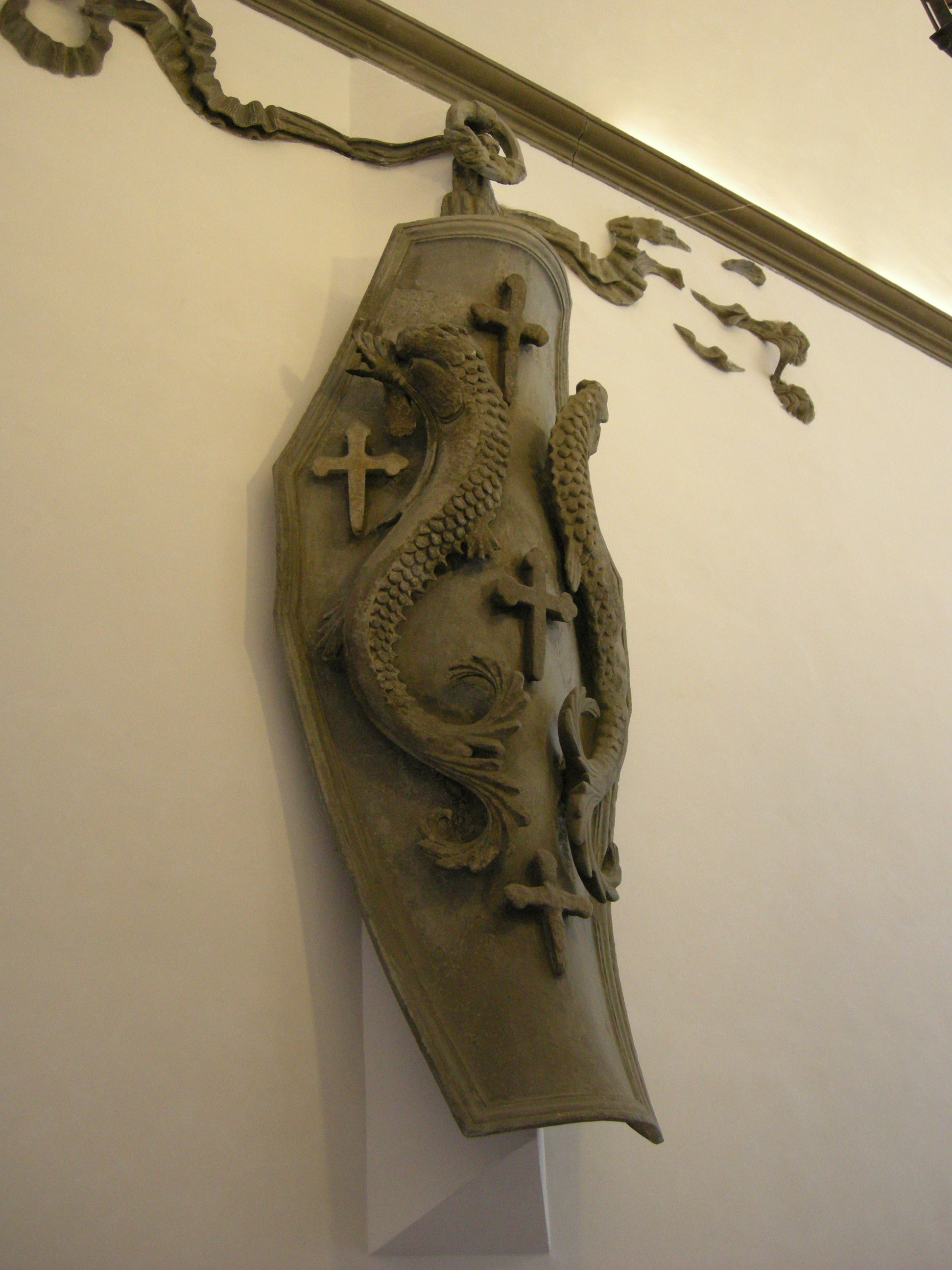
- Palazzo Pazzi, coat-of-arms of the family by Donatello
- Current region: Tuscany
- Origin: Republic of Florence
- Members: Jacopo de' Pazzi (d. 1260); Andrea de' Pazzi (d. 1445); Jacopo de' Pazzi (d. 1478); Caterina de' Pazzi (d. 1490); Renato de' Pazzi (d. 1478); Francesco de' Pazzi (d. 1478); Guglielmo de' Pazzi (d. 1516); Maria Maddalena de' Pazzi (d. 1607)

The Pazzi were a powerful family in the Republic of Florence. Their main trade during the fifteenth century was banking. In the aftermath of the Pazzi conspiracy in 1478, members of the family were banished from Florence and their property was confiscated; the family name and coat-of-arms were permanently suppressed by order of the Signoria.

== History ==
The traditional story is that the family was founded by Pazzo di Ranieri, first man over the walls during the Siege of Jerusalem of 1099, during the First Crusade, who returned to Florence with flints supposedly from the Holy Sepulchre, which were kept at Santi Apostoli and used on Holy Saturday to re-kindle fire in the city. The historical basis of this legend has been in question since the work of Luigi Passerini Orsini de' Rilli in the mid-nineteenth century.

The first apparently historical figure in the family is the Jacopo de' Pazzi il Vecchio who was a captain of the Florentine (Guelph) cavalry at the battle of Montaperti on 4 September 1260, and whose hand was treacherously severed by Bocca degli Abati, causing the standard to fall. His son Pazzino di Jacopo de' Pazzi was a Black Guelph and a follower of Charles de Valois.

Andrea di Guglielmo de' Pazzi (1372–1445) was a banker and merchant. In 1429 he commissioned construction of the Pazzi Chapel in the Franciscan church of Santa Croce in Florence. His son Jacopo de' Pazzi became head of the family in 1464.

Guglielmo di Antonio de' Pazzi married Bianca de' Medici, sister of Lorenzo de' Medici, in 1460; Cosimo de' Pazzi, the sixth of their sixteen children, became archbishop of Florence in 1508.

Francesco de' Pazzi was one of the instigators of the Pazzi conspiracy in 1477–78. He, Jacopo de' Pazzi and Jacopo's brother Renato de' Pazzi were executed after the plot failed.

Raffaele de' Pazzi was a condottiere; he died at the Battle of Ravenna in 1512.

Maria Maddalena de' Pazzi (1566–1607) was a Carmelite nun and mystic; she was canonised in 1669.

=== Pazzi conspiracy ===
Early in 1477, Francesco de' Pazzi, manager in Rome of the Pazzi bank, plotted with Girolamo Riario, nephew and protégé of the pope, Sixtus IV, and with Francesco Salviati, whom Sixtus had made archbishop of Pisa, to assassinate Lorenzo de' Medici and his brother Giuliano and oust the Medici family as rulers of Florence. Sixtus gave tacit support to the conspirators. The assassination attempt was made during mass in the Florence Cathedral on 26 April 1478. Giuliano was killed; Lorenzo was wounded, but escaped. Salviati, with mercenaries from Perugia, failed in his attempt to take over the Palazzo della Signoria. Most of the conspirators were soon caught and summarily executed; five, including Francesco de' Pazzi, were hanged from the windows of the Palazzo della Signoria. Jacopo de' Pazzi, head of the family, escaped from Florence, but was caught and brought back. He was tortured, then hanged from the Palazzo della Signoria next to the decomposing corpse of Salviati. He was buried at Santa Croce, but the body was dug up and thrown into a ditch. It was then dragged through the streets and propped up at the door of Palazzo Pazzi, where the rotting head was mockingly used as a door-knocker. From there it was thrown into the Arno; children fished it out and hung it from a willow tree, flogged it, and then threw it back into the river.

The Pazzi were banished from Florence, and their lands and property confiscated. Guglielmo de' Pazzi, husband of Lorenzo's sister Bianca, was placed under house arrest, and later forbidden to enter the city; he went to live at Torre a Decima, near Pontassieve. The family name and coat-of-arms were perpetually suppressed by decree of the Signoria. The name was erased from public registers, and all buildings and streets carrying it were renamed. Their shield with its dolphins was obliterated. Anyone named Pazzi had to take a new name; any man married to a Pazzi was barred from public office. Customs and traditions of the family were suppressed, among them the Easter Saturday ritual involving the flint from Jerusalem.

After the overthrow of Piero de' Medici in 1494, members of the Pazzi family were able to return to Florence.

== Buildings ==
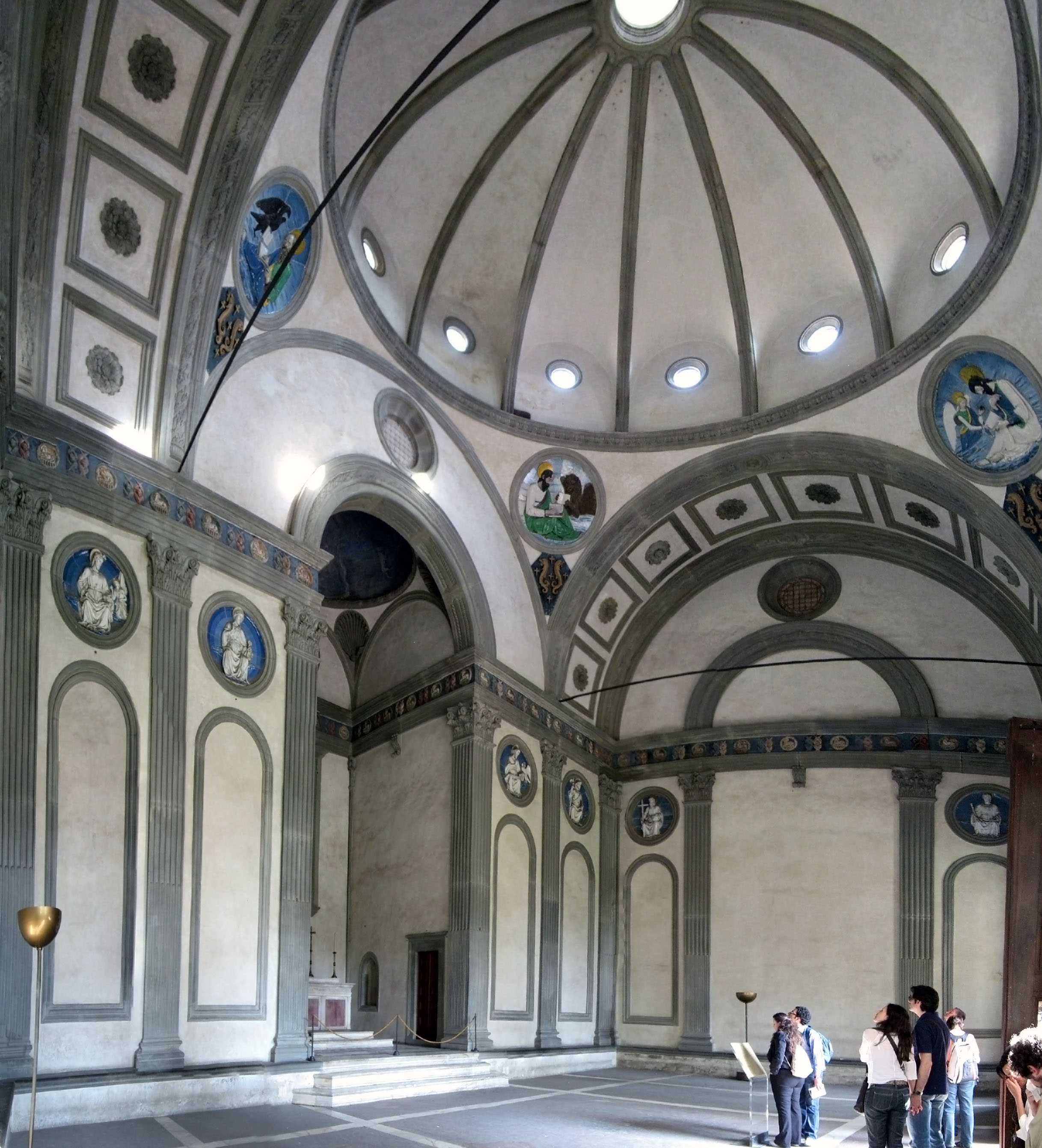
Interior of the Pazzi Chapel

The Pazzi Chapel in the Franciscan church of Santa Croce in Florence was commissioned by Andrea di Guglielmo de' Pazzi in 1429. It was designed by Filippo Brunelleschi. (Note: It has been suggested that it was designed not by Brunelleschi but by Michelozzo.) Construction began in 1442 in a cloister of the church, and continued after the death of the patron in 1445 and the architect in 1446; work was interrupted by the Pazzi plot and the chapel was never completed.

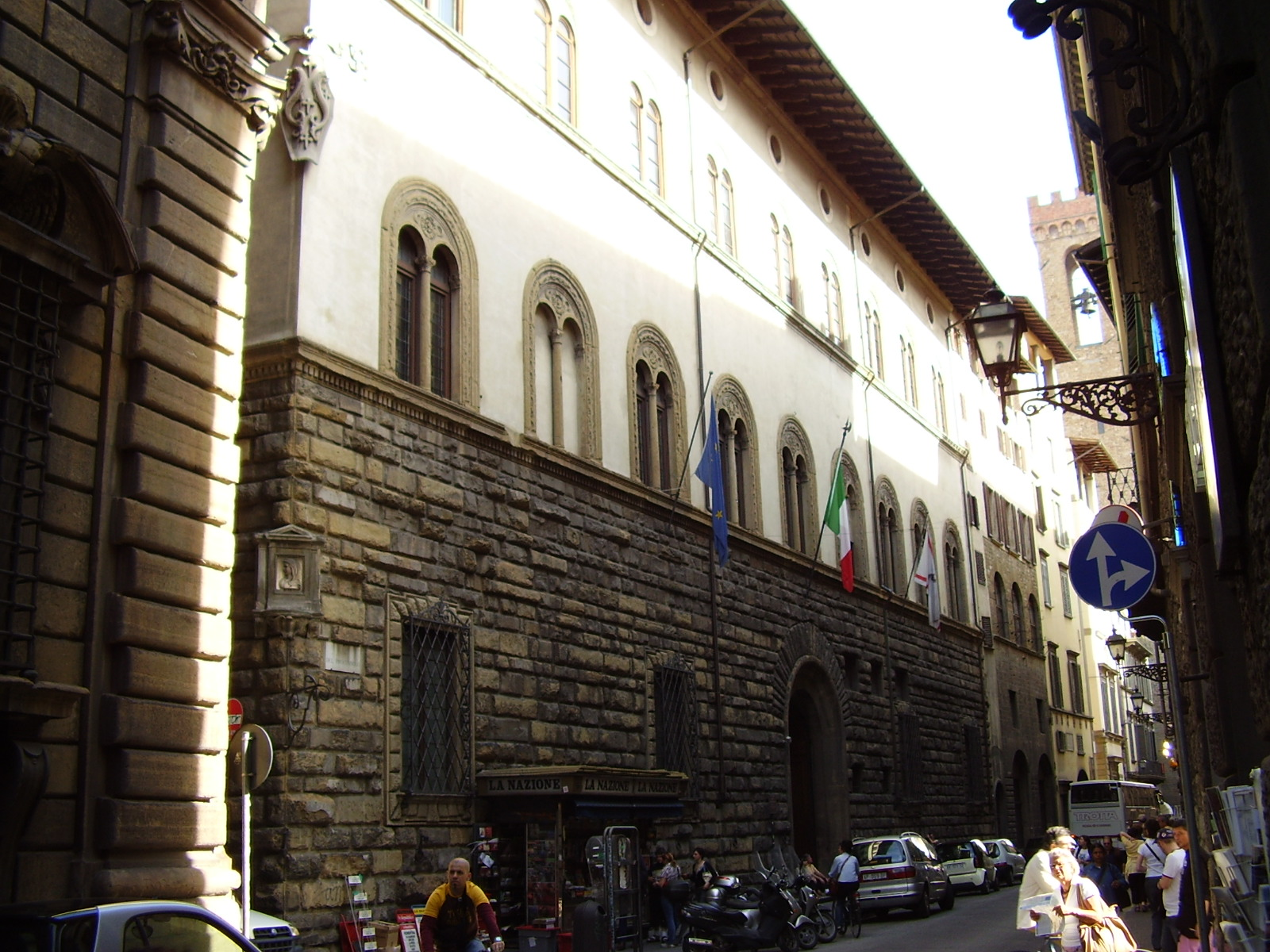
Palazzo Pazzi, showing the yellow-ochre pietra forte sandstone and stuccoed architecture.

Palazzo Pazzi or Palazzo Pazzi-Quaratesi was the main seat of the family in the "Canto dei Pazzi", at the intersection of Borgo degli Albizi and via del Proconsolo. It was commissioned by Jacopo de' Pazzi, and built circa 1462–1472 to designs by Giuliano da Maiano. Above its traditionally rusticated ground floor of yellow-ochre sandstone, it had a then-novel stuccoed first and second floor, with delicate designs in the windows influenced by Brunelleschi. The central court is surrounded on three sides by round-headed arcading, with circular bosses in the spandrels.

Palazzo Pazzi Ammannati (or Palazzo Pazzi dell'Accademia Colombaria) is a smaller palace in the Borgo degli Albizi, between Palazzo Ramirez de Montalvo and the Palazzo Nonfinito. It houses a section of the Museum of Natural History of Florence, and hosts temporary exhibitions. The façade is attributed to Bartolomeo Ammannati.
