= Jacopo de' Pazzi =

Florentine banker and head of Pazzi family (1423–1478)

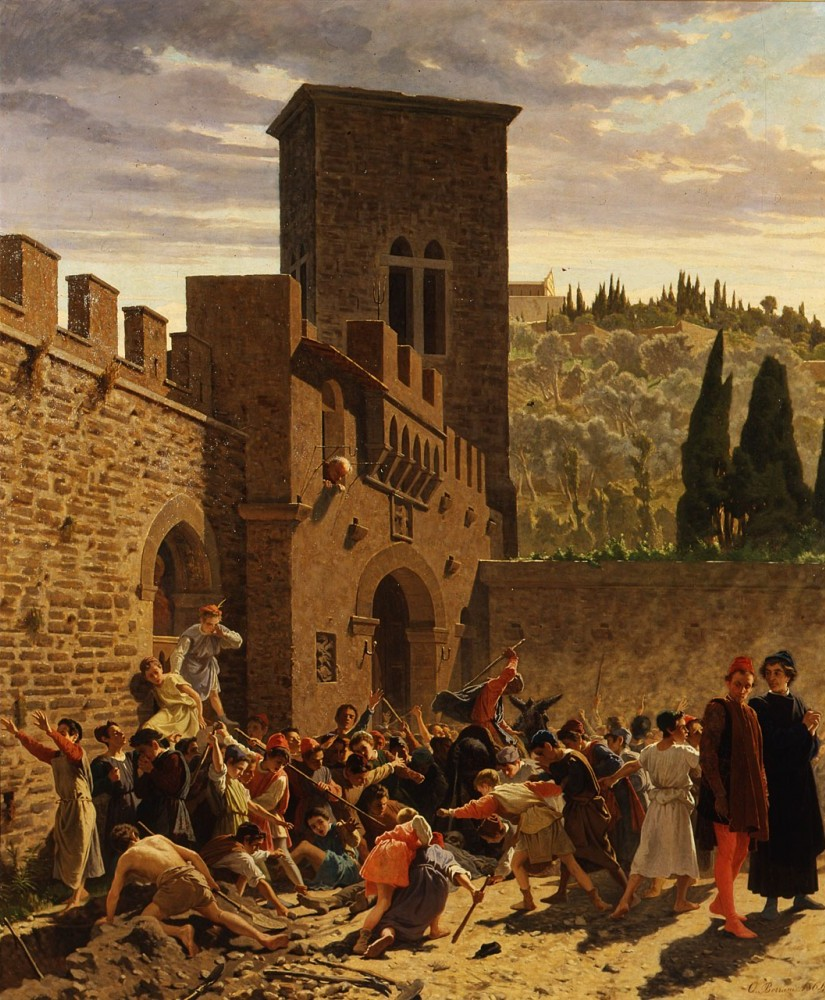
- Il cadavere di Jacopo de' Pazzi, oil painting by Odoardo Borrani, 1864
- Born: Jacopo di Andrea de' Pazzi; 1423; Florence, Republic of Florence
- Died: 28 April 1478 (aged 54–55); Florence, Republic of Florence
- Cause of death: Death by hanging
- Occupation: Banker
- Known for: Acting as one of the leaders of the Pazzi conspiracy to assassinate the ruler of Florence, Lorenzo de' Medici, and his brother, Giuliano.
- Spouse: Maddalena Serristori
- Children: Caterina de' Pazzi (illegitime)
- Parents: Andrea de' Pazzi (father); Caterina Salviati (mother)
- Family: Pazzi

Jacopo de' Pazzi (1423 – 28 April 1478) was a Florentine banker who became head of the Pazzi family in 1464, and was the younger child of Andrea de' Pazzi and Costanza de' Bardi. He commissioned Palazzo Pazzi between 1462 and 1472. Stefano di Ser Niccolo da Bagnone served as a secretary to Jacopo and tutor to his daughter Caterina. He was killed alongside his nephews Francesco and Renato after the failed Pazzi conspiracy, which was a plot to remove the Medici family from power in Florence.

The conspiracy was proposed in Montughi, at Jacopo's villa, when several individuals dissatisfied with the Medici's rule over the Florentine Republic met to plan the assassination of Lorenzo and Giuliano de' Medici, which would allow them to take over the government of Florence. On 26 April 1478, Easter Sunday, the conspirators attempted to kill Lorenzo and Giuliano while the pair were attending High Mass at the Santa Maria del Fiore cathedral; Giuliano was stabbed to death, but Lorenzo was only wounded and managed to escape to safety. After the failed assassination attempt, Jacopo went home and found Francesco with a wound in one leg, possibly self-inflicted. With 100 armed men, Jacopo then ran through the streets of Florence crying "Liberty!", but when Francesco was dragged from his bed and hanged, Jacopo fled the city.

While hiding in the village of Castagno, he was recognised and sent back to Florence, where he was tortured and hanged next to the decomposing body of fellow Pazzi conspirator Francesco Salviati. After being buried at Santa Croce, Jacopo's body was dug up, thrown in a ditch, dragged through the streets, and propped up at the door of the Palazzo Pazzi, where his head was mockingly used as a door knocker. After that, his body was thrown into the Arno, where it was retrieved by children, hung from a willow tree, flogged, and thrown back into the river.

== In popular culture ==
Jacopo de' Pazzi appears as an antagonist in the video game Assassin's Creed II, in which he is portrayed as an elderly man rather than middle-aged and is a member of the Templar Order. After Lorenzo de' Medici is saved by protagonist Ezio Auditore during the Pazzi conspiracy, Jacopo flees Florence and hides out in San Gimignano until 1480, when he is mortally wounded by the Templar grandmaster Rodrigo Borgia during a Templar meeting for his failure to dispose of the Medici. Ezio, who had followed Jacopo to the meeting, then proceeds to put him out of his misery.

Sean Bean portrays Jacopo de' Pazzi in the second season of the drama series Medici: Masters of Florence.

== Bibliography ==
- Hibbert, Christopher (1979) [1974]. The Rise and Fall of the House of Medici. Harmondsworth, Middlesex: Penguin UK. p. 368. ISBN 0140050906. JSTOR 30089955.
- Kohl, Benjamin G.; Witt, Ronald Gene; Welles, Elizabeth B. (1978). "The Pazzi Conspiracy". In Poliziano, Angelo (ed.). The Earthly Republic: Italian Humanists on Government and Society. University of Pennsylvania Press. p. 337. ISBN 9780812210972.
