= Bianca de' Medici =

Italian noblewoman (1445–1505)

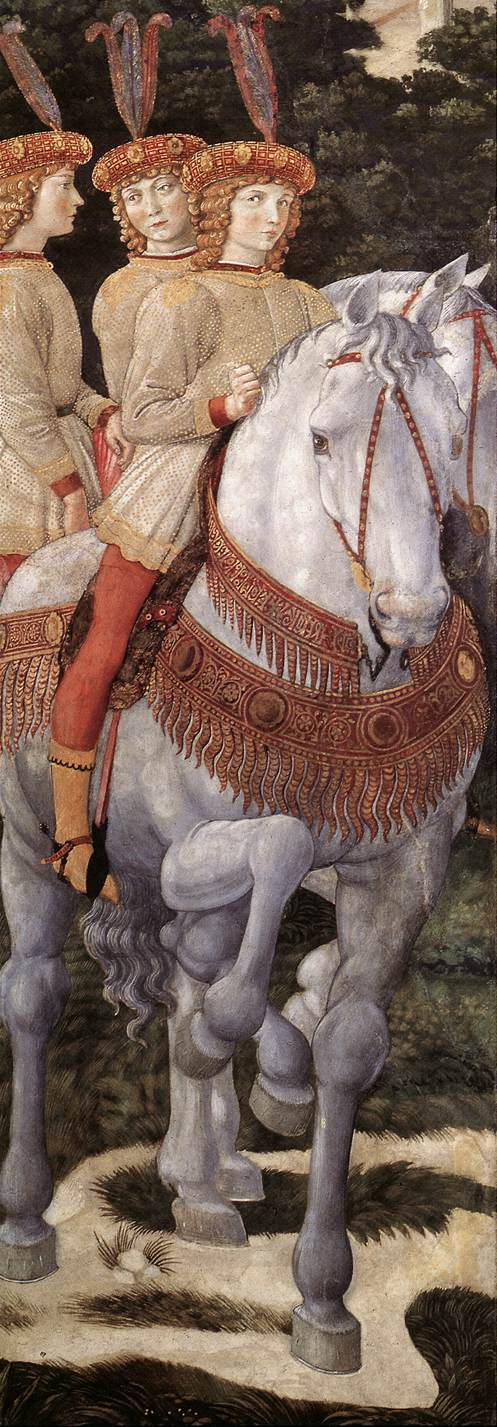
- Detail of the Journey of the Magi, fresco by Benozzo Gozzoli, sometimes thought to show Bianca between her sisters Maria and Nannina
- Born: Bianca Maria di Piero de' Medici; 10 September 1445; Republic of Florence
- Died: 20 July 1505 (aged 59)
- Noble family: House of Medici
- Spouse: Guglielmo de' Pazzi
- Issue: Sixteen children
- Father: Piero di Cosimo de' Medici
- Mother: Lucrezia Tornabuoni

Bianca Maria di Piero de' Medici (10 September 1445– 20 July 1505) was a member of the de' Medici family, de facto rulers of Florence in the late 15th century. She was the daughter of Piero di Cosimo de' Medici, de facto ruler of the Florentine Republic, and sister of Lorenzo de' Medici, who succeeded his father in that position. She married Guglielmo de' Pazzi, a member of the Pazzi family. She was a musician, and played the organ for Pope Pius II and the future Pope Alexander VI in 1460; she was a landowner.

== Life ==
Bianca was a daughter of Piero di Cosimo de' Medici and Lucrezia Tornabuoni. In 1459, she married Guglielmo de' Pazzi, who was a childhood friend of her brother, Lorenzo de' Medici. This alliance was intended to help resolve the animosity between the families, but it was not successful in that regard as Machiavelli noted in his Florentine Histories. Their first child, Antonio, was born in 1460. The marriage agreement included a significant reduction in taxes imposed on the Pazzi family. In the aftermath of the Pazzi conspiracy of 1478, Bianca's marriage significantly softened Lorenzo's wrath towards Guglielmo, who was only put under house arrest for a time, while his male relatives were exiled or executed; his daughters were exempted from the marriage ban imposed on other Pazzi daughters.

In 1460, Bianca was asked to play the organ for Pope Pius II and his entourage during a visit to Florence, as the pope was coming back from the Council of Mantua. Teodoro Montefeltro, the Apostolic protonotary travelling with the pope, praised the performance in a letter to Barbara of Brandenburg, Marquise of Mantua. During the same papal visit, she performed a second concert for the future pope Rodrigo Borgia at his request. Bianca often performed for local and visiting dignitaries, contributing to her families' reputation and influence.

In 1475, Bianca asked her mother to purchase farmland from other relatives for her, as Lucrezia had more influence within the family. Though Bianca owned the property, it was managed by staff employed by her mother.

== Issue ==
Bianca and Guglielmo had sixteen children, nine sons and seven daughters:

1. Antonio de' Pazzi (1460), died as an infant
2. Giovanna de' Pazzi, married Tommaso Monaldi in 1471
3. Contessina de' Pazzi, married Giuliano Salviati in 1476
4. Antonio de' Pazzi (1462-1528), ambassador and politician, Gonfaloniere di Giustizia in 1521, second Lord of Civitella
5. Alessandra de' Pazzi (1465), married Bartolomeo Buondelmonti in 1486
6. Cosimo de' Pazzi (1466-1513), archbishop of Florence from 1508 until his death
7. Piero de' Pazzi (1468), died as an infant
8. Lorenzo Alessandro de' Pazzi, (1470-1535) merchant, patron of the arts and latinist
9. Cosa de' Pazzi, married Francesco di Luca Capponi
10. Renato de' Pazzi, goldsmith merchant
11. Lorenzo de' Pazzi, politician and ambassador
12. Luigia de' Pazzi, married Folco di Edoardo Portinari in 1494
13. Maddalena de' Pazzi, married Ormanozzo Deti in 1497
14. Alessandro de' Pazzi (1483-1530) ambassador, literate and greekist
15. Lucrezia de' Pazzi, married Cattani di Diacceto, and then a member of Martelli family (1500)
16. Giuliano de' Pazzi (1486-1517), doctor of law, abbot and canon of the Metropolitan of Florence

== Sources ==
- Ewart, K. Dorothea (2006). Cosimo De' Medici. Cosimo, Inc. ISBN 9781596059313.
- Machiavelli, Niccolò (1845). The Florentine Histories. Translated by Lester, C. Edwards. New York: Paine and Burgess.
- Pernis, Maria Grazia; Adams, Laurie (2006). Lucrezia Tornabuoni De' Medici and the Medici Family in the Fifteenth Century. Peter Lang. ISBN 9780820476452.
- Prizer, William F. (1991). "Games of Venus: Secular Vocal Music in the Late Quattrocento and Early Cinquecento". The Journal of Musicology. 9 (1). University of California Press: 3–56. doi:10.2307/763832. JSTOR 763832.
- Tomas, Natalie R. (2003). The Medici Women: Gender and Power in Renaissance Florence. Aldershot: Ashgate. ISBN 0754607771.
