= Antonio Rossellino =

Italian sculptor

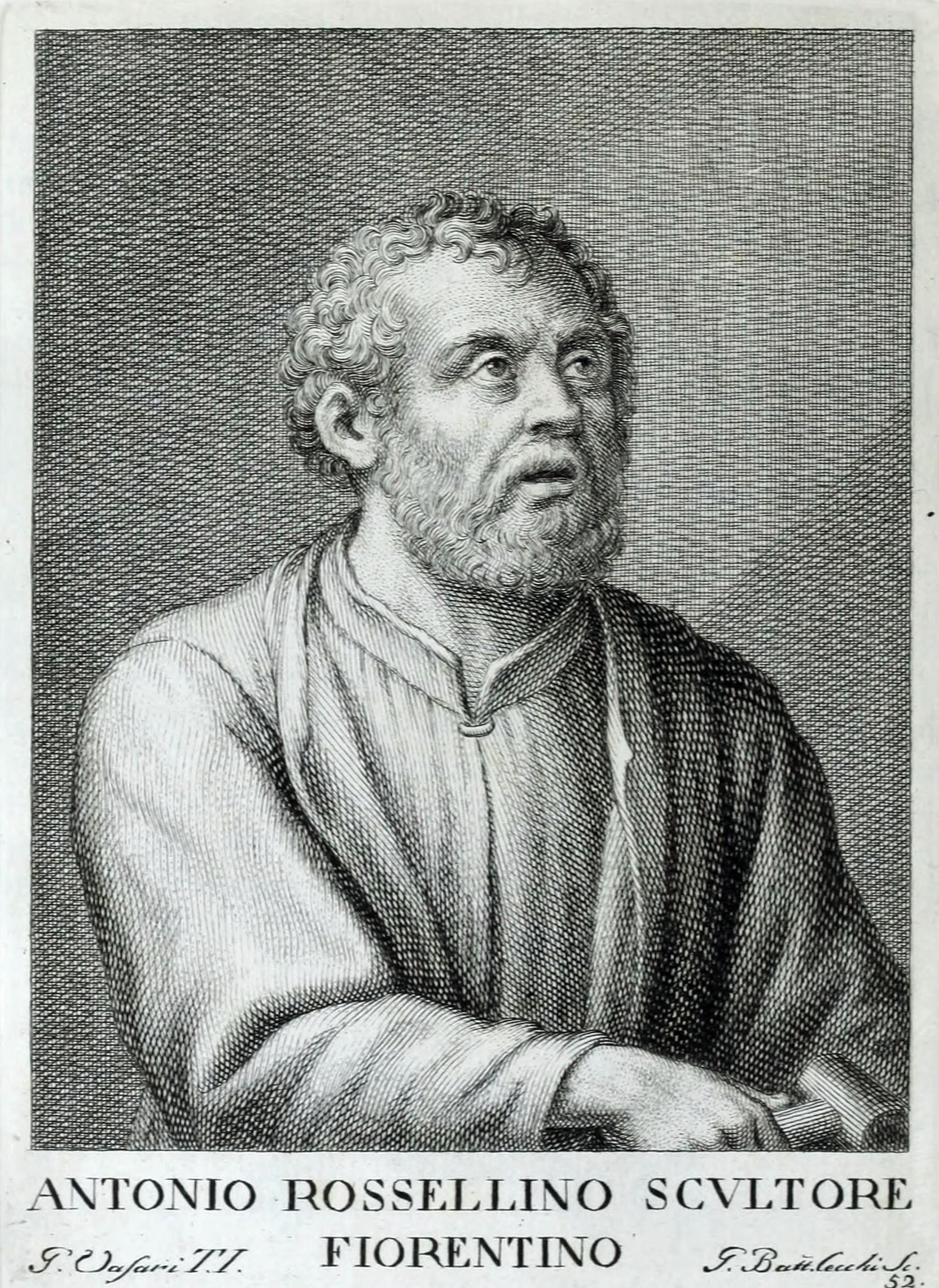
Antonio Rossellino

Antonio Gamberelli (1427–1479), nicknamed Antonio Rossellino for the colour of his hair, was an Italian Renaissance sculptor. His older brother, from whom he received his formal training, was the sculptor and architect Bernardo Rossellino.

Born in Settignano, now a part of Florence, he was the youngest of five brothers, sculptors and stonecutters. He is said to have studied under Donatello and is remarkable for the sharpness and fineness of his bas-relief. His most important works are the funeral monument of Beato Marcolino (1458) for the Blackfriar Church (today a museum), Forlì, and the monument of Infante James of Coimbra, cardinal of Portugal (died 1459) in the Basilica di San Miniato al Monte, Florence (1461–1467 or 1466).

The portrait bust of Matteo Palmieri in the Bargello is signed and dated 1468. In 1470 he made the monument for Maria d'Aragona Duchess of Amalfi, in the Piccolomini chapel in Sant'Anna dei Lombardi in Naples; the relief of the Nativity over the altar in the same place is also probably his. A statue of John the Baptist as a boy is in the Bargello; also a delicate relief of the Madonna and Child, an Ecce Homo, and a bust of Francesco Sassetti. The so-called Madonna del Latte on a pillar in the Church of Santa Croce is a memorial to Francesco Nori, who fell by the stab intended for Lorenzo de' Medici. Other reliefs of the Madonna and Child are in the Via della Spada, Florence, and in the Victoria and Albert Museum, London. In the latter place is the bust of Giovanni di San Miniato, a doctor of arts and medicine, signed and dated 1456. Working in conjunction with Mino da Fiesole, Rossellino executed the reliefs of the Assumption of Mary and the Martyrdom of St. Stephen for the pulpit at Prato. A marble bust of the boy Baptist in the Pinacoteca, Faenza, and a Christ Child in the Louvre are attributed to Rossellino by some authorities.

Giorgio Vasari includes a biography of Rossellino in his Lives.

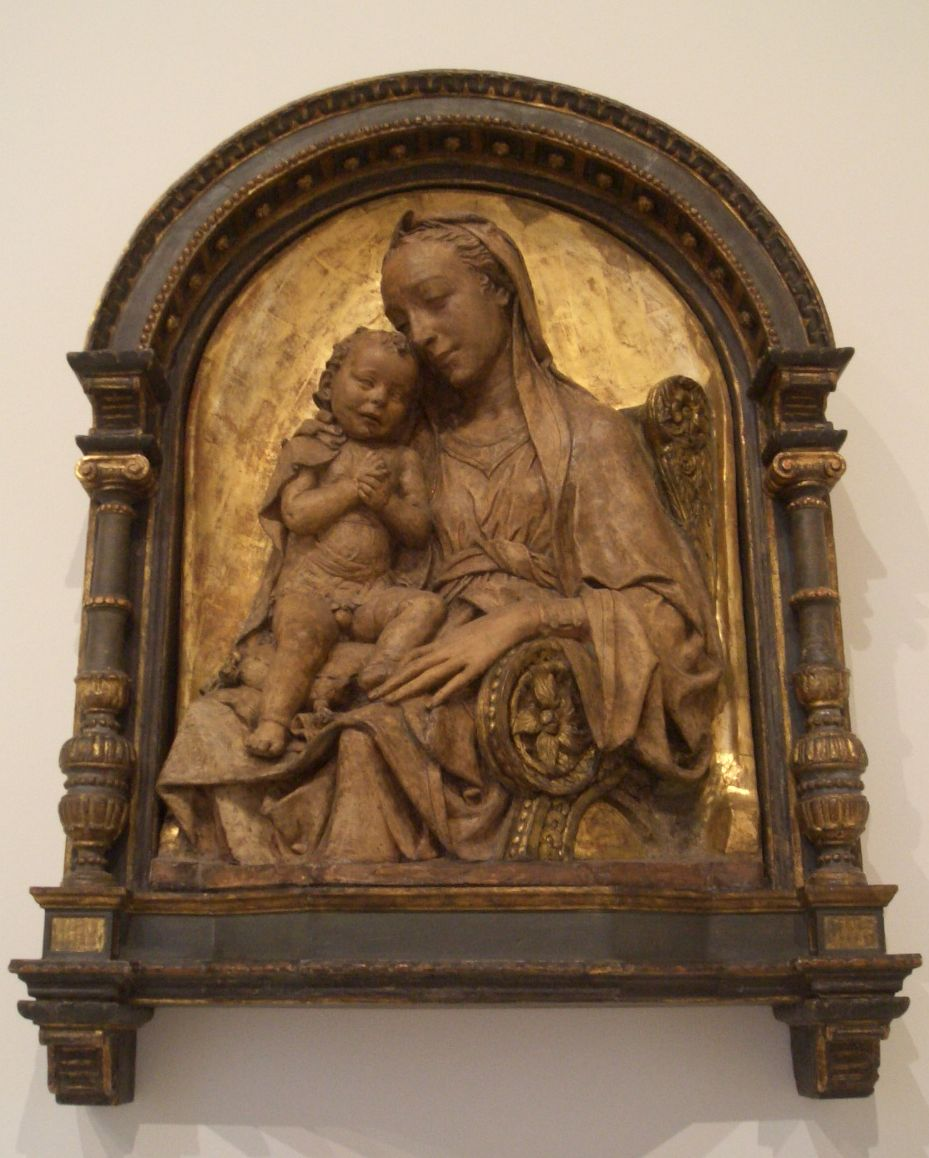
Madonna and Child, terracotta part gilded (Berlin).

== References and sources ==
This article incorporates text from the 1913 Catholic Encyclopedia article "Antonio di Matteo di Domenico Rosselino" by M.L. Handley, a publication now in the public domain.
