= Palazzo Pazzi =

Renaissance palace architecture

Coordinates: 43.7713°N 11.2581°E

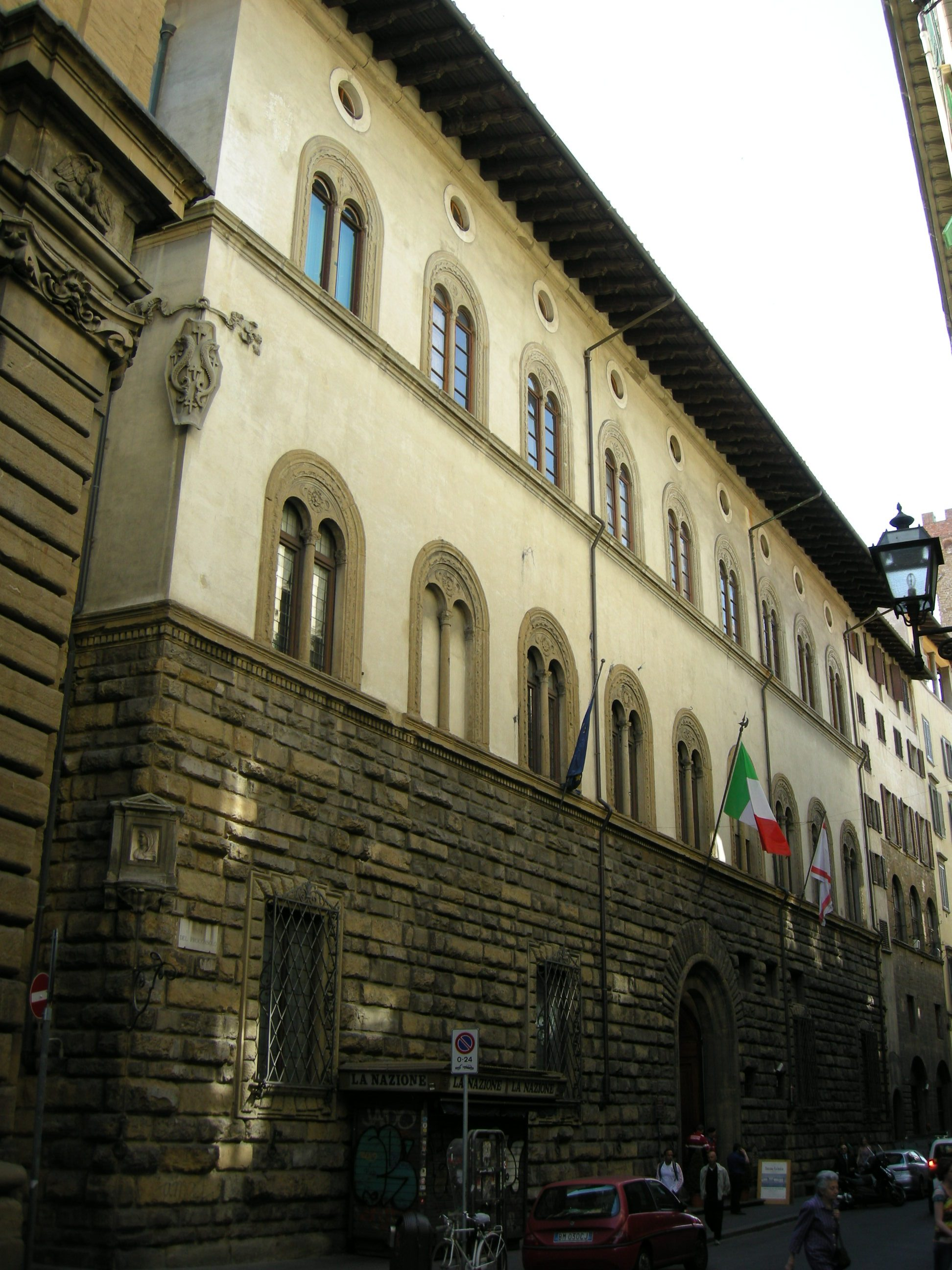
Facade of palace with coat of arms at corner

The Palazzo Pazzi, also known as the Palazzo della Congiura or Palazzo Pazzi-Quaratesi, is a Renaissance-style palace. It is located on Via del Proconsolo 10 at the corner with Borgo Albizzi in Florence, region of Tuscany, Italy. The palace is between the Palazzo Nonfinito and the Palazzo Pazzi-Ammannati to the north.

== History ==
This palace was commissioned by Jacopo de' Pazzi, and built between 1458 and 1469 in an area mainly occupied by the Pazzi family, Canto Pazzi. The architect of the palace was Giuliano da Maiano, though it has in the past been attributed to Michelozzo di Bartolomeo or Filippo Brunelleschi.

The palace was confiscated by the Medici after the failure of the Pazzi Conspiracy (Congiura di Pazzi). Jacopo de' Pazzi was executed by mobs after the failed coup. The palace became property of the French family of d'Estonville, then of the Cybo family (1487). Acquired in 1594 by the Strozzi and then the Quaratesi from 1760 to 1843. In 1850, it became the host of judicial courts: the Tribunale della Suprema Corte di Cassazione. When Florence was briefly capital of Italy during 1865–1871, the palace housed the Prussian ambassador Karl George Ludwig von Usedow and his legation.

In 1913 the palace was acquired and refurbished by the Banca di Firenze, who commissioned the architects Ezio Cerpi and Adolfo Coppedè (1913–1915). They roofed the courtyard and added ceramic and stained glass decorations by Chino and Galileo Chini. In 1931, it was acquired by the Istituto Nazionale della Previdenza Sociale.

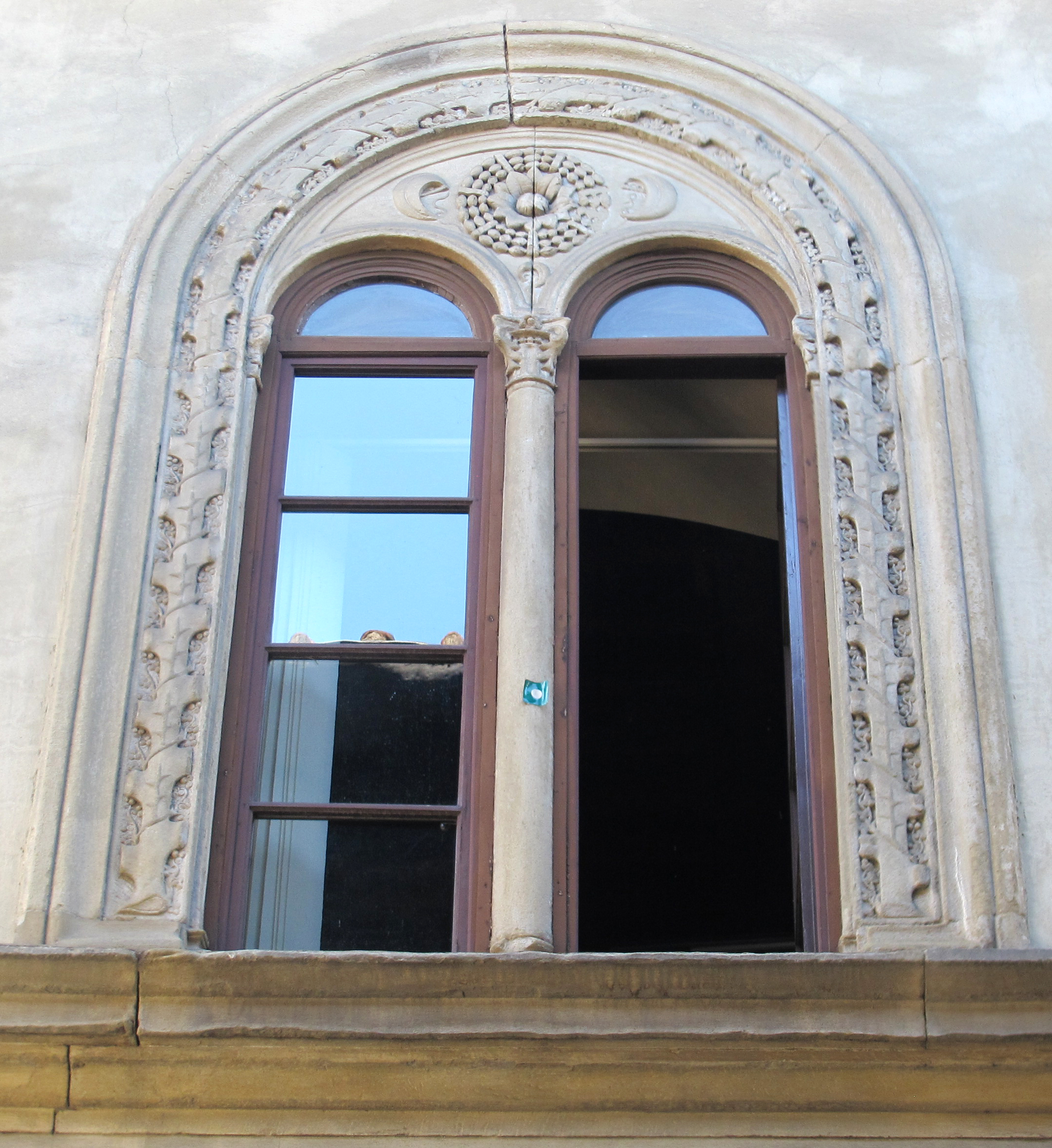
Mullioned windows and lunette reliefs

The rusticated stone bricks made of yellow-ochre sandstone pietra forte on the ground floor give way to pale stucco walls on the second floor (Piano Nobile) with finely decorated mullioned windows with rounded arches. In the lunette, above the windows are flowers flanked by billowing sails, the latter in reference to the Pazzi maritime enterprises. At the south corner of Via Proconsolo is a copy of the coat of arms of the Pazzi family, the original sculpted by Donatello, which at one time had been hidden. Similar heraldic symbols, two gilded dolphins back to back around a flaming cup, are in the capitals of the courtyard columns.

The flaming cup is included in the coat of arms, because tradition held that in 1101 a Pazzi ancestor, Pazzino de' Pazzi, was among the first Christians to scale the walls and lead to the capture of Jerusalem during the First Crusade. In honor of his bravery, he was given three stones or flints (Pietre del Santo Sepolcro) from the Holy Sepulchre. These were putatively used to light the lamps of the tomb when Jesus was buried. The items are now stored in Santi Apostoli and linked to the elaborate ceremony of the Lo Scoppio del Carro and the lighting of fireworks from the Portafuoco.

== Images ==
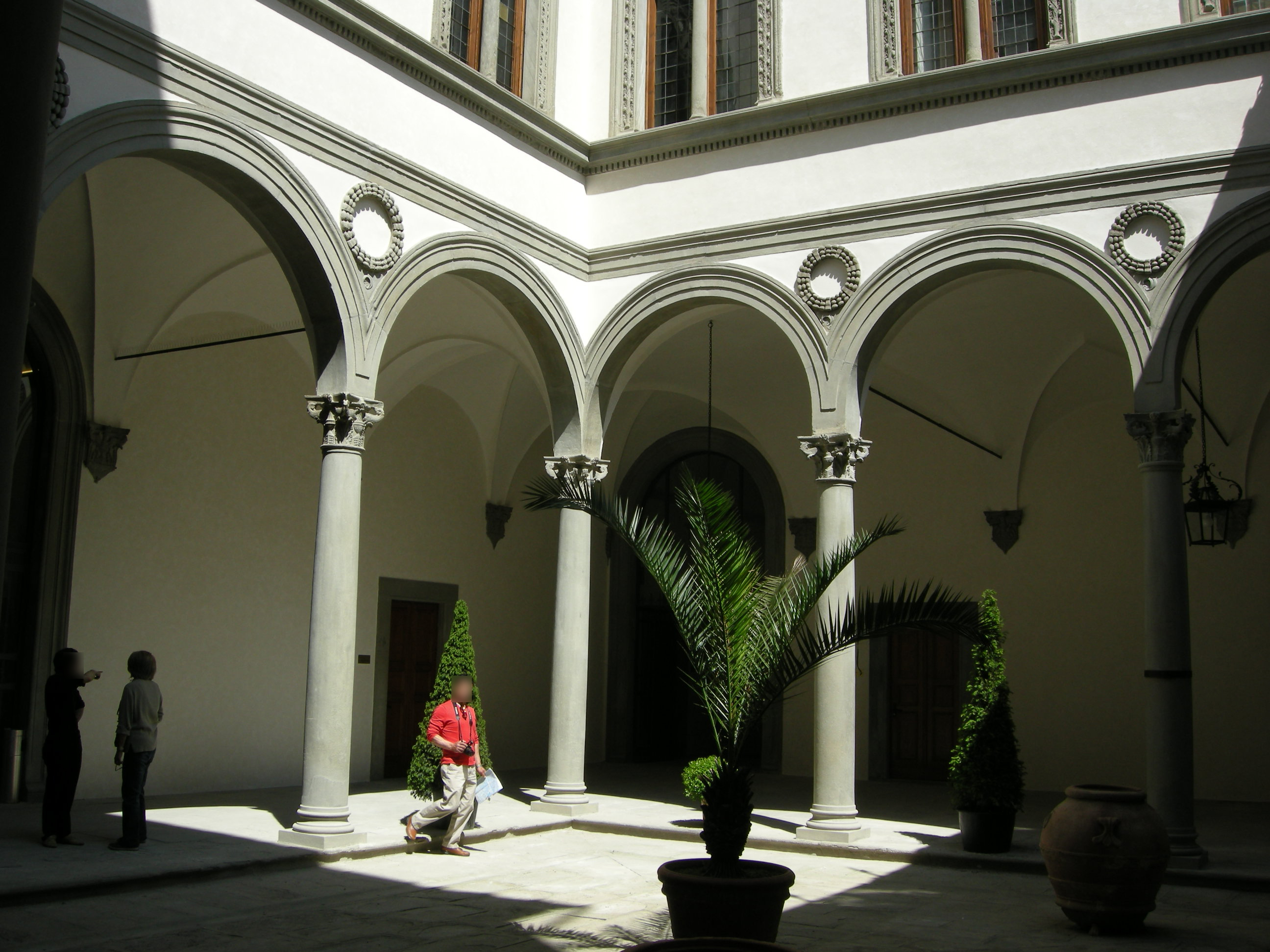
Courtyard

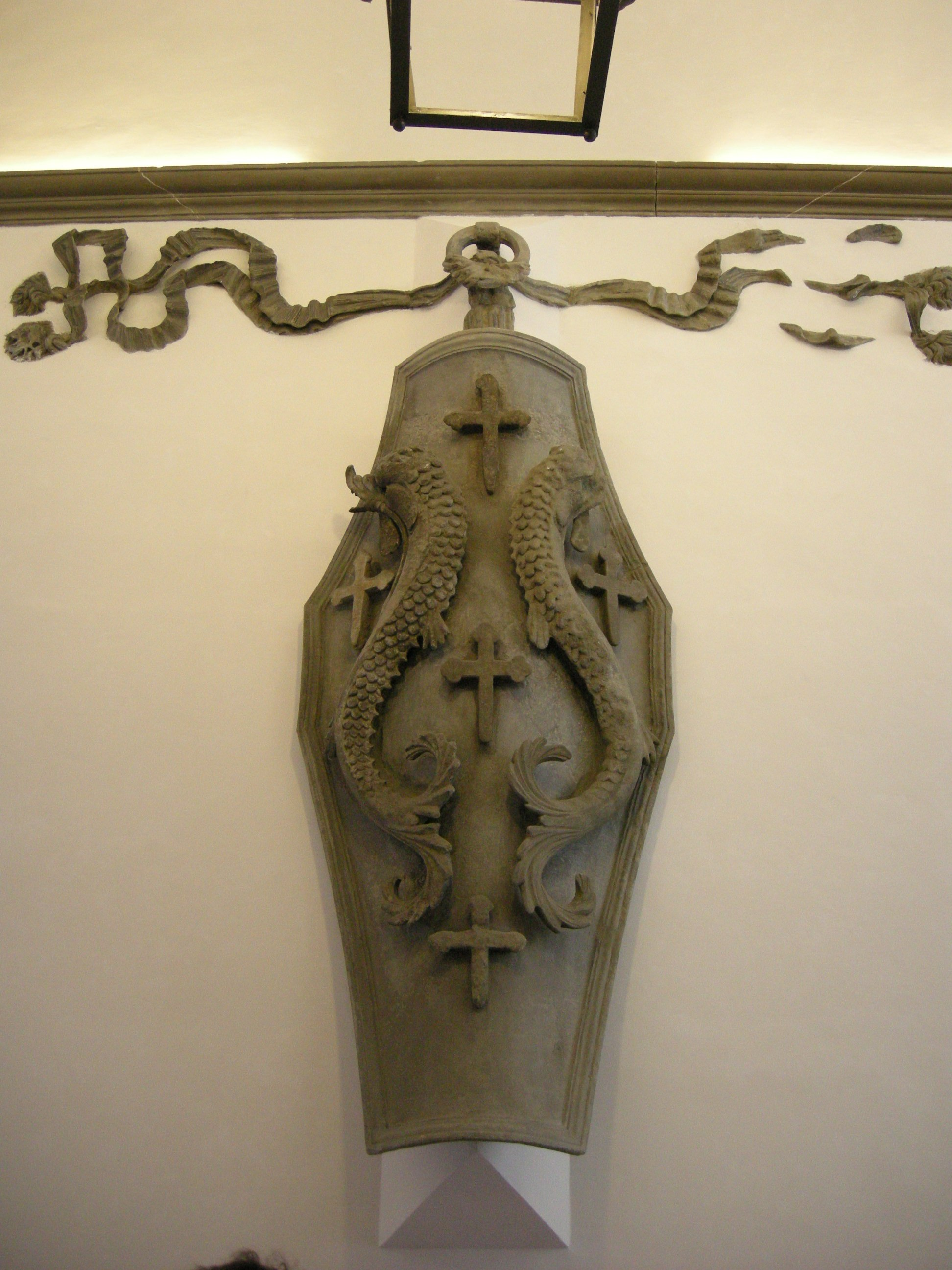
Pazzi arms, attributed to Donatello
