= Palazzo Nonfinito =

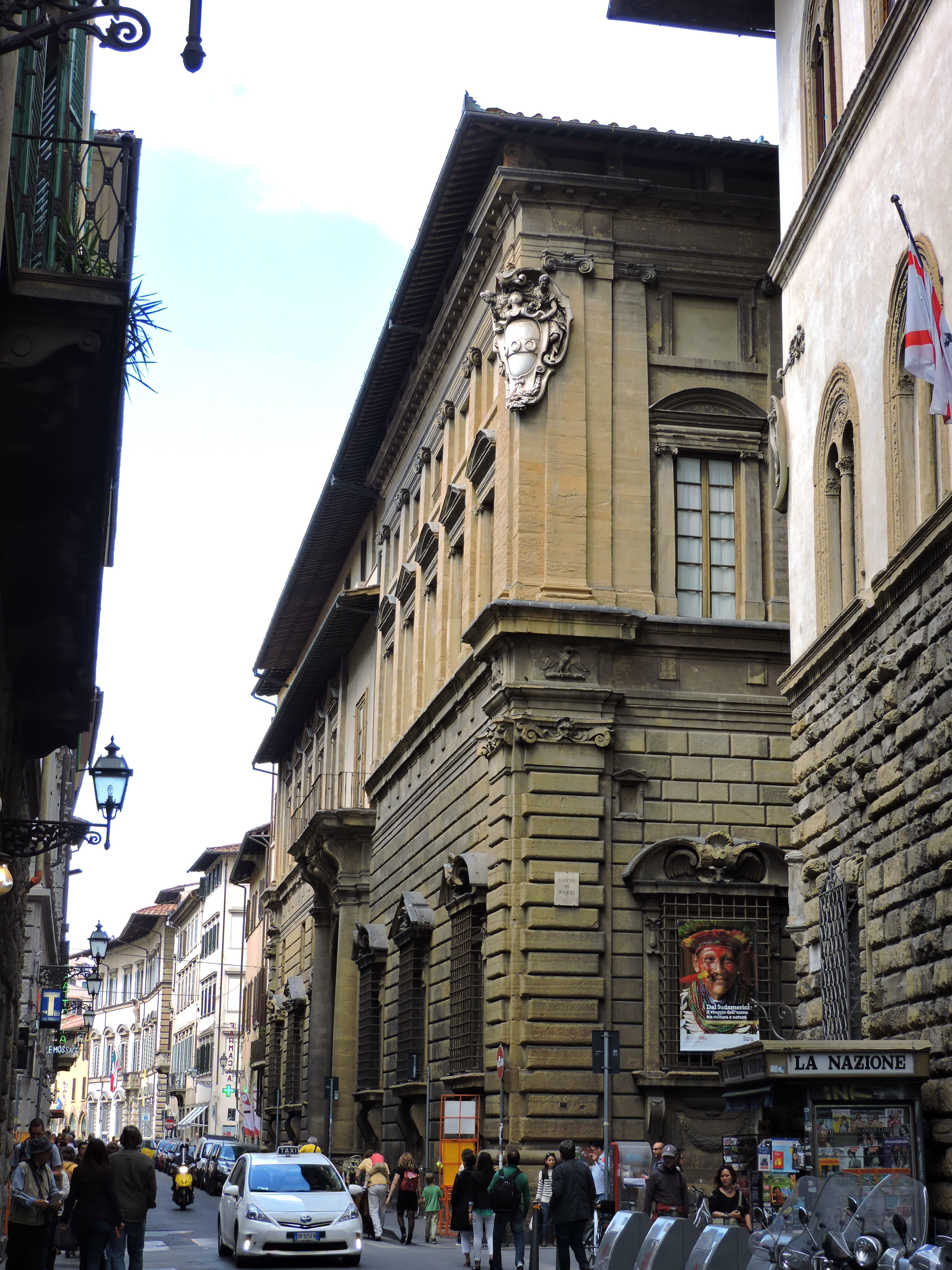
- Interactive map of the Palazzo Nonfinito area

General information
- Architectural style: Mannerist
- Location: Via del Proconsolo, 12; Florence, Italy
- Coordinates: 43.7717°N 11.2584°E
- Current tenants: Museum of Natural History of Florence
- Construction started: 1593

Design and construction
- Architect: Bernardo Buontalenti

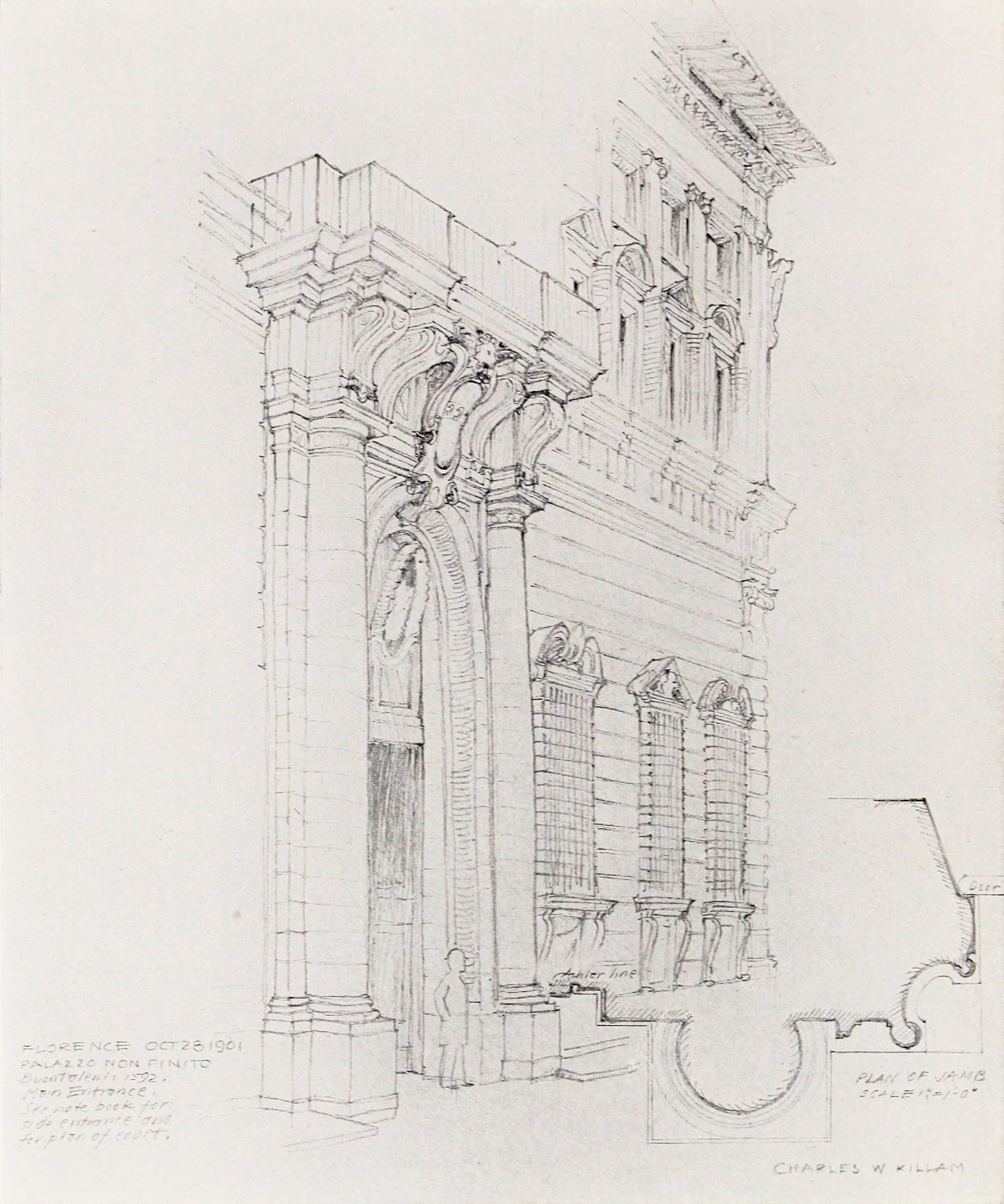
1901 sketch by Charles Wilson Killam

The Palazzo Nonfinito (Italian: lit. Unfinished Palace) is a Mannerist-style palace located on Via del Proconsolo #12, (corner with Via del Corso) in central Florence, region of Tuscany, Italy. Begun in 1593 using designs by the architect Bernardo Buontalenti, only the ground floor was completed, and additional construction was added later by different architects. The palace houses the Anthropology and Ethnology section of the Museum of Natural History of Florence.

== History ==
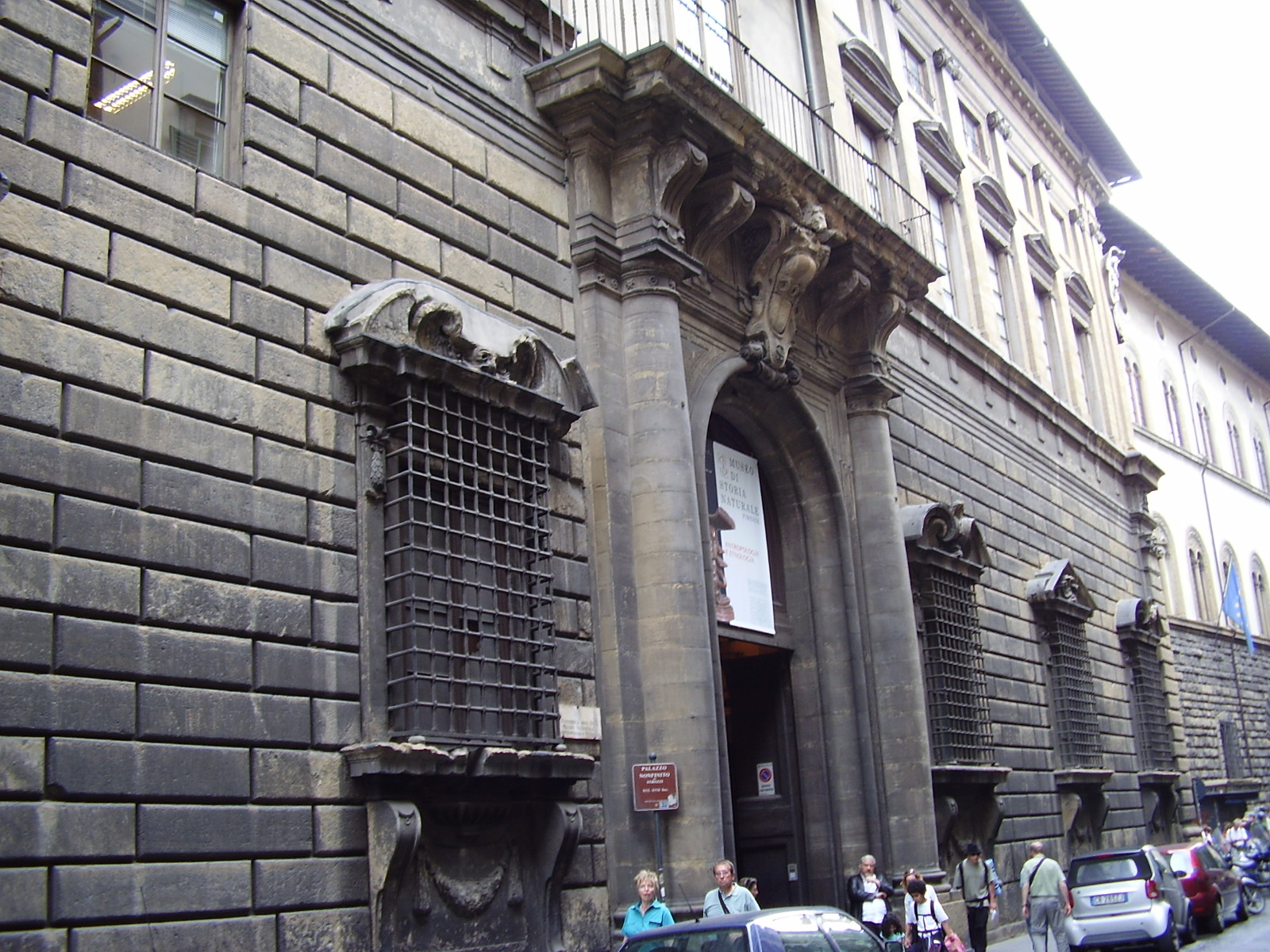
The façade

In 1592, Alessandro Strozzi commissioned construction at the site on lands that had originally belonged, among others, to the Pazzi family. This palace is separated by an alley from the Renaissance-style Palazzo Pazzi.

The architect Bernardo Buontalenti and his pupil Matteo Nigetti worked on the ground floor (1592-1600), which is characterized by Mannerist touches in the window cartouches and brackets, as well as the side portal. The façade has a heraldic shield of the Strozzi family.

The recruitment of the artists Santi di Tito to construct the entrance staircase, prompted the other architects to resign the enterprise. The main entrance on Via Proconsolo was built by Giovanni Battista Caccini, with designs by Vincenzo Scamozzi (1600-1612). Ludovico Cardi helped design the courtyard (1604).

After Caccini's death, construction was continued by Negretti, but the palace remained incomplete and thus garnered its name of nonfinito. The palace became property of the Guasti family, and in 1814, it became property of the Government, and was used for offices of the state. During the brief period Florence was the capital of Italy, it served as the home of the Council of State.

In 1919, it was made the house of the Museum of Anthropology and Ethnology, founded by Paolo Mantegazza, and pertaining to the Università degli Studi di Firenze. Mantegazza's bust, by Ettore Ximenes is located near the entrance. Nello Puccioni and Aldobrandino Mochi also contributed to the monument.

== Anthropology and Ethnology Section of the Museum of Natural History ==
The museum was founded in 1869 by the anthropologist and collector Paolo Mantegazza. The collection includes objects from the Medici inventories, some donated by explorers to the corners of the world. The eclectic items include Inca mummies from Peru; kimono from Japan; skull trophies from New Guinea, and other objects. A collection of objects from India were collected by the orientalist Angelo De Gubernatis.
