= Bernardo Bandini Baroncelli =

Italian merchant, instigator of the Pazzi conspiracy (1420–1479)

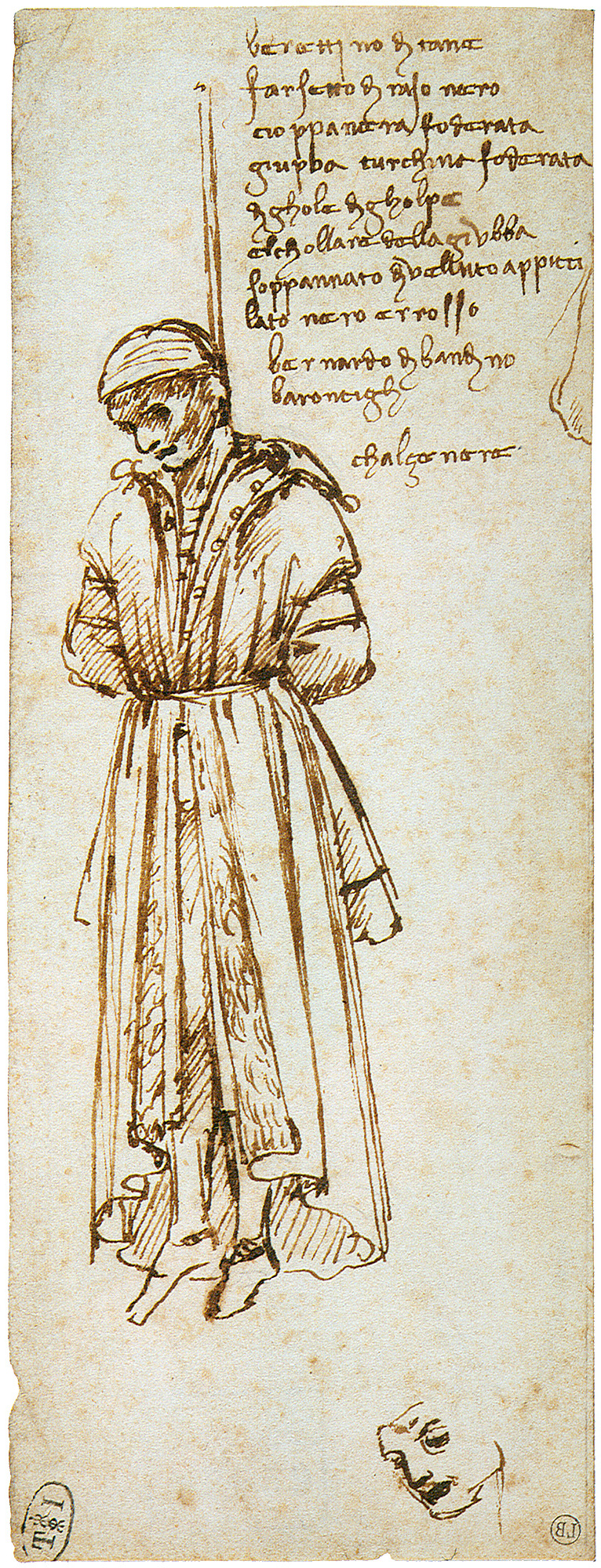
- Hanging of Bernardo Baroncelli in Florence by Leonardo da Vinci
- Born: Bernardo Bandini dei Baroncelli; 15 January 1420; Florence, Republic of Florence
- Died: 29 December 1479 (aged 59); Florence, Republic of Florence
- Cause of death: Execution by Hanging
- Occupation: Merchant

Details
- Victims: Giuliano de' Medici
- Date: 26 April 1478
- Country: Italy
- Location: Duomo of Florence
- Target: Medici
- Killed: Giuliano de' Medici
- Injured: Lorenzo de' Medici
- Weapon: Knife

Bernardo Bandini Baroncelli (15 January 1420 – 29 December 1479) was a Florentine merchant and a protagonist in the Pazzi conspiracy, a plot to remove the Medici family from power in Florence.

== Life ==
Bandini dei Baroncelli was born in Florence on 15 January 1420, the son of Lagia di Gaspare Bonciani and Giovanni di Piero Bandini dei Baroncelli. His father died when he was young – certainly before 1427 – and he was brought up by his mother and his elder brother Giovanni. He became a merchant. He married Giovanna di Goffredo de Biros, with whom he had a daughter, Beatrice.

== The Pazzi Conspiracy ==
He is remembered principally for his participation in the Pazzi Conspiracy, a plot by the Pazzi and Salviati families to assassinate Lorenzo de' Medici and his younger brother Giuliano. The attempt took place during High Mass in the Duomo of Florence on Easter Sunday, 26 April 1478. Giuliano was stabbed to death by Baroncelli and Franceso de' Pazzi, but Lorenzo was only wounded by the other conspirators and managed to escape; Baroncelli also killed a Medici retainer, Francesco Nori.

After the failure of the plot, Baroncelli fled Italy, but was eventually found and arrested in Constantinople. Antonio Medici was sent to bring him from Constantinople back to Florence, where Baroncelli, still wearing his Turkish robes, was ultimately hanged on 29 December 1479 at the Palazzo del Bargello.

Baroncelli's execution was depicted in a macabre sketch drawn by Leonardo da Vinci while he was in Florence in 1479. Da Vinci even noted the colors of the robes that Baroncelli was wearing at the time of his death in his typical mirror writing.

== In culture ==
Baroncelli appears as a tenor in the opera I Medici by Ruggero Leoncavallo (1893).

Baroncelli appears as a Templar in Assassin's Creed II.
