= Antonio Maffei da Volterra =

Italian presbyter (1450 - 1478)

Personal details
- Born: 1450 Volterra, Republic of Florence
- Died: 3 May 1478 (aged 27–28) Florence, Republic of Florence
- Occupation: Presbyter

Antonio Maffei da Volterra (1450 – 3 May 1478) was an Italian presbyter, clergyman, and papal notary. He was born into a noble family in the town of Volterra, then part of the Florentine Republic ruled by the Medici family. He is best remembered for the role he played in the Pazzi conspiracy, a plot to remove the Medici from power by those dissatisfied with their rule. Maffei was exasperated against Lorenzo since the sacking of Volterra.

On Easter Sunday, 26 April 1478, Maffei and other conspirators attempted to assassinate Lorenzo de' Medici and his brother Giuliano inside the Santa Maria del Fiore cathedral in Florence. Together with fellow conspirator Stefano da Bagnone, Maffei tried to strangle Lorenzo and managed to wound him in the throat. However, while Giuliano was successfully killed, Lorenzo survived his injuries. After the failure of the assassination plot, Maffei found refuge in the Badia Fiorentina church in Florence, but was later arrested and hanged from the Palazzo della Signoria on 3 May.

== In popular culture ==
Antonio Maffei is featured as a minor antagonist in the video game Assassin's Creed II, in which he is depicted as a member of the Templar Order, who within the game's storyline are responsible for the Pazzi conspiracy. Rather than being executed in Florence after the failure of the plot, he flees to San Gimignano, where he is later assassinated by Ezio Auditore. Maffei also makes a minor appearance in the game's prequel film, Assassin's Creed Lineage, played by Shawn Baichoo.
