= Museo di Storia Naturale di Firenze =

Florence Museum of Natural History
- Museo di Storia Naturale di Firenze
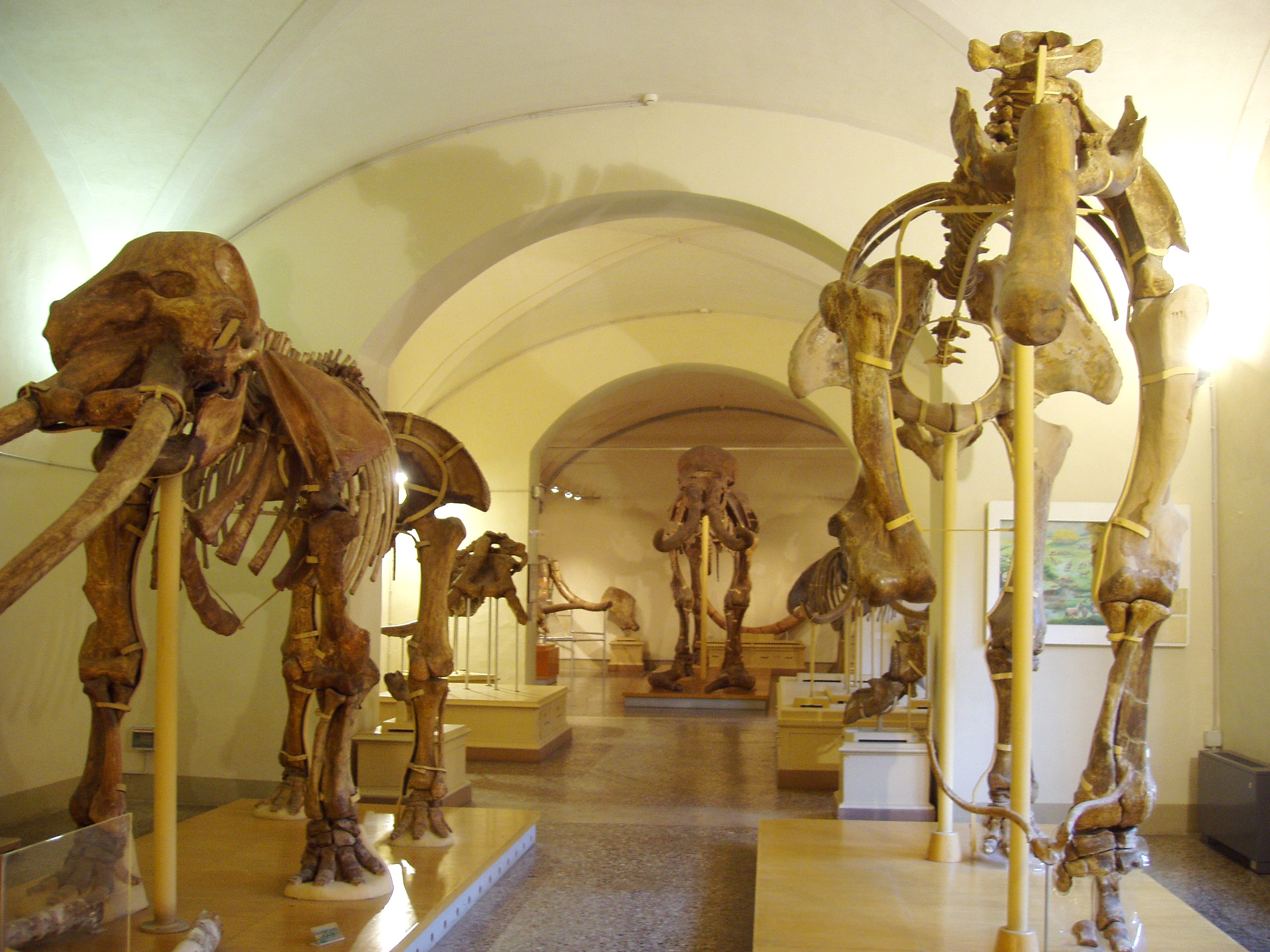
- Fossils in the Museo di Geologia e Paleontologia
- Established: February 21, 1775
- Location: Florence, Italy
- Type: natural history museum
- Website: www.msn.unifi.it

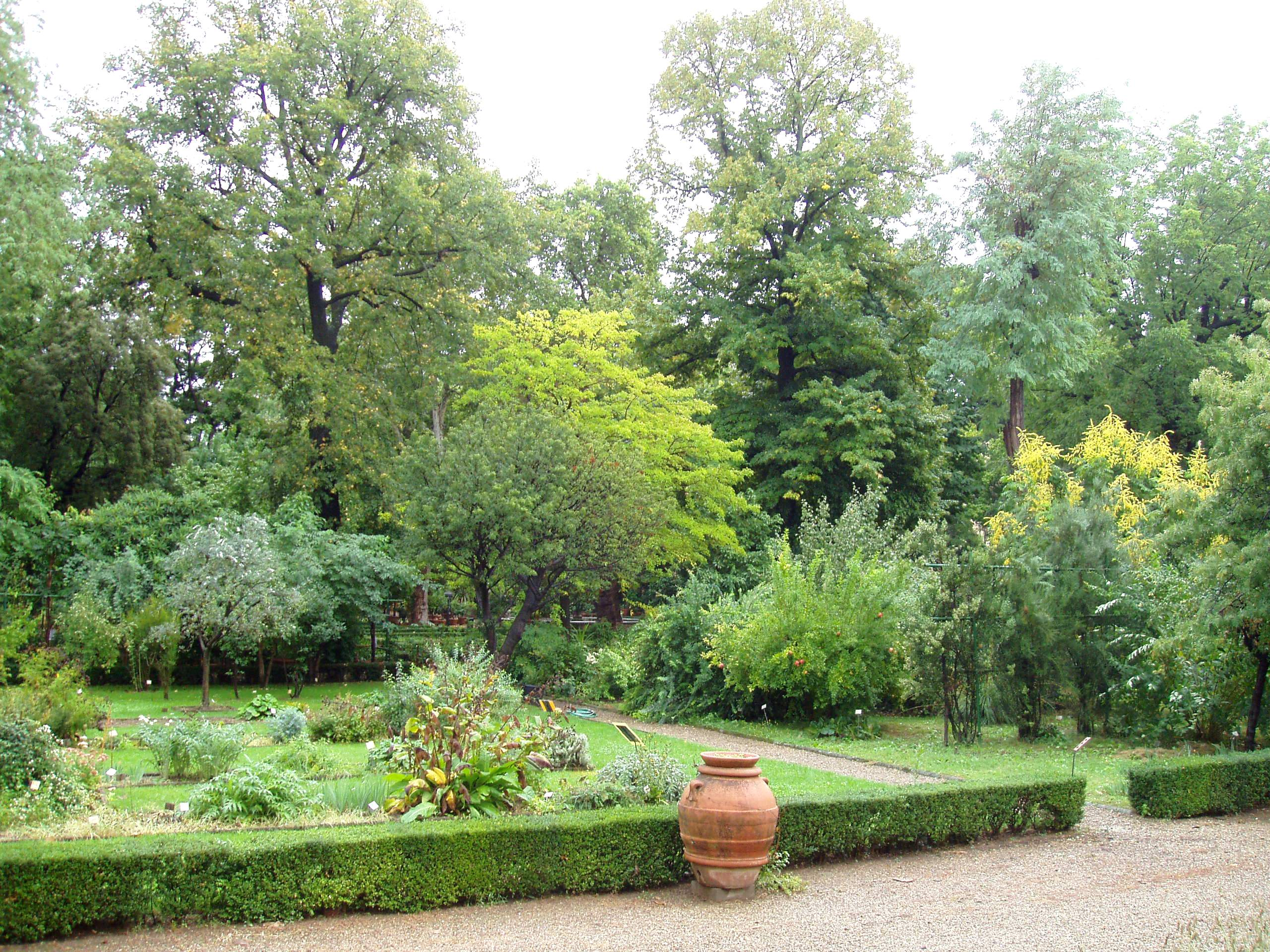
Giardino dei Semplici

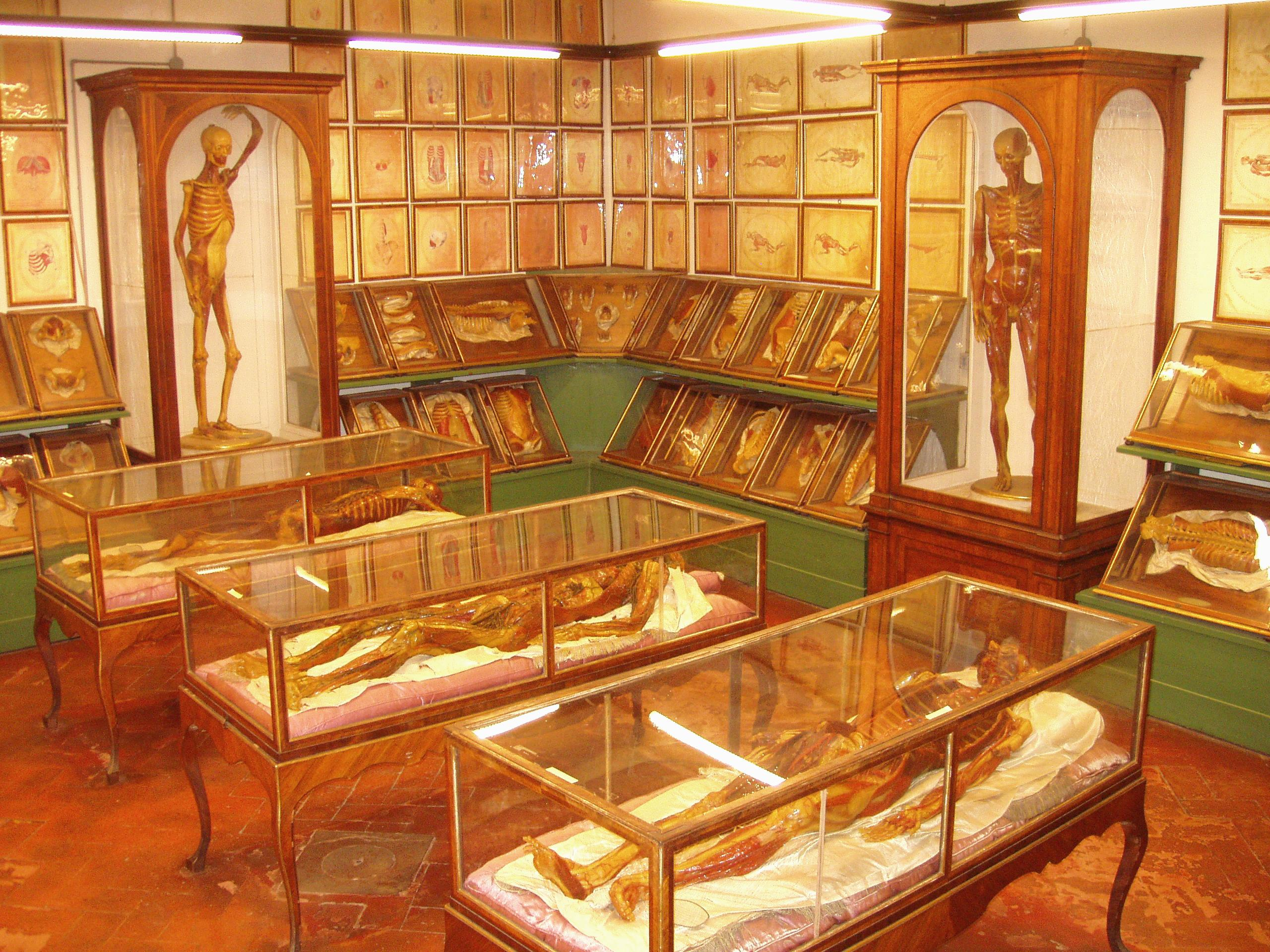
Wax anatomical models in the Zoologia "La Specola"

The Museo di Storia Naturale di Firenze is a natural history museum in 6 major collections, located in Florence, Italy. It is part of the University of Florence. Museum collections are open mornings except Wednesday, and all day Saturday; an admission fee is charged.

The museum was established on February 21, 1775 by Grand Duke Pietro Leopoldo as the Imperial Regio Museo di Fisica e Storia Naturale. At that time it consisted of several natural history collections housed within the palazzo Torrigiani on Via Romana. Through the past two centuries, it has grown significantly and now forms one of the finest collections in Italy.

== Collections ==
Today's collections are as follows:

- Giardino dei Semplici (Via Micheli, 3) - Europe's third oldest botanical garden, established in 1545, now containing some 9,000 plant specimens.
- Museo di Botanica (Via La Pira, 4) - a large herbarium of approximately 4 million specimens, including the historic collections of Andrea Cesalpino (1563), claimed to be the first scientific herbarium, Philip Barker Webb, and Odoardo Beccari.
- Museo di Geologia e Paleontologia (Via La Pira, 4) - About 200,000 specimens from the collections of noted geologists and paleontologists (Fucini, Dainelli, Marinelli, De Stefani, Stefanini, D'Ancona, Pecchioli). The vertebrate fossil collection (26,000 specimens) is of particular interest, with mammal fossils from the Pliocene and Pleistocene, primarily recovered from Tuscany and Valdarno, including Oreopithecus bambolii, anthropoid primates, and early elephant skeletons. The paleobotany collection includes a further 8,000 items.
- Museo di Mineralogia e Litologia (Via La Pira, 4) - About 50,000 specimens in a number of collections. Of particular interest are the earliest items from the Tribuna degli Uffizi (about 500 specimens), and the collection of Giovanni Targioni Tozzetti (about 5,000 items), cataloged in 12 manuscript volumes.
- Museo Nazionale di Antropologia ed Etnologia (Palazzo Nonfinito. Via del Proconsolo, 12) - About 15,000 ethnological items and 6,100 anthropological items, with a photographic collection containing a further 26,000 prints and 7,000 negatives. The original collection was a cabinet of curiosities containing items such as an ivory horn from the Kingdom of Kongo, Persian insignia of command, and bows and arrows from the upper Amazon. It was notably augmented by items from Captain James Cook's voyages in the Pacific.
- Zoologia "La Specola" (Via Romana, 17) - A major collection of some 3 million zoological specimens, of which about 5,000 are on public display, with a further 3,000 specimens in the hall of skeletons. The collection of wax anatomical models is of particular interest. It was begun in 1771 by Grand Duke Pietro Leopoldo and is said to be the largest such collection in the world; about 1,400 models are currently on public display.
