= Francesco Salviati (bishop) =

Archbishop of Pisa from 1474, participant in the Pazzi Conspiracy (1443–1478)

- Archbishop of Pisa
- In office: 1475–1478

Personal details
- Born: 1443 Italy
- Died: 1478 (aged 34/35) Florence, Republic of Florence

Francesco Salviati (1443 – 1478) was the archbishop of Pisa from 1474 to 1478. He was one of the organisers of the Pazzi conspiracy, a plot to displace the Medici family as rulers of the Florentine Republic; he was executed after the failure of the plot.

== Biography ==
A blood-member of the Salviati family (to whom Pope Sixtus IV had re-awarded the papal banking contract after taking it away from the Medici), he was also related by marriage to the Pazzi, Medici, Vettori, and other powerful families. Orphaned at a young age, Salviati was educated as a humanist but vied to succeed in the church, knowing he could not rise to power in the family after losing his father. Pro-Medici sources paint Salviati as a flatterer and gambler who lusted for the power that could be attained through church favour.

In 1464, Salviati moved to Rome to attach himself to Francesco della Rovere – who later became Pope Sixtus IV – and his nephews, Girolamo and Pietro Riario. This paid off in his appointment as archbishop.

The Medici family, who ruled the Republic of Florence at the time, opposed his appointment as archbishop, and so Salviati met with several other individuals dissatisfied with the Medici's rule to plan the assassination of Lorenzo and Giuliano de ' Medici, co-rulers of Florence, in what later became known as the Pazzi conspiracy. In spring 1478, Salviati sent his nephew Raffaele Riario to lure Lorenzo and Giuliano into a trap by inviting them to mass at the Santa Maria del Fiore cathedral, where the attack would take place. When the bell that was rung during the elevation rang, Salviati was to go to the Palazzo Vecchio, kill the Gonfaloniere Petrucci and take possession of the Palazzo della Signoria, whilst the main killing occurred in the cathedral. However, upon arriving at the Palazzo Vecchio, Salviati was arrested by Petrucci and within an hour had been hanged by a lynch mob from the window of the Sala dei Duecento. In the end, the Pazzi plot failed due to Lorenzo surviving the assassination attempt, and most of the conspirators were promptly hunted down and executed. Salviati's death at the hands of the Florentines was a key factor of the interdict placed upon Florence and the ensuing two years of war with the Papacy.

== In popular culture ==
Francesco Salviati appears as a minor antagonist in the video game Assassin's Creed II, in which he is depicted as a member of the Templar Order, who within the game's storyline are responsible for the Pazzi conspiracy. Salviati's role in the conspiracy is greatly reduced in the game, as he is merely ordered to lead Pazzi-allied troops into Florence after the attack on the Medici. Following the failure of the Pazzi plot, Salviati is able to flee to his villa in the Tuscan countryside (an unfortunate farmer having been hanged in Florence in his place), only to be hunted down and assassinated in 1479 by Ezio Auditore.

Jacob Fortune-Lloyd portrays Salviati in the second season of the drama series Medici: Masters of Florence.
