= Francesco de' Pazzi =

Italian banker and instigator in the Pazzi conspiracy (1444–1478)

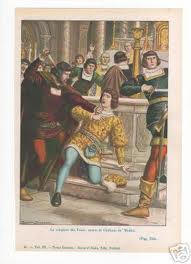
- Francesco de' Pazzi (left) stabbing Giuliano de' Medici to death during the Pazzi conspiracy

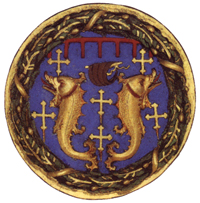
- Coat of arms
- Born: 28 January 1444; Florence, Republic of Florence
- Died: 26 April 1478 (aged 34); Florence, Republic of Florence
- Cause of death: Death by hanging
- Noble family: Pazzi
- Occupation: Banker

Francesco de' Pazzi (28 January 1444 – 26 April 1478) was a Florentine banker, a member of the Pazzi noble family, and one of the instigators of the Pazzi conspiracy, a plot to displace the Medici family as rulers of the Florentine Republic. His uncle, Jacopo de' Pazzi, was one of the main organizers of the conspiracy.

== Conspiracy ==
On 26 April 1478, Easter Sunday, there was an attempt to assassinate Lorenzo de' Medici and his brother and co-ruler Giuliano while both were attending High Mass at the Santa Maria del Fiore cathedral in Florence. Giuliano was murdered by Francesco and Bernardo Baroncelli, who inflicted a fatal sword wound to the head before stabbing him 19 times; however, Lorenzo survived the attack, having been merely wounded by the other conspirators. Francesco then returned to his uncle's villa, where the latter found him with a wound in one leg, reportedly self-inflicted during the attack.

Shortly after the failure of the Pazzi conspiracy, most of the people involved were hunted down and killed. Francesco was taken from his bed and dragged through the streets of Florence by an angry mob before ultimately being hanged from the Palazzo della Signoria, next to the decomposing body of fellow conspirator Francesco Salviati. His uncle Jacopo would soon meet the same fate.

== Media portrayals ==
Francesco de' Pazzi was sung by bass Ludovico Contini in the first performance of Leoncavallo's 1893 opera I Medici.

Francesco appears as an antagonist in the video game Assassin's Creed II, voiced by Andreas Apergis. In the game, he has a son named Vieri and is a member of the Templar Order, who are depicted as the orchestrators of the Pazzi conspiracy. Both characters are killed by the protagonist Ezio Auditore, who saved Lorenzo de' Medici during the assassination attempt.

Elliot Levey portrayed Francesco de' Pazzi in TV series Da Vinci's Demons.

Francesco is referenced in the film Hannibal, when Hannibal Lecter meets a modern-day descendant of the Pazzi family, Chief Inspector Rinaldo Pazzi. Rinaldo tries to capture Lecter to collect a large reward; however, he meets a similar fate to his ancestors when Lecter disembowels and hangs him from a balcony.

Francesco appears in the second season of Medici: Masters of Florence, played by Matteo Martari.

Francesco appears in the historical novel "Florenzer" by Phil Melanson, which features the Pazzi conspiracy as a central plot point.
