= Pazzi conspiracy =

1478 plot in the Republic of Florence

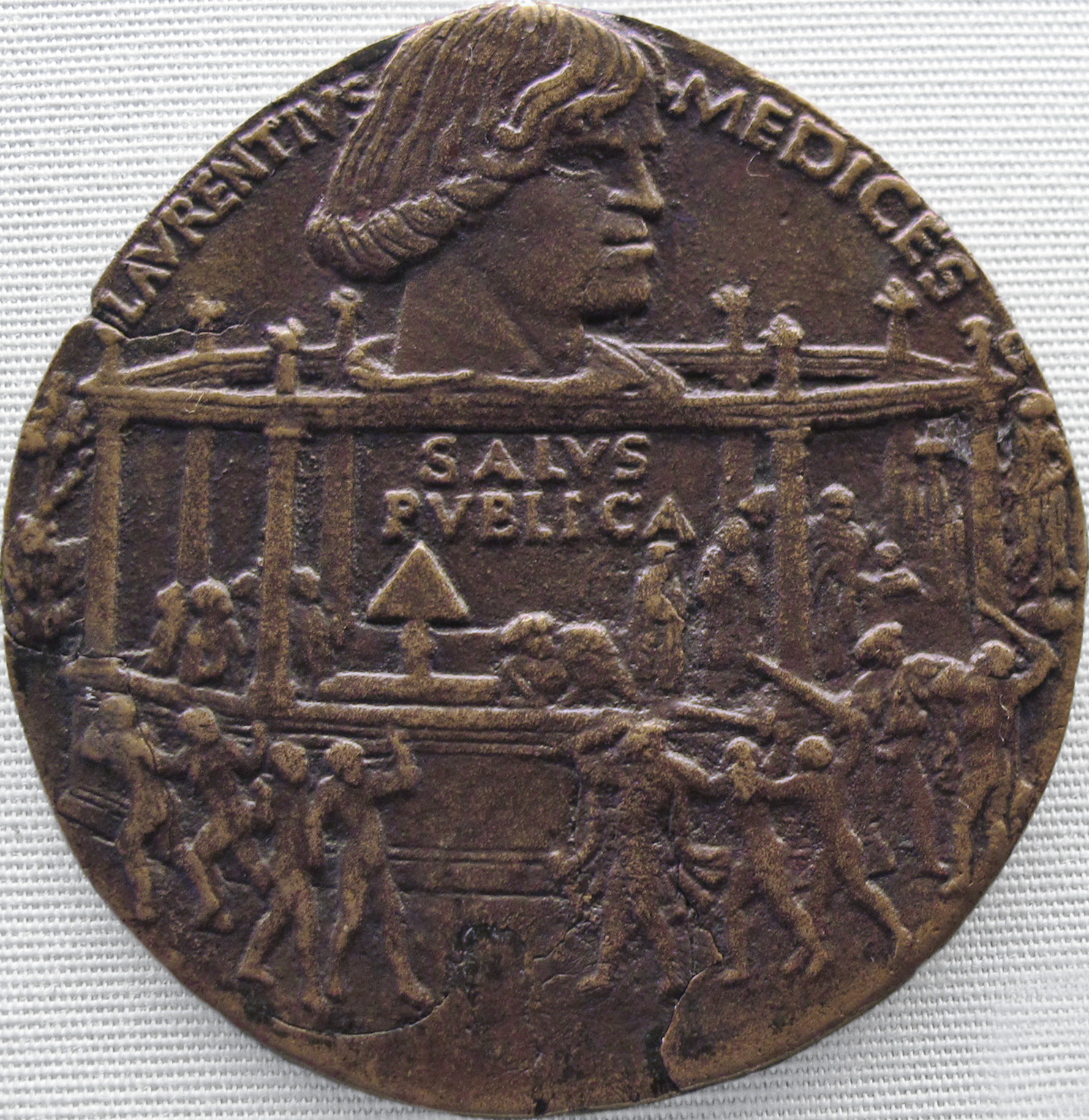
- Commemorative medal by Bertoldo di Giovanni, 1478, showing the assassination attempt (Staatliche Münzsammlung, Munich)
- Native name: Congiura dei Pazzi
- Date: 26 April 1478
- Location: Duomo of Florence
- Also known as: Pazzi plot
- Type: Assassination attempt
- Organised by: Pope Sixtus IV; Girolamo Riario; Francesco Salviati; Francesco de' Pazzi
- Participants: Bernardo Bandini dei Baroncelli; Jacopo de' Pazzi; Antonio Maffei da Volterra; Stefano da Bagnone
- Deaths: Giuliano de' Medici; Francesco Nori
- Injuries: Lorenzo de' Medici, wounded
- Convictions: about 80
- Sentence: execution

The Pazzi conspiracy (Italian: Congiura dei Pazzi) was a failed plot by members of the Pazzi family and others to displace the Medici family as rulers of Renaissance Florence.

On 26 April 1478 there was an attempt to assassinate Lorenzo de' Medici and his brother Giuliano. Lorenzo was wounded but survived; Giuliano was killed.

More than eighty people implicated in the plot were executed, some by hanging from the windows of the Palazzo della Signoria. The surviving Pazzi family members were banished from Florence.

== Background ==
Francesco della Rovere, who came from a poor family in Liguria, was elected pope in 1471. As Sixtus IV, he was both wealthy and powerful and at once set about giving power and wealth to his nephews of the della Rovere and Riario families. Within months of his election, he had made Giuliano della Rovere (the future pope Julius II) and Pietro Riario both bishops and cardinals (including the archbishopric of Florence for Riario); four other nephews were also made cardinals. He made Giovanni della Rovere, who was not a priest, prefect of Rome, and arranged for him to marry into the da Montefeltro family, dukes of Urbino.

For Girolamo Riario, also a layman – and who may in fact have been his son rather than his nephew – he arranged to buy Imola, a small town in Romagna, with the aim of establishing a new papal state in that area. Imola lay on the trade route between Florence and Venice. Lorenzo de' Medici had arranged in May 1473 to buy it from Galeazzo Maria Sforza, the duke of Milan, for 100,000 fiorini d'oro, but Sforza subsequently agreed to sell it instead to Sixtus for 40,000 ducats, provided that his illegitimate daughter Caterina Sforza was married to (Girolamo) Riario. This purchase was supposed to be financed by the Medici bank, but Lorenzo refused, causing a rift between Sixtus and the termination of the appointment of the Medici as bankers to the Camera Apostolica. The pope negotiated with other bankers, and a substantial part of the cost was obtained from the Pazzi bank.

A further source of friction between Lorenzo and Sixtus was the status of the archbishoprics of Florence, left vacant by the sudden death of Pietro Riario in January 1474; and of Pisa, left vacant by the death of Filippo de' Medici in October 1474. Lorenzo managed to obtain the archbishopric of Florence for his brother-in-law, Rinaldo Orsini [it]; but Sixtus appointed Francesco Salviati, a friend and relative of Francesco de' Pazzi, as archbishop of Pisa. This latter appointment was contested by the Florentines (the Medici) on the grounds that they had not given their assent.

== Conspiracy ==
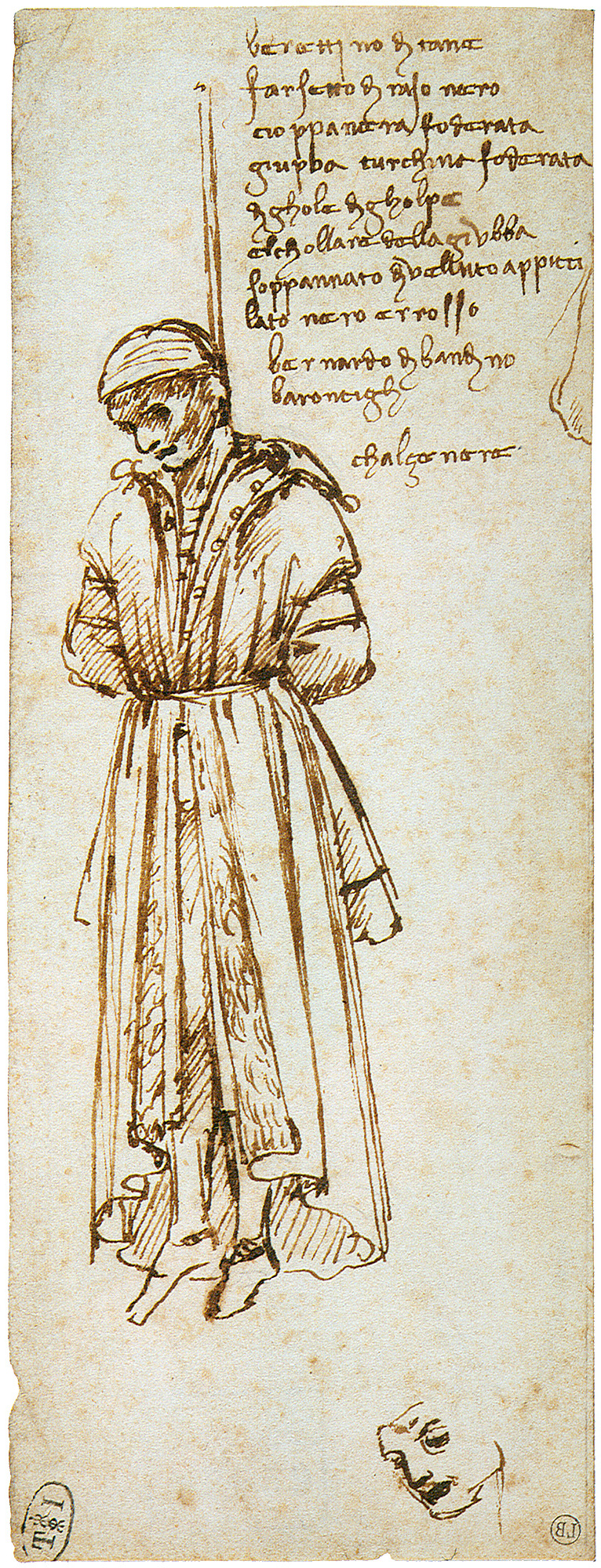
1479 drawing by Leonardo da Vinci of hanged Pazzi conspirator Bernardo Bandini dei Baroncelli

Girolamo Riario, Francesco Salviati and Francesco de' Pazzi planned to assassinate Lorenzo and Giuliano de' Medici, and approached Pope Sixtus for his support. Sixtus made it clear that it would benefit the papacy to have the Medici removed from their position of power in Florence, but refused to sanction killing. He instructed the men to do whatever they deemed necessary to achieve this aim – without bloodshed – and offered them any assistance they might need. An encrypted letter in the archives of the Ubaldini family, discovered and decoded in 2004, shows that Federico da Montefeltro, the father-in-law of Giovanni della Rovere, was deeply embroiled in the conspiracy and had committed to position 600 troops outside Florence, waiting for the right moment.

== Attack ==
The attack took place on the morning of Sunday, 26 April 1478, during High Mass at the Duomo of Florence. Unusually, Lorenzo and Giuliano were both present, and were attacked at the same time. Lorenzo was attacked by two of Jacopo Pazzi's men, but managed to escape to the sacristy, and thence to his home. Giuliano was killed by Bernardo Bandini dei Baroncelli and Francesco de' Pazzi. Archbishop Salviati, with a number of Jacopo Pazzi's men, went to the Palazzo della Signoria and attempted to take control of it, but was unsuccessful – the Florentines did not rise against the Medici as the Pazzi had hoped they would. Salviati was arrested and, with Francesco de' Pazzi and several others, was hanged from the windows of the Palazzo della Signoria.

Many of the conspirators, as well as many people accused of being conspirators, were killed; more than thirty died on the day of the attack. Most were soon caught and summarily executed. Renato de' Pazzi was lynched and hanged. Jacopo de' Pazzi, head of the family, escaped from Florence but was caught and brought back. He was tortured, then hanged from the Palazzo della Signoria next to the decomposing corpse of Salviati. He was buried at Santa Croce, but the body was dug up and thrown into a ditch. It was then dragged through the streets and propped up at the door of Palazzo Pazzi, where the rotting head was mockingly used as a door-knocker. From there it was thrown into the Arno; children fished it out and hung it from a willow tree, flogged it, and then threw it back into the river.

Lorenzo did manage to save the nephew of Sixtus IV, Cardinal Raffaele Riario, who was almost certainly an innocent pawn of the conspirators, as well as two relatives of the conspirators. The main conspirators were hunted down throughout Italy. Between 26 April, the day of the attack, and 20 October 1478, a total of eighty people were executed. Bandini dei Baroncelli, who had escaped to Constantinople, was arrested and returned in fetters by the Sultan Mehmed II, and – still in Turkish clothing – was hanged from a window of the Palazzo del Capitano del Popolo on 29 December 1479. There were three further executions on 6 June 1481.

The Pazzi were banished from Florence, and their lands and property confiscated. Their name and coat of arms were perpetually suppressed: the name was erased from public registers, and all buildings and streets bearing it were renamed; their shield with its dolphins was obliterated everywhere. Anyone named Pazzi had to take a new name; anyone married to a Pazzi was barred from public office. Guglielmo de' Pazzi, husband of Lorenzo's sister Bianca, was placed under house arrest, and later forbidden to enter the city; he went to live at Torre a Decima, near Pontassieve.

== Repercussions ==
Sixtus IV reacted strongly to the death of Salviati: with a bull of 1 June 1478 he excommunicated Lorenzo, his supporters and all members of the current and preceding administration of the city. On 20 June he placed Florence under interdict, forbidding Mass and communion. By July troops of the Kingdom of Naples under the command of Alfonso of Aragon, and others from Urbino under Federico da Montefeltro, had begun to make attacks on Florentine territory. Lorenzo took an unorthodox course of action: he sailed to Naples and put himself in the hands of the king, Ferdinand I, who interceded on his behalf with the pope, though without success.

The events of the Pazzi conspiracy affected the developments of the Medici regime in two ways: they convinced the supporters of the Medici that a greater concentration of political power was desirable and they strengthened the hand of Lorenzo de' Medici, who had demonstrated his ability in conducting the foreign affairs of the city. Emboldened, the Medicean party carried out new reforms.

Shortly after the attack, Poliziano – who was in the Duomo when it took place – wrote his Pactianae coniurationis commentarium, a dramatic account of the conspiracy. It was published by Niccolò di Lorenzo della Magna; a revised edition appeared in 1480.
