= Giuliano de' Medici =

Lord of Florence from 1469 to 1478

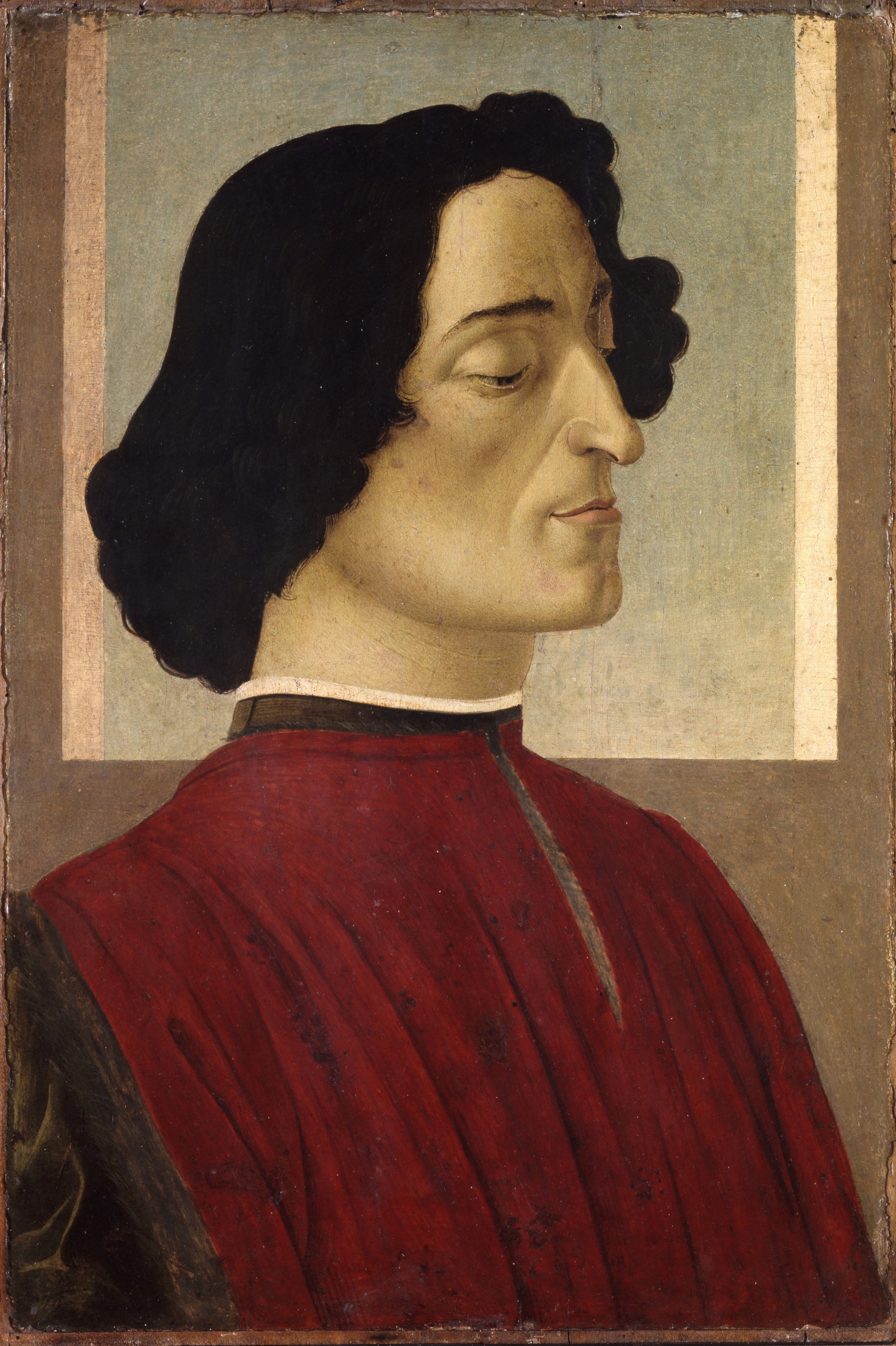
- Portrait by Sandro Botticelli
- Full name: Giuliano di Piero de Medici
- Born: 28 October 1453; Florence, Republic of Florence
- Died: 26 April 1478 (aged 24); Florence Cathedral, Republic of Florence
- Noble family: Medici
- Issue: Pope Clement VII (ill. by Fioretta Gorini)
- Father: Piero the Gouty
- Mother: Lucrezia Tornabuoni

Giuliano de' Medici (28 October 1453 – 26 April 1478) was the second son of Piero de' Medici (the Gouty) and Lucrezia Tornabuoni. As co-ruler of the Florentine Republic, with his brother Lorenzo the Magnificent, he complemented his brother's image as the "patron of the arts" with his own image as the handsome, sporting "golden boy". He was killed in a plot known as the Pazzi conspiracy in 1478.

== Personal life ==
In 1478, Giuliano was promised in marriage to Semiramide Appiani Aragona, daughter of Iacopo III Appiani, Prince of Piombino and niece of Simonetta Vespucci, though he died before the wedding could take place. After Giuliano's death, Semiramide married his cousin, Lorenzo di Pierfrancesco de' Medici, in 1482.

At fifteen years of age, he found himself at the head of the Florentine Signoria alongside his brother Lorenzo. Despite his passion for art and culture, and some occasional frictions between the two due to their differing characters, Lorenzo nonetheless wanted Giuliano at his side in the administration of Florence, placing trust in him.

On January 29, 1475, Giuliano took part in the tournament in Piazza Santa Croce. This was celebrated by Angelo Poliziano, who wrote two works which include Giuliano de' Medici as a major character. Stanze cominciate per la giostra del Magnifico Giuliano de’ Medici was written to commemorate a joust that Giuliano won in 1475.

The occasion of the joust in Piazza Santa Croce was one of the most important events for Giuliano's public visibility, definitively consecrating him alongside his brother as one of the most influential personalities in Florence. For the occasion, he rode a steed that had been specially brought from the court of Naples; horse and rider were decked out "in adornments and jewels worth more than 60,000 florins."

A marriage was considered for Giuliano in 1474 and again in 1477 (after the conclusion of the alliance with Venice) with a young woman from the dogal family of the Correr, but nothing came of it. In 1475, his brother Lorenzo would have wanted him to marry a daughter of the Borromeo family, but he opposed it, deeming it inappropriate for him to marry the daughter of a merchant, however wealthy and of distant Florentine origins. In 1476, the hand of a niece of Girolamo Riario, the powerful nephew of Pope Sixtus IV, was proposed to him, but this proposal also fell through. The marriage agreement was finally reached in 1477, when Giuliano decided to marry Semiramide, sister of Jacopo IV Appiano, lord of Piombino, on the condition that the marriage settlement include a regular lease contract for the iron mines of the Isle of Elba to the benefit of the two Medici brothers. This marriage, however, likewise failed to materialise, as Giuliano died the following year while preparations for the wedding were still underway.

Giuliano had an illegitimate son by his mistress Fioretta Gorini, Giulio di Giuliano de' Medici, who would later become Pope Clement VII.

== Death ==
The Pazzi conspirators attempted to lure Giuliano and Lorenzo away from Florence to kill them outside the boundaries of the city, first on the road to Piombino, then in Rome, and finally at a banquet hosted by the Medici at their villa in Fiesole. Giuliano did not come, claiming to be ill. The choice to commit the murder at high mass was a last minute choice, as the soldier that was assigned the task of killing the brothers did not want to commit murder in a church.

As the opening stroke of the Pazzi conspiracy, Giuliano was assassinated on 26 April 1478 – in the Duomo of Florence, Santa Maria del Fiore, by Francesco de' Pazzi and Bernardo Baroncelli. During Mass, at the sounding of the Elevation, he received a fatal sword wound to the head and was stabbed 19 times. He died lying on the cathedral floor. Lorenzo, who had escaped to the Medici palace, did not learn of his brother's death for several hours.

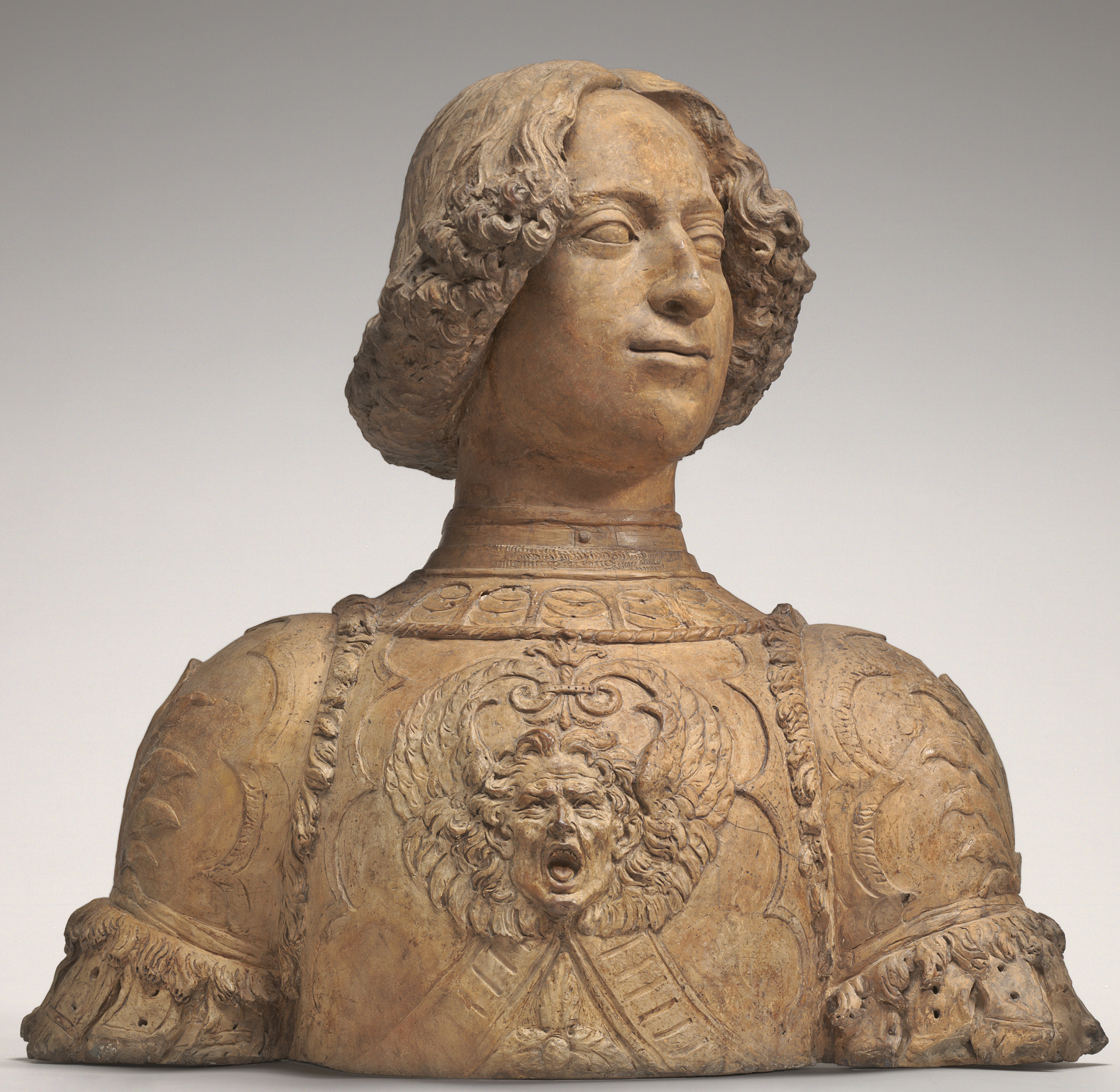
Giuliano de' Medici, terracotta bust by Andrea del Verrocchio, c. 1475/1478, in the National Gallery of Art.

After a modest funeral on 30 April 1478, Giuliano was buried in his father's tomb in the Church of San Lorenzo, but later, with his brother Lorenzo, was reinterred in the Medici Chapel of the same church, in a tomb surmounted by a statue of the Madonna and Child of Michelangelo. After his death, at least two sonnets about Giuliano circulated in Florence, one of them written by Luigi Pulci for Lucrezia Tornabuoni the mother of Giuliano.

== Portrayals in media ==
Giuliano's portrait by Sandro Botticelli is thought to have been painted shortly after his death. The open window and dove were known symbols of death, and some have suggested that the lowered eyelids suggest that a death mask may have been used as reference.

Giuliano makes a brief appearance in the video game Assassin's Creed II (2009) where he is murdered by Francesco de' Pazzi and other conspirators of the Pazzi conspiracy.

Giuliano is portrayed by Tom Bateman in Starz's original series Da Vinci's Demons (2013–2015). Giuliano de' Medici was portrayed by Bradley James in the second and third seasons of the TV series Medici: Masters of Florence (2016–2019).
