= Slant-top desk =

Chest of drawers topped by a hinged desktop

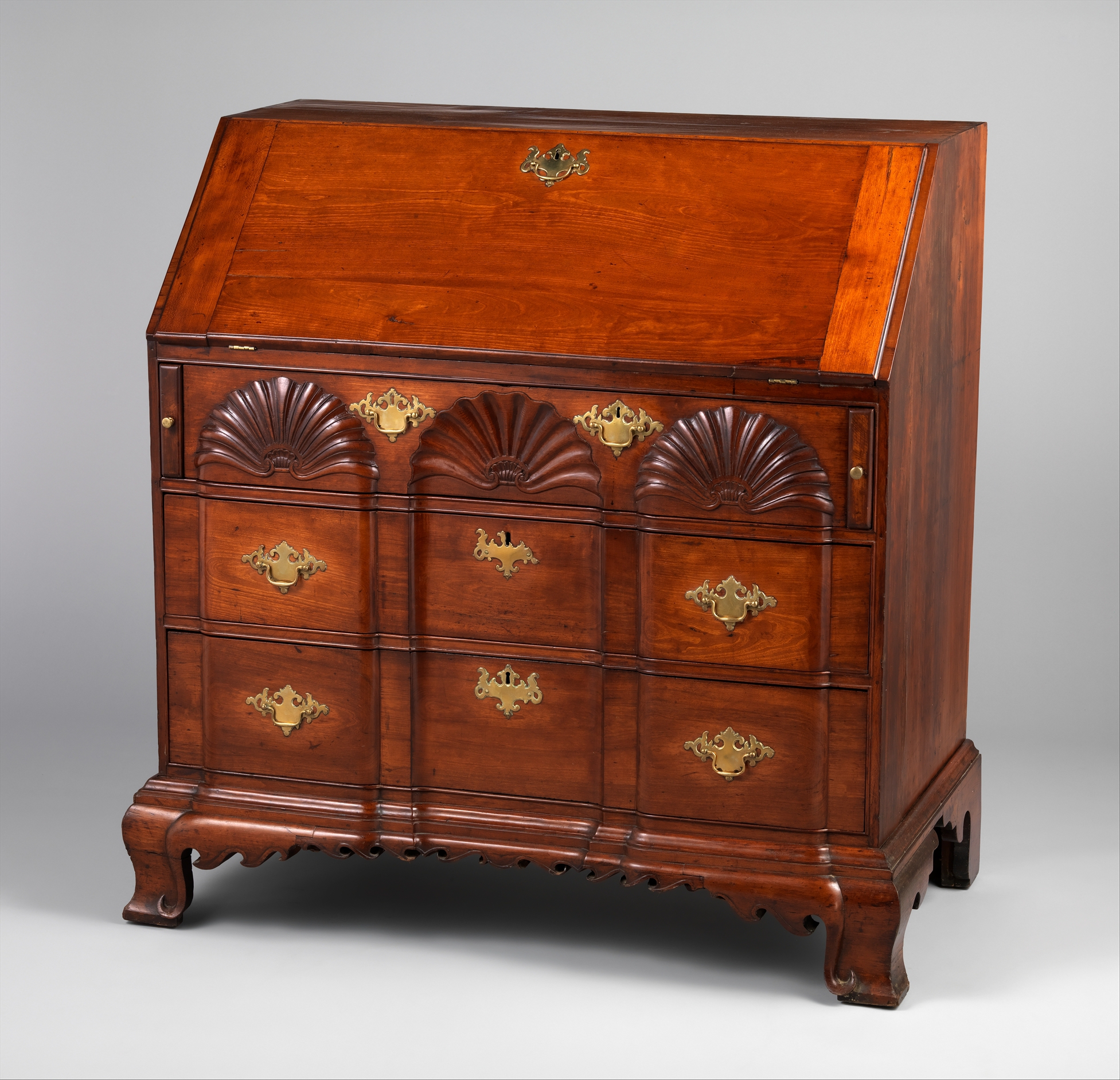
Slant-top desk in the block front seashell style, 18th century.

The slant-top desk, also called secretary desk, or more properly, a bureau, is a piece of writing furniture with a lid that closes at an angle and opens up as a writing surface. It can be considered related, in form, to the desk on a frame, which was a form of portable desk in earlier eras.

== History ==
The first pieces that not only resembled the bureau, but also carried the bureau name, were manufactured in France in the middle of the 17th century. Both the name (that comes from the Medieval French and hints at the type of the linen used as a pad for writing) and antecedents are much older. A medieval example is provided by a Swedish desk with a sloped surface made at the turn of the 13th century, although writing boxes, and not freestanding furniture, were typical prior to Renaissance, when cabinets with a drop-leaf board for writing started to appear in Italy and Spain (cf. Bargueño desk).

The 17-th century France bureau Mazarin had inspired a bureau brisé, where the hinged decorative top can be lifted to reveal a space for writing. While French went on to creating a regular four-legged writing desk under a name "bureau plat", in England designs acquired the sloping flap that covered the interior and doubled as a writing surface when opened. By 1700 the English bureaus switched from supporting legs to set drawers all the way to the floor; one of the most popular versions was the bureau-cabinet with a tall cabinet above the desk. The designs from England quickly spread throughout the Northern Europe and Italy, in the process getting elaborate outlines.

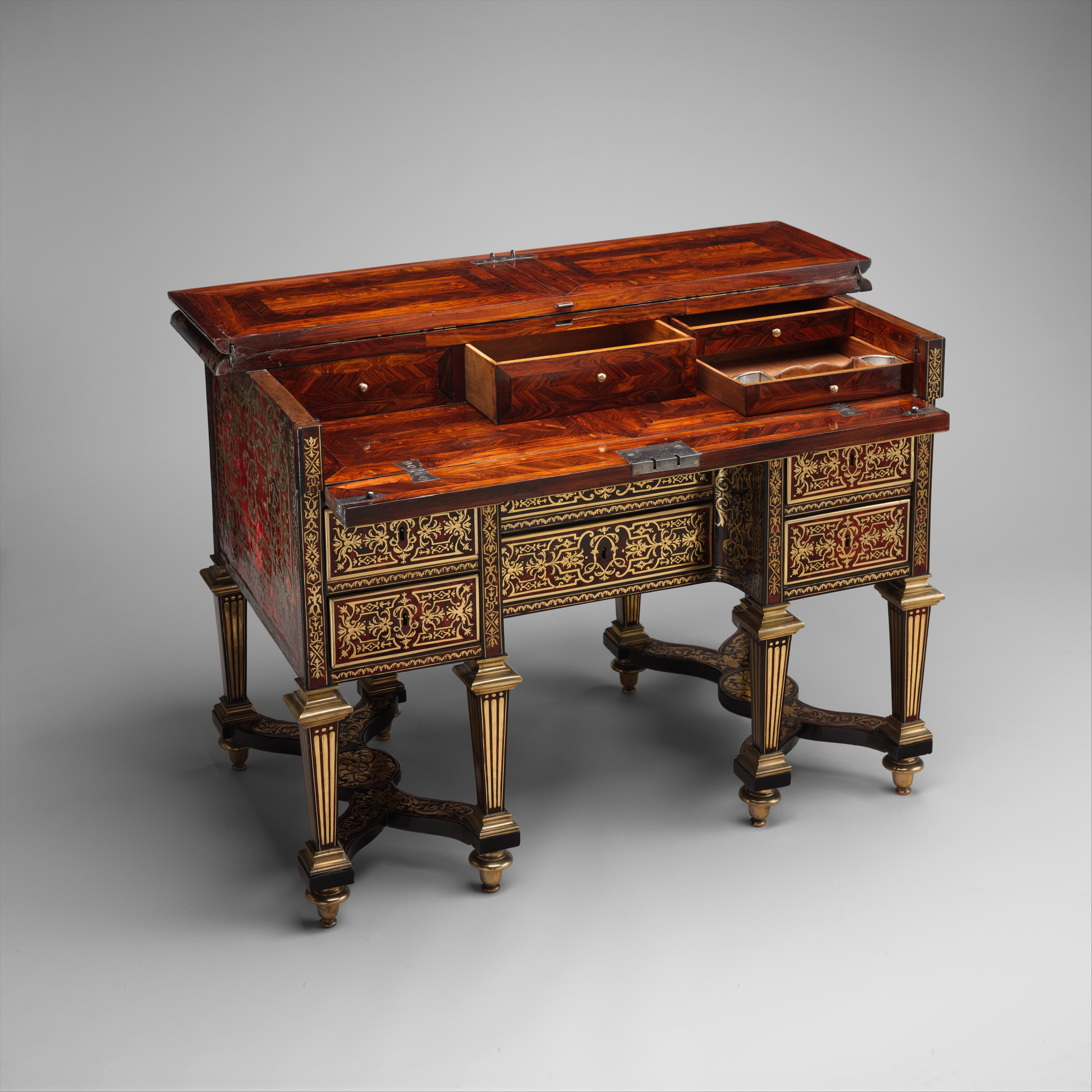
Bureau brisé with the top opened (Jean Bérain the Elder, ca. 1685)

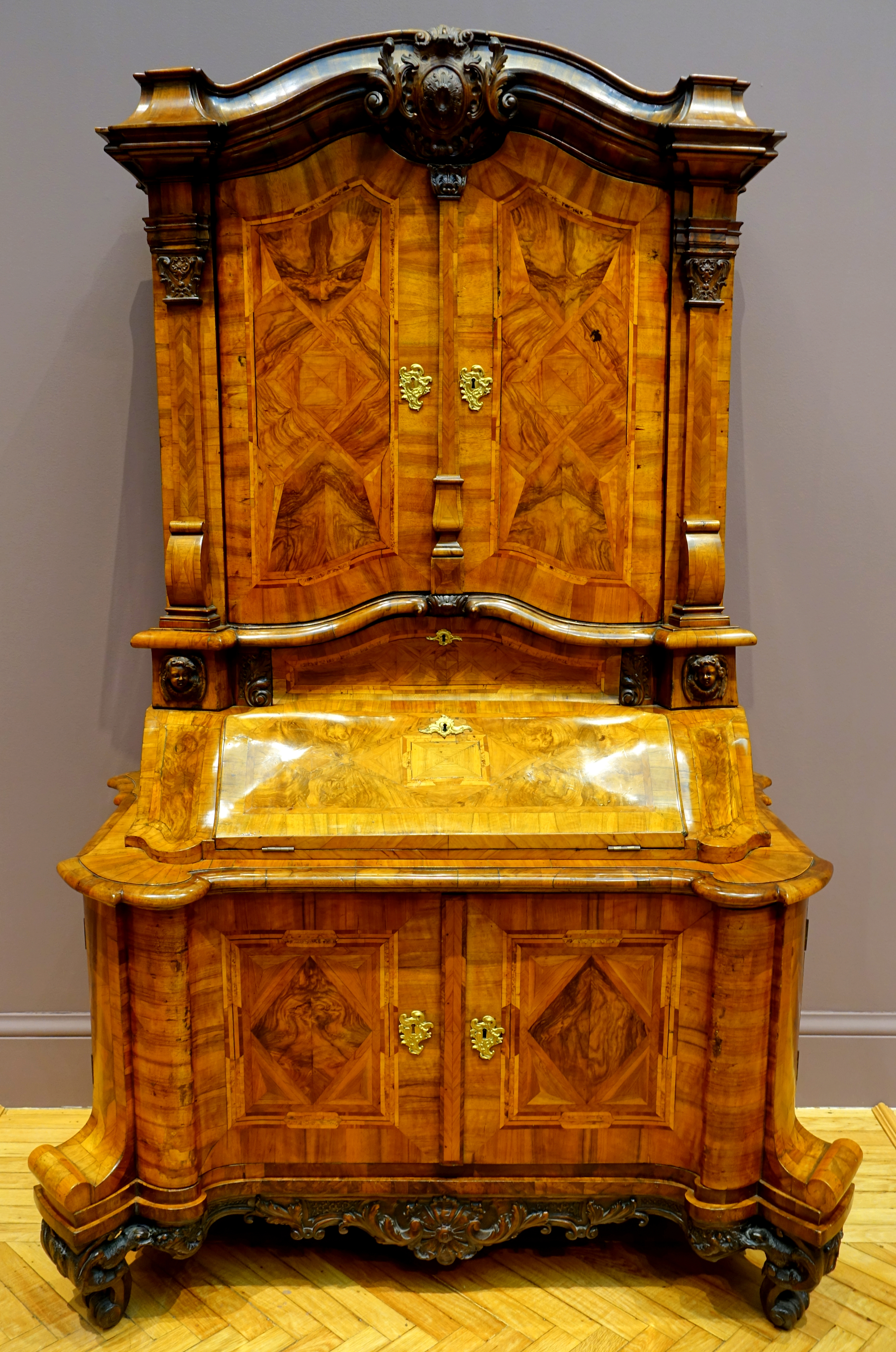
Bureau-cabinet (Germany, ca. 1760)

== In the USA ==
In the United States, the slant-top desk is sometimes called a Governor Winthrop desk, in memory of John Winthrop, a 17th century governor of the Massachusetts Bay Colony. As Winthrop died in 1647, he had no actual connection to this style of desk, which originated in the 18th century and is especially associated with Chippendale. The name "Winthrop" was attached to this kind of desk by the Winthrop Furniture Co. of Boston, Massachusetts, who offered their "Gov. Winthrop" desk in 1924, during the colonial revival period.

Like the Wooton desk, the fall-front desk and others with a hinged desktop (and unlike closable desks with an unmovable desktop like the rolltop desk or the cylinder desk), all documents and various items must be removed from the work surface of the slant-top desk before closing up.

The slant-top desk has been handcrafted in a variety of styles, one of them being the block front seashell desk of the 18th century which was popular among the well-to-do of Colonial America.

== Modern ==
Side view of a slant-top desk.

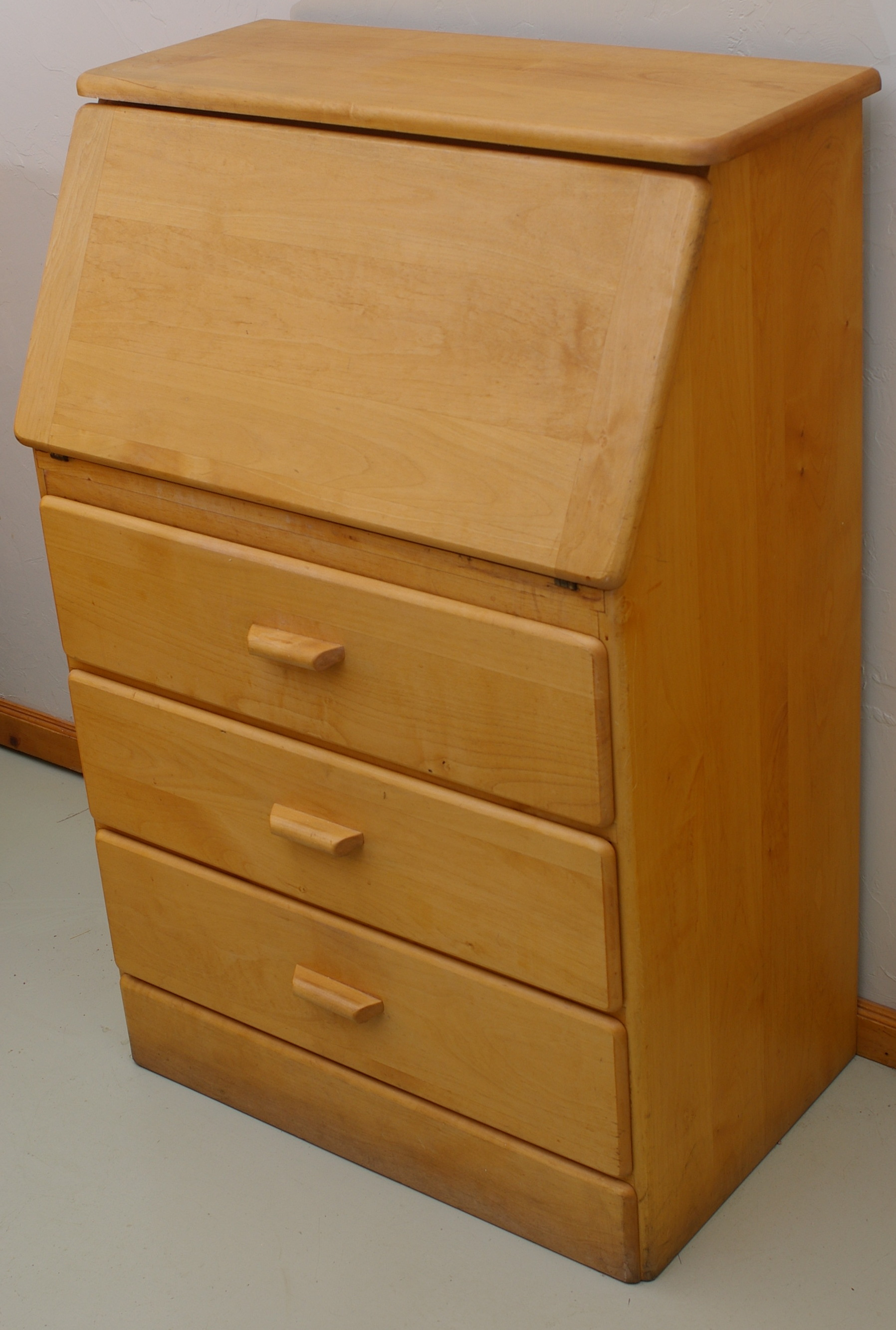
Modern slant-top desk

The slant-top desk has also been mass-produced in a great quantity of sub-forms and materials. For instance, some slant-top desks have very crude chains or levers to hold the desktop in an open working position, while others have elegant sliders ("lopers") which are manually or automatically extended to give support.

== See also ==
- List of desk forms and types

== Sources ==
- Aronson, Joseph. The Encyclopedia of Furniture. 3rd ed. New York: Crown Publishers, 1966.
- Boyce, Charles. Dictionary of Furniture. 2nd ed. New York: Roundtable Press Book, 2001.
- Gloag, John. A Complete Dictionary of Furniture. Woodstock, N.Y. : Overlook Press, 1991.
- Moser, Thomas. Measured Shop Drawings for American Furniture. New York: Sterling Publishing Inc., 1985.
- Romand, Didier. L'argus des meubles. Paris: Balland, 1976.
- Campbell, Gordon, ed. (9 November 2006). "Bureau". The Grove Encyclopedia of Decorative Arts: Two-volume Set. Oxford University Press, USA. pp. 160–162. ISBN 978-0-19-518948-3. OCLC 1000708379.
- Gloag, John (1952). A Short Dictionary Of Furniture. Read Books Ltd. pp. 154–158. ISBN 978-1-4474-9772-1. OCLC 1099027952.
