= Spinet desk =

A spinet desk is an antique desk with an exterior shape similar to a writing table, but slightly higher and is fitted with a single drawer under the whole length of the flat top surface. The spinet desk is so named because when closed it resembles a spinet, a musical instrument of the harpsichord family.

This single drawer, however, is a dummy. It is a hinged panel that is meant to be folded in, at the same time as half of the hinged top surface is folded back onto the top of the other half, revealing an inner desktop surface of normal height, with small drawers and pigeonholes in the back. In certain spinet desks, the inner desktop surface can be drawn out a few inches, adding working space.

Front of spinet desk, closed

Side of spinet desk, partly open

The image of the front of the spinet desk shows it in a closed position while the image of the side shows it in a partly open position, just before the hinged mobile part of the top is placed on the fixed part of the top.

By this capacity of hiding or revealing the main working area the spinet desk could be said to be a smaller, less obtrusive cousin of the rolltop desk and the cylinder desk. Like them, and unlike the secretary desk or the fall front desk, it can be closed up without disturbing too much the paperwork and various documents and implements left on the main desktop surface.

== See also ==
- List of desk forms and types
