= Secretaire en portefeuille =

Type of desk

The secretaire en portefeuille is an antique desk form which is usually mounted on rollers at the end of four jutting legs. The legs in turn support what looks like an oversize vertically mounted wooden pizza box. This is a cabinet a few inches thick, with barely enough space in it for the raised desktop surface and a few pens and sheets of paper disposed vertically. It is also called a "Billet doux".

The secretaire en portefeuille is much like a fall front desk which has been reduced in depth to a bare minimum. Like the fall front desk and the secretary desk the secretaire en portefeuille's desktop lifts up to cover internal areas and must thus be cleared of all work before closing up. By its mobile nature and its relatively light weight it was sometimes used as a fire screen desk. It was also sometimes known by that name.

Its name comes from the French word for wallet: portefeuille. This is probably because it has the same proportions as many kinds of wallets and it opens up a bit like some of them.

Modern day cabinet makers and furniture designers have sometimes created contemporary versions of the secretaire en portefeuille, eschewing the florid designs of the antique ones.

== See also ==
- List of desk forms and types

== Bibliography ==
- De Reyniès, Nicole. Le Mobilier Domestique: Vocabulaire Typologique. Paris: Ministère de la Culture et de La Communication, 1987.
- Gloag, John. A Complete Dictionary of Furniture. Woodstock, N.Y. : Overlook Press, 1991.
- Bogomolets O. Radomysl Castle-Museum on the Royal Road Via Regia. — Kyiv, 2013 ISBN 978-617-7031-15-3
