= Metamorphic library steps =

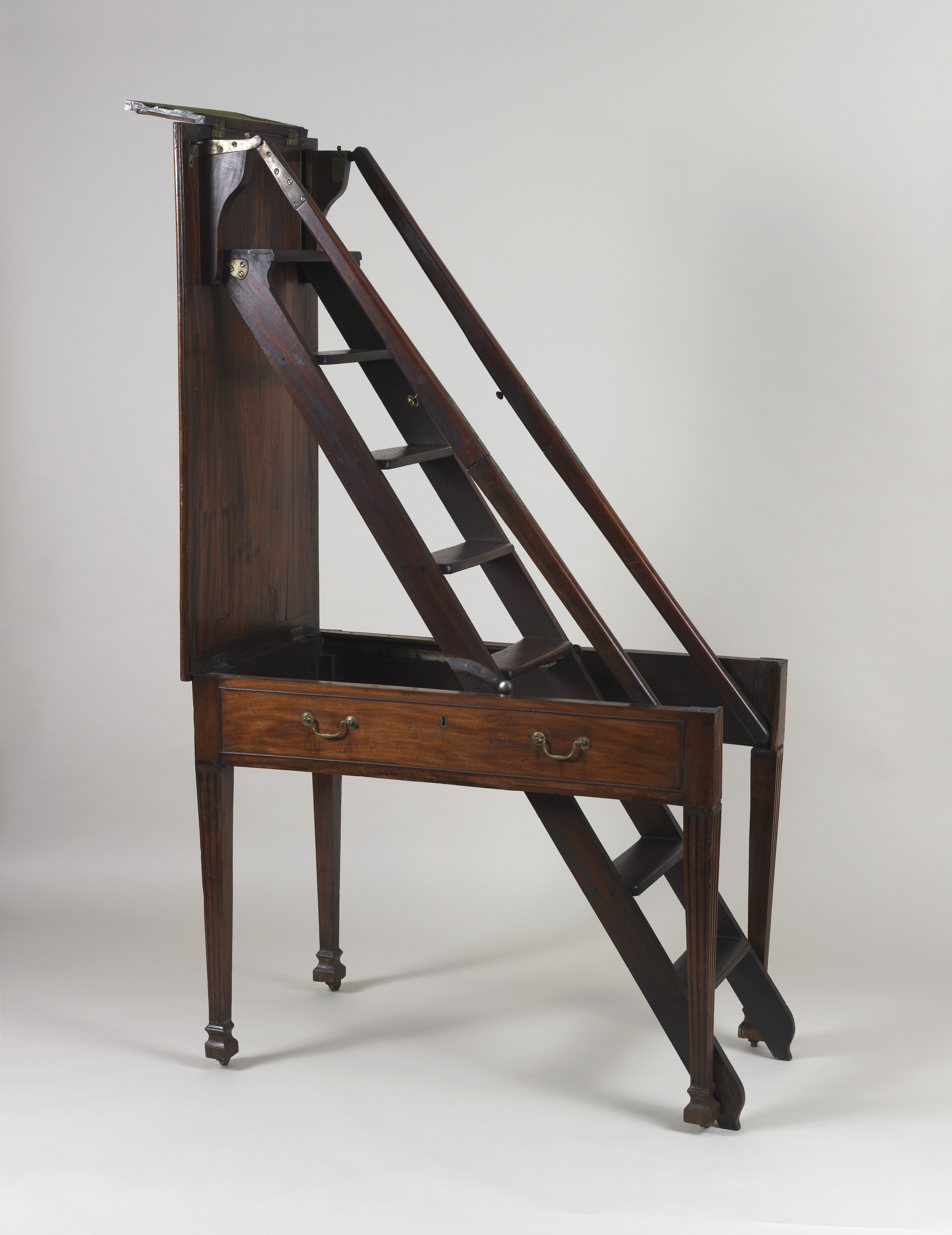
Table-steps

Metamorphic library steps are a type of archaic dual-use furniture, consisting of a small folding staircase that can be transformed into chair or desk form (such as a small writing table or library table). In desk form, it can also be considered a mechanical desk.

Metamorphic library steps were first built in the mid-18th century for the private libraries and offices of the European nobility or the Bourgeoisie. The number of specialised rooms in the typical manor was increasing, so existing ones, like the library, had to use space more efficiently. Consequently, these rooms often had high ceilings and floor-to-ceiling bookshelves. The topmost shelves were difficult to reach, so movable library steps or library stairs were created as a form of domestic furniture.

== Design history ==
During the second half of the 18th century a succession of talented German-born cabinet-makers passed through the French courts. Jean-François Oeben, Jean-Henri Riesener and David Roentgen had successively introduced the courts of Louis XV and Louis XVI to a wide range of finely made and exquisitely finished mechanical furniture. The ingenuity of these cabinet-makers, especially David Roentgen who became master cabinet-maker to Marie Antoinette, led to a fascination for meubles à surprises ('surprise furniture').

Cabinet-makers working in London based their designs on those of their French counterparts and a number of interesting mechanical furniture devices started to emerge. During the same period the portability of furniture became important. British officers keen to maintain their ‘home comforts’ transported chairs, sofas, dining tables and even four-poster beds into battle. By necessity, these items were designed to be portable and, while they reflected the style of the period, they could also be ‘flat-packed’ for ease of transportation. This ‘flat-pack’ or ‘knock-down furniture’, as it was then known, was also popular for anyone travelling by sea and some items were designed to be multi-purpose to save cabin space. The quality of this ‘campaign furniture’ was so high that the furniture designer and respected protagonist of the emerging English Empire Style, Thomas Sheraton, even recommended certain pieces for the home.

Tables, chairs and stools containing Library Steps were patented in Great Britain by Robert Campbell in 1774 but the chair-based design did not become popular until the second decade of the 19th century. Despite the appeal of the Regency period Metamorphic Library Chair, there is limited information available on the development of the design or the firms that made them. Most design references are based on two outline sketches. The first, by Rudolph Ackermann in 1811, illustrates a Morgan & Sanders chair and the second shows a chair made by Gillows in 1834. The lack of detail in these sketches and the scarcity of research relating to mechanical furniture design of this period, have led to many inaccurate claims.

== See also ==
- List of desk forms and types
- Step chair
