= Fire screen desk =

The fire screen desk (also known as a screen writing table) is a very small antique desk form meant to be placed in front of a fireplace to keep a user's feet warm while he or she is stationary while writing. This kind of desk was very popular in prosperous homes in Europe during the 18th century and slowly disappeared during the 19th, with the gradual introduction of stoves and central heating.

In order to keep the feet and the calves exposed to the heat from the fire, the fire screen desk usually had the form of a miniature writing table or a tiny bureau à gradin, with just a few drawers beneath the desktop. As its name indicates, it had a retractable fire screen in the back to protect the user's relatively exposed face from too much heat from the fireplace. The screen was usually made of a pleated or straight piece of heavy fabric, supported by crossed and sliding metallic supports. Many fire screen desks still exist, but the original screens have rarely survived. The metal supports or rods which extended the screens generally have been maintained with the desk. When the bare rods are in their extended position, they form an 'X shape' above the back of the desk.

A few fire screen desks had no screen per se but were simply lighter, narrower, and extremely thinner versions of the high secretary desk put on some form of permanent trestle mount. Their high form shielded the user's face from the heat of the flames while the open trestle mount at the bottom exposed the feet. They were basically a smaller version of a French form called secretaire en portefeuille.

The fire screen desk was often designed for use by a person of a specific gender: those designed for use by a female frequently had complex ornamentation and were generally smaller (light enough to be transported easily by a lady's maid) than those designed for use by a male. Because of these differences, individual desks were frequently called a gentleman's screen writing table or a lady's screen writing table.

== See also ==
- List of desk forms and types
