= Plantation desk =

A plantation desk is an antique desk form. It is thought to have been originally used as a mail desk by postmen. The form is known to have been used on Southern plantations in the United States, but it is not limited to them. For some time communities of Shakers in New England built a large version of this form of desk. It was quite popular in the 19th century.

The plantation desk is a fall front desk with a deeper stand or bottom part. The extra space or ledge of the bottom part of the desk serves as a support for the fall front, eliminating the need for retractable supports. Like a normal fall front desk the work surface must be cleared of all materials in order to raise it in a vertical position and close off the small drawers and pigeonholes set in front of the user. While the fall front desk was developed by placing a chest on its side on a stand made for it to its exact dimensions (as is the case with the bargueño desk), the plantation desk form was made by placing such a chest on its side on a table a bit too deep for it. The fall front usually settles at a slight angle once it is open, in order to give a slanted work surface to the user.

Some plantation desks have two panel doors instead of a fall front and the ledge is much deeper since it serves as the main desktop surface.

== See also ==
- List of desk forms and types
