= Drawing board =

Desk used for drawings and architecture

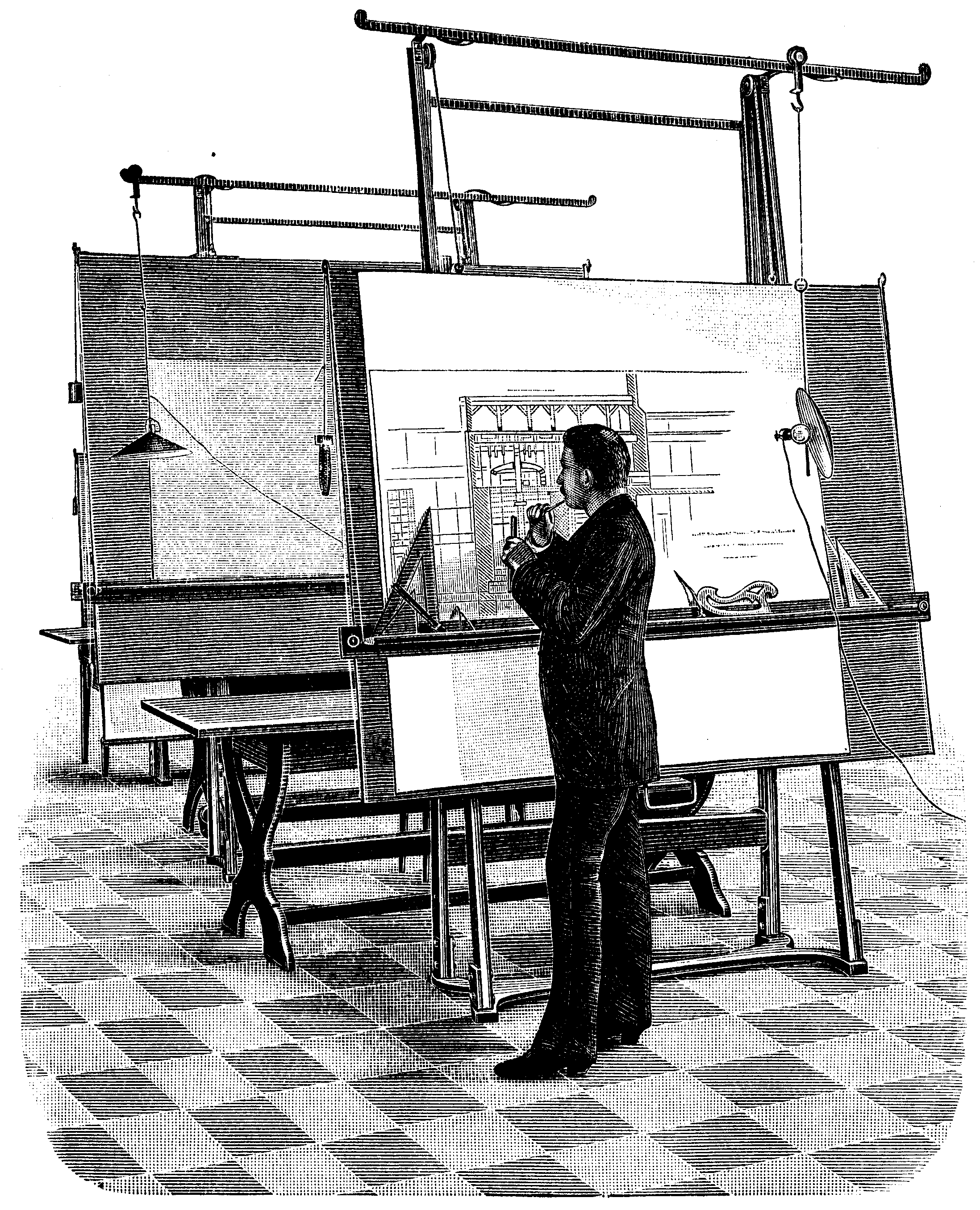
A 19th century architect at the drawing board

A drawing board (also drawing table, drafting table or architect's table) is, in its antique form, a kind of multipurpose desk which can be used for any kind of drawing, writing or impromptu sketching on a large sheet of paper or for reading a large format book or other oversized document or for drafting precise technical illustrations (such as engineering drawings or architectural drawings). The drawing table used to be a frequent companion to a pedestal desk in a study or private library, during the pre-industrial and early industrial era.

During the Industrial Revolution, draftsmanship gradually became a specialized trade and drawing tables slowly moved out of the libraries and offices of most gentlemen. They became more utilitarian and were built of steel and plastic instead of fine woods and brass.

More recently, engineers and draftsmen use the drawing board for making and modifying drawings on paper with ink or pencil. Different drawing instruments (set square, protractor, etc.) are used on it to draw parallel, perpendicular or oblique lines. There are instruments for drawing circles, arcs, other curves and symbols too (compass, French curve, stencil, etc.). However, with the gradual introduction of computer aided drafting and design (CADD or CAD) in the last decades of the 20th century and the first of the 21st century, the drawing board is becoming less common.

A drawing table is also sometimes called a mechanical desk because, for several centuries, most mechanical desks were drawing tables. Unlike the gadgety mechanical desks of the second part of the 18th century, however, the mechanical parts of drawing tables were usually limited to notches, ratchets, and perhaps a few simple gears, or levers or cogs to elevate and incline the working surface.

Very often a drawing table could look like a writing table or even a pedestal desk when the working surface was set at the horizontal and the height adjusted to 29 inches, in order to use it as a "normal" desk. The only giveaway was usually a lip on one of the sides of the desktop. This lip or edge stopped paper or books from sliding when the surface was given an angle. It was also sometimes used to hold writing implements. When the working surface was extended at its full height, a drawing table could be used as a standing desk.

Many reproductions have been made and are still being produced of drawing tables, copying the period styles they were originally made in during the 18th and 19th centuries.

== History ==
In the 18th and 19th centuries, drawing paper was dampened and then its edges glued to the drawing board. After drying the paper would be flat and smooth. The completed drawing was then cut free. Paper could also be secured to the drawing board with drawing pins or even C-clamps. More recent practice is to use self-adhesive drafting tape to secure paper to the board, including the sophisticated use of individualized adhesive dots from a dispensing roll. Some drawing boards are magnetized, allowing paper to be held down by long steel strips. Boards used for overlay drafting or animation may include registration pins or peg bars to ensure alignment of multiple layers of drawing media.

== Contemporary drafting tables ==
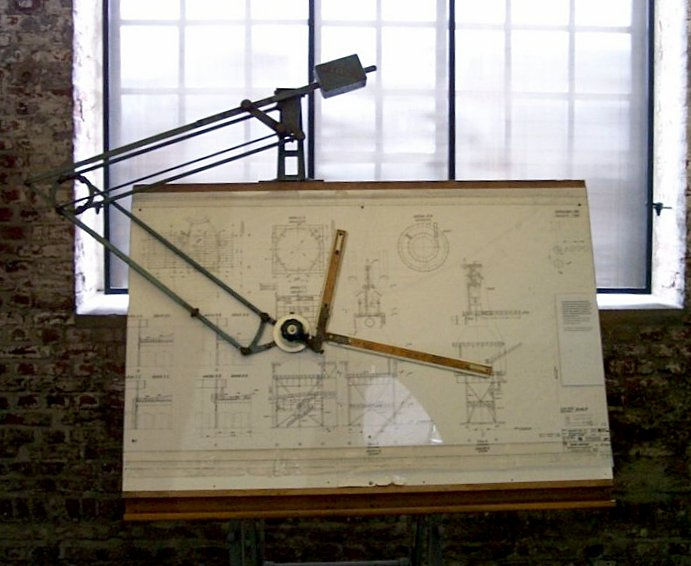
A drawing board with drafting machine, eliminating the need for a T-square

Despite the prevalence of computer-aided drafting, many older architects and even some structural designers still rely on paper-and-pencil graphics produced on a drafting table.

Modern drafting tables typically rely on a steel frame. Steel provides as much strength as the old oak drafting-table frames and much easier portability. Typically the drafting-board surface is a thick sheet of compressed fibreboard with sheets of Formica laminated to all its surfaces. The drafting-board surface is usually secured to the frame by screws, which can easily be removed for transportation.

The steel frame allows mechanical linkages to be installed that control both the height and angle of the drafting-board surface. Typically, a single foot pedal is used to control a clutch that clamps the board in the desired position. A heavy counterweight full of lead shot is installed in the steel linkage so that if the pedal is accidentally released, the drafting board will not spring into the upright position and injure the user. Drafting-table linkages and clutches have to be maintained to ensure that this safety mechanism counterbalances the weight of the table surface.

The drafting-table surface is usually covered with a thin vinyl sheet called a board cover. This provides an optimal surface for pen and pencil drafting. It allows compasses and dividers to be used without damaging the wooden surface of the board. A board cover must be frequently cleaned to prevent graphite buildup from making new drawings dirty. At the bottom edge of the table, a single strip of aluminum or steel may serve as a place to rest drafting pencils. More purpose-built trays are also used to hold pencils even while the board is being adjusted.

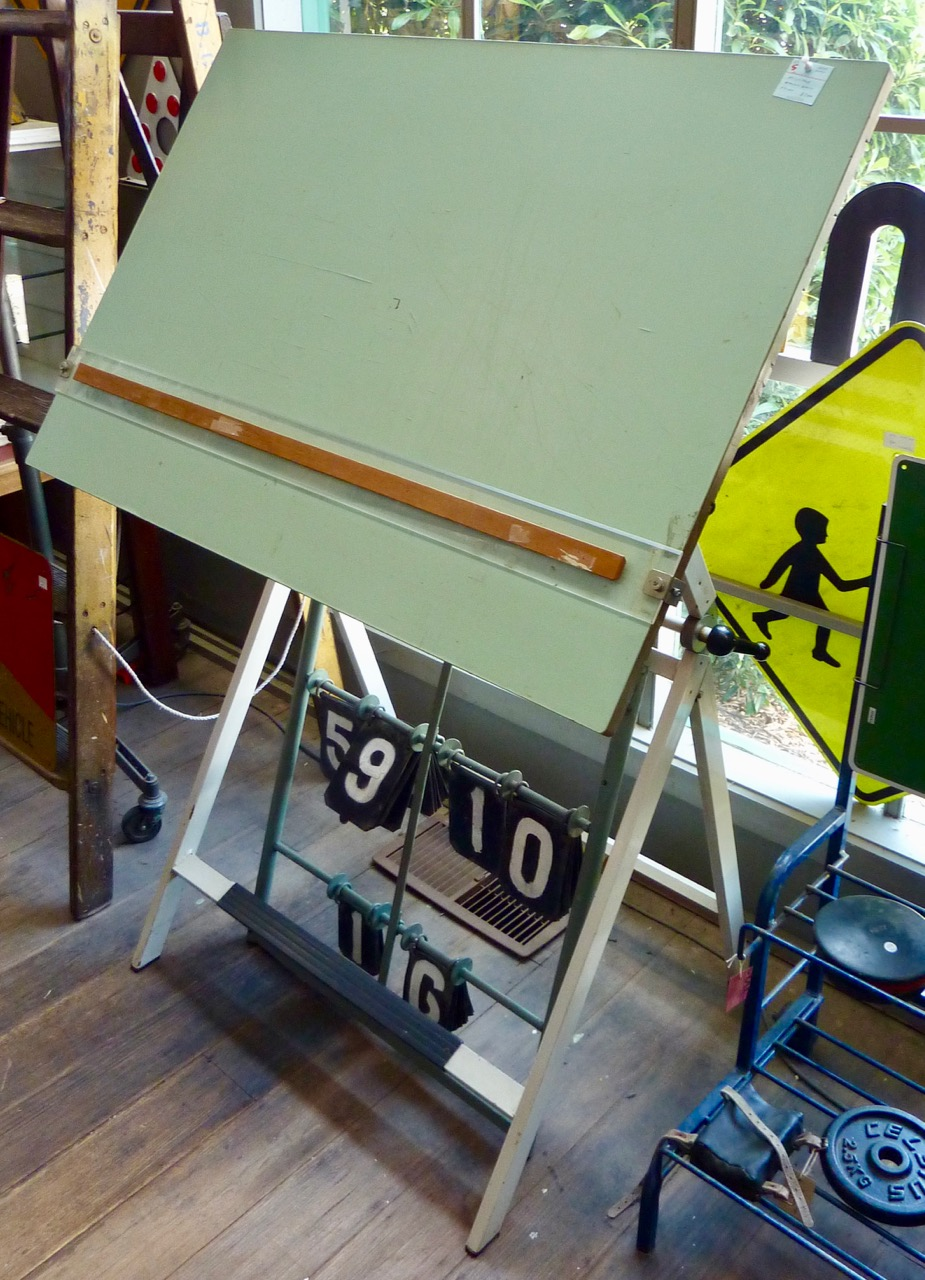
A modern drafting table with a parallel motion rule

Various types of drafting machines may be attached to the board surface to assist the draftsperson or artist. Parallel rules often span the entire width of the board and are so named because they remain parallel to the top edge of the board as they are moved up and down. Drafting machines use pre-calibrated scales and built-in protractors to allow accurate drawing measurement.

Some drafting tables incorporate electric motors to provide the up and down and angle adjustment of the drafting table surface. These tables are at least as heavy as the original oak and brass drafting tables and so sacrifice portability for the convenience of push-button table adjustment.

== Modern-day idiom ==
The expression "back to the drawing board" is used when a plan or course of action needs to be changed, often drastically; usually due to a very unsuccessful result; e.g., "The battle plan, the result of months of conferences, failed because the enemy retreated too far back. It was back to the drawing board for the army captains."

The phrase was coined in the caption to a Peter Arno cartoon of The New Yorker of March 1, 1941.

== See also ==
- List of desk forms and types
- Studio
- Surface computing
- Drafting machine
- Technical drawing tools
- Plane table
