= Cheveret desk =

Antique desk of very small size

A Cheveret desk is an antique desk of very small size which features a single drawer under the writing surface. In some occasions small drawers and pigeonholes are built on top, at the back, as in a smaller form of a bureau à gradin. It is also written with an "S", Sheveret.

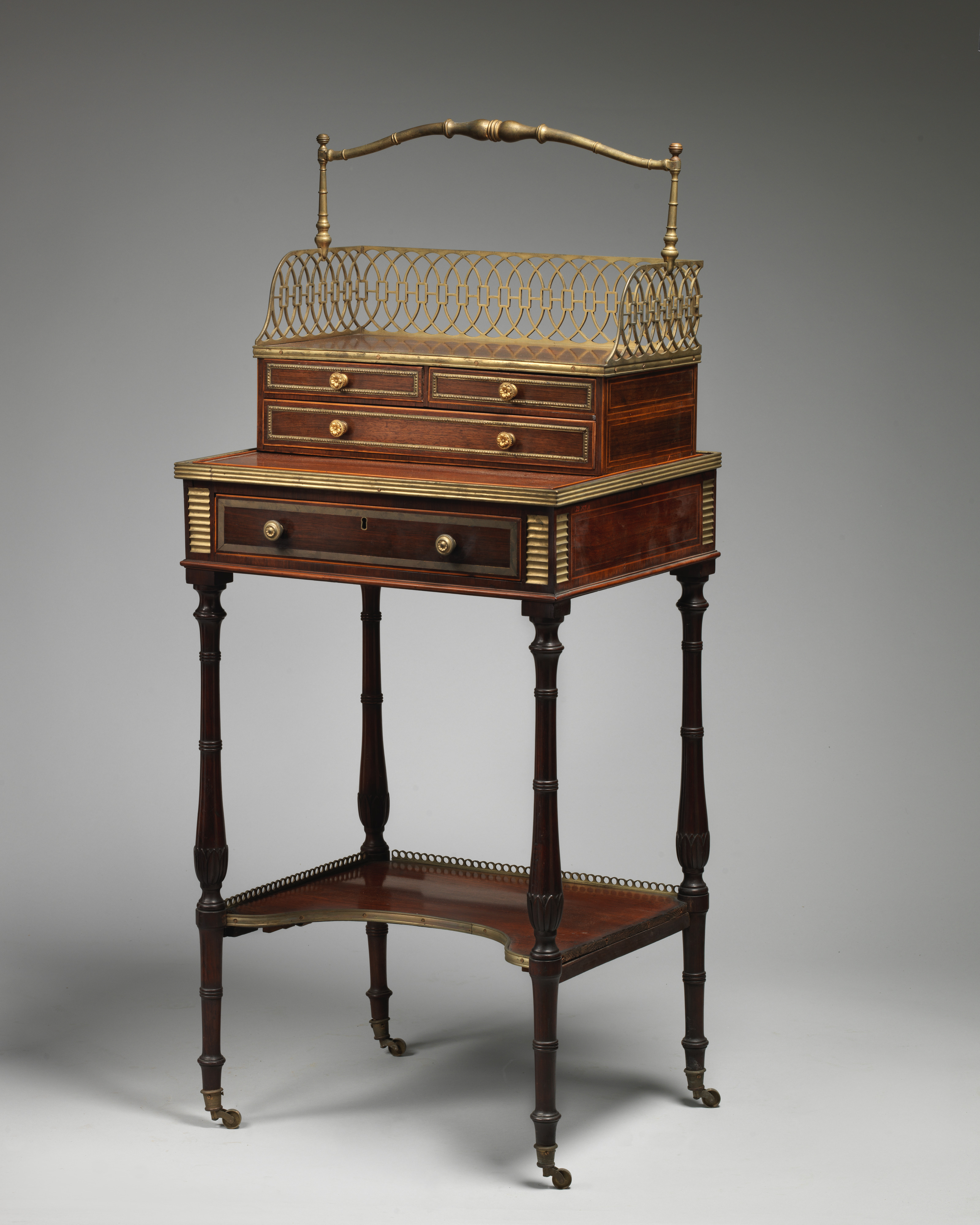
cheveret desk

Other variants of the Cheveret are much taller and have one or two shelves built between the legs, under the main drawer. They are meant to be used standing up, being then a form of standing desk.

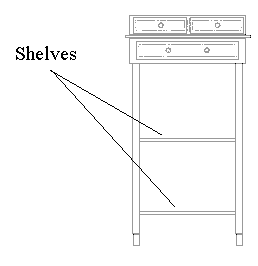
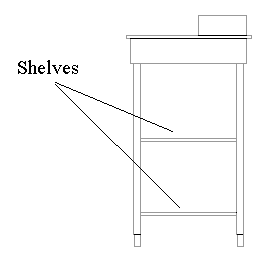

Cheverets were popular in the United Kingdom in the 18th century.

See also the List of desk forms and types.
