= Pedestal desk =

Desk with two cabinets of drawers

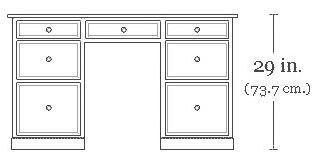
A pedestal desk

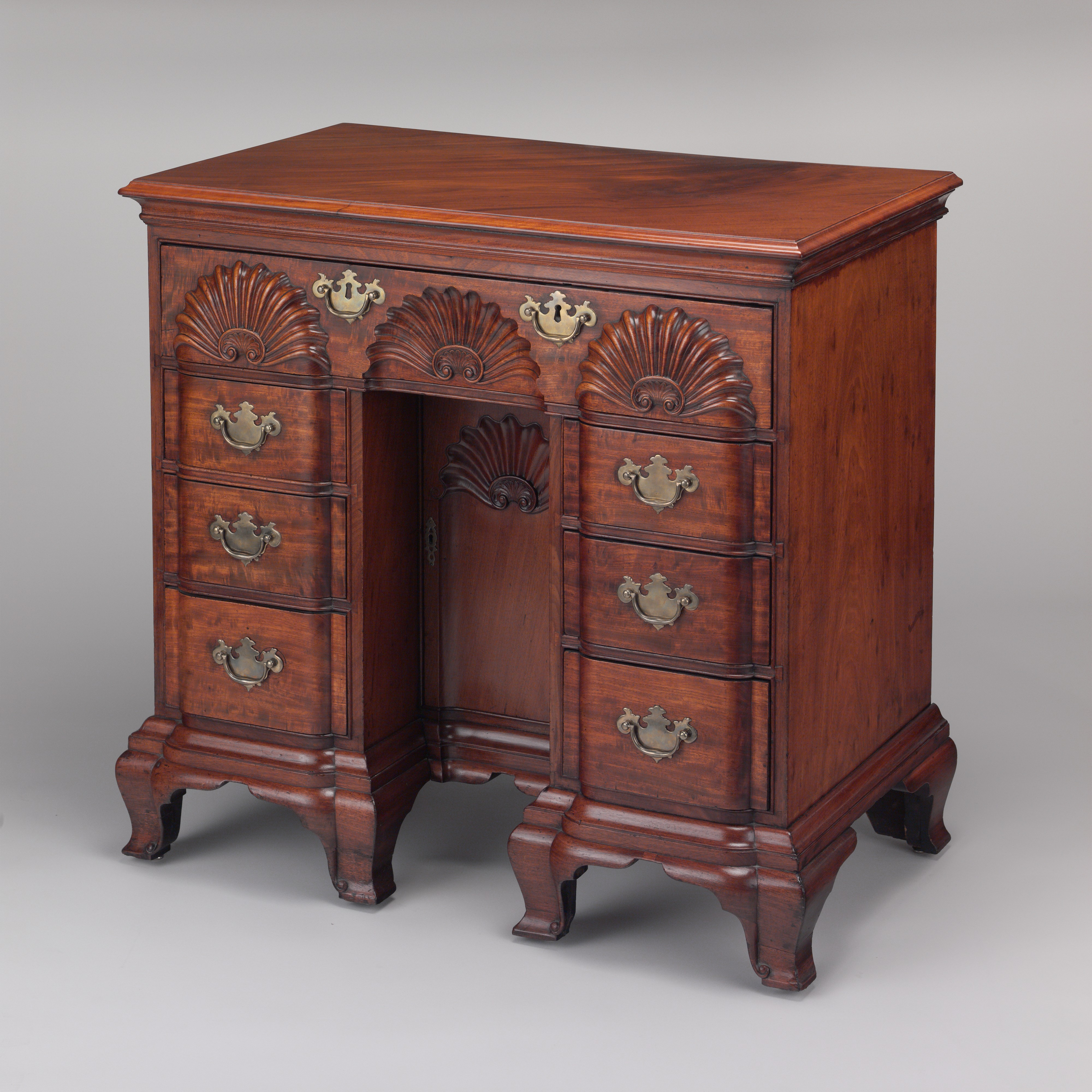
Kneehole desk (1760s-1770s)

A pedestal desk (also, when made of steel, known as a tanker desk) is usually a large, flat, free-standing desk made of a simple rectangular working surface resting on two pedestals or small cabinets of stacked drawers of one or two sizes, with plinths around the bases. Often, there is also a central large drawer above the legs and knees of the user. Sometimes, especially in the 19th century and modern examples, a "modesty panel" is placed in front, between the pedestals, to hide the legs and knees of the user from anyone else sitting or standing in front. This variation is sometimes called a "panel desk". The smaller and older pedestal desks with such a panel are sometimes called kneehole desks, they were intended for small spaces like boudoirs and were usually placed against a wall. The kneehole desks are also known as bureau tables (this is somewhat confusing, as these desks lack the actual bureau).

From the mid-18th century onwards, the pedestal desk has often had a top that is inlaid with a large panel of leather (sometimes with a gold- or blind-stamped border) or baize for a writing surface, within a cross-banded border. If the desk has a wooden top surface, it may have a pull-out lined writing drawer, or the pull-out may be fitted with a folding horse to serve as a bookrest.

Very few non-specialists call this form a pedestal desk. Most people usually refer to it as an executive desk, in contrast with the cubicle desk which is assigned to those who work under the executive. However, the term executive desk has been applied to so many desk forms as to be misleading, so the less-used but more precise "pedestal desk" has been retained here.

The pedestal desk appeared, especially in England, in the 18th century but became popular in the 19th and the 20th, overtaking the variants of the secretary desk and the writing table in sheer numbers. The French stayed faithful to the writing table or bureau plat ("flat desk"), which might have a matching paper-case (cartonnier) that stood upon it.

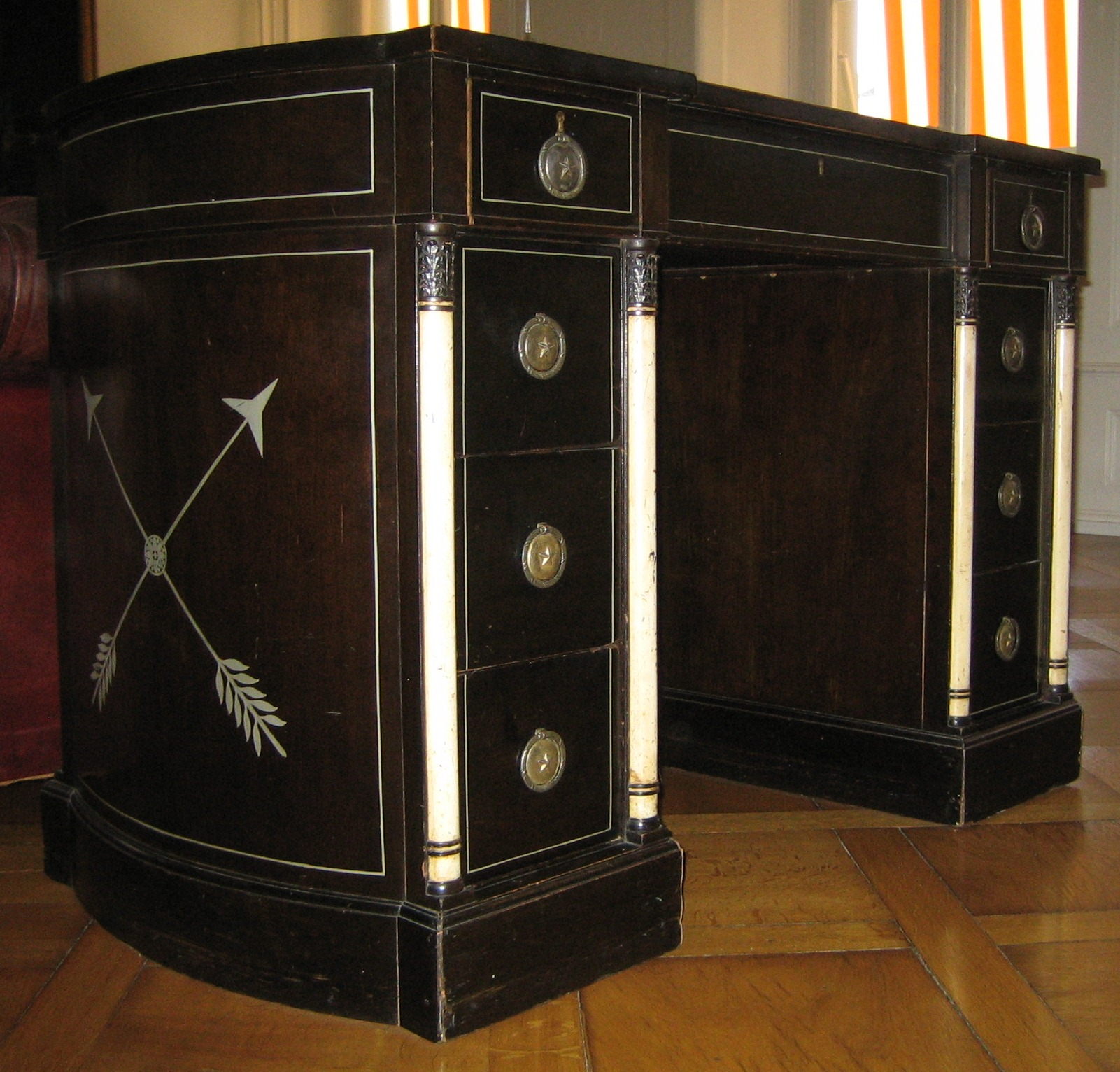
Pedestal desk in the French Empire style by Irving & Casson–A. H. Davenport Co.

There were at least two precursors to the pedestal desk: The French bureau Mazarin (a desk named for Cardinal Mazarin) of the late 17th century and the Chinese jumu desk or scholar's desk, which Europeans knew almost entirely at second-hand, largely from illustrations on porcelain. However, unlike the pedestal desk, these precursors had an incomplete stack of drawers and compartments holding up the two ends. The cases of drawers were raised about 15–30 cm (6–12 in) from the floor on legs.

When a pedestal desk is doubled in size to form a nearly square working surface, and drawers are put on both sides to accommodate two users at the same time, it becomes a partners desk. Thomas Chippendale gives designs for such tables, which were generally used in libraries, as writing tables in The Gentleman and Cabinet-Maker's Director (1753–4 and 1762).

Pedestal desks made of steel sheet metal were introduced in 1946 and were popular in America until the 1970s. Called tanker desks, these products of the post-war economy with excess of steel and processing facilities for it, were used in institutions such as schools and business and government offices.

When the pedestal desk form is cut to about two thirds of its normal width, and one of the pedestals is replaced by legs, this is then called a right pedestal desk or a left pedestal desk, depending on the position of the pedestal. This kind of form is common for a student desk.

The pedestal desk is also one of the two principal forms of the big campaign desk, used by the military in the past. It can then be considered a portable desk in a limited way since the writing surface could be easily separated from the pedestals, to facilitate transport. The three separate elements were often fitted with large handles on the sides.

== See also ==
- Computer desk
- List of desk forms and types

== Sources ==
- Aronson, Joseph. The Encyclopedia of Furniture. 3rd ed. New York: Crown Publishers, 1966.
- Charron, Andy. Desks: Outstanding Projects from America's Best Craftsmen. Taunton Press, 2000. pp. 124–144.
- Gloag, John (2013) [1st pub. 1952]. A Short Dictionary Of Furniture. Read Books Ltd. ISBN 978-1-4474-9772-1. OCLC 1099027952.
- Gloag, John. A Complete Dictionary of Furniture. Woodstock, N.Y.: Overlook Press, 1991.
- Moser, Thomas. Measured Shop Drawings for American Furniture. New York: Sterling Publishing Inc., 1985.
- Nixon, Rick (2006). Life Through Aliens (PDF) (Master of Fine Arts thesis). Waterloo, Ontario: University of Waterloo. ISBN 978-0-494-17219-3.
