= List of desk forms and types =

This is a list of different types and forms of desks.

== Desk forms and types ==
- Armoire desk
- Bargueño desk
- Bench desk
- Bible box
- Bonheur du jour
- Bureau à gradin
- Bureau brisé
- Bureau capucin
- Bureau Mazarin
- Bureau plat, see Writing table
- Butler's desk
- Campaign desk
- Carlton house desk
- Carrel desk
- Cheveret desk
- Computer desk
- Credenza desk
- Cubicle desk
- Cylinder desk
- Davenport desk
- Desk and bench
- Desk on a chest
- Desk on a frame
- Drawing table
- Ergonomic desk
- Escritoire
- Fall-front desk
- Field desk
- Fire screen desk
- Games table desk
- Lap desk
- Lectern desk
- Liseuse desk
- Mechanical desk
- Metamorphic library steps
- Moore desk
- Partners desk
- Pedestal desk
- Plantation desk
- Portable desk
- Rolltop desk
- School desk
- Secrétaire à abattant, see Fall-front desk
- Secretaire en portefeuille
- Secretary desk
- Shtender
- Slant-top desk
- Spinet desk
- Standing desk
- Student desk
- Tambour desk
- Tanker desk, see Pedestal desk
- Telephone desk
- Treadmill desk
- Trestle desk
- Typewriter desk
- Wooton desk
- Writing armchair
- Writing desk
- Writing table

== See also ==
- Bureau du Roi
- Henry VIII's writing desk
- Resolute desk
