= Moore desk =

A Moore desk is not one but two large antique desk forms.

The "Moore Office Queen" is a massive desk, made for a sitting user. From the outside it looks, when closed, much like its competitor, the Wooton desk but it differs from it in several ways. For one, it has but a single large door to lock up the main work surface and the drawers and nooks around it, while the Wooton has two. More importantly (the manufacturer liked to boast about it) the main work surface slides in and out of the main body of the desk so that work can be stopped and the desk closed without having to put away everything, as is the case for the Wooton desk.

The "Moore Office Queen" was patented in 1878 in Indiana in the United States by the Moore Combination Desk Company.

The Office Queen has a modern descendant called the armoire desk.

The "Moore Insurance Desk" is nearly twice as big as the "Office Queen" and combines a standing desk and a normal "sitting" desk in a single piece of furniture. It was patented in 1882. Like the "Office Queen" it opens up by means of a single large door, and its internal work surface slides in and out. But it also has an external work surface to accommodate a standing user, on the other side of the desk. The standing user employs the "roof" of the desk of the sitting user as his (or her) work surface.

Moore combination desks were produced in standard, extra, and superior grades. Standard grade combination desks were $110 to $185. Extra grade desks were 40% to 50% more expensive. Superior were more expensive.

In her Smithsonian monography on the Wooton desk, Betty Lawson Walters notes the relative importance of the Moore desk as a competitor to the famous Wooton desk, and traces its origin and destiny.

== See also ==
- List of desk forms and types
