= Liseuse desk =

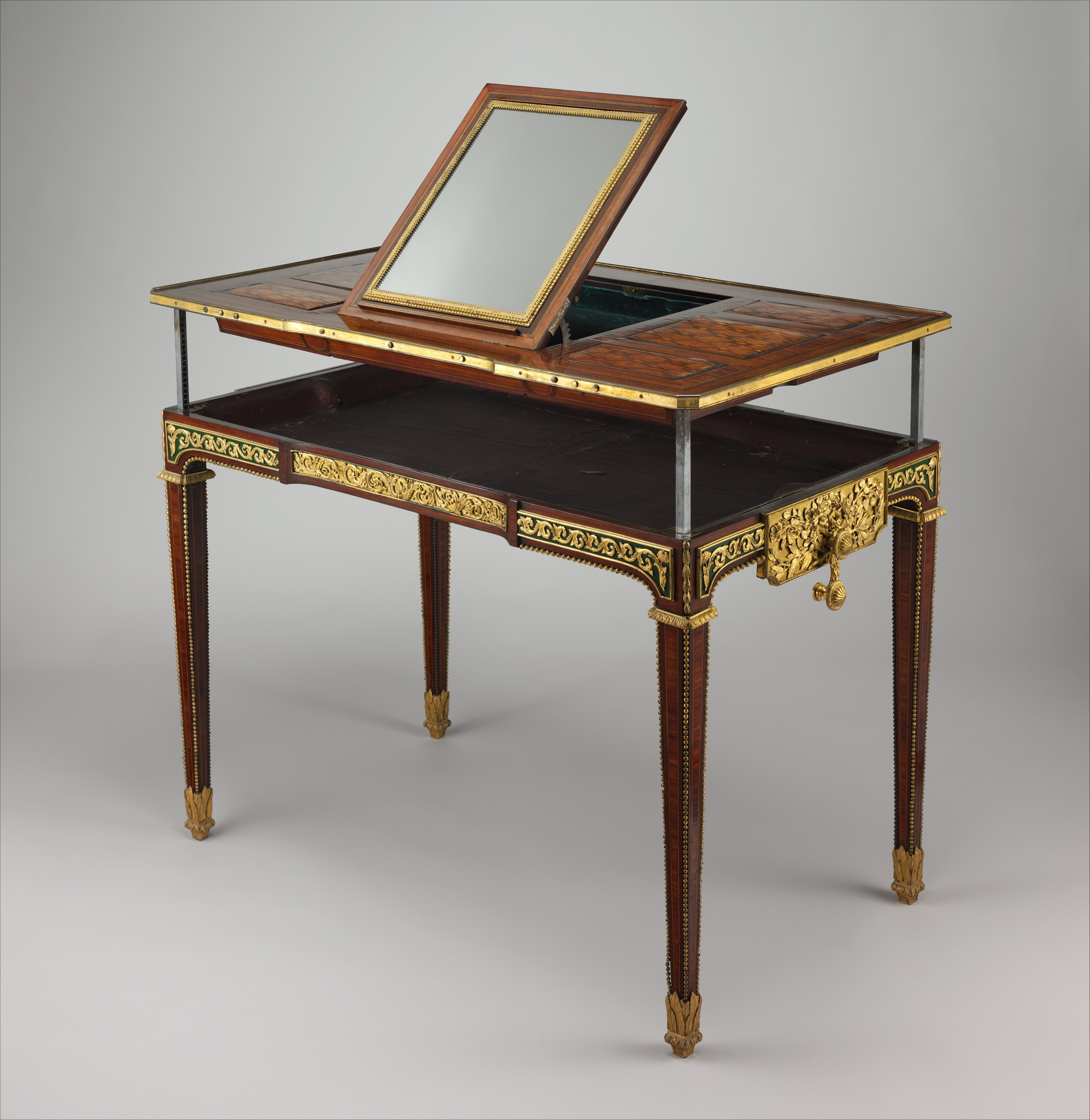
Liseuse desk

A liseuse desk or liseuse is a medium-sized writing table with a small hinged panel in the middle which can spring up by the aid of a mechanism or be propped up at a desired angle to facilitate reading, or writing on its slanted surface. Many have lateral panels which swing out on both sides to give a larger desk surface.

The name comes from "liseuse", the feminine form of "liseur" in French. This is often translated as "reader", but is often used to describe a person who really likes to read (a bookworm) and thus might use this type of desk, while a simple reader is called "lecteur", or "lectrice" in the feminine gender.

The liseuse is an antique desk form which was popular in France during the 18th century and produced again in the first part of the 19th century. It was copied in several continental countries and in the United Kingdom.

Many liseuses are polyvalent pieces of furniture with a double or triple use. Geared towards an 18th-century feminine market for the most part, they often have drawers made specially for storing toiletry and cosmetics in addition to the drawer or drawers containing paper, quill, ink and other writing implements.

See also the list of desk forms and types.

== Bibliography ==
- De Reyniès, Nicole. Le Mobilier Domestique: Vocabulaire Typologique. Paris, Ministère de la Culture et de La Communication, 1987.
