= Writing armchair =

Type of chair

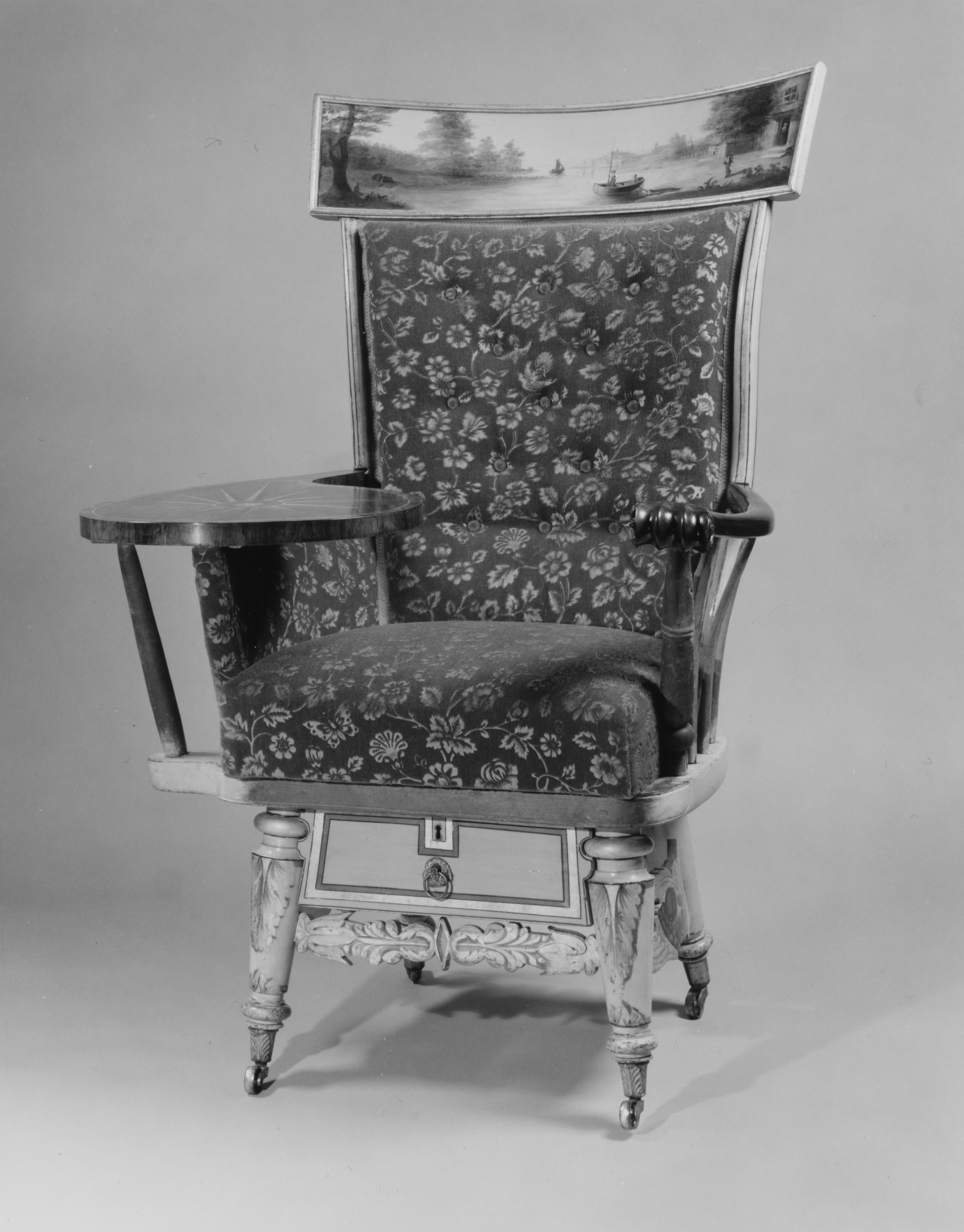
Wooden writing armchair, 1820–25.

The writing armchair has an antique and a modern form. In its antique form it is known as a writing armchair in the United States and as a tablet armchair in the United Kingdom. It is more often than not a Windsor style armchair with a circular or oval pad or tablet replacing the right arm or mounted above it. Many versions have a drawer built under the pad, to hold writing implements. Other versions have such a drawer under the seat.

On some versions the pad is on a hinge, in order to fold it down and facilitate storage, or simply take up less space in a room. In this case it is often called a drop leaf chair, and becomes a close cousin to the mechanical desk.

In its modern form it is, most of the time, the most compact rendition of a school desk or a student desk, and it is manufactured in metal and plastic. It is available in a wide variety of sizes to suit the changing needs of growing children. It also differs from the antique form by being relatively ambidextrous: The tablet or pad is available for the right arm or the left arm, to also suit those who write with their left hand. Unlike the antique form, the arm with no pad is usually completely absent, to ease entry in the chair in the crowded conditions of a schoolroom or lecture hall.

Modern designers have offered several contemporary renditions of the writing armchair or the drop leaf chair, but the form has never been very popular in homes.

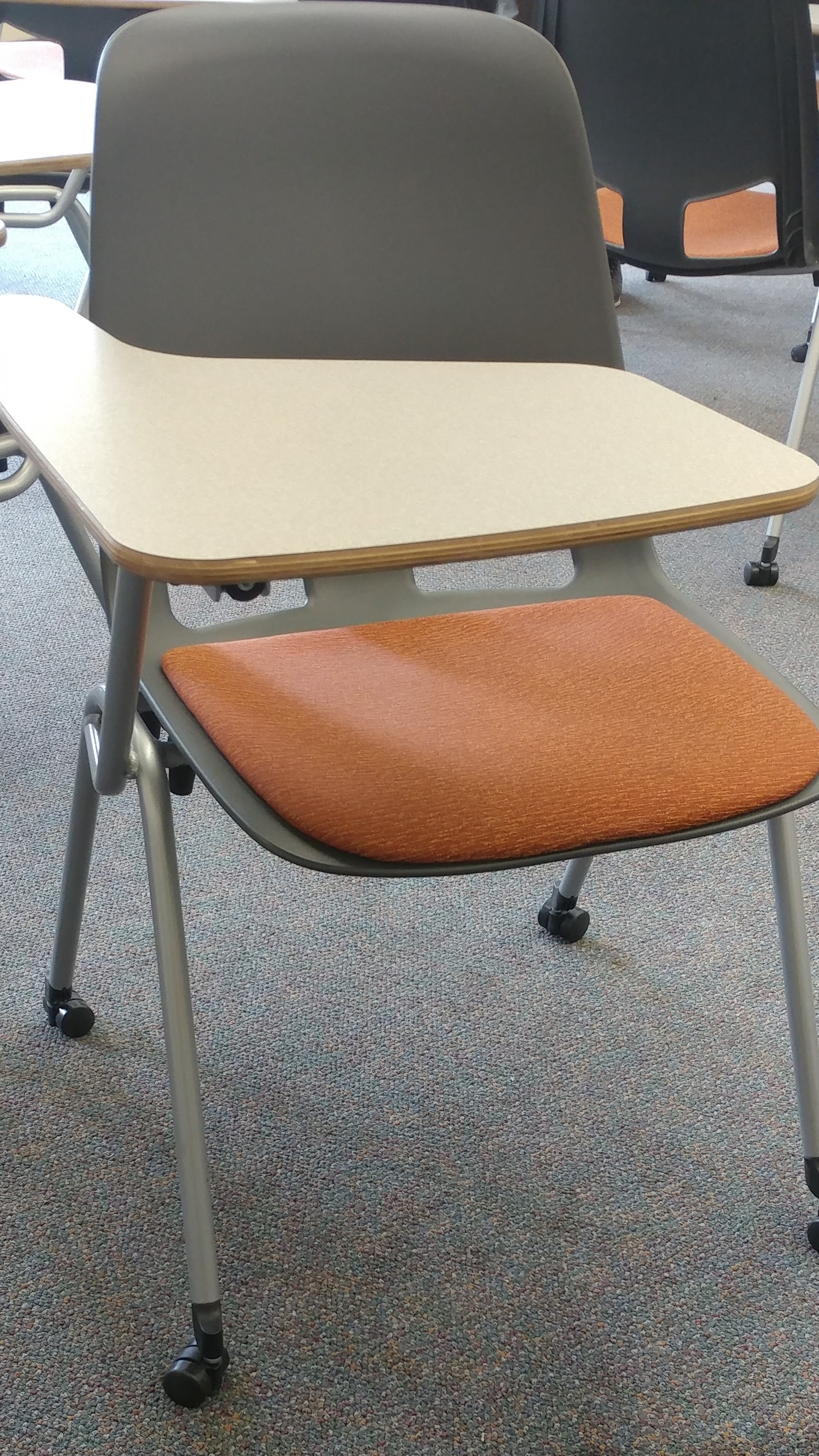
Modern student desk, photographed in 2017

== See also ==
- List of desk forms and types
- List of chairs
