= Games table desk =

Desk with board game pattern

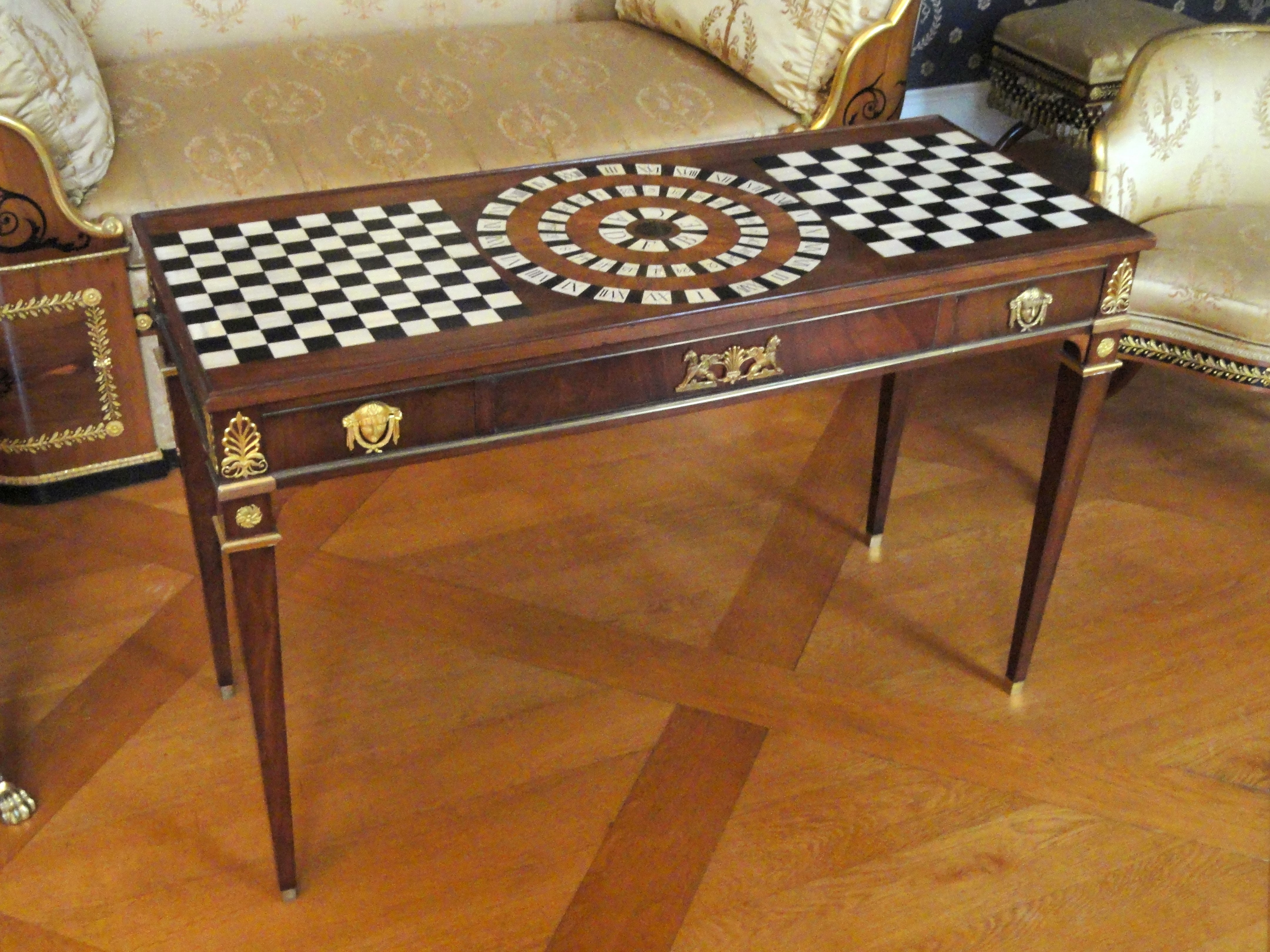
Game table

A games table desk is an antique desk form which has a writing surface etched or veneered in the pattern of a given board game. It also provides sufficient storage space for writing implements and a separate space for storing game accessories such as counters. It is often called a "games table" or game table, which leads to confusion with pieces of furniture (antique or modern) which are built specifically for gaming only, with no intention or provision for use as a desk.

== History ==
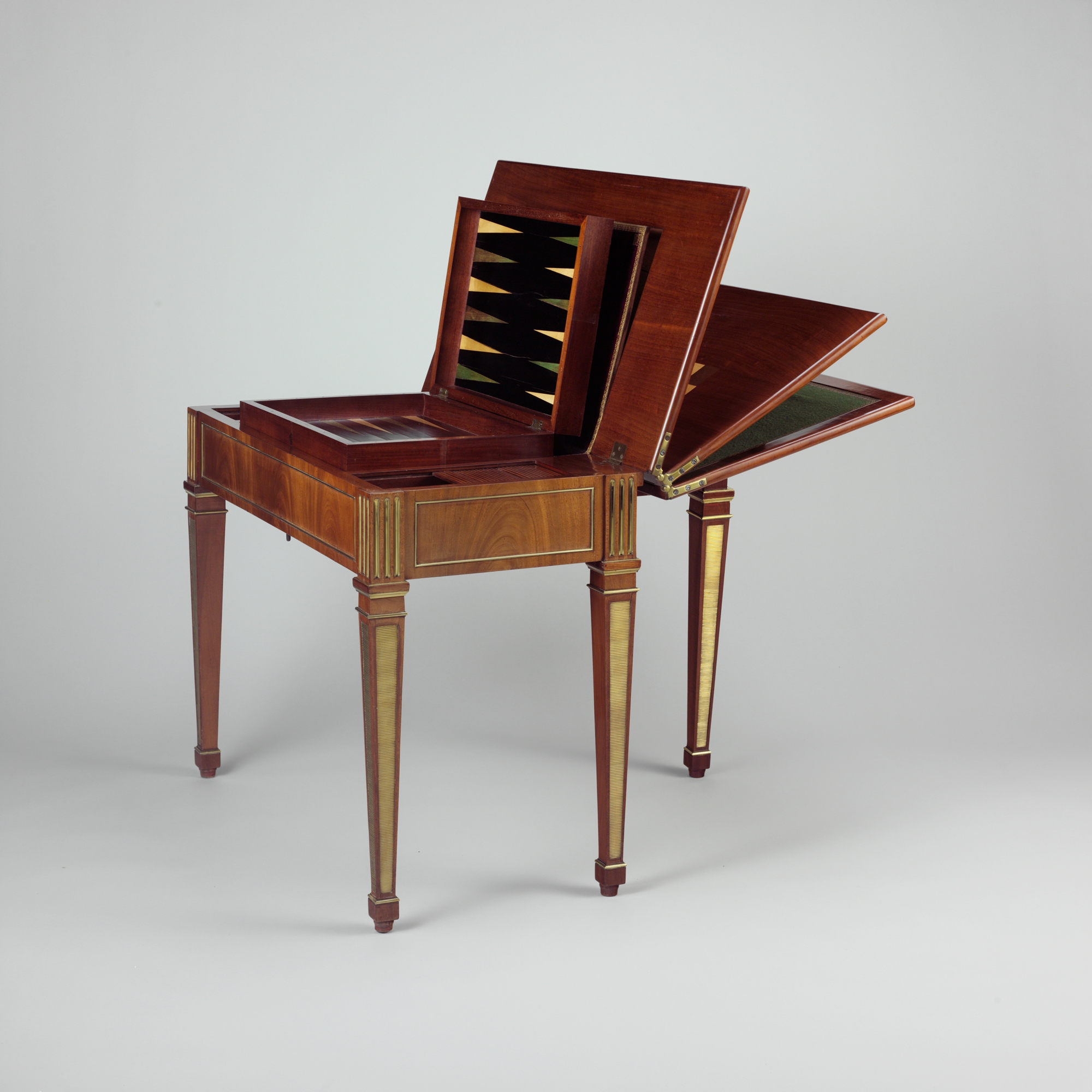
Folding games table including backgammon

With the gradual creation of specialized rooms in the homes of the nobility and of the richer members of society during the 18th century, specialized furniture followed. Instead of having large halls which could be transformed quickly into a dining room, ballroom, or audience chamber (thanks to big, sturdy transportable furniture), the trend now was towards a large number of smaller rooms in which smaller and more delicate specialized furniture stayed in permanence.

Just before the French Revolution furniture out-specialized itself. Only the extremely rich could afford to have items of furniture for every possible activity: a dresser for cosmetics, a commode for toiletry, a lady's desk for writing during most of the year and a lady's Fire screen desk for cold evenings, equivalent desks for the gentleman, a game table for chess, another one for checkers, a billiards table, and so on. This is when furniture giving dual use or triple use became popular among those who were merely rich and could not afford having cabinet makers constantly making new items for their homes. One of the most popular of these combinations was the games table desk.

=== Variations ===
The games table desk has a great variety of forms. Like most of the desks of that period it was built on commission to whatever new design, or modification of an old design, the customer might want. Most of them have in common a double-sided top, covered on one side with a gaming board and on the other side with tooled leather or some other material suitable for placing paper on it and writing with a quill. The top board is sometimes attached loosely and sometimes very securely to the main body of the desk, and it is sometimes hinged. Some desks have not one but several top boards, kept stacked on one another, each having a different board game design on it.

Games table top turned to plain side

Games table with chess and backgammon boards exposed

== See also ==
- List of desk forms and types
