= Desk on a frame =

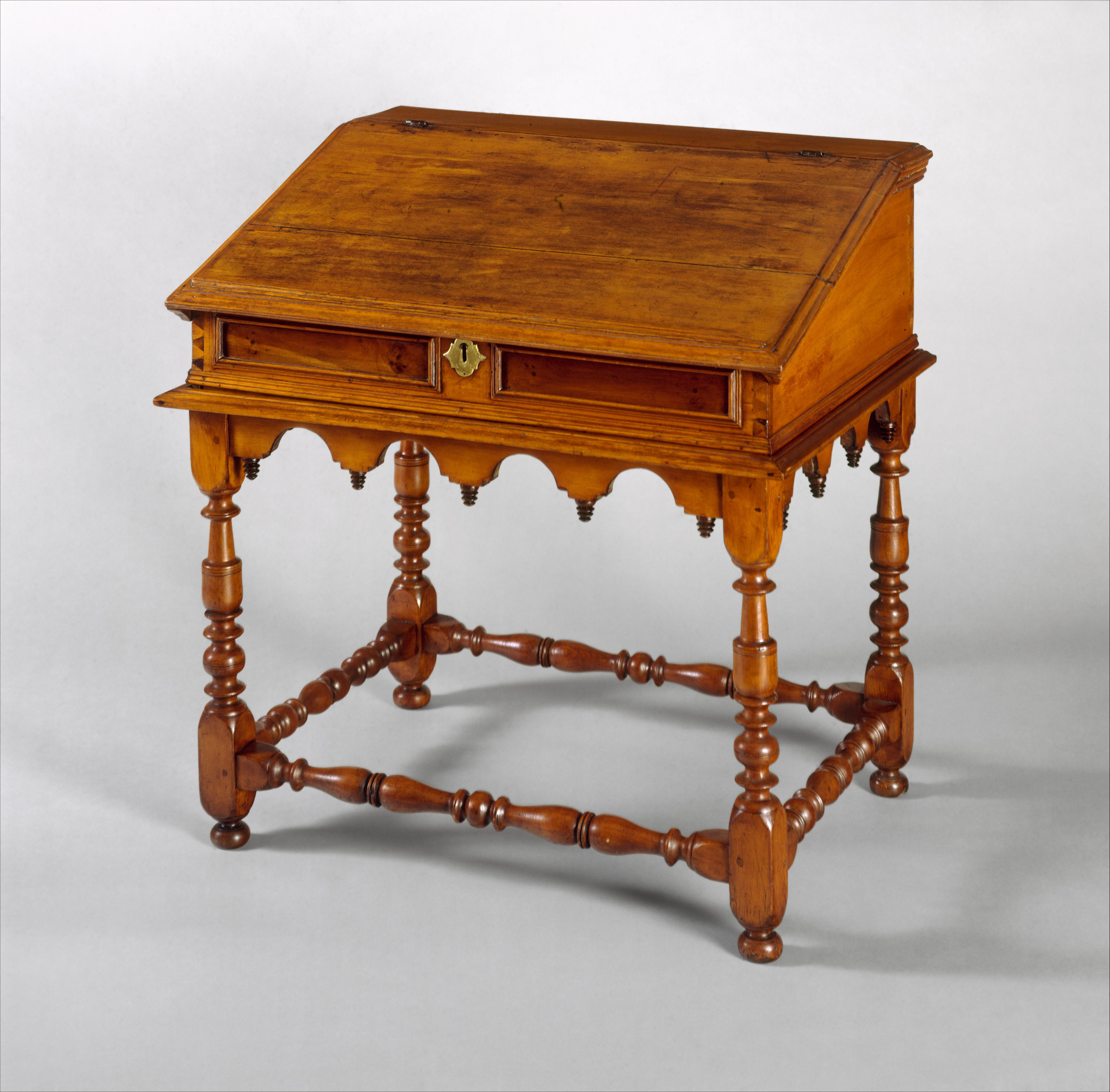
Desk-on-frame

The desk on a frame (or desk on frame) is usually an antique form made up of two pieces of furniture. The first piece is a fairly large and closable portable desk with a slanted hinged top giving access to the writing surface and utility nooks and small drawers. The second piece is a stand made for it in the same style and material. It is also sometimes a single piece of furniture which looks as if it were made up of the two previous pieces but is in fact solid and nondetachable. This form was popular in Colonial America and was often done in the Queen Anne style.

The slant top desk is a direct morphological descendant. In a sense the Spanish Bargueño (or Vargueño) desk is a distant cousin of the two piece version, since the Bargueño is also made up of a portable desk and a stand constructed specially for it, using the same materials and style.

== See also ==
- List of desk forms and types
