= Typewriter desk =

Desk ergonomically designed for typists

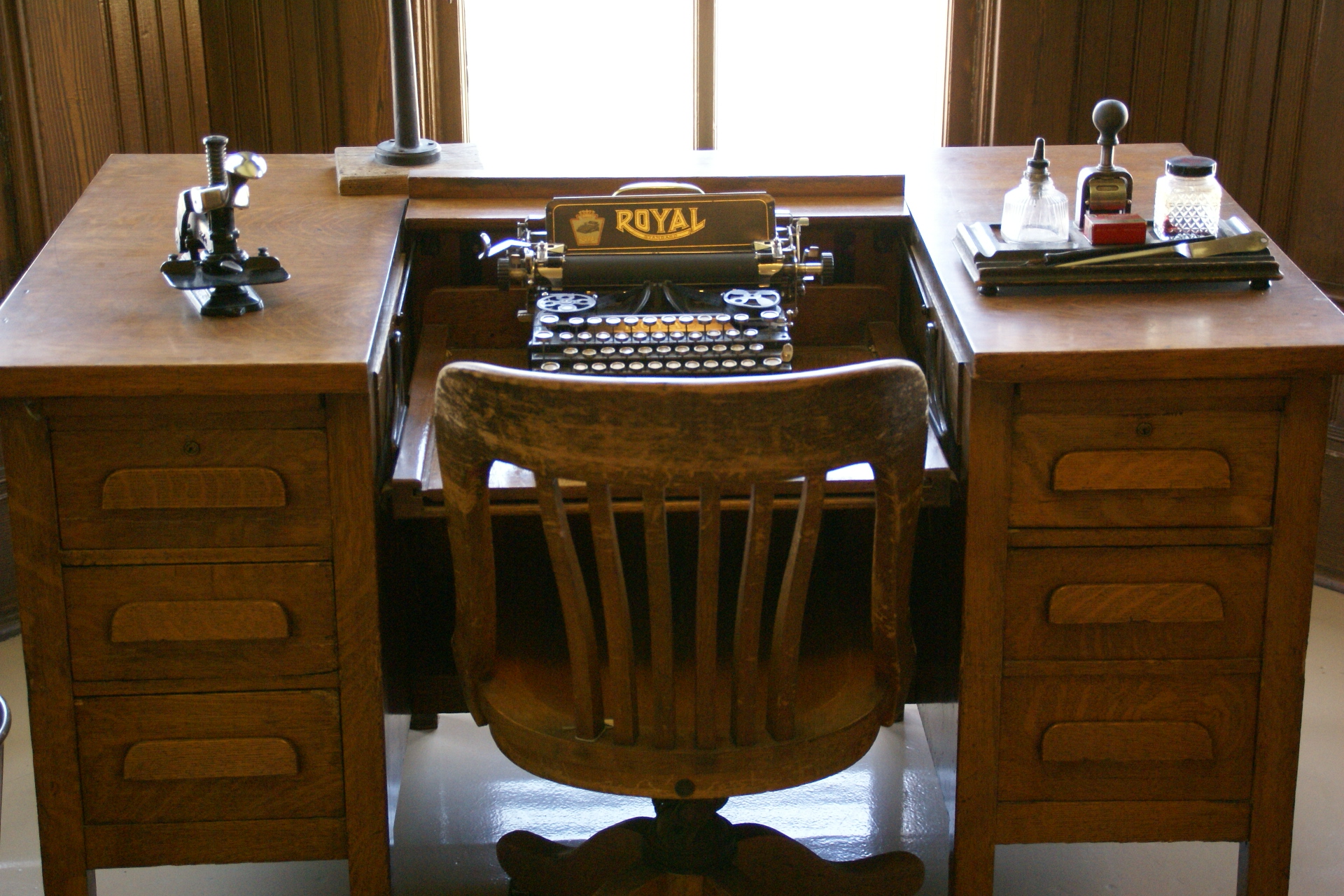
Desk and typewriter at the former train station (Nevada Northern Railway Museum) in East Ely, Nevada

A typewriter desk (also sometimes called a typewriter table or typing table) is a desk form meant to hold a typewriter at the proper height for the typist's hands while still allowing a seat height that is low enough to be comfortable for the typist's feet. This height is usually a few inches lower than the 29-inch (740 mm) height of the traditional desk. Without a proper typing desk or table, professional or student typists would sit on cushions or thick telephone books, so that their hands would be in the proper position to type comfortably.

The first generations of typewriters, in the last quarter of the 19th century and the first decades of the 20th, spurred the invention and production of a variety of typewriter desks.

All of the early typewriter desks were sturdy since typewriters needed to be heavy in order to maintain the alignment of the moving parts and not skid over the desk when the carriage was moved. Although newer and portable models became lighter, all-day typing on a portable machine was slower and uncomfortable compared to typing on a heavier office model.

Originally, typewriters were very costly machines which one tried to protect from dust or accidents. They were also very ungainly or even ugly to those unfamiliar with them, and getting them out of sight was useful for aesthetic reasons. Therefore, early typewriter desks often had some method for hiding the typewriter or getting it out of the way within the desk, sometimes by swiveling or turning it. Also, a "typist" was of lower status than was a "secretary" or general office worker, so if the machine could be moved out of view except when needed, the desk was no longer just for typing.

After World War I typewriters gradually became less costly and more common; the typewriter desk was more or less standardized into a few forms: the regular desk with a depressed center section, an L-shaped desk with a permanent or hinged (after removing the typewriter) lower level for the typewriter at the side, and versions incorporating lowering or hiding mechanisms.

A popular alternative was the "typing table", a low table just large enough for the typewriter (so that it could be rolled up to another desk) on thin legs with casters, equipped with brakes so that it would not roll away. Frequently such tables had hinged side-leaves to hold the typist's copy when used stand-alone, but also allowing them to also be used next to a desk.

== See also ==
- List of desk forms and types
