= Step chair =

Multi-functional piece of furniture

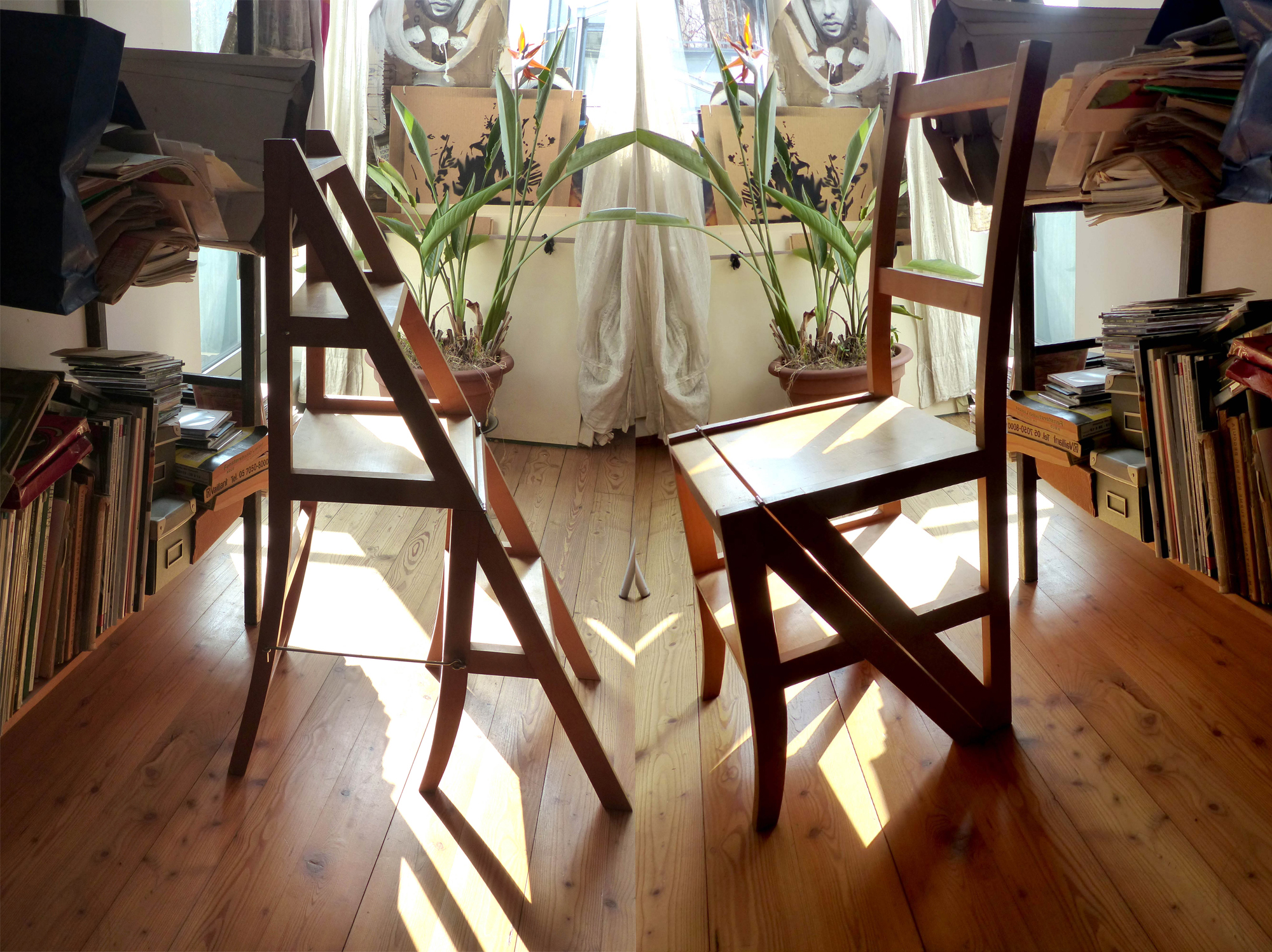
Composite photo of a step chair, of the common diagonal-side-cut type. The chair is shown facing in the same direction, once folded into a chair, and once folded into a set of steps, such that the top of the chair back touches the floor.

A step chair, also called a ladder chair, a library chair, a convertible chair or a Franklin chair, is a piece of furniture which folds to become either a chair or a small set of steps or stairs. Building one (usually in the diagonal-side-cut style) is a popular DIY project.

It is sometimes claimed that these chairs were designed by Benjamin Franklin. Franklin himself preferred to sit in a step chair he designed for his own library. This chair folded in a slightly different way from the common diagonal-side-cut step chair; the seat flips up, resting against the reclined back of the chair, and forming three steps; one formerly hidden under and parallel to the seat, and two attached vertically along the seat's front edge and midline.

A variant form has a third position, in which the back of the chair becomes an ironing-board. This design was common in the 1700s, but was revived in the 1990s. It has been described as suitable for small apartments. Its design is sometimes attributed to Thomas Jefferson, and thus called a Jefferson chair. This type is also known as three-in-one chair, bachelor chair, or onit chair.

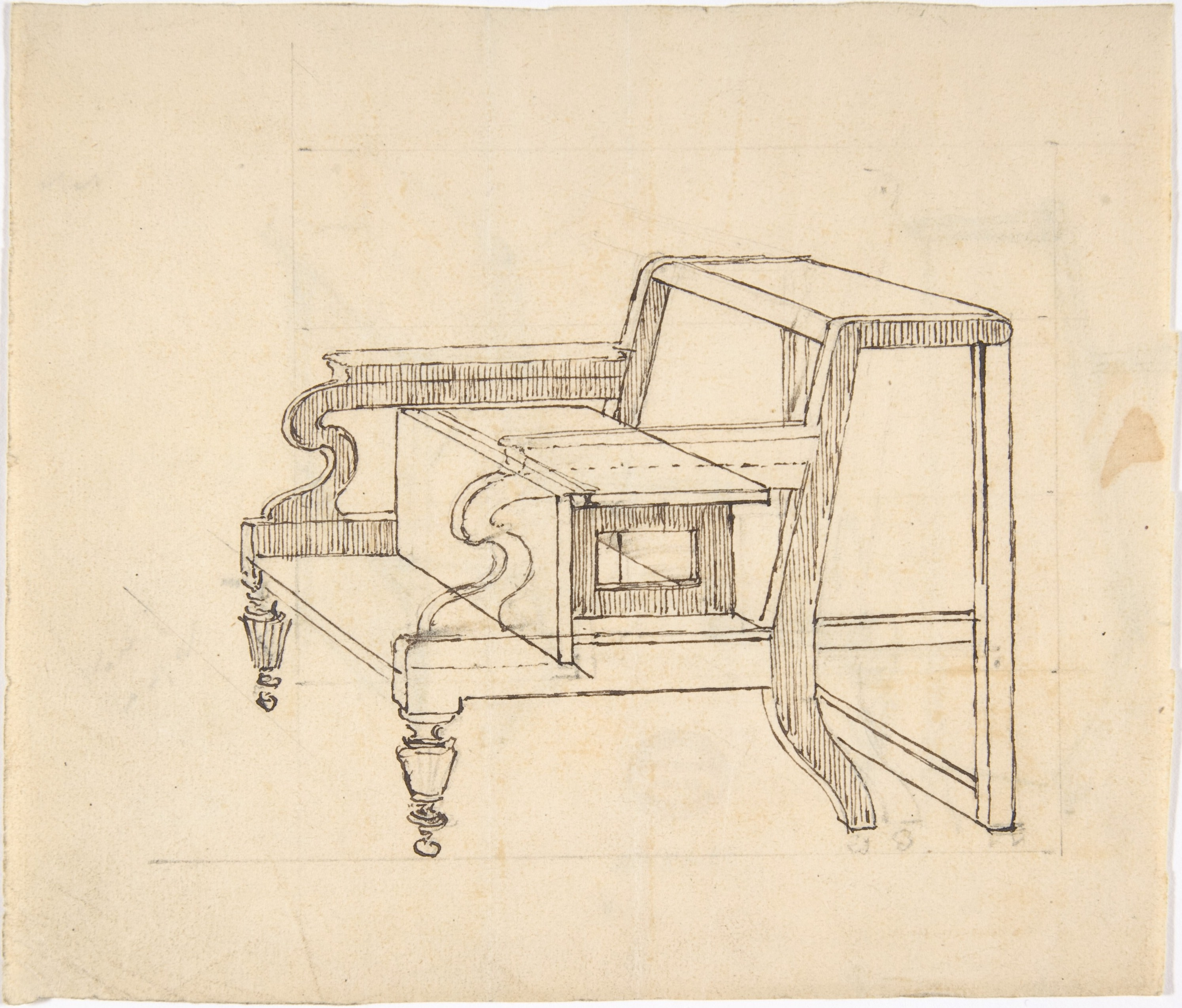
A type of step chair in which the seat folds to form the top and side faces of an extra step, and a support slides in beneath it

== See also ==
- Monks bench, multi-functional furniture that can switch between being used as a bench or a table
- Metamorphic library steps, furniture that converts from a small set of steps to a chair or desk
- Step stool, combined stool and small set of steps or stair
