= Butler's desk =

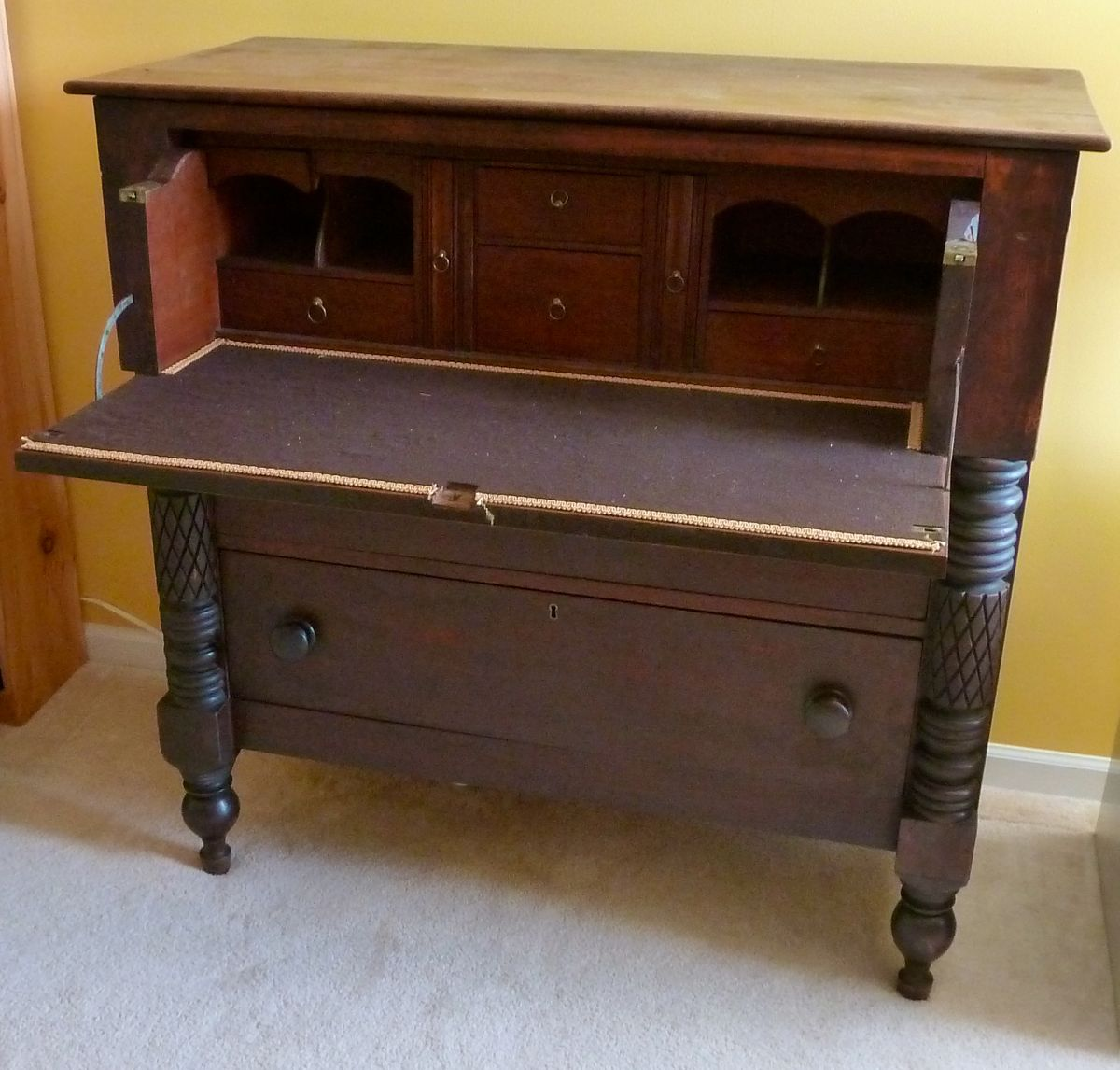
An early 19th century southern pine butler's desk from North Carolina.

In England, the butler's desk, a piece of furniture designed for those in service to fine houses to keep documents and records, was eminently practical and based on the ever-growing needs of an increasingly literate group of persons in service. In the United States, the butler's desk is a form of cupboard with curved sides, three drawers in the frieze, a writing drawer below and central and side cupboards.

== Usage ==
While the lord of the house commanded the final say in all matters, the need to delegate certain tasks to the highest ranking servant of the house necessitated a specific location where records could be kept. Following the founding of both Oxford and Cambridge, an increasingly literate aristocracy replaced the largely uneducated peerage. As the power of England grew, so did the wealth of the elite as did the need of the great houses of England to bring in a better informed class of help. This better educated servant class permitted the person so designated to acquire supplies and obtain services to maintain and run large buildings with many servants.

The earliest form of butler's desk was a high desk for use by a standing person. It had many drawers of different size and had locks on both the drop front (which later developed) and individual drawers - the size of the drawers being governed by the size of the documents they contained and for personal use (some of the larger drawers being used for the butlers clothes in order to save space in the head butlers personal room). Many of these desks would have a secret compartment reserved for any important documents that were entrusted to the head butler by the master.

By the 1850s the butler's desk became far more stylistically diffuse. There were many instances where the desk of the lord of the manor was handed down to the head of the house. As the role of the butler became more oriented to a kind of overall manager and coordinator for household functions, the taller earlier desk was abandoned for a more practical piece of furniture.
