= Wooton desk =

Variation of the fall front desk

Wooton Rockefeller desk

The Wooton desk is a variation of the fall front desk, native to Indianapolis, Indiana, and produced from 1874 to 1890.

== History ==
Indianapolis, Indiana entrepreneur William S. Wooton obtained patents for his desk design in 1874. The desk was introduced at a time when the small business owner was seeing an increase in daily correspondence. With this increase in paperwork came the need for adequate storage and retrieval of files. An early advertisement for the Wooten desk described the model as follows:

Everything that ingenuity can suggest or devise to facilitate desk labor, has been introduced in our secretary...Its comprehensive character is such that ample accommodations are afforded for the requirements of the most voluminous business. Every facility is furnished for a thorough and systematic classification of books, papers, memorandums, etc. Through its aid the usual fret and worry of office work is converted into a positive pleasure. It is a miniature counting-house, with a combination of such conveniences as are found best adapted for the manipulation of office work, and these all under one lock and key.

Soon after the Wooten desk‘s introduction the reservoir-based fountain pen and typewriter became popular and produced greater quantities of office documents than its pigeon hole style storage system could accommodate. Production ceased in 1890.

== Design ==
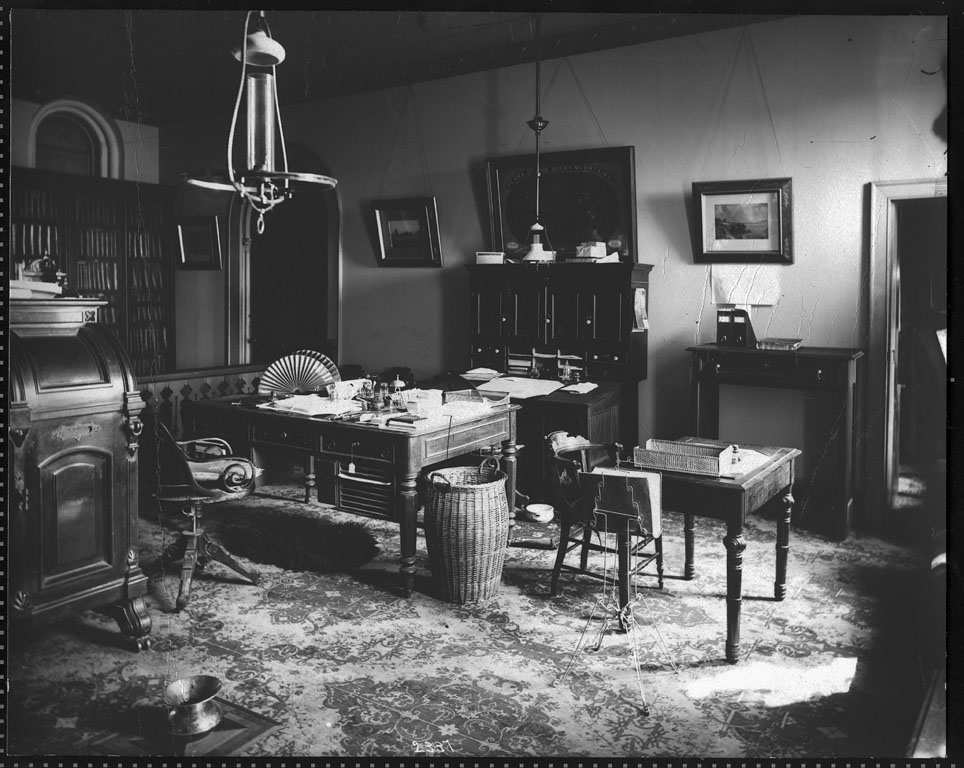
A Wooton desk (on the left) in the office of Spencer Fullerton Baird at the Smithsonian Institution Building, 1878

Wooton desks were not the costliest desks in series production, but they did utilize the most drawers, nooks, and crannies of all the designs available. Only a few examples of the cupboard desk had more divisions, but they were of a very utilitarian style and were often produced by the families or communities which used them, such as the Shakers. The armoire desk is the closest modern relative to the Wooton desk in its size and form. However, the armoire desk is even larger than the Wooton, and despite the use of rich veneers by some makers, is a much more practical piece of furniture.

The Wooton secretary desk rests on a four-legged quadruped support equipped with casters. The main body of the desk is filled with dozens of small drawers and nooks for papers and small objects.

As in a "secrétaire à abattant," or fall front desk, the main working surface or desktop is hinged and lifted completely from the horizontal to the vertical in order to lock up the desk, forcing the user to gather up and store all papers and implements beforehand. Unlike the secrétaire à abattant however, the Wooton desktop hides only a few of the small drawers and nooks. The real lockup is done by closing two massive hinged panels which are as deep as the desk and filled with drawers and nooks of all sizes.

Wooton desks in good condition are sometimes sold in auctions for the same price as a top-of-the-line luxury automobile.

== See also ==
- List of desk forms and types
- Mechanical desk

== Sources ==
- Boyce, Charles, Dictionary of Furniture, 2nd ed. New York: Roundtable Press Book, 2001.
- Gloag, John, A Complete Dictionary of Furniture, Woodstock, N.Y. : Overlook Press, 1991.
- Showalter, Camille, and Janice Driesbach, Wooton Patent Desks: A Place for Everything and Everything in Its Place (1983) ISBN 0-253-28930-0
- Walters, Betty Lawson, The King of Desks: Wooton's Patent Secretary, Smithsonian Studies in History and technology #3, Washington: Smithsonian Institution Press, 1969.
