= Bargueño desk =

Form of portable desk

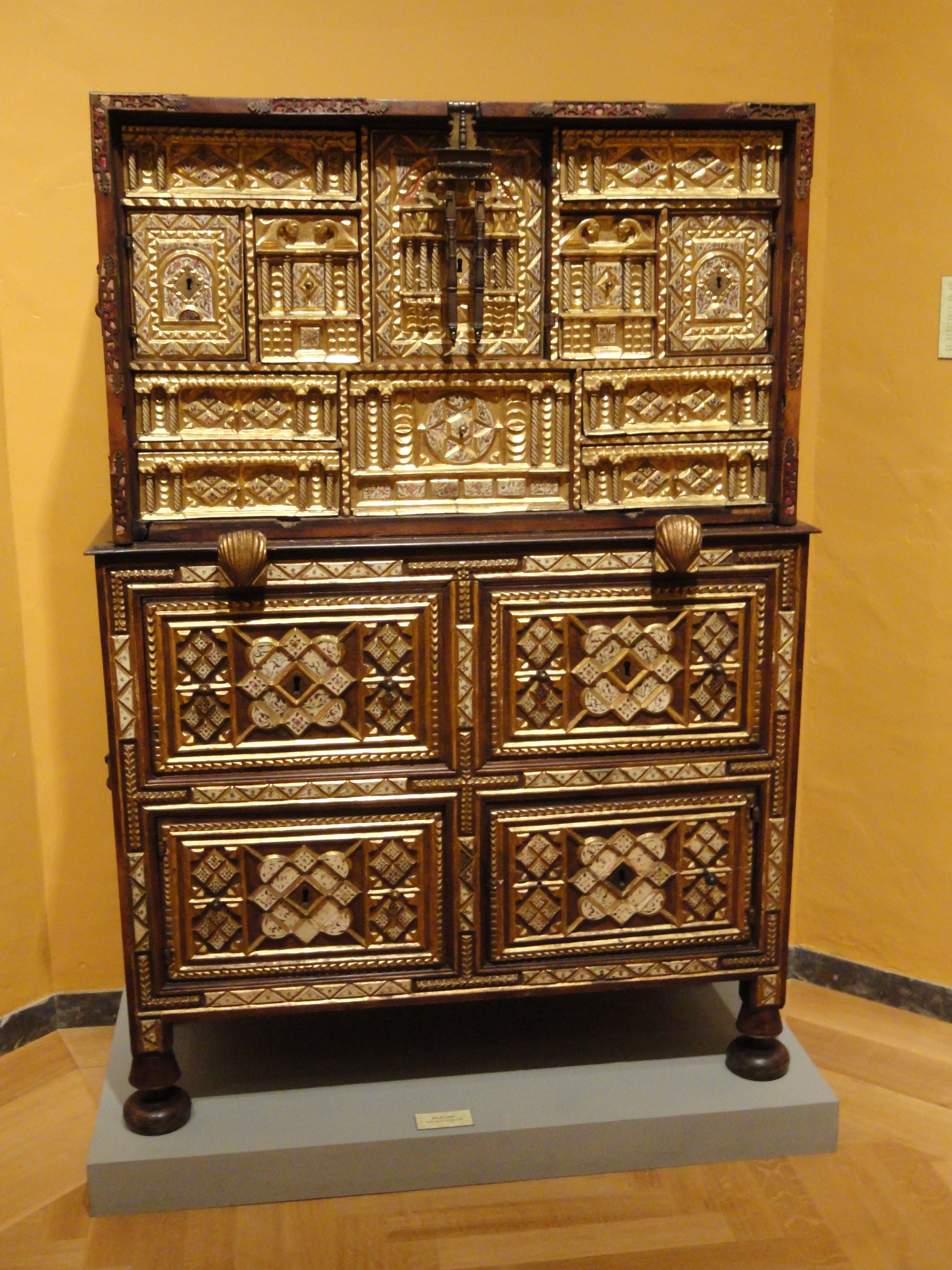
Bargueño on a taquillon base, Spain, 17th century

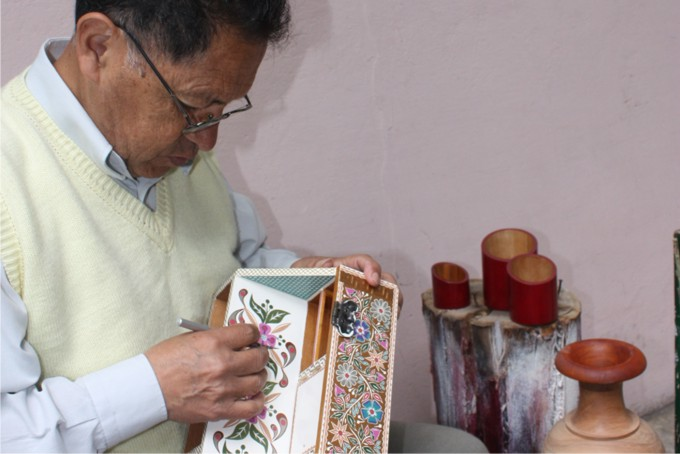
Creating a bargueño

In cabinetry, the bargueño (or vargueño, both pronounced [baɾˈɣeɲo]; meaning "from Bargas") is a form of portable desk, made up of two chests, the bottom one usually having drawers (called a taquillón) and the top one having a hinged desk surface which also serves as a side-mounted lid. It is basically a chest or box with one of the side panels, rather than the top panel, serving as a fold-out writing surface. The interior of the desk is equipped with small drawers, pigeonholes, etc., for storing papers and supplies. The bargueño has also been used for sewing or as a jewel chest.

The bargueño desk originated in Renaissance Spain. The desk was typically made of wood, with sturdy iron handles located on each side, to make transporting it relatively easy. A bargueño could be set down on any solid table, but often had a ready-made support for it: either a taquillón, a chest of drawers in the same material and style as the bargueño; or a pie de puente, a small trestle table. As a general rule, the interior of a bargueño is much more richly decorated than the exterior. Thus a bargueño looking very plain from the exterior will have a reasonably rich and well sculpted interior, while a bargueño with impressive exterior decorations will have a truly ornate and extremely rich interior.

Bargueño desks were first produced in the 15th century and were popular through the 16th, 17th and 18th centuries. After a lull in the 19th century, they became again popular as antiques in the 20th century and continue to be produced today. The only other style of desk which is known to have been continuously produced for so long is the trestle desk, but some authorities exclude this desk from consideration because in early times it also served as a dining table and money lender's counter.

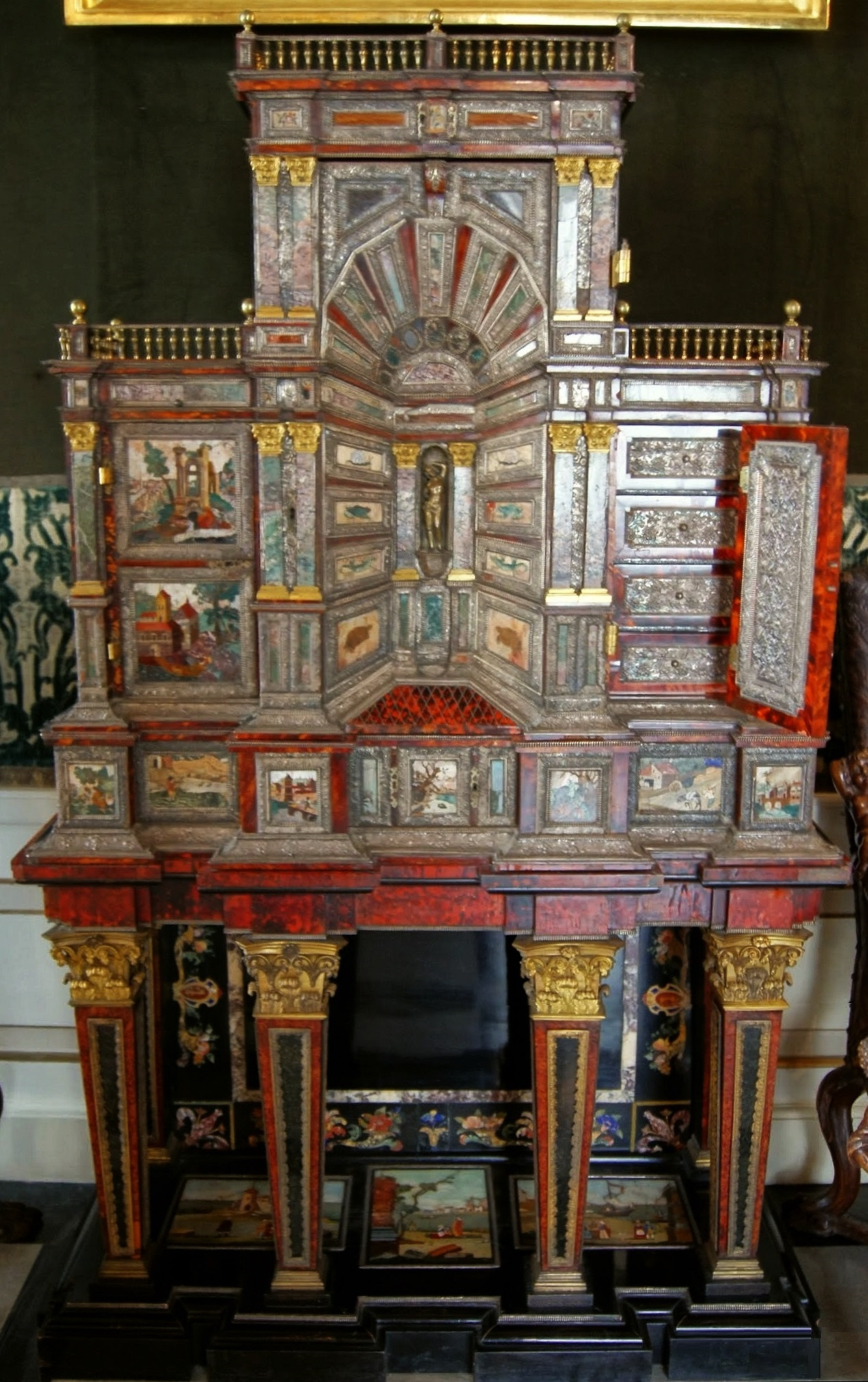
Florentine pietra dura cabinet with several doors and drawers is a typical example of Late Baroque furniture inlaid with precious materials (National Museum in Warsaw, displayed in the Wilanów Palace).

The only other major antique combination of a large portable desk and a frame is the more delicate desk on a frame of the 18th century, which was popular in Colonial America. When the top and bottom chests are permanently attached or built as one piece there is a desk form called a Fall front desk. It is supposed that the fall front desk form gradually evolved from the desk on a chest towards the end of the Renaissance.

== See also ==
- List of desk forms and types

== Bibliography ==
- Aguiló Alonso, María Paz. Escritorios y bargueños españoles. Spanish bargueños and writing chests. Ministerio de Economía y Empresa. Madrid 2018. ISBN 978-84-92546-47-3.
