= Bureau à gradin =

A bureau à gradin is an antique desk form resembling a writing table. It has one or several tiers of small drawers and pigeonholes built on part of the desktop surface. The drawers and pigeonholes usually face the user directly, but they can also surround three sides of the desk, as is the case for the Carlton house desk form. A small, portable version is a bonheur du jour.

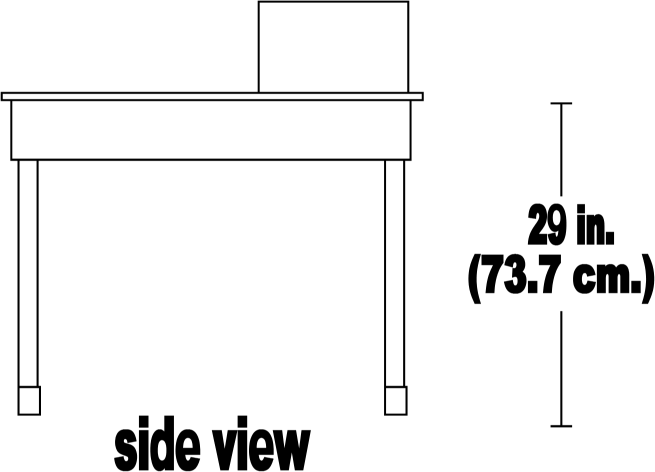

In some cases, the bureau à gradin has a second tier of drawers under the work surface, making it look like an advanced form of the bureau Mazarin or a non-enclosed version of the cylinder or tambour desk.

== See also ==
- List of desk forms and types
