= Mechanical desk =

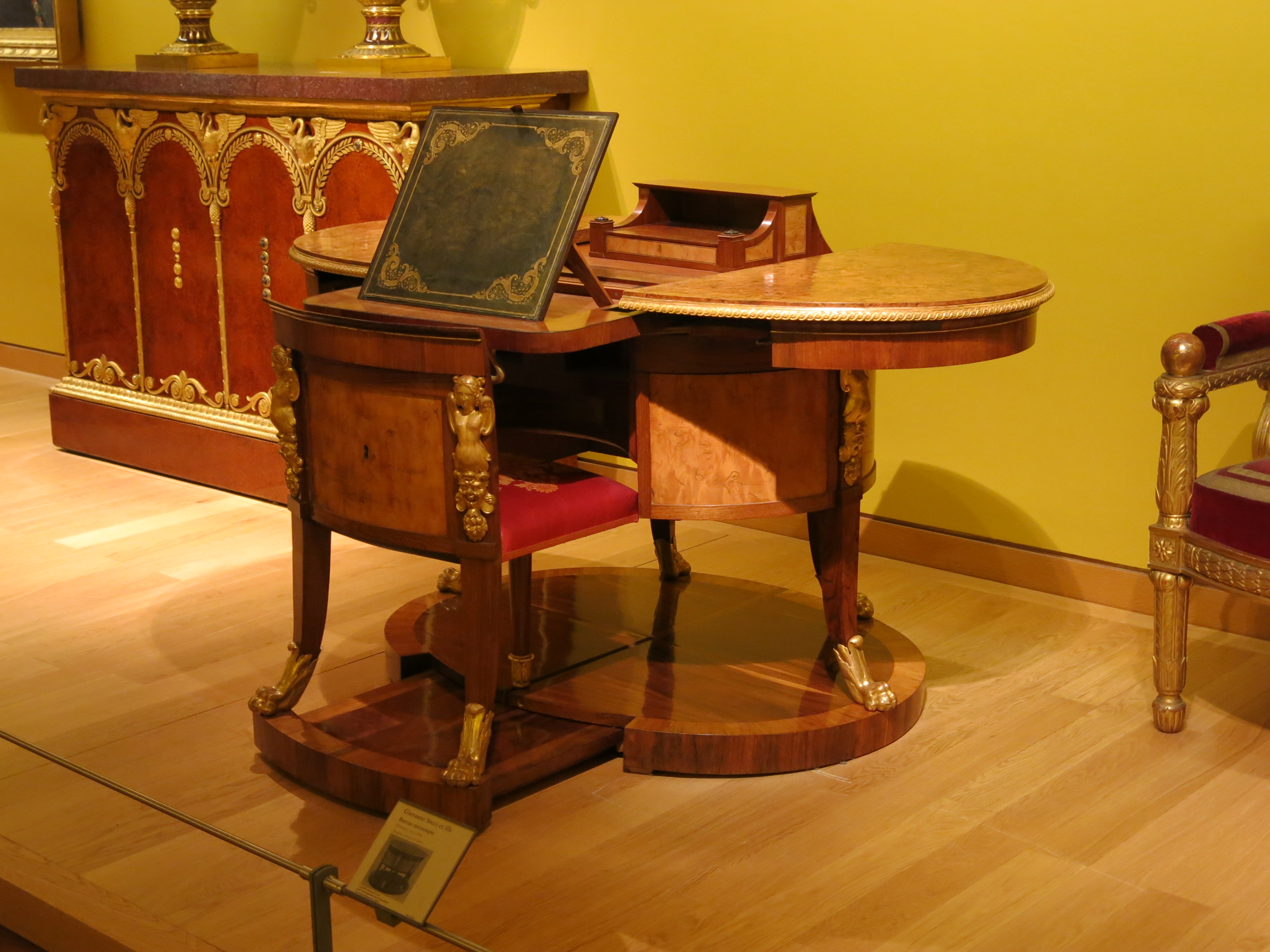
Mechanical desk by Italian furniture maker Giovanni Socci in Louvre museum (Paris, France).

A mechanical desk is usually an antique desk type which was produced during the 18th or the 19th century. At one extreme there are desks furnished with a multitude of panels that swing out while stacks of small drawers pop up when a user lowers or extracts the main writing surface or desktop from a closed position, thanks to some well placed levers and gears. At the other extreme are mechanically simple desks like the Wooton desk whose two panels open up separately by hand and whose desktop is also opened in a separate manual operation, without exploiting any gears or levers. The term is used quite loosely.

There was an explosion of mechanical desk designs in the second part of the 18th century. This came at the same time as a renewed interest in smaller domestic furniture in the homes of the rich, and the general introduction in their homes of all kinds of new mechanical devices such as small clocks and wood turning tools. These devices are described in the Encyclopédie of 1772. The devices and the interest in them were a result of the technological ferment which arose in the United Kingdom during its Industrial Revolution, and gradually spread to Europe.

The mechanical desk fad gradually died at the beginning of the 19th century. By the middle of the 19th century, desk mechanisms were mostly simple affairs meant to extract or retract sliders or supports from a secretary desk, to give but one example. Sit-stand desks, however, became popular again in the 21st century.

== See also ==
- List of desk forms and types.
