= Secretary desk =

Base of drawers topped by a hinged desktop surface topped by a bookcase

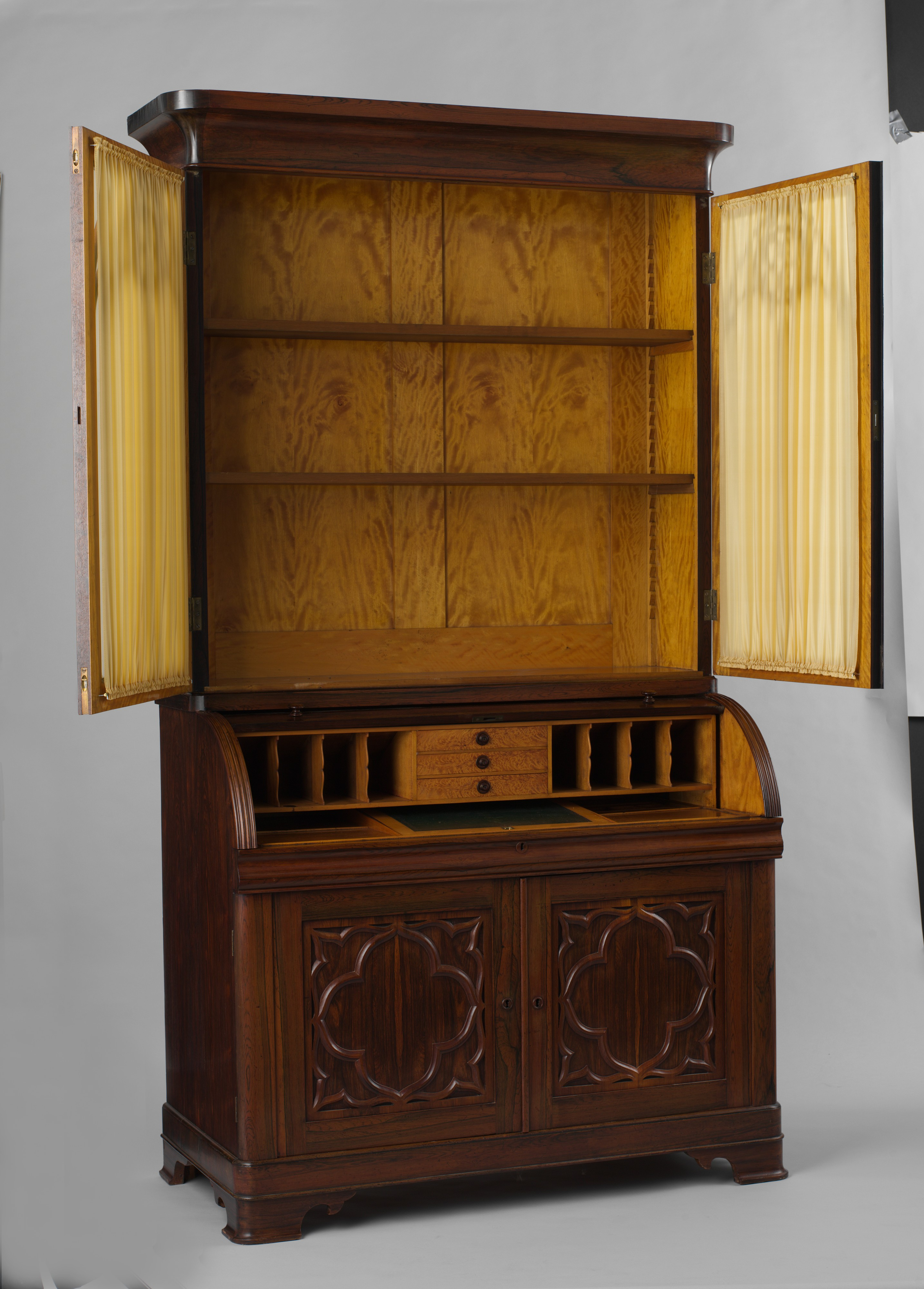
Wooden secretary desk, American, 1836–50

A secretary desk, also known as an escritoire, consists of a base with wide drawers supporting a desk equipped with a hinged writing surface. Above this surface, there is typically a bookcase, which is often enclosed by a pair of glass doors. This piece of furniture is generally a single, tall, and substantial unit.

== History ==
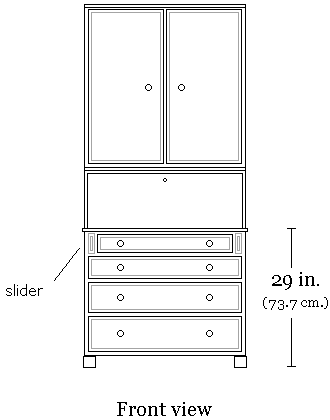
Secretary desk

Like the slant-top desk, the main work surface is a hinged piece of wood that is flat when open and oblique when raised to enclose secondary work surfaces such as small shelves, small drawers and nooks stacked in front of the user. Thus, like the Wooton desk, the fall-front desk and others with a hinged desktop, and unlike closable desks with an unmovable desktop like the rolltop desk or the cylinder desk, all documents and various items must be removed from the work surface before closing up.

When closed, the secretary's desk looks like a cross between a commode-dresser, a slant-top desk and a bookcase. The secretary is one of the most common antique desk forms and has been endlessly reproduced and copied for home use in the last hundred years. Among home desk forms, it is the tallest, biggest and heaviest, excluding wall units and modular desks, which typically can be disassembled for moving, or some of the biggest of the armoire desks, which are usually delivered unassembled.

The desk described here is most correctly termed a secretary and bookcase. There is no unanimity on this term, even among specialists. In Europe the same piece of furniture has been called bureau and bookcase and then desk and bookcase. Also, the general public usually calls this kind of desk a secretary, or secrétaire. In a taxonomic sense one could sometimes say that all desks which have the capacity to close off the working surface are secretaries, while all others are simply desks, but such a division would be too broad to be useful. To add to the confusion, certain forms of the secretary desk are called escritoire, usually when the bookcase section is covered with glazed panels instead of wooden doors, but the term escritoire is also sometimes used to define a very portable writing slope, which is it at the other extreme in terms of bulk and weight.

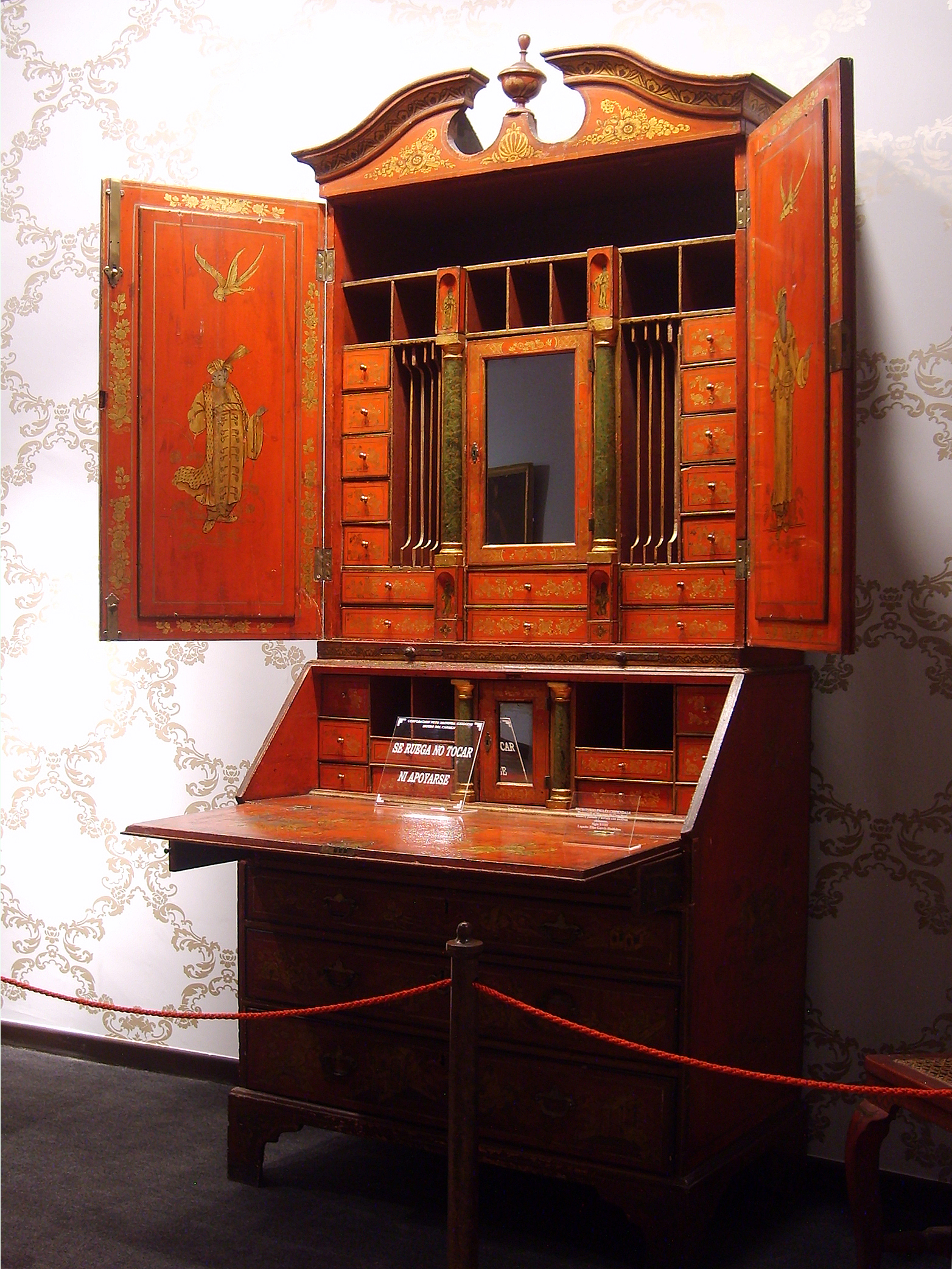
Chippendale desk

When a secretary desk is cut in half vertically, so to speak, to provide a secretary desk half as wide as usual on one side and a glassed door cabinet on the other, this big piece of furniture is called a side-by-side secretary. The term is also applied sometimes to very big pieces of furniture made up of three elements, one of them being a half-wide secretary desk.

On most antique secretaries and also on most reproductions the user has to pull out two small wooden planks called sliders (sometimes "lopers") in order to support the desktop, before actually turning the desktop from its closed, angled, position to its normal horizontal working position. However, in quite a few of the antique versions a system of internal gears or levers connected both to the sliders and the hinged desktop automatically pushed the sliders out at the same time as the user pulled on the closed desktop to put it in its horizontal position. When the user closed it afterwards, the sliders would then retract automatically. In such a case, the secretary is also known as a mechanical desk like many other desk forms which have some sort of mechanism pushing out elements of the desk and then pulling them back in automatically.

A secretary desk is, despite its name, generally not used by a person with the title of secretary, since this kind of desk is an antique form which is now extremely rare in the modern office, where a secretary (frequently called an administrative assistant) normally works. Similar desks may be found in homes across Europe and North America used in backyards and patios to support modern remote work outdoors where weather permits.

== See also ==
- List of desk forms and types
- Davenport desk
