= Fall-front desk =

The fall-front desk is a desk with a main working surface that folds up to cover small shelves or drawers stacked in front of the user. As with its cousin the secretary desk, all working papers, documents and other items have to be stored before the desk is closed.

Unlike the secretary desk, the fall-front desk's desktop panel is perfectly vertical when in its closed position. Often, there are no additional shelves or drawers above the section that is enclosed by the desktop. Thus, the fall-front desk is identical in shape to a Bargueño desk, which would have been placed on a stand of drawers, or more precisely to the form known as desk on a chest or as "chest-on chest".

The fall-front desk is also called a drop-front desk, and sometimes also a drop-lid desk. Scrutoire and scriptoire are ancient variations. The "secrétaire à abattant" is a nearly identical form, but usually in a French style such as Louis XV, Art Deco, etc. In the early 19th century, Shaker communities produced a tall and plain variation that is often known as a "cupboard desk".

== See also ==
- List of desk forms and types
