= Writing table =

Furniture design for writing

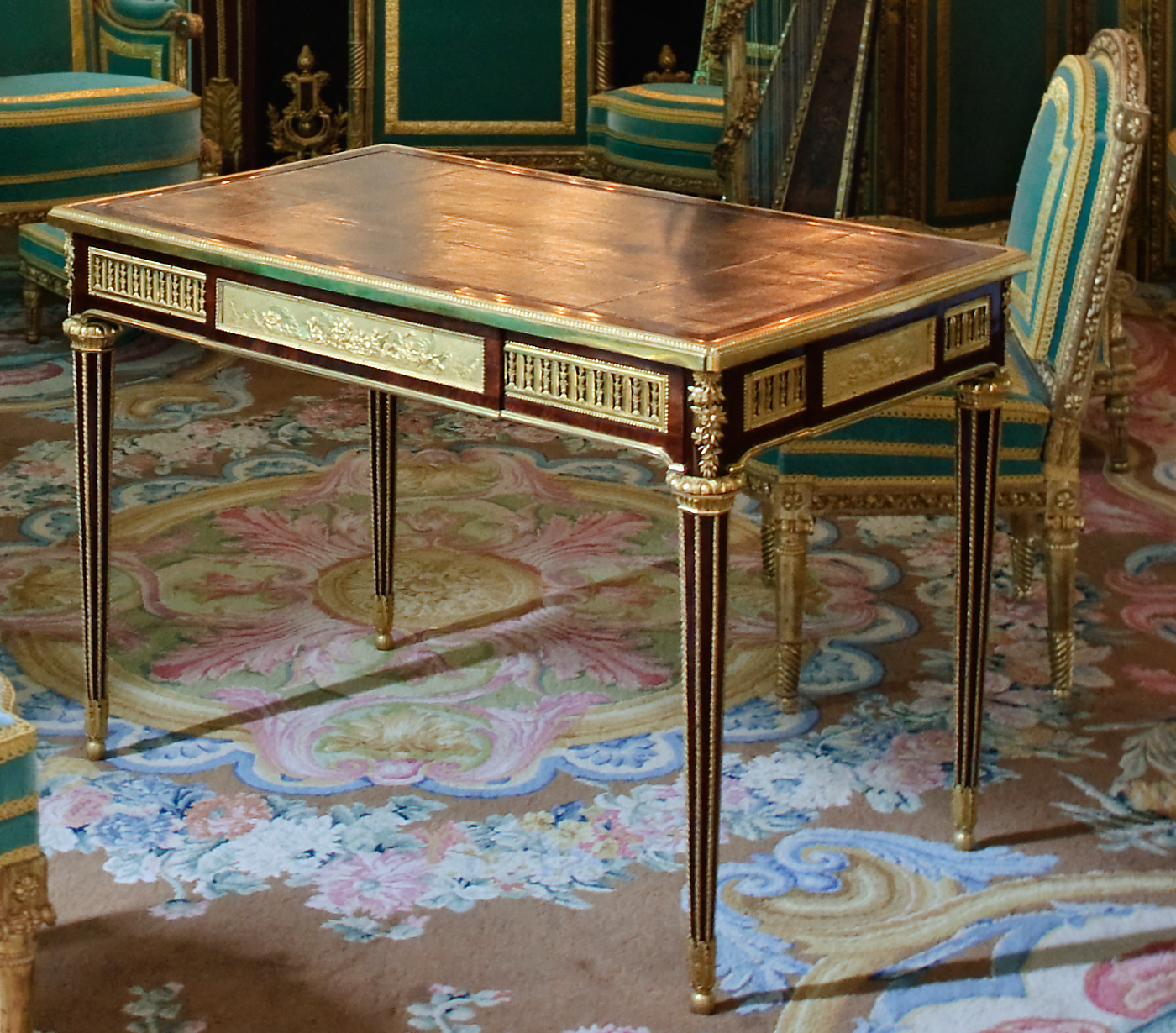
Writing table of Marie-Antoinette by Riesener (1783), Petit appartement de la reine, Palace of Versailles.

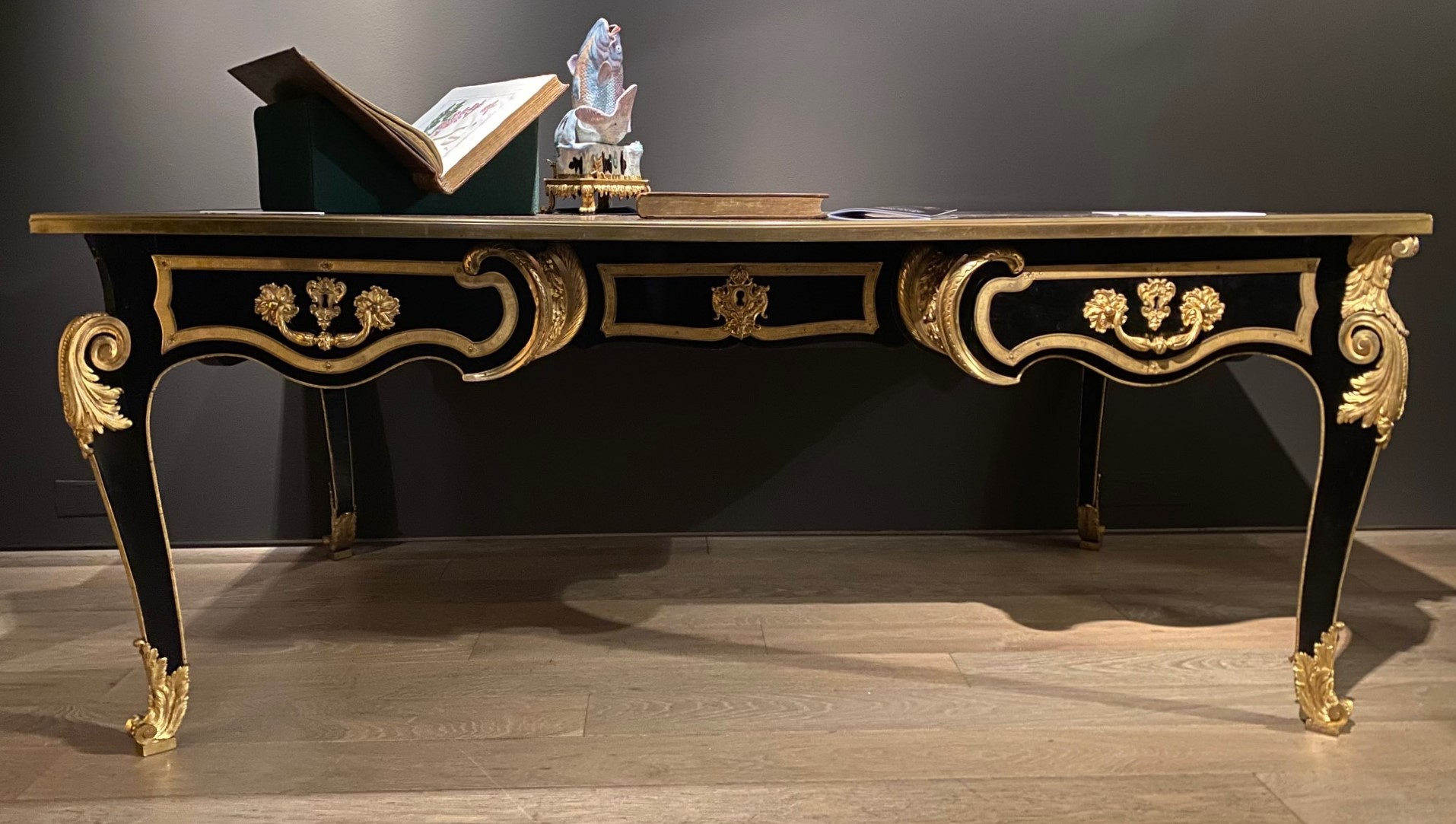
The Baron de Besenval's bureau plat from around 1720 and remodelled by the ebeniste E. J. Cuvellier around 1765 at Christie's in Paris during the sales exhibition in 2025 entitled: "Les Passions du Baron de Besenval – A salon reimagined", featuring works of art from the baron's former collection at the Hôtel de Besenval.

A writing table (French bureau plat) has a series of drawers directly under the surface of the table, to contain writing implements, so that it may serve as a desk. Antique versions have the usual divisions for the inkwell, the blotter and the sand or powder tray in one of the drawers, and a surface covered with leather or some other material less hostile to the quill or the fountain pen than simple hard wood.

In form, a writing table is a pedestal desk without the pedestals, having legs instead to hold it up. This is why such tables are sometimes called leg desks.

The writing table is often called a "bureau plat" when it is done in a French style such as Louis XVI, Art Nouveau, etc. When a writing table is supported by two legs instead of four, it is usually called a trestle desk.

The writing table is also sometimes called a library table, because it was often placed in a home library. This was the room in a house where a gentleman would keep literature and also do his business transactions. The library often housed, in addition, a round desk called a rent table and sometimes a drawing table. The term library table is sometimes applied indiscriminately to a wide variety of desk forms, in addition to being used for writing tables.

Some writing tables have additional drawers built above the surface. In this case they are often called bureau à gradin instead of writing table, unless they have a more specific form, such as that of a Carlton House desk.

A reading and writing table with an easel or double easel for books that was adjustable on a ratchet and a drawer fitted for writing implements was a mid-18th century English invention that lasted as long as the habit endured of reading while standing.

The writing tables are good for maintaining posture and help readers or writers to work longer, nowadays writing tables evolved into desk with desktop systems and other smart devices according to one's need.

== See also ==
- List of desk forms and types
- Stipo a bambocci
