= Resolute =

Resolute may refer to:

== Geography ==
- Resolute, Nunavut, Canada, a hamlet
- Resolute Bay, Nunavut
- Resolute Mountain, Alberta, Canada

== Military operations ==
- Operation Resolute, the Australian Defence Force contribution to patrolling Australia's Exclusive Economic Zone
- Operation Resolute (Balkans), the British portion of the NATO-led peacekeeping force in Bosnia and Herzegovina

== Ships ==
- HMS Resolute, various Royal Navy ships and other vessels
- USS Resolute, various US Navy ships, other vessels and a floating drydock
- USCGC Resolute (WMEC-620), a United States Coast Guard cutter
- USRC Resolute (1867), a revenue cutter of the United States Revenue Cutter Service in commission from 1867 to 1872
- CSS Resolute, a Confederate States Navy tugboat during the American Civil War
- HMCS Resolute, a Royal Canadian Navy minesweeper launched in 1953
- RCGS Resolute, an Antarctic and Arctic cruise ship
- Resolute (yacht), a contender in the 1920 America's Cup
- Resolute (schooner), sunk by a German U-boat in 1942

== Other uses ==
- Resolute Forest Products, a Canadian pulp and paper manufacturer
- Resolute Mining, an Australian mining company
- Resolute, a commercial L class blimp
- Esbern Snare (1127–1204), Danish royal chancellor and Crusader also known as Esburn the Resolute
- Selim I (1470–1520), ruler of the Ottoman Empire also known as Selim the Resolute
- G.I. Joe: Resolute, a 2009 American animated television series
- Resolute, a fictional spaceship in the Exofleet of Exosquad

== See also ==
- Scalar resolute or scalar projection
- Vector resolute or vector projection
- Resolute desk, a desk in the White House Oval Office
- Azzam (2013 yacht) (English: Resolute), a superyacht launched in 2013
- Resolutes (disambiguation)
