= Resolute desk =

Desk in the Oval Office

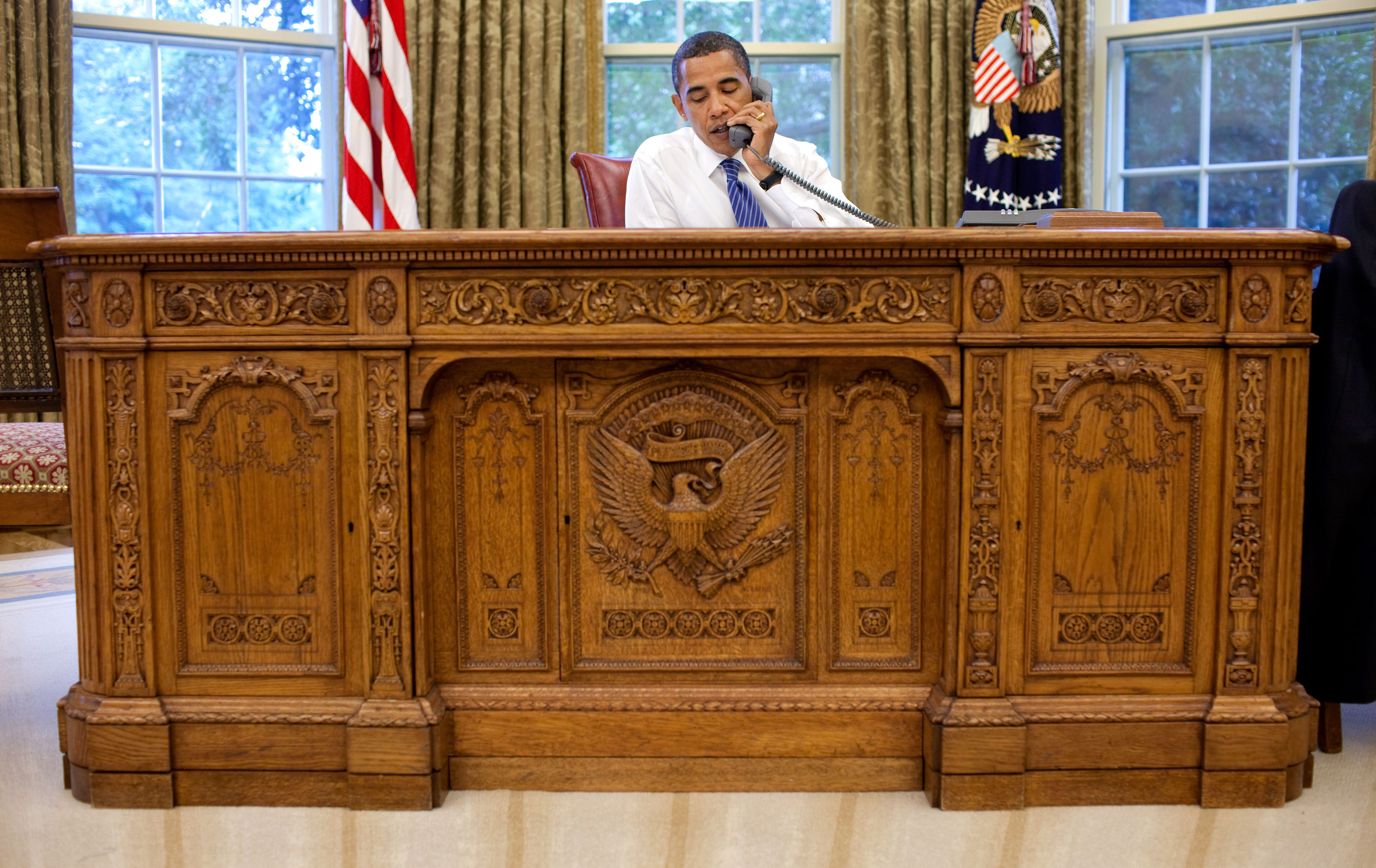
- President Barack Obama sitting at the Resolute desk in 2009
- Designer: William Evenden (probably from a design by Morant, Boyd, & Blanford); Kneehole panel designed by Lorenzo Winslow built by Rudolph Bauss
- Date: 1880
- Materials: Oak timbers of HMS Resolute
- Style / tradition: Partners desk
- Height: 32.5 in (83 cm)
- Width: 72 in (180 cm)
- Depth: 48 in (120 cm)

The Resolute desk, also known as the Hayes desk, is a nineteenth-century partners desk used by several presidents of the United States in the White House as the Oval Office desk, including the five most recent presidents. The desk was a gift from Queen Victoria to President Rutherford B. Hayes in 1880 and was built from the oak timbers of the British Arctic exploration ship HMS Resolute. The 1,300-pound (590-kilogram) desk was created by William Evenden, a skilled joiner at Chatham Dockyard in Kent, probably from a design by Morant, Boyd & Blanford. The desk has been modified twice, with a kneehole panel added in 1945 and a 2-inch-tall (5 cm) plinth added to the desk in 1961.

HMS Resolute was abandoned in the Arctic in 1854 while searching for Sir John Franklin and his lost expedition. The ship was found in 1855 by George Henry, an American whaling ship, repaired, and returned to the United Kingdom in 1856 as a gesture of goodwill from the United States. The ship was decommissioned in 1879, was broken up, and had three desks constructed from its timbers. Queen Victoria sent one of these desks to American President Rutherford B. Hayes. The Resolute desk was received at the White House on November 23, 1880, and it was used in the President's Office and President's Study until the White House Reconstruction from 1948 to 1952. After the reconstruction, it was placed in the Broadcast Room, where Dwight D. Eisenhower used it during radio and television broadcasts. Jacqueline Kennedy rediscovered the desk and had it brought to the Oval Office in 1961. The desk was removed from the White House after the assassination of John F. Kennedy, and went on a traveling exhibition with artifacts of the John F. Kennedy Presidential Library in Boston, Massachusetts. Jimmy Carter brought the desk back to the White House in 1977, where it has been used since.

Many replicas have been made of the Resolute desk. The first was commissioned in 1978 for a permanent display at the John F. Kennedy Library, and since then five other presidential libraries and many museums, libraries, tourist attractions, and private homes and offices have acquired copies of the desk.

== Design and markings ==
H.M.S. 'Resolute', forming part of the expedition sent in search of Sir John Franklin in 1852, was abandoned in Latitude 74º 41' N. Longitude 101º 22' W. on 15th May 1854. She was discovered and extricated in September 1855, in Latitude 67º N. by Captain Buddington of the United States Whaler 'George Henry'. The ship was purchased, fitted out and sent to England, as a gift to Her Majesty Queen Victoria by the President and People of the United States, as a token of goodwill & friendship. This table was made from her timbers when she was broken up, and is presented by the Queen of Great Britain & Ireland, to the President of the United States, as a memorial of the courtesy and loving kindness which dictated the offer of the gift of the 'Resolute'.

— brass plaque affixed to the desk

The Resolute desk is built from oak timbers that were once part of the ship HMS Resolute. The double pedestal, partners desk is 32.5 in (83 cm) high with a workspace measuring 72 in (180 cm) wide and 48 in (120 cm) deep. It weighs 1,300 pounds (590 kg). The desk was created in 1880 by William Evenden, a skilled joiner at Chatham Dockyard in Kent, probably from a design by Morant, Boyd, & Blanford. The desk is decorated with carved moldings and carved floral swag designs. There are sets of drawers behind the cabinet doors on each side of the desk pedestals, and the desktop is covered with red leather. Built at the same time as the Grinnell desk, the two desks together cost 380 pounds (equivalent to £39,523 in 2025).

A plaque, mounted on the front center drawer, explains the history of the Resolute and the meaning behind the desk. This plaque was originally on the back of the desk but from Ronald Reagan's presidency onwards it has been photographed as being on the front. The underside of all the exterior drawer fronts are stamped "MORANT BOYD & BLANFORD / 91 NEW BOND STREET" and the lock plates are stamped "BY ROYAL / LETTERS PATENT / FOUR LEVERS / SAFETY LOCK / COMYN CHINC & Co."

=== Modifications ===
Modifications of the Resolute desk

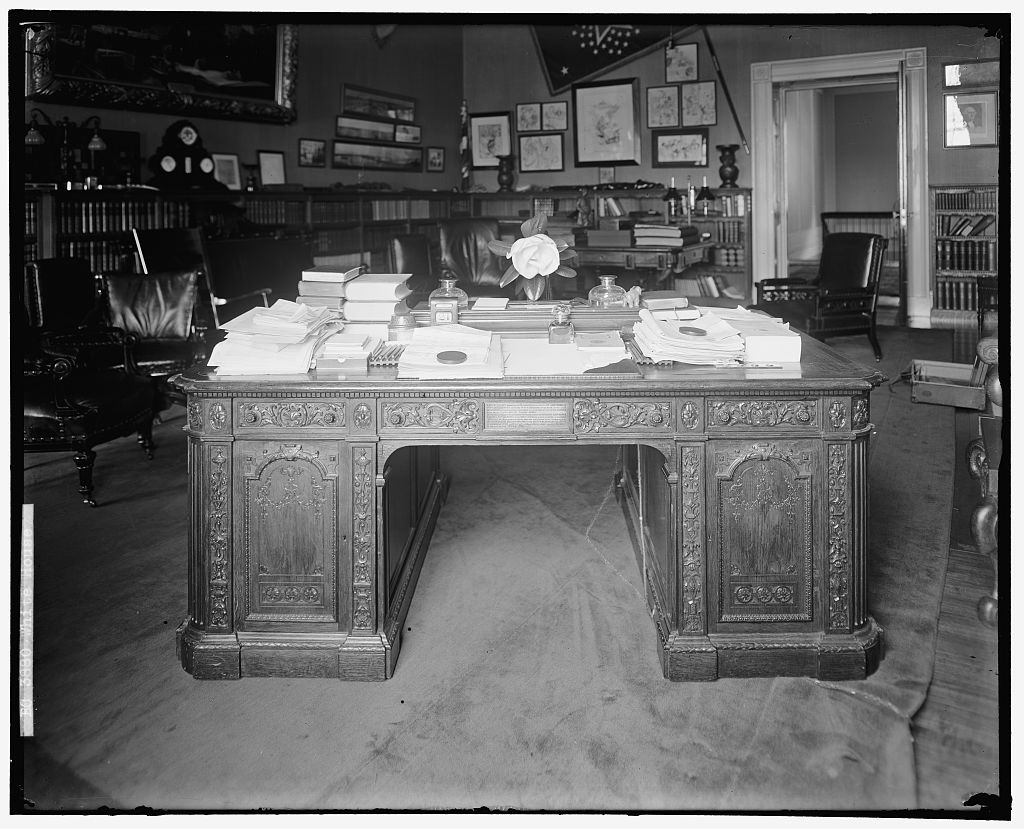
The Resolute desk before any modifications were made in William Howard Taft's Presidential Study

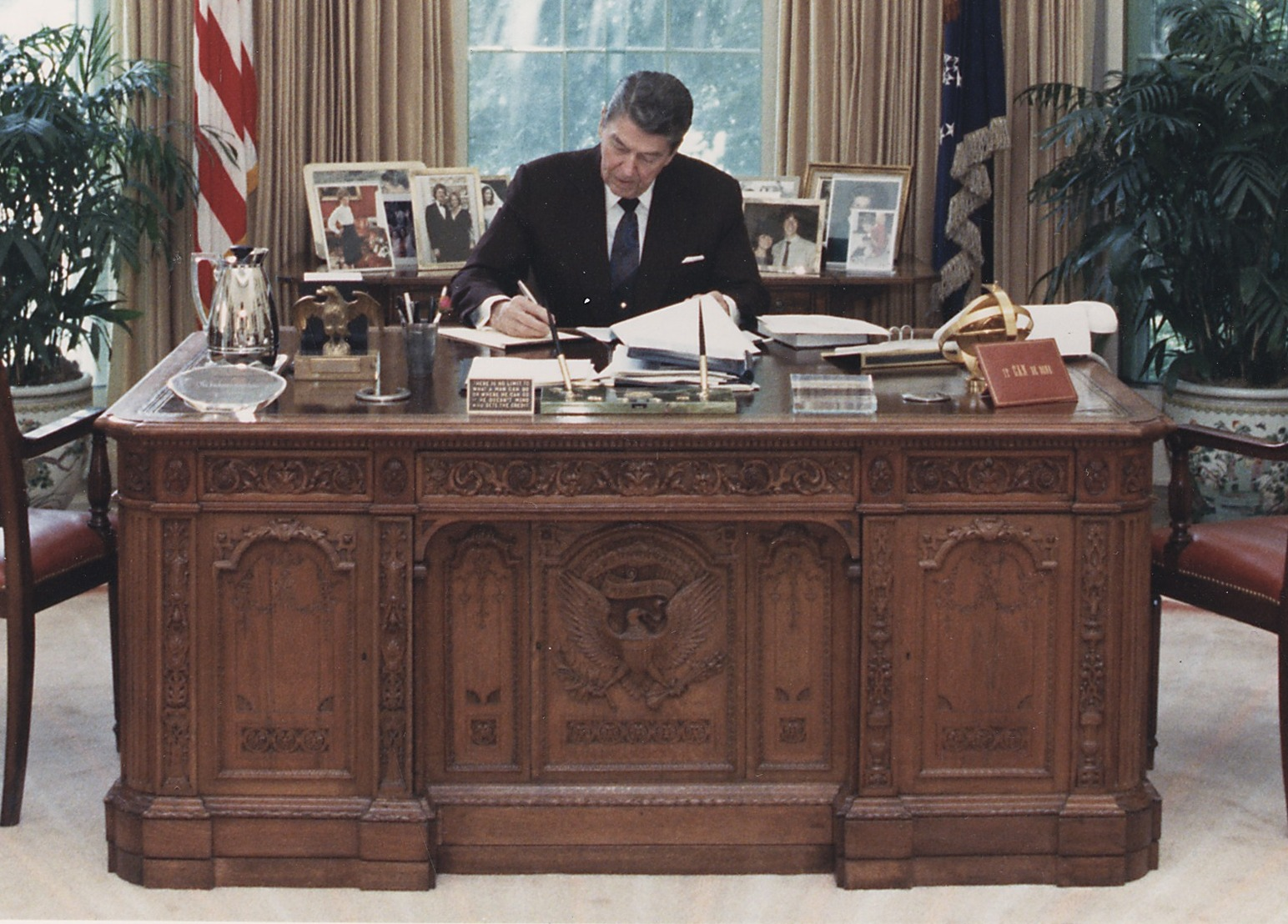
President Ronald Reagan working at the Resolute desk with both the kneehole panel and plinth additions visible

Two significant modifications have been made to the Resolute desk since it was delivered to the White House. A panel was installed in the kneehole of the desk in 1945 and a plinth, or base, was added to raise the height of the desk in 1961.

The panel was designed by White House architect Lorenzo Winslow and constructed and carved out of hard oak in 1945 by Rudolph Bauss, a National Park Service employed model-maker and designer. The kneehole panel is hinged, opens up, and features a carving of the Presidential seal. The carved seal depicts the eagle's head facing left, turned towards the arrows in the eagle's talon. Later in 1945, the design of the presidential seal was changed by Harry S. Truman to have the eagle turned towards the olive branch in the right talon instead. This was to have the bird turn away from the symbol of war and towards the symbol of peace. The carving on the desk was not changed, so the carving on the desk no longer matches the official design.

In 1961, during the John F. Kennedy administration, a two-inch-tall (5 cm) plinth was installed under the desk to elevate the kneehole and allow the president to sit more comfortably. The plinth fits the shape of the desk, sitting flush with the molding above it. The original plinth was replaced in 1986 during Ronald Reagan's administration. According to the White House Historical Association multiple bases, or plinths, have been added and removed over the years. The desk was refinished in 2025.

== History ==
=== HMS Resolute ===
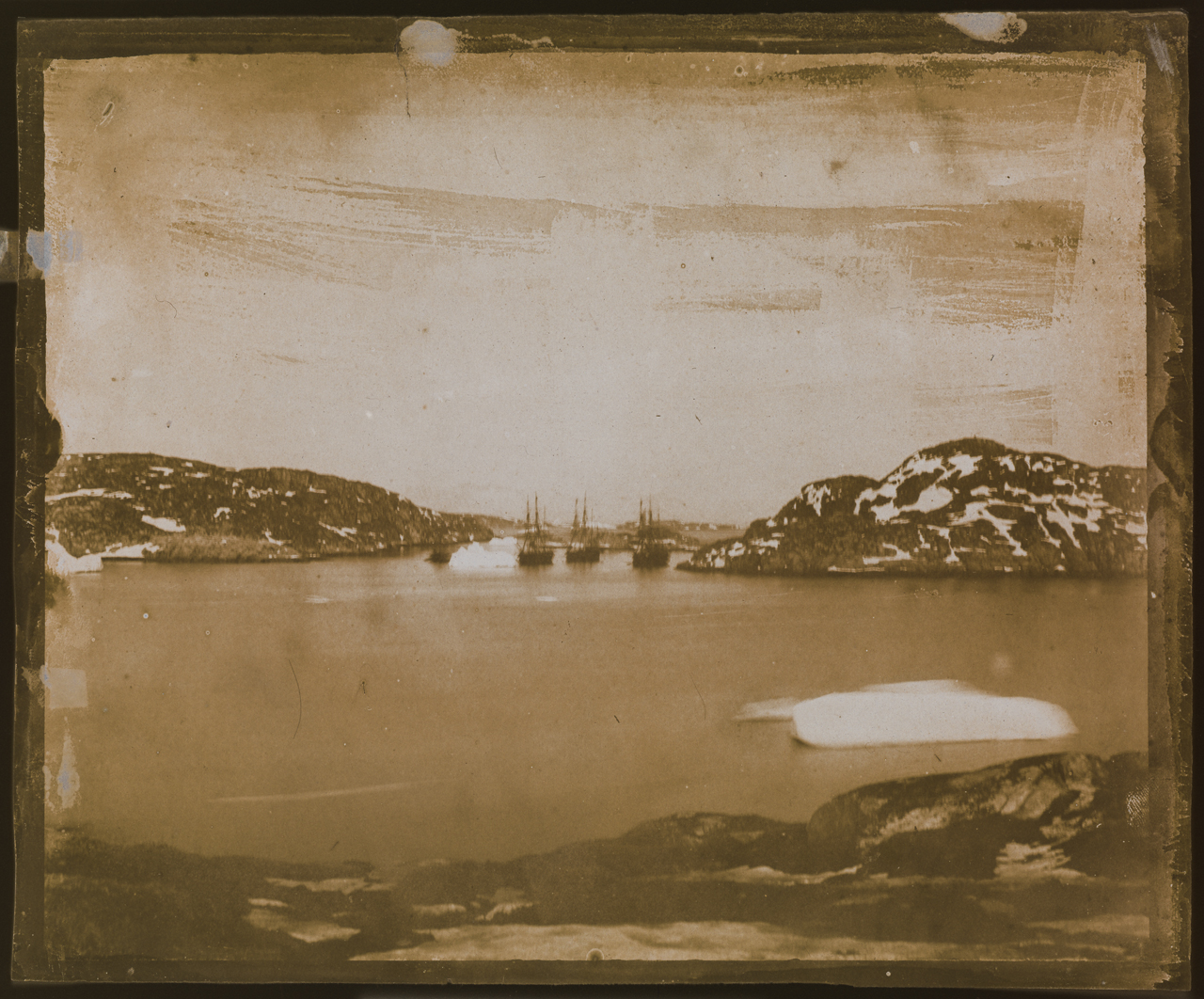
A view of Resolute, Intrepid, Pioneer, and Assistance, before they left Beechey Island

In May 1845 Sir John Franklin, a British explorer, launched an expedition to find the Northwest Passage. Using two of the Royal Navy's best ships, HMS Erebus and HMS Terror, stocked with enough provisions to last three years, he charted a course through Baffin Bay, located between Baffin Island and the west coast of Greenland. The expedition and all 129 crew members vanished.

The fate of the ships was frequently brought up in British press and grew into a cause célèbre. At least one folk ballad was written about the expedition and Charles Dickens published an article in Household Words downplaying scandalous, unfounded reports that were circulating claiming the crew had resorted to cannibalism. Due to the public desire to know what happened, a five-ship squadron under Sir Edward Belcher set out from Britain in 1852 to search for the missing ships and explorer. HMS Resolute, captained by Sir Henry Kellett, was joined by HMS Intrepid, HMS Pioneer, HMS Assistance, and HMS North Star, all under Belcher's command, on the expedition. The North Star stayed at a supply base on Beechey Island, while the other four ships split up to search for Franklin. The Resolute was constructed expressly as an Arctic vessel with a bow covered in iron to cut through ice. It nevertheless became trapped in ice in April 1854, and the other three ships became stuck soon after. Belcher decided to abandon the four ships, and on May 15, 1854, Resolute was abandoned in Tariyunnuaq (what was then called Melville Sound). The ships' crews marched across the ice to the North Star back at Beechey Island and later sailed back to England on it and two auxiliary vessels. Belcher was court-martialed for the loss of his ships and the danger he put his crew through during the expedition. He never again received a naval command.

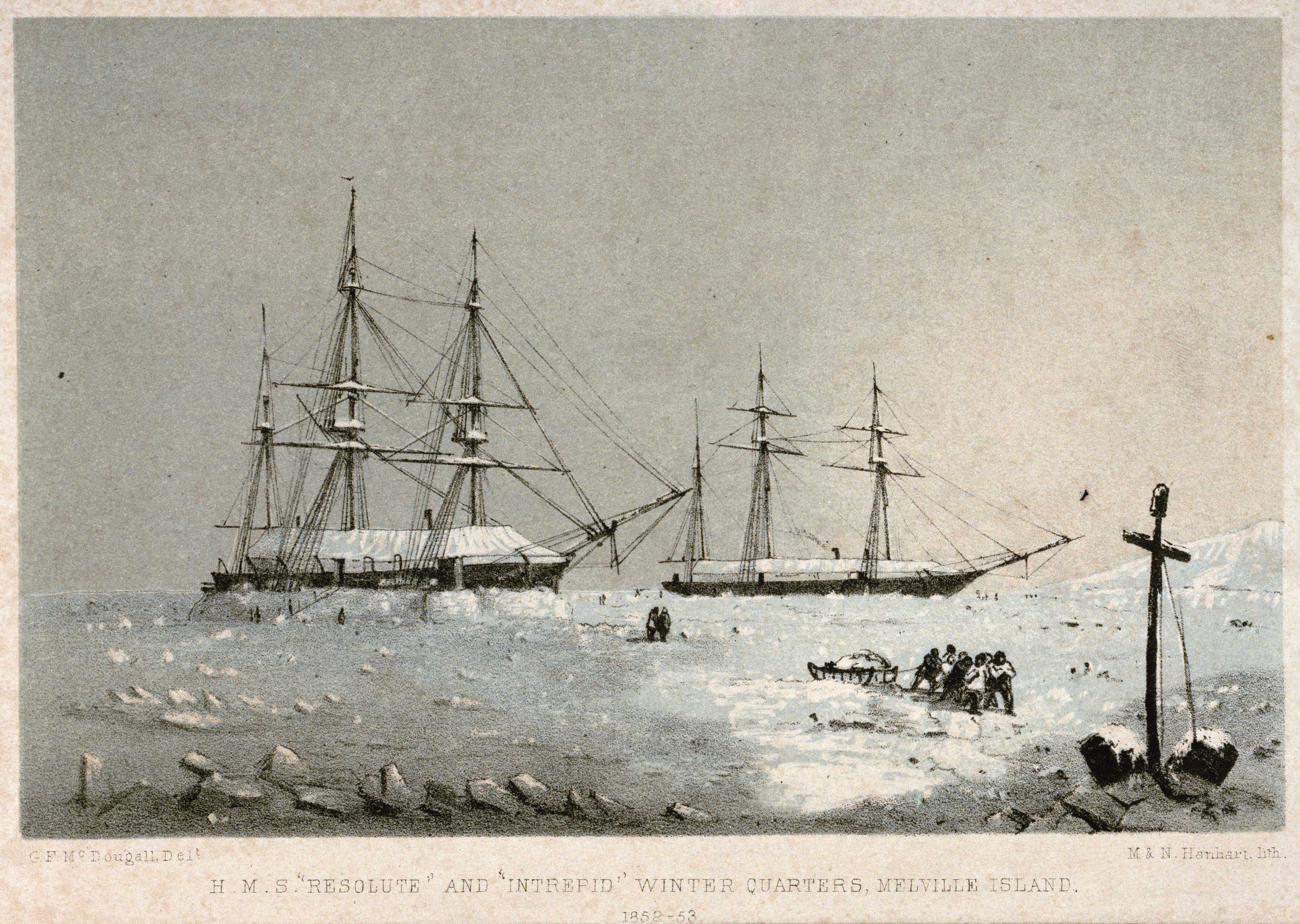
A print after a drawing by George Frederick McDougall, drawn while he was a Master on the Resolute, showing the Resolute and Intrepid in their 1852–53 winter quarters at Melville Island

When the ice thawed in the spring, the unmanned Resolute began drifting south, traveling more than 1,000 miles (1,600 kilometres) and roughly 7 degrees latitude, where it was spotted in September 1855 in Davis Strait, off the shores of Baffin Island, by the crew of George Henry, an American whaling ship captained by James Buddington. The whalers tried to signal the ship, and after it failed to respond four sailors boarded it. They found the ship uninhabited but still stocked. The ship was listing badly to its port side and missing its topmast. It took several weeks to pump out the water from the ship and get it back to an even keel, but Buddington knew the ship's story and knew he could likely sell it for a large sum when he returned it to dock. Buddington claimed the right to salvage for HMS Resolute, and sailed it to New London, Connecticut, arriving on Christmas Eve 1855.

This all happened during an especially tense time in United Kingdom–United States relations. Then-President Franklin Pierce was prepared to go to war with Britain for what would be a third time. In his third annual message, in 1855, Pierce discussed disputes over fishing rights and the border between British Columbia and Washington Territory as well as Britain's territorial claims in South America, which the United States claimed violated the Clayton–Bulwer Treaty. Regarding the disagreement about Britain's foothold in South America, Britain's then First Lord of the Admiralty stated that "We are fast drifting into war with the United States."

Wealthy American philanthropist Henry Grinnell, who had financed an earlier expedition to find Franklin's lost ships to no avail, suggested to the US government that the Resolute should be refit and sent back to England as a token of goodwill. As a way to help calm tensions between the two countries, a bill was introduced to Congress on June 24, 1856, to authorize the purchase and restoration of the Resolute. The United States Government bought the ship from Buddington for $40,000 (equivalent to $1,380,000 in 2025) with plans to return it to the United Kingdom as a gift to Queen Victoria.

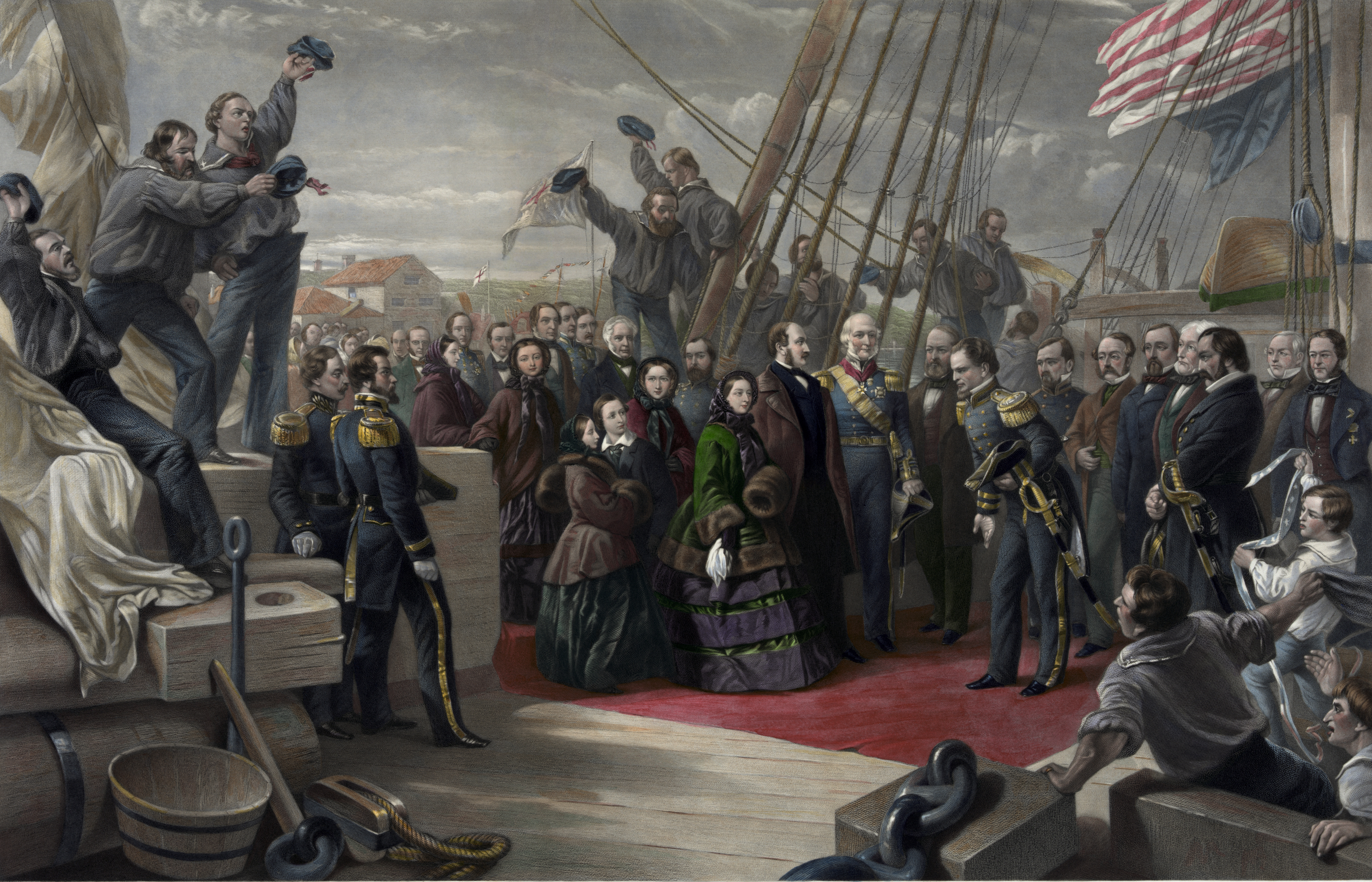
An engraving after the artwork of William Simpson, of Queen Victoria visiting HMS Resolute on December 16, 1856

On September 12, 1856, the Resolute was towed to the Brooklyn Navy Yard, where it underwent a complete refit, repaint, and restock. The ship set sail on November 13, 1856, out of New York Harbor and arrived in Portsmouth on December 12 of the same year, captained by Henry Hartstene. Hartstene, a member of the United States Navy during the American Civil War, had previously taken part in the Wilkes Expedition to study the Pacific Northwest, and captained a voyage to the Arctic to successfully save Dr. Elisha Kent Kane who had gone missing on his own search for Franklin. After arriving in England the Resolute was later brought to Cowes Harbour on the Isle of Wight where Queen Victoria and Prince Albert boarded the ship and accepted it on behalf of Great Britain. Hartstene, as part of comments about the ship in a speech, expressed his hope "that long after every timber in her sturdy frame shall have perished, the remembrance of the old Resolute will be cherished."

The Resolute continued serving in the Royal Navy for twenty-three years as a supply vessel, but never again left British waters. The ship was decommissioned in 1879 and subsequently broken up in Chatham Dockyard in Chatham, England, in 1880.

=== Design and construction ===
Unbuilt designs for furniture made from the timbers of the Resolute

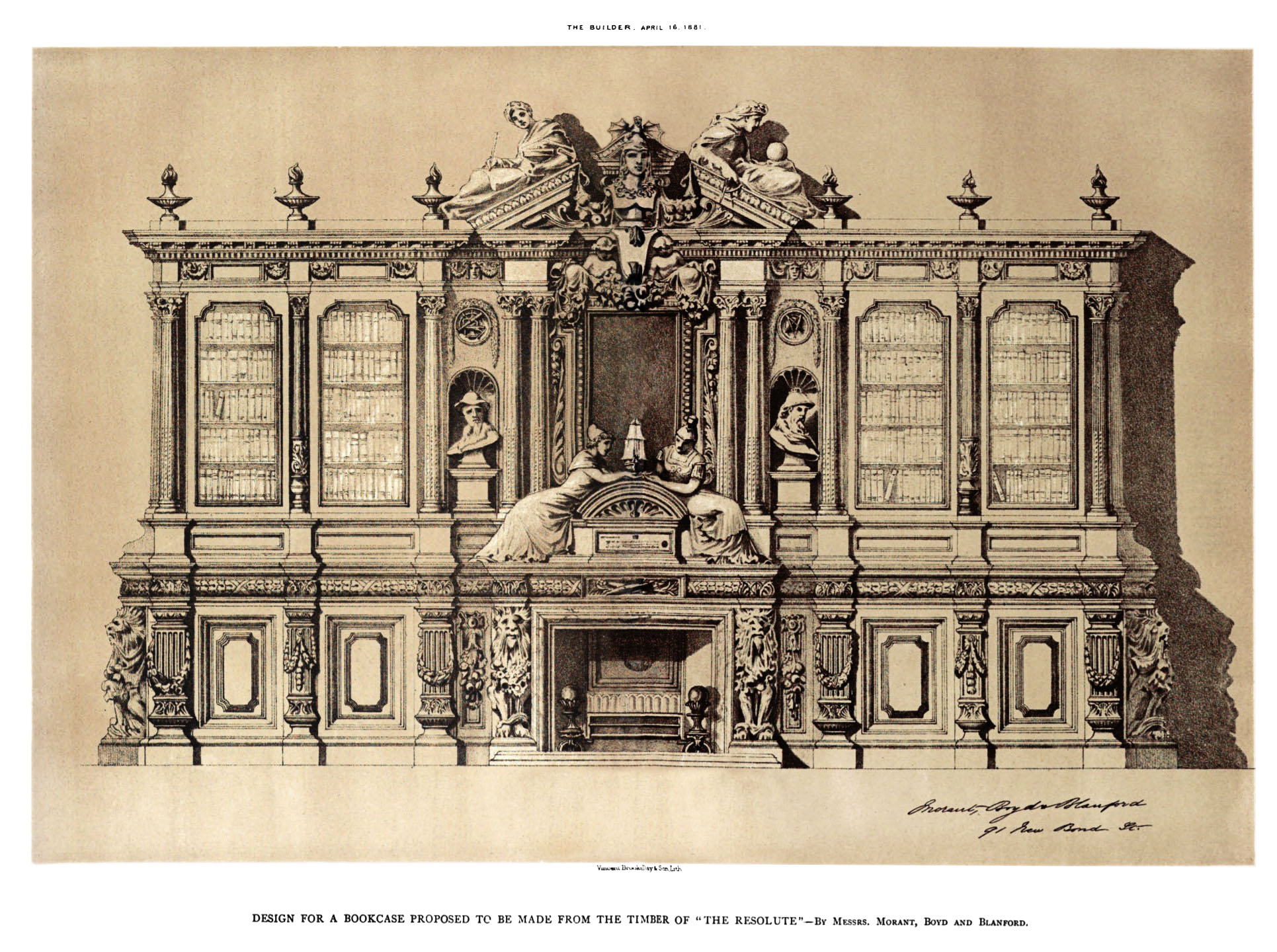
An early plan for a "Design for a bookcase proposed to be made from the timber of "The Resolute" – By Messrs. Morant, Boyd, and Blanford" as found in the April 16, 1881, edition of The Builder, drawn by A.F. Brophy

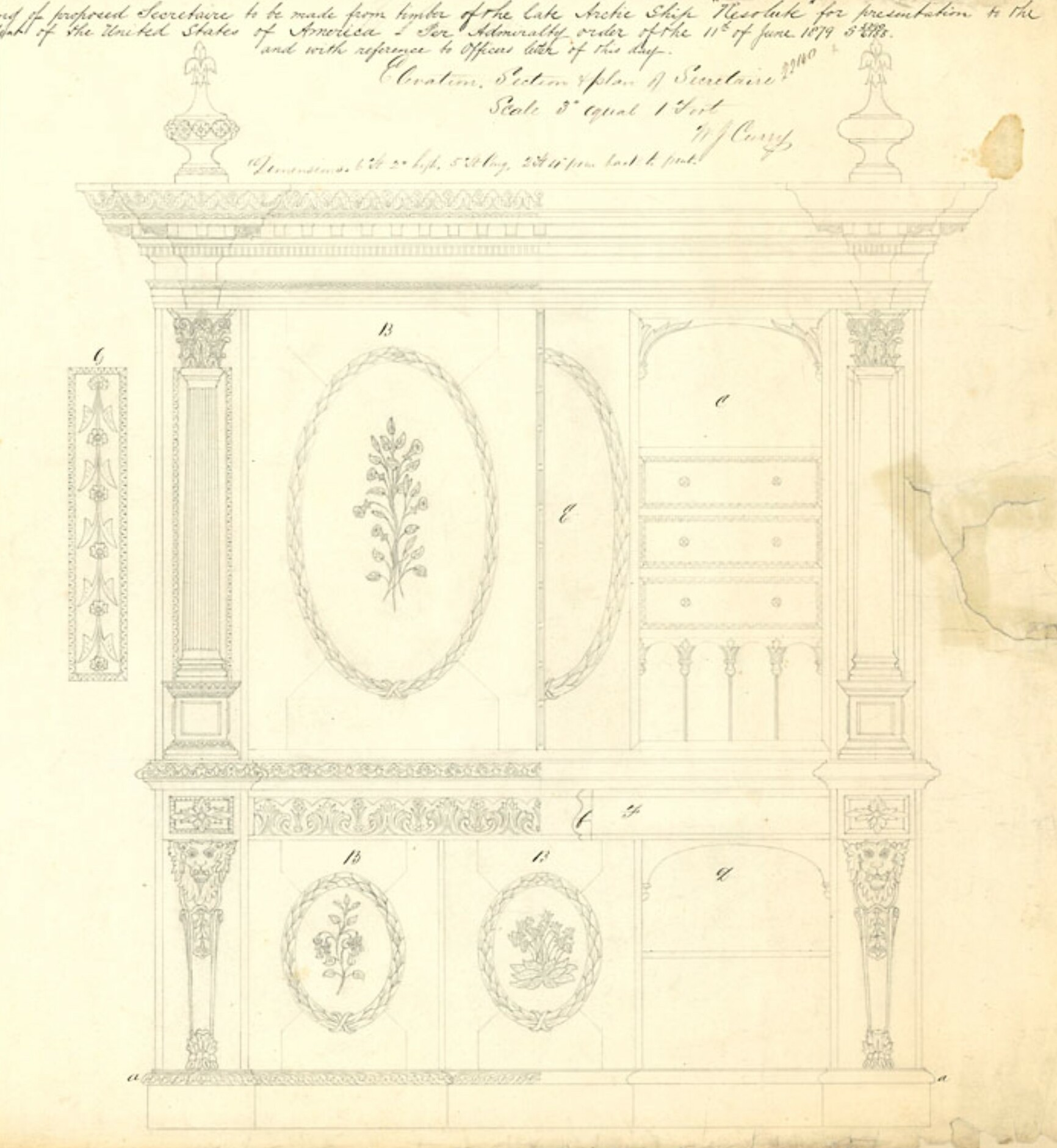
Part of a drawing for a "proposed secretaire to be made from timbers of the late Arctic ship "Resolute"" dated September 9, 1879

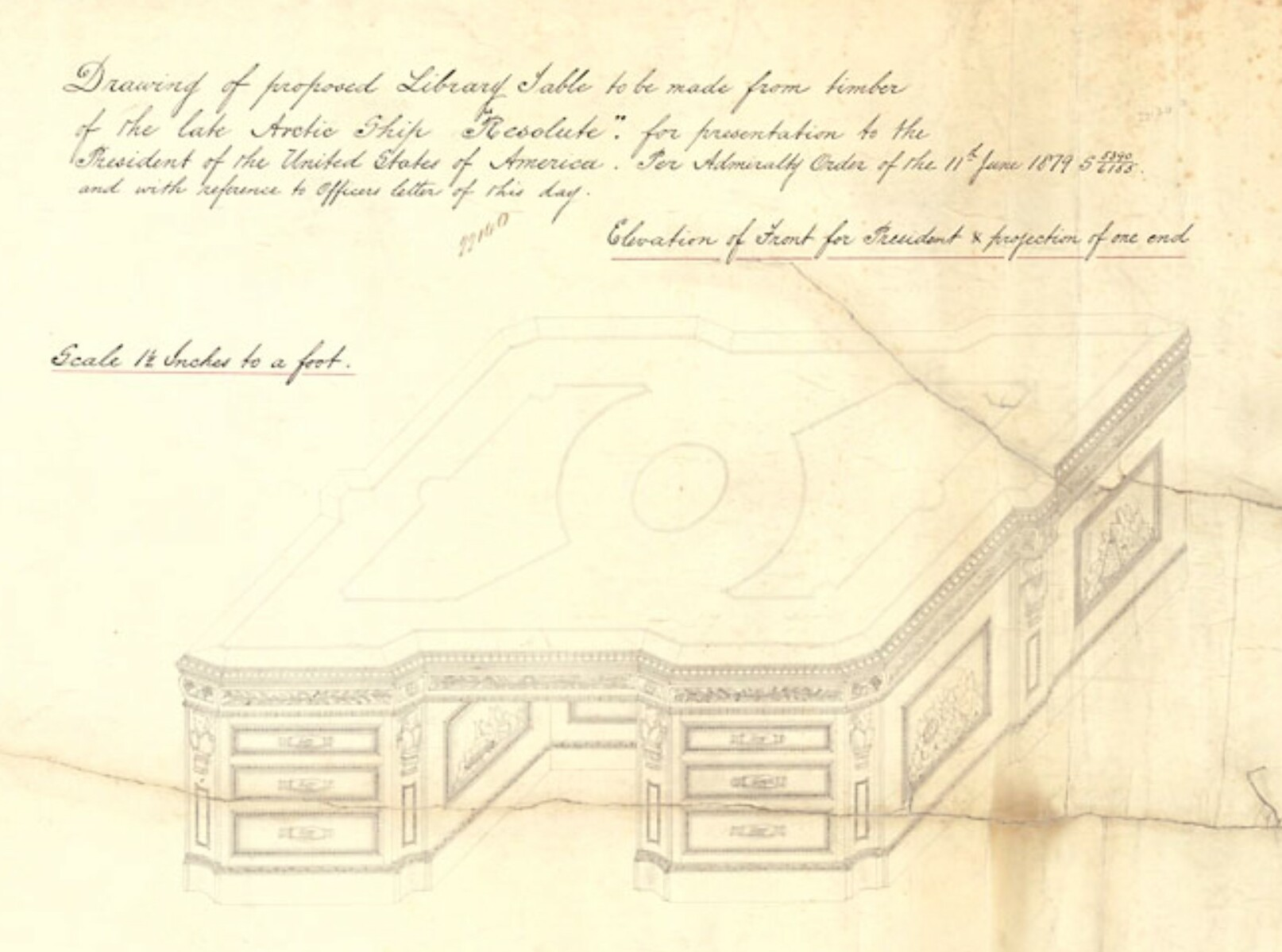
Part of a drawing plan for a "proposed Library Table to be made from timbers of the late Arctic ship "Resolute"" dated September 9, 1879

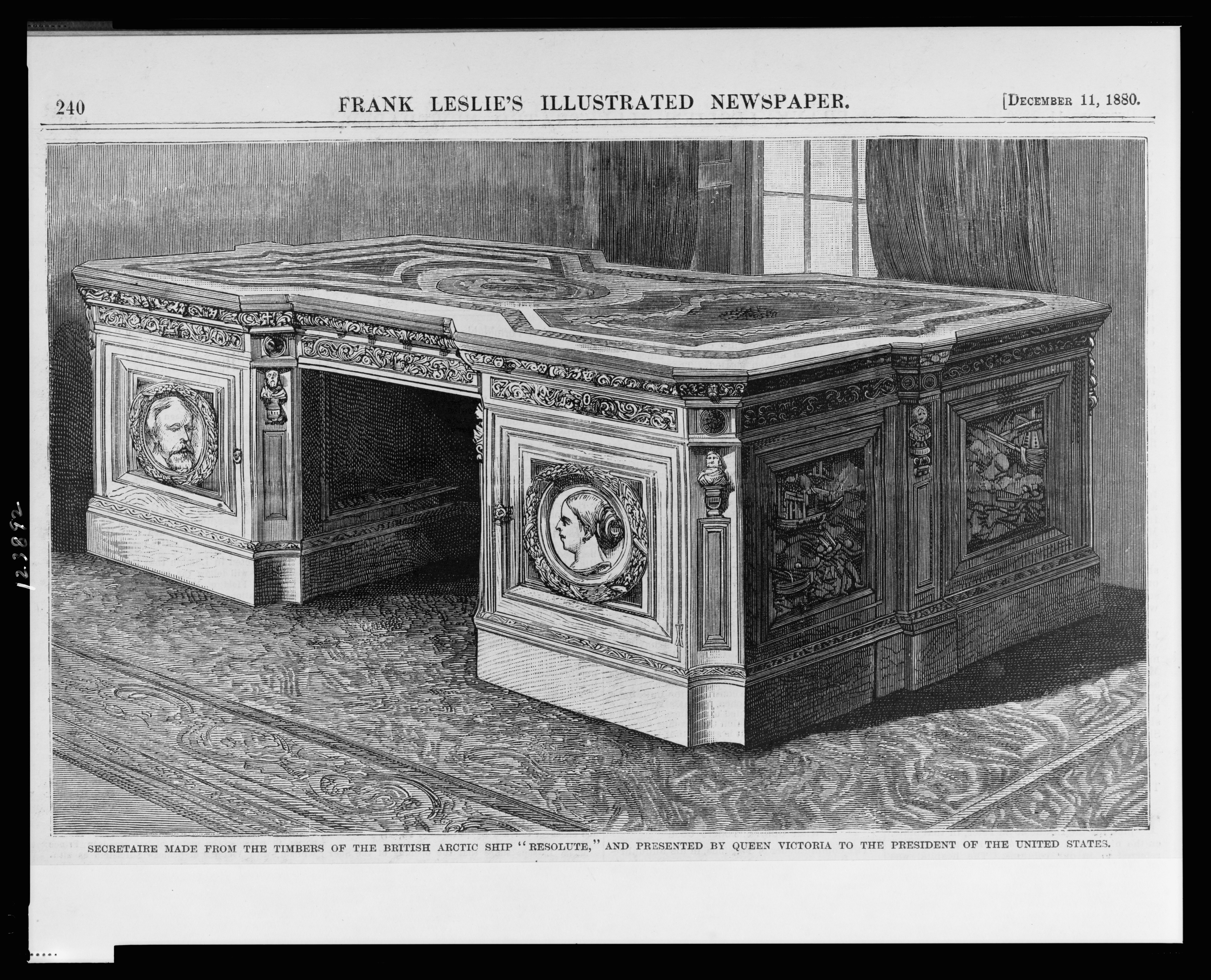
The mislabeled design for "Secretaire made from the timbers of the British Arctic ship Resolute" from the December 11, 1880 Frank Leslie's Illustrated Newspaper

On June 11, 1879, the British Admiralty launched a competition to design a piece of furniture made from the timbers of the Resolute which Queen Victoria could gift to the American president. A January 3, 1880, article in The Builder described the desired furniture piece as "a magnificent article of furniture, combining writing table, bookshelves &c., ... made out of the ship's timber and sent as a present to the President of the United States." Six firms, including Morant, Boyd & Blanford and Jackson & Graham, submitted competing designs. Morant, Boyd, & Blanford was chosen to complete the furniture piece. According to Kelly's London Post Office Directory of 1871, Morant, Boyd, & Blanford were "interior decorators, painters, upholsterers, estate and housing managers, carvers, gilders and cabinet makers." The company was founded by George Morant and had supplied work for Thomas Lawrence, Robert Peel, and the Dukes of Sussex, Cambridge, and Sutherland. The company also exhibited at the Great Exhibition, the Exhibition of the Industry of All Nations, and the 1862 International Exhibition. Queen Victoria granted the company a Royal Warrant of Appointment in 1840. For the rest of the century, they were considered one of the preeminent cabinet makers in England.

Morant, Boyd & Blanford had sent in multiple design drawings for the competition late in 1879 for various furniture pieces that could be constructed, including a large combination bookcase and chimneypiece. This design was created to symbolize the circumstances surrounding the gift of the Resolute back to England. A bust of Minerva, the first shipwright in Roman lore, sat in the central broken pediment, and reclining figures representing navigation and astronomy flanked the bust. Niches on either side of the central columns held busts of Edward Belcher and Henry Grinnell, and directly about the fireplace a carving of a personified "America" hands "Britannia" the ship Resolute. The National Maritime Museum holds the plans for two other proposed designs; a secretaire and a library table. This library table design was not built, but a December 11, 1880, issue of Frank Leslie's Illustrated Newspaper incorrectly presented an engraving of this design as the actual desk presented to the president. The engraving was made from drawings by H. Biscoe for an earlier Scientific American article about the proposed design. This early, ornate design for the desk was created on September 9, 1879. It included portraits of both Queen Victoria and then-President Rutherford B. Hayes. These portraits were paired with side panels displaying scenes of the Arctic and British and American flags along with other highly ornate details and a Moroccan leather top.

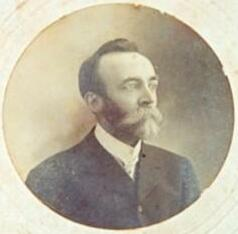
Photograph of William Evenden, from 1882, taken by "John Hawke, Plymouth, By Royal Appointment"

Queen Victoria ordered that three desks be made from the timbers of Resolute. The one that is now known as the Resolute desk was announced as "recently manufactured" on November 18, 1880. Built under orders of the Lords Commissioners of the Treasury, William Evenden was tasked with creating the desk at Chatham Dockyard. Evenden was a skilled joiner working in the dockyard's Joiner's Shop, but very little is known about him. June Drake, Evenden's great-great-granddaughter, wrote in a 2012 letter to the Friends of Medway Archives that he was born in 1828 in Rochester, Kent, and worked as a Freeman of Rochester at Chatham Dockyard. Drake said she believed Evenden to be well educated, as his mother was a schoolmistress and his two brothers had gainful employment; his younger brother was a master shipwright and naval architect in Devonport, Plymouth, while the other became a mining pioneer and Magistrate in Thornborough, Queensland, Australia. Drake said she was unsure why Evenden was chosen to build the Resolute desk, but suggested that his brother in Devonport may have suggested Evenden for the job. There is one known photograph of William Evenden which was taken by Royal Appointment in 1882 by J Hawke in Plymouth. Drake postulates that this image may have been taken while he was visiting his brother. According to Drake, Evenden committed suicide in 1896 after "being distraught at the thought of being unemployed and maybe entering the workhouse." She surmised that is likely the reason there is not much information about him. He was buried at Chatham Cemetery, but his grave can no longer be found.

=== Arrival in America ===
On August 26, 1880, Victor Drummond, the British ambassador to Washington, wrote a letter to William M. Evarts, Secretary of State for the US, informing him of Queen Victoria's upcoming gift of the new writing table as well as its history. The crate containing the desk arrived in New York on November 15, 1880, by steamship and arrived at the White House on November 23. The first note written on the desk was by Hayes on the day the desk arrived at the White House to George Bancroft where he noted, "It gives me great pleasure to say that I do it in the first note written on the desk made from the timbers of the Resolute sent by Queen Victoria for the President." The desk has since been referred to by the name of the ship it was crafted from, the Resolute desk, or by the name of the president that accepted the gift, the Hayes desk. The December 11, 1880, issue of Frank Leslie's Illustrated Newspaper praised the desk's beauty (albeit with the previous design pictured) and declared how it represented a major step forward in United Kingdom–United States relations.

=== Early use as a presidential desk ===
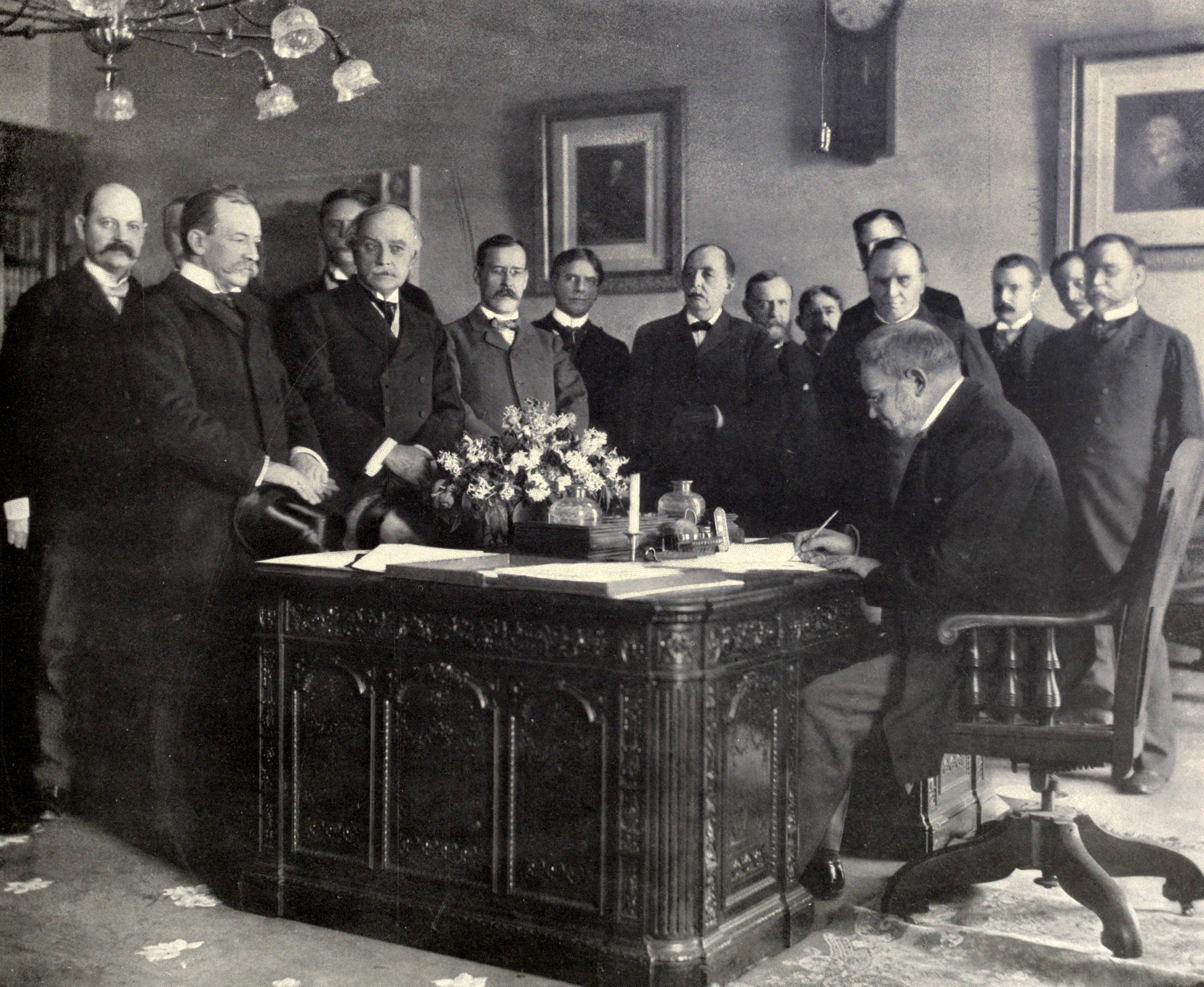
Jules Cambon, signing the Treaty of Paris on behalf of Spain in 1899 at the Resolute desk during William McKinley's presidency. The daily bouquet is visible on the desk.

After receiving the desk, President Hayes placed it in the Green Room, one of the three state parlors on the first floor of the White House. It was on view here as an exhibition for tourists and visitors until Hayes ordered the desk be taken upstairs to his office on the second floor. At this time, the second floor of the White House acted both as the first family's living quarters and as the President's Office. What are now the Lincoln Bedroom, Lincoln Sitting Room, and Treaty Room were the president's main working spaces with the Yellow Oval Room used as the president's library or a family parlor. After the desk was moved to these offices by Hayes in 1880, it traveled from room to room, based on presidents' needs, for the next twenty-two years. Grover Cleveland used it in his office and library in what is now the Yellow Oval Room for both of his non-consecutive terms, William McKinley used the desk often in the Presidential Office and had a bouquet of flowers placed upon it every day, and Theodore Roosevelt used it in the President's Room, today's Lincoln Bedroom.

The desk stayed in the President's Office until the office was moved to the newly built West Wing in 1902, during Theodore Roosevelt's presidency. After the McKim, Mead, & White renovations to the White House, Edith Roosevelt moved the Resolute desk to the former cabinet room, now the Treaty Room, to create a Den, or President's Study, for her husband. Woodrow Wilson also used the Resolute desk in this room. Wilson and his wife called the center drawer on one side of the desk "The Drawer" as it was where important communications and papers were placed if something happened between the closing time the day before and that morning.

=== Franklin D. Roosevelt and the kneehole panel ===
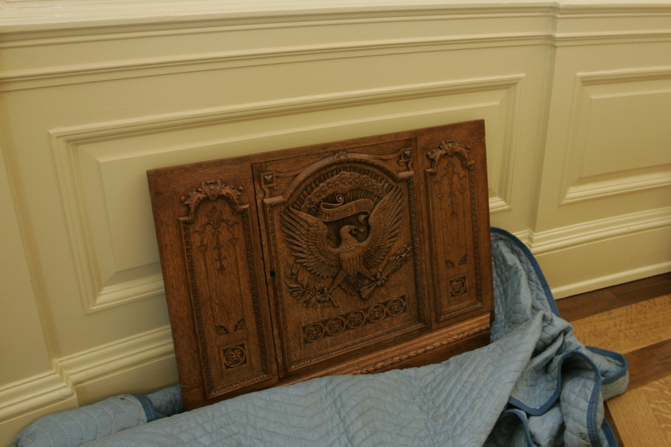
The kneehole panel of the desk during the 2005 renovation of the Oval Office

Franklin D. Roosevelt turned the Yellow Oval Room into his Oval Study, where both he and Harry S. Truman used the Resolute desk. Roosevelt kept the desk covered in personal mementos and, when entertaining visitors, would mix alcoholic drinks on the desk.

While the desk was in use in the Oval Study, President Roosevelt requested that a panel be installed in the rear kneehole, but it was not installed until 1945 after Roosevelt had died. The earliest documented reasoning for the addition of this panel comes from a 1962 phone call readout with Rudolph Bauss, the National Park Service employee who carved and constructed the panel. while referring to Franklin D. Roosevelt, Bauss stated, "The President requested that a panel be placed in the desk for the following reasons: 1.) to hide the iron braces on his legs; 2.) to conceal a safe which the President wished to place just behind the panel." Roosevelt wore leg braces and was in a wheelchair most of the time due to polio.

This statement by Bauss has become the official story for this panel and has been repeated in many official channels and well researched articles and books. Sarah Fling, a historian with the White House Historical Association disagrees with this narrative in her article, "A Resolute Myth: Debunking the Resolute Desk Panel," noting that Roosevelt used this desk in a non-public facing room, he did not have panels installed in other public desks he used, and that the designs by Lorenzo Winslow for the panel are dated June 13, 1945, which is two months after Roosevelt's sudden death. Fling believes Bauss's memory was inaccurate and there is no evidence the decision to add the panel was tied to Roosevelt's disability.

=== White House reconstruction ===
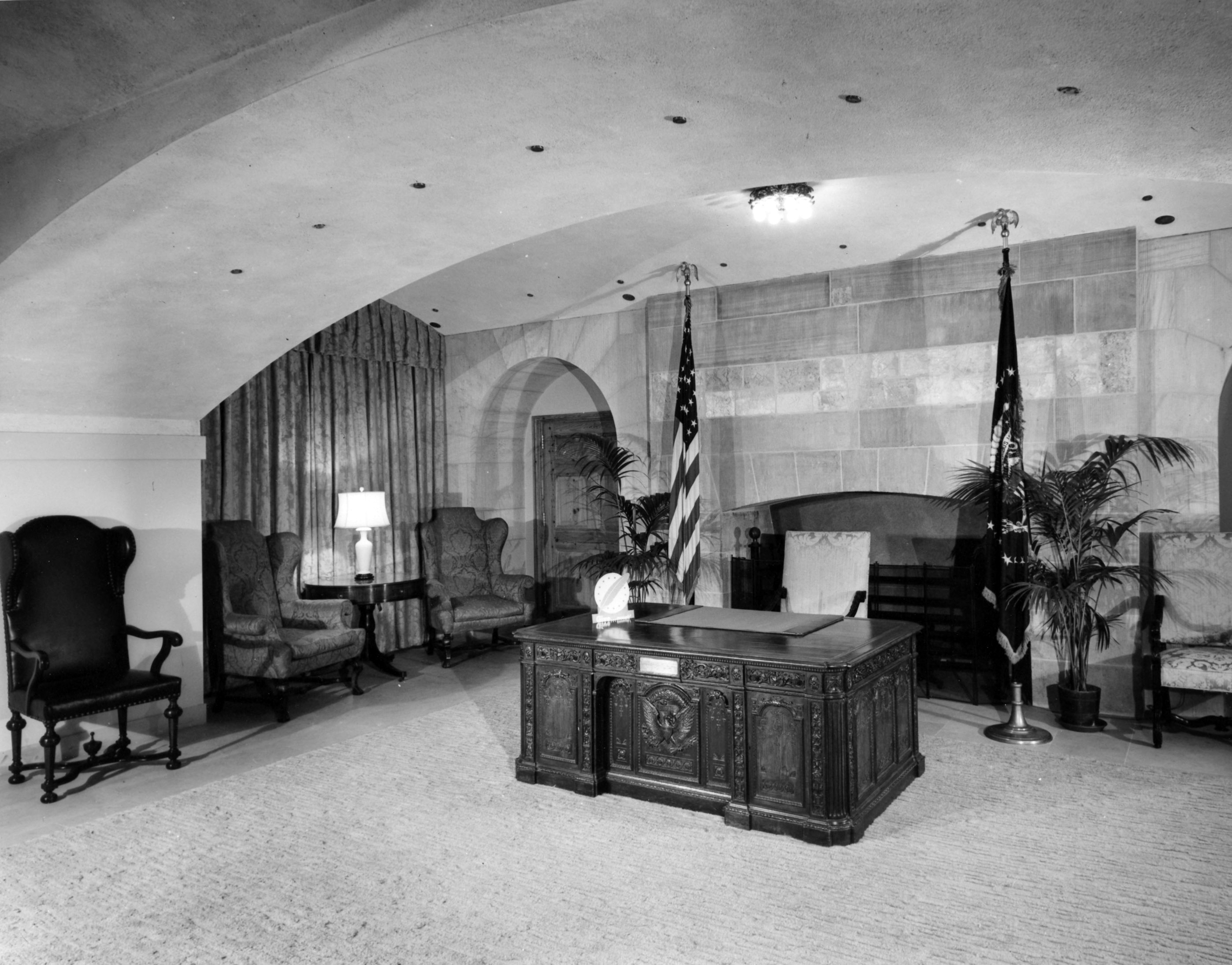
The desk in the Broadcast Room in 1952

The White House saw a major reconstruction under Harry S. Truman between 1948 and 1952 where the entire interior of the building was rebuilt. The president moved his family to Blair House during this reconstruction. The move out began on November 9, when the president left for a trip to Key West, with staff being given only two weeks to completely empty the building of furnishings. Blair House was already furnished but some White House elements were installed in the next door Lee House which was connected to Blair house during this move. The rest of the items had to be stored. The Library of Congress stored some books, the National Gallery of Art housed some of the art, and the Smithsonian Institution stored a few additional pieces. Most objects though were shipped up to New York to be stored in the climate controlled vaults owned by B. Altman and Company. Charles T. Haight, who ran the interior design department at Altman, charged the government only the at-cost rate for storage, $85 a month (equivalent to $5,092 in 2025).

Charles T. Haight was awarded for storing the furnishings at such a low cost by being invited to do the interior design for the newly constructed White House rooms. On June 19, 1951, Haight presented a color drawing of his design for the old kitchen, later known as the Broadcast Room and now the Office of the Curator, to Congress's Commission on Renovation of the Executive Mansion. These plans included heavy traverse draperies in dull gold, a chenille rug, a pine table and cabinet removed from the White House after the 1814 Burning of Washington, black leather sofas and chairs, small tables, two new end tables, two new coffee tables and "The large desk which was originally in the President's Study" per minutes from a meeting of the commission. Here, in the Broadcast Room, the Resolute desk was used during both radio and television broadcasts by Dwight D. Eisenhower.

=== Kennedy administration ===
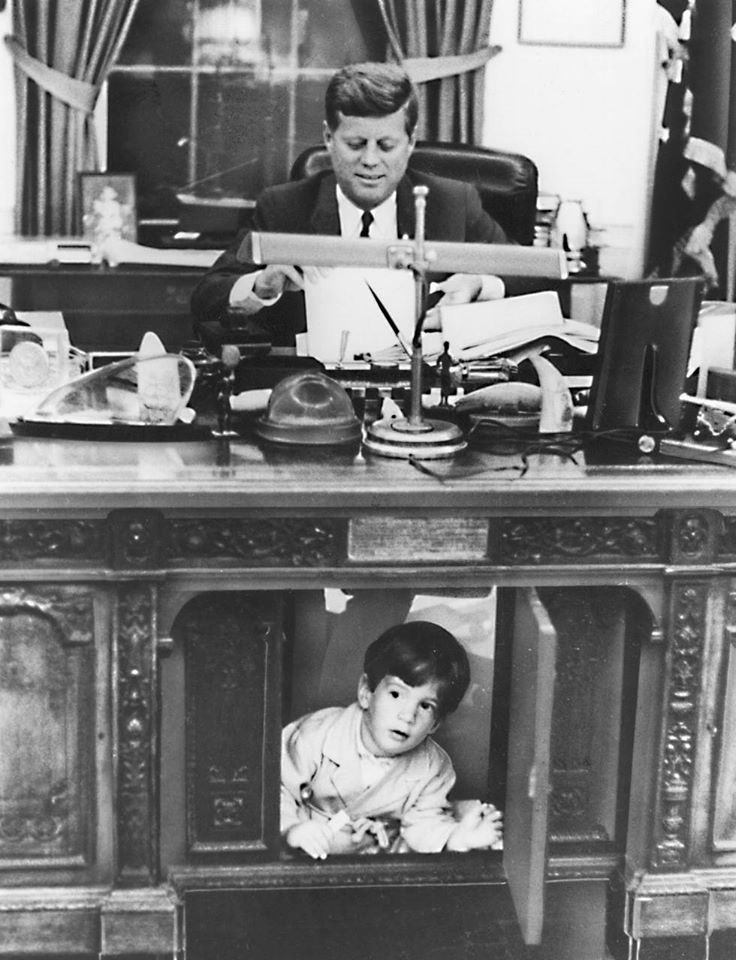
Stanley Tretick's October 2, 1963, photo of John F. Kennedy Jr. playing in the kneehole of the Resolute desk

In 1961 John F. Kennedy was the first president to use the desk in the Oval Office. The Theodore Roosevelt desk was used briefly by Kennedy in the presidential office, but Jacqueline Kennedy had it replaced by the Resolute. She was disappointed by the interior design of the White House when she moved in, stating that it "looked like it's been furnished by discount stores", and called it "that dreary Maison Blanche." Her desire to update the interior, however, was not immediately embraced by politicians. This changed with the forming of the Fine Arts Committee for the White House, later replaced by the Committee for the Preservation of the White House, in February 1961 with a stated goal of finding "authentic furniture of the date of the building of the White House and the raising of funds to purchase this furniture as gifts for the White House." Jacqueline Kennedy worked with the committee, including its chair Henry Francis du Pont, first White House Curator Lorraine Waxman Pearce, and interior designer Sister Parish, to find objects that were suitable for the historic building, and physically searched the White House for valuable items hidden away. She discovered that four Cézanne paintings originally intended for the White House were instead on display in the National Gallery of Art; she found 100-year-old busts in a downstairs men's bathroom; and after moving aside electrical equipment in the Broadcast Room, she uncovered the Resolute desk.

When Jacqueline Kennedy discovered the desk, it was covered and obscured by green baize attached to it with Scotch Tape. The desk was being used to prop up camera equipment when films were shown in the Broadcast Room, and the baize was apparently there to protect it from the equipment. The discovery of the desk was announced in a White House press release titled "Discovery of the Table Desk from H.M.S. Resolute" on February 6, 1961, and led to a front-page article about the desk in the New York Times the next day. The article explained the choice to move the desk to the Oval Office as, "Feeling that the desk, with its connection with the sea, would perfectly complement the naval battle scenes and the model of the Constitution which she already had secured at her husband's suggestion, Mrs. Kennedy has given the desk to the president and it was placed in his office on Saturday, Feb. 4." Kennedy also wanted the ornate desk to be the most visible of the desks used by her husband. President Kennedy was said to be "delighted" by the return of the desk to "a place of honor in the White House." It was moved into the Oval Office and, according to the Smithsonian Institution, the desk "gained national prominence when President Kennedy's son, John, was photographed crawling through its trap door."

Kennedy had a taping system installed in the Oval Office which was designed and installed by Robert Bouck, a Secret Service agent, in July 1962. A microphone was located in the kneehole of the Resolute desk, and a button was installed under the desk for Kennedy to turn it on and off at will. A second microphone was disguised on the coffee table in the same room. Kennedy was the first president to make extensive use of recording as a means to document meetings, selectively recording over 238 hours of conversation between recording systems in both the Oval Office and Cabinet Room. This system was unknown to most of Kennedy's top aides until it was revealed during the Watergate hearings in 1973.

After Kennedy's assassination, Lyndon B. Johnson did not move into the Oval Office for several days, possibly at the request of Robert Kennedy. He finally did begin using the room on November 26, 1963, and had the Resolute desk replaced with the Johnson desk, the desk that he had used throughout his time in the Senate and as vice president.

=== Public display ===
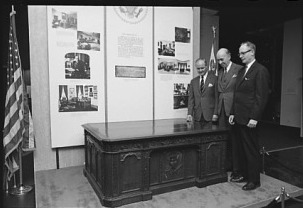
S. Dillon Ripley, Webb C. Hayes (great-grandson of President Hayes), and William Howard Taft III at a reception for the Resolute desk exhibition at the National Museum of History and Technology in 1967

In a 1978 oral history interview with James R. Ketchum, the White House Curator from 1963 to 1970, he claimed that as Johnson was moving into the White House he approached Mrs. Kennedy saying, "Little lady, anything you see in your husband's office, you take. You are welcome to anything." Mrs. Kennedy expressed interest in having the Resolute desk. Under a law passed in 1961, the White House is considered a museum and any donated items are property of the White House but cared for by the Smithsonian Institution when not in use. Ketchum claimed that even though both Johnson and Mrs. Kennedy knew about this law they allowed the desk to be packed up to go on tour to help raise funds for the forthcoming John F. Kennedy Presidential Library and Museum. Ketchum states he required the Kennedy Library to sign a loan agreement so the desk "was still not considered an outright gift or whatever that had passed between Mrs. Kennedy and President Johnson." On February 12, 1964, the Resolute desk was transferred, on loan, to the Smithsonian Institution and went on tour around the country between 1964 and 1965. This 32,000 sq ft (3,000 m^{2}) traveling exhibit visited 27 American cities and 15 European ones including Warsaw and Belgrade, both Communist capital cities. On the American leg of the exhibit, it visited Atlantic City during the 1964 Democratic National Convention. When it traveled to Boston, 45,000 visitors were estimated to have viewed the desk in a single day.

Ketchum describes that when the desk returned from this world tour it was considerably damaged "mainly because of the way the exhibit was handled and the shipping problems which they obviously encountered." After going back and forth about ownership of the desk Ketchum was able to get it back into the custody of the White House for repairs. According to Ketchum, the cabinetmaker that carved the panel requested by FDR (this was Rudolph Bauss, but he is not named in the interview) had just retired and was dying of cancer. Ketchum got him out of retirement to complete the repairs to the desk. Shortly after the repairs were complete he died from his illness. Ketchum believes that the length of time needed to complete the repairs reduced the controversy over who owned the desk, with the Smithsonian receiving the repaired desk and putting it on view beginning in 1966. The desk was originally displayed as an exhibit in its own right at the National Museum of History and Technology, now the National Museum of American History, with the independent exhibit opening on November 16, 1967, but it was later displayed as part of one of the five major United States Bicentennial exhibits the museum curated. The "We the People" exhibition, which the desk was displayed in, opened on June 4, 1975, and focused on the American people and American government.

=== Oval Office desk ===
Jimmy Carter returned the Resolute desk to the Oval Office in 1977. On the afternoon of his January 20 inauguration, Carter made his first visit as president to the Oval Office. He later said he "sat down at the President's desk and looked it over. It was a surprise to see that it was not the same one which had been photographed when John Kennedy was there, with his little son peeping out from the door underneath. My first decision: to replace this desk with the one I remembered." The next morning over breakfast he chose the Resolute desk from a set of images of desk options. The Resolute desk has been used by every president since in this room except for George H. W. Bush who used it for five months in the Oval Office before moving it to his Residence Office in the Treaty Room of the White House. Bush used the C&O desk in the Oval Office instead. Bill Clinton returned the Resolute desk to the Oval Office on his first day as president on January 20, 1993.

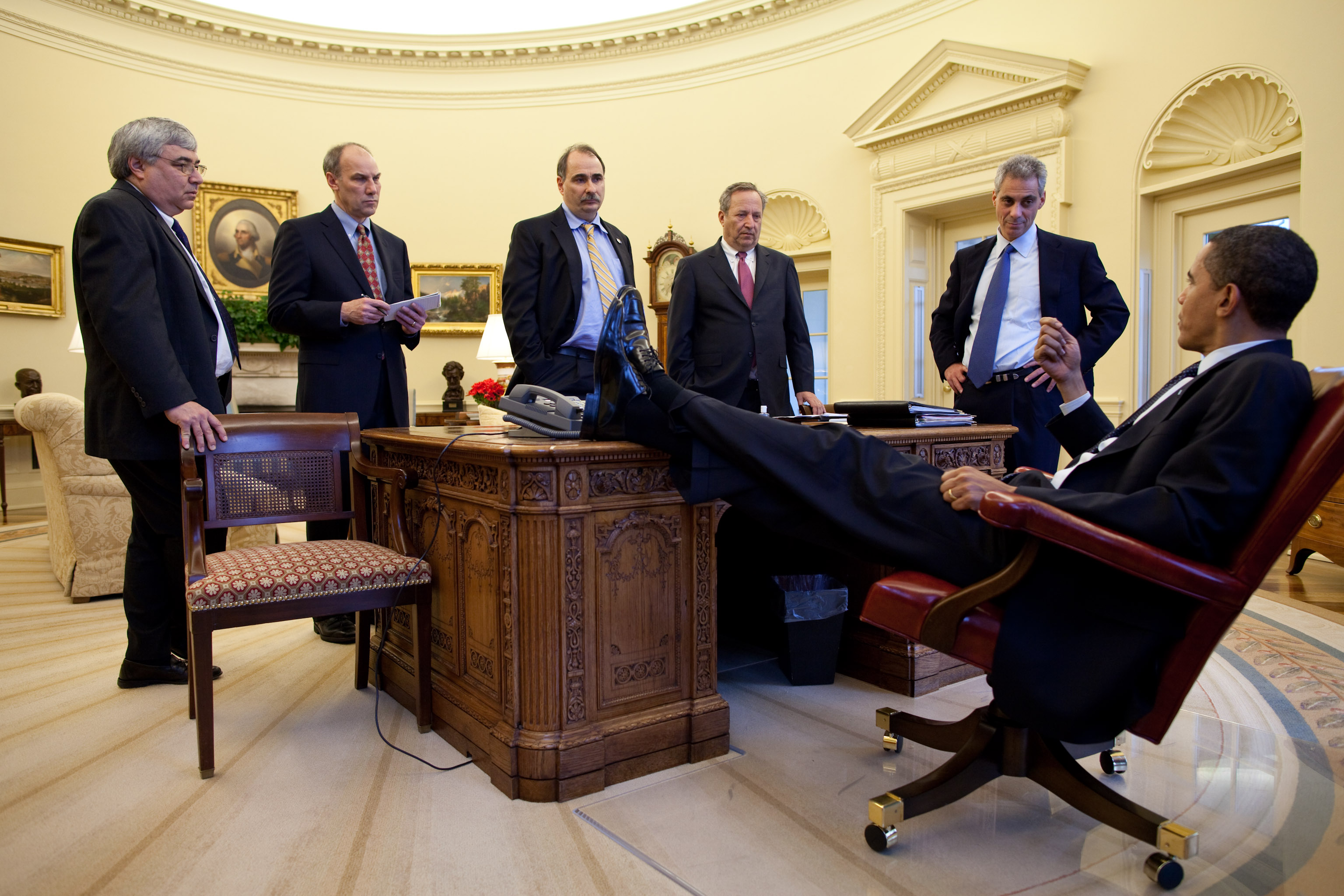
Obama, 2009

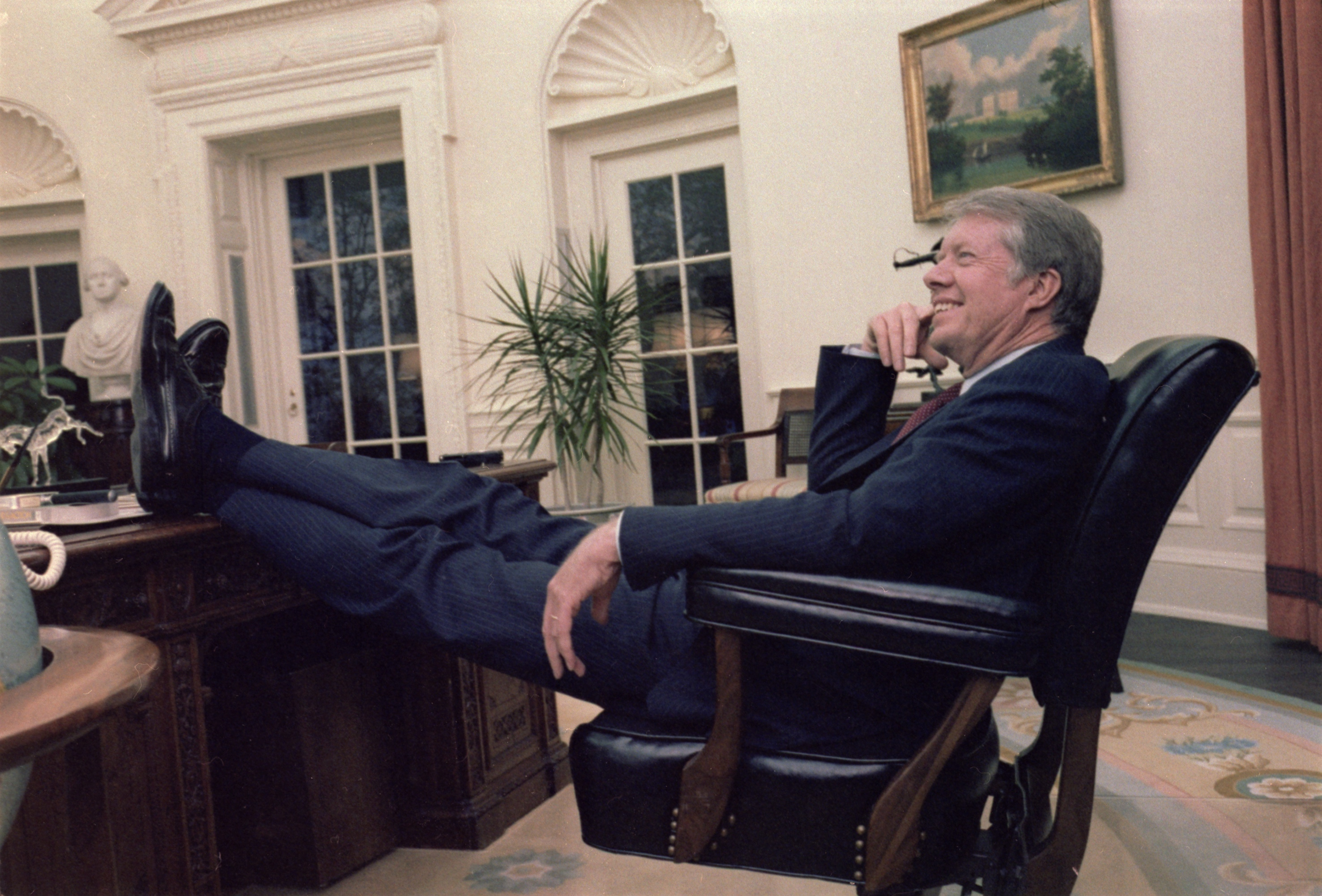
Carter, 1978

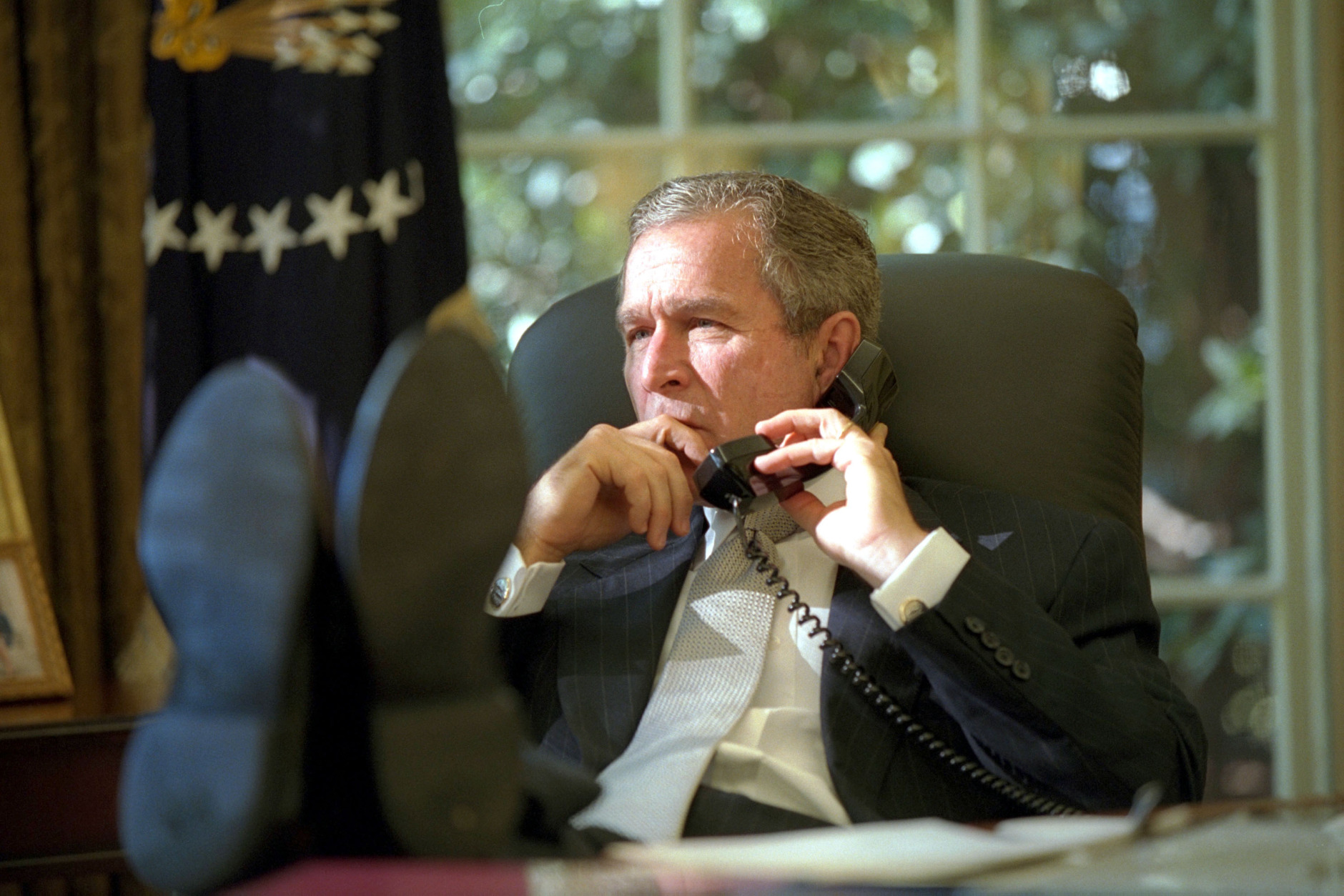
GWB, 2001

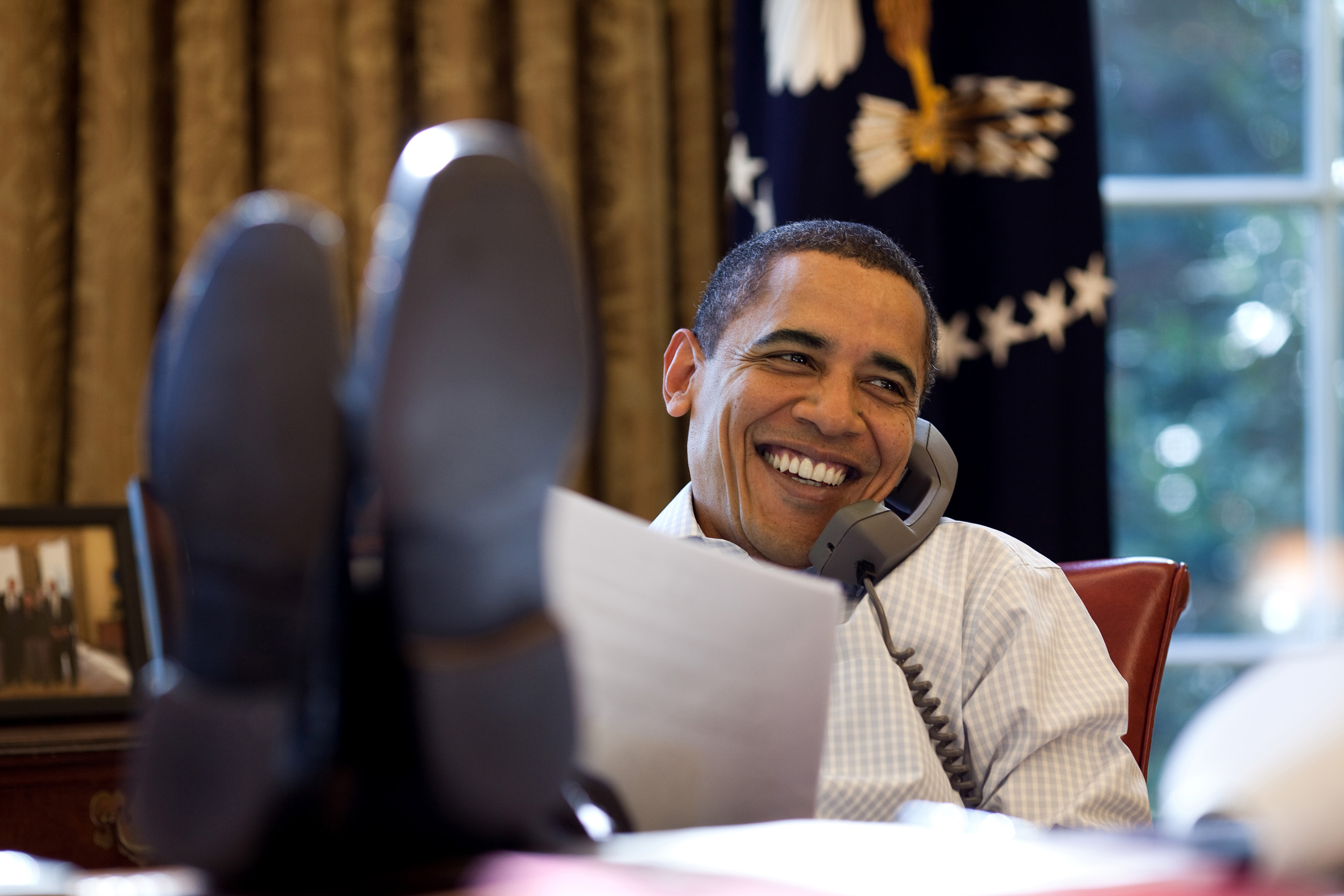
Obama, 2009

Many presidents have been photographed with their feet up on the desk.

In 2009, British Prime Minister Gordon Brown visited President Barack Obama and gave him the original framed commissioning papers for HMS Resolute and an ornamental pen holder made from the timbers of the anti-slavery ship HMS Gannet. Gannet began its service the same year that Resolute was broken up and the pen holder was made in the same joiners' shop as the Resolute desk.

Obama also found himself in a minor controversy in conservative media when in 2013 photographs were released showing him with his foot resting on the Resolute desk. Multiple other presidents have also been photographed with their feet up on the desk.

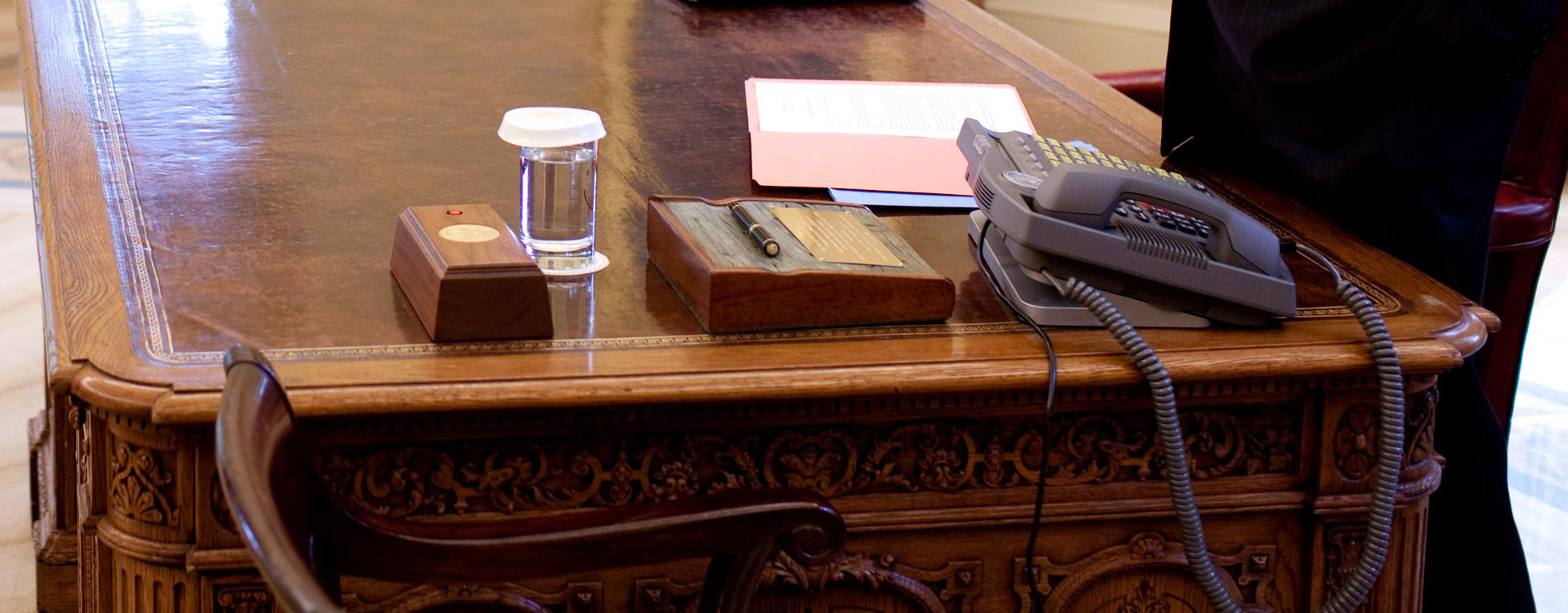
The Presidential call button and HMS Gannet pen holder on the Resolute desk in 2009

A failed attempt to replace the Resolute desk with the Hoover desk was made during the transition to Joe Biden's presidency. Valerie Biden Owens, the sister of President Joe Biden and a member of the team tasked with redecorating the Oval Office for Biden's tenure, wrote in her memoir, "We tried to get FDR's Oval Office desk – I wanted everything Trump had touched out of there – but to this day, the desk resides at FDR's family home in Hyde Park. ... Thus, the desk Trump had sat behind remained."

A button to call aides was noted as being on the Resolute desk since at least the George W. Bush presidency. This button sits in an approximately 9 in (23 cm) long by 3 in (7.6 cm) wide wooden box marked with a golden presidential seal. Donald Trump stated to one reporter that "everyone thinks it is [the nuclear button]".

=== Timeline ===
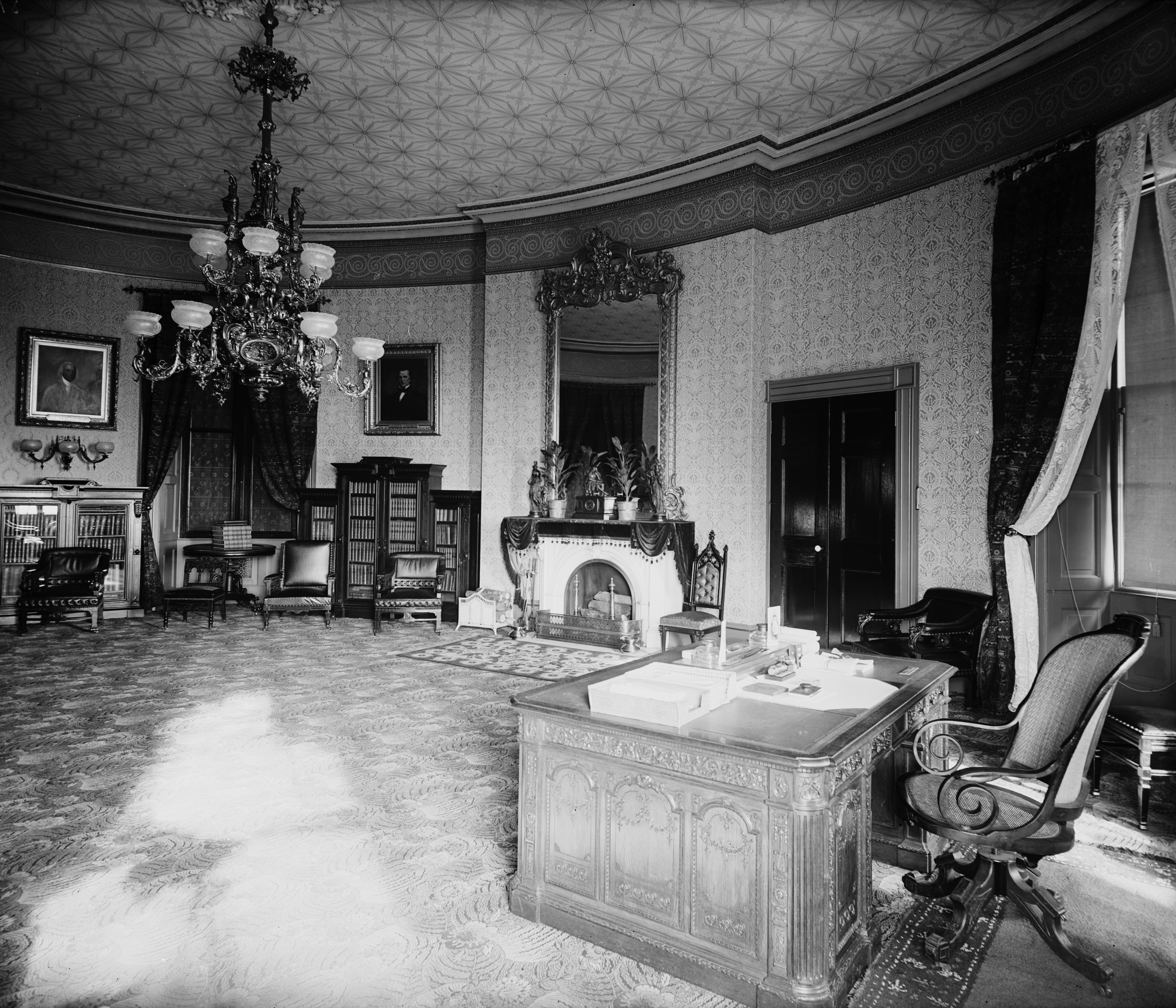
The Resolute desk in the Yellow Oval Room, in 1886, during the presidency of Grover Cleveland

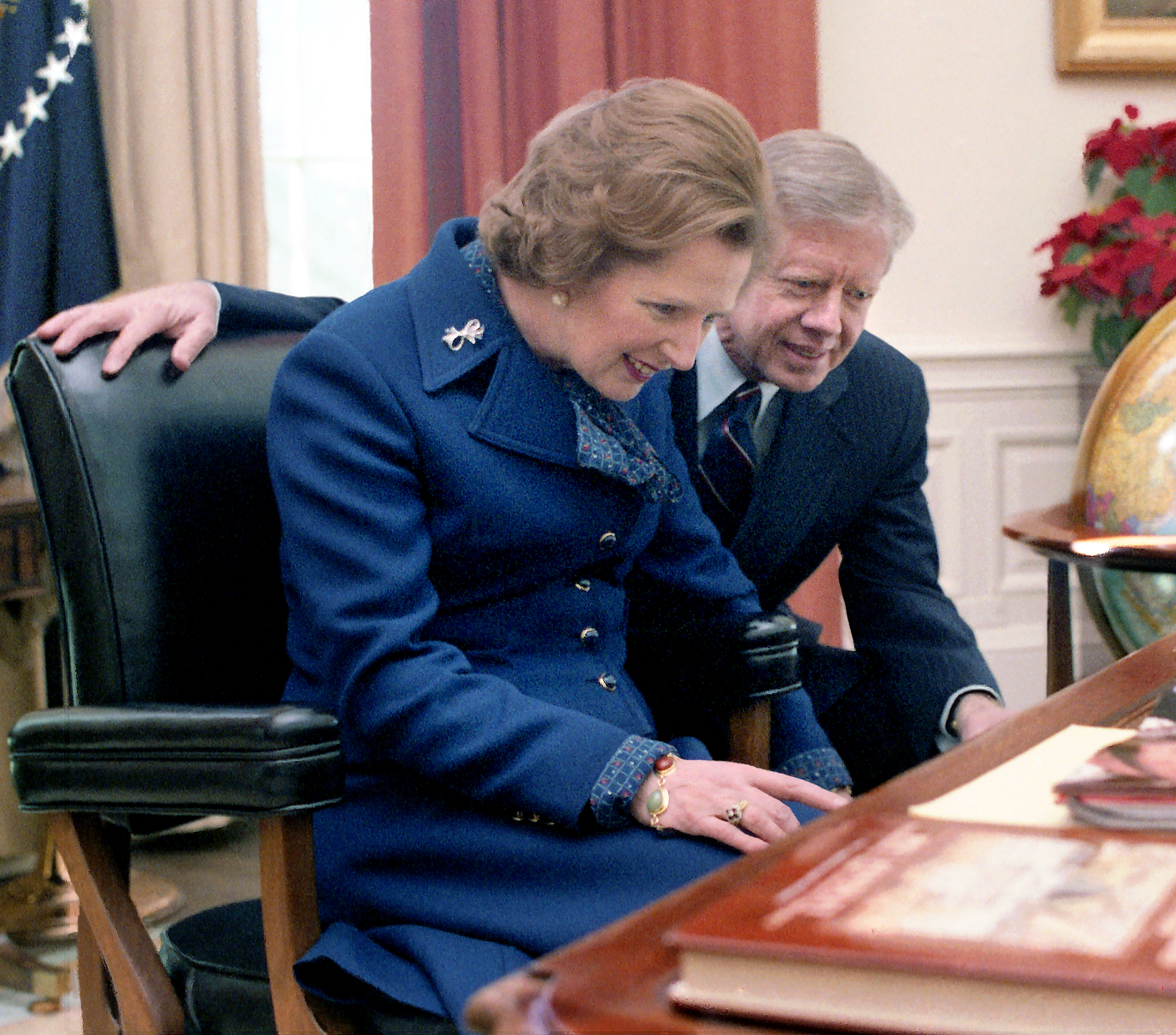
Prime Minister Margaret Thatcher reads the inscription on the front of the desk in 1979, accompanied by President Jimmy Carter.

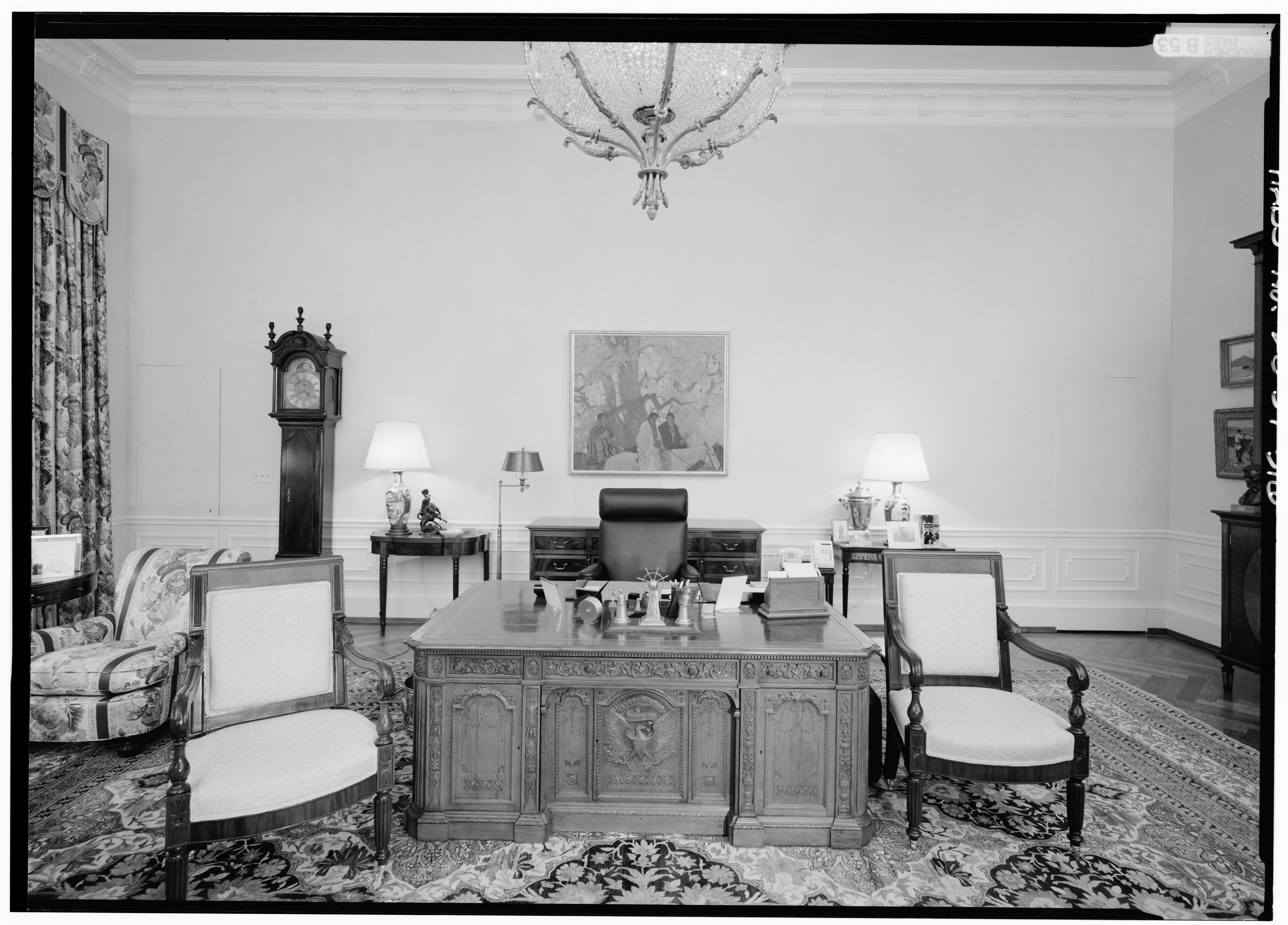
The Resolute desk in the Treaty Room in 1992 during the term of George H. W. Bush

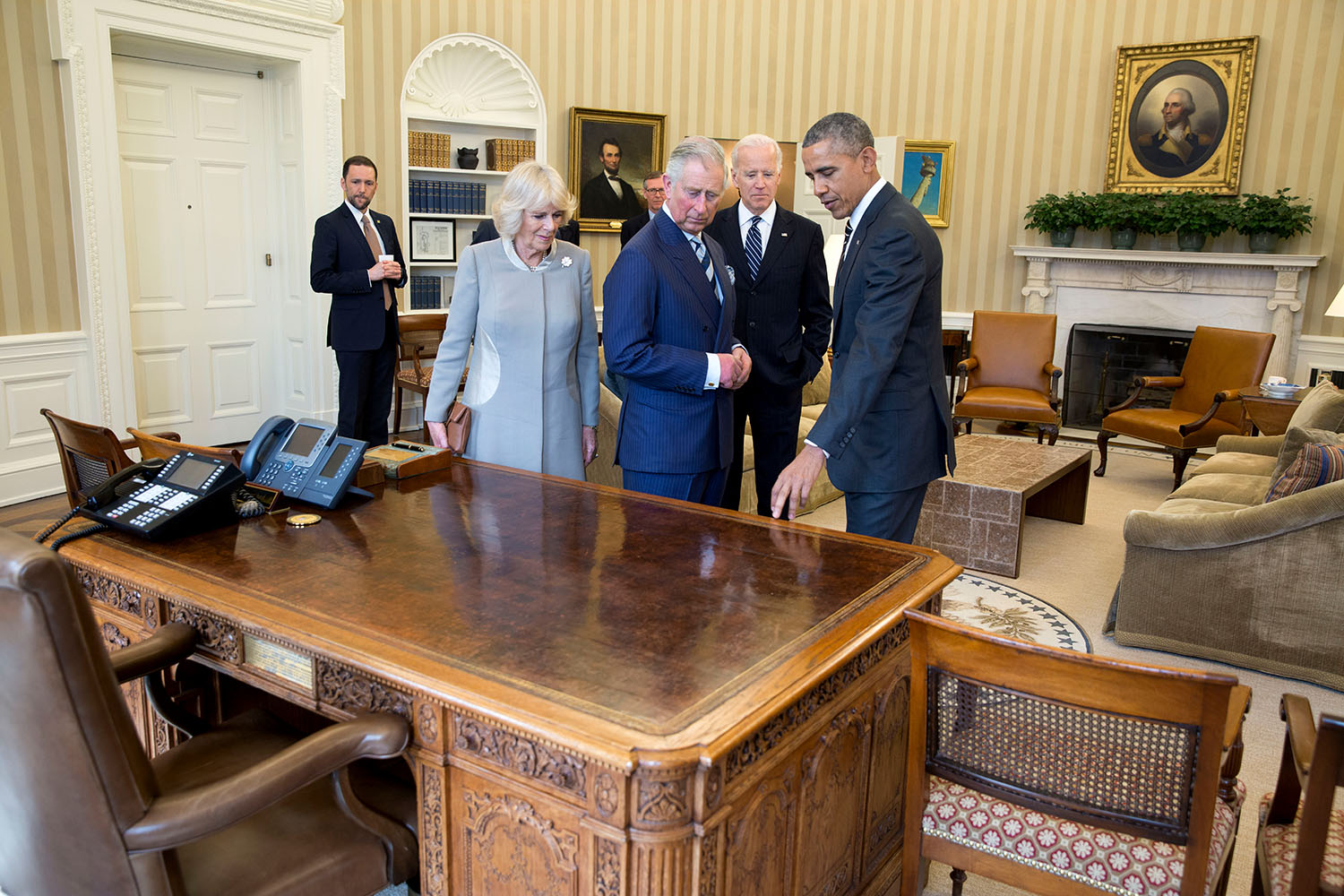
President Barack Obama and Vice President Joe Biden discuss the desk with Charles, Prince of Wales, and Camilla, Duchess of Cornwall, in 2015.

Below is a table with the location of the desk from 1880, when it arrived in America, to the present day. Each tenant of the desk is noted as well.

| Tenant | Location | Dates | Ref. |
|---|---|---|---|
| Rutherford B. Hayes | Green Room; White House | 1880 | |
| Rutherford B. Hayes | President's Office; White House | 1880–1902 | |
| James A. Garfield | President's Office; White House | 1880–1902 | |
| Chester A. Arthur | President's Office; White House | 1880–1902 | |
| Grover Cleveland | President's Office; White House | 1880–1902 | |
| Benjamin Harrison | President's Office; White House | 1880–1902 | |
| Grover Cleveland | President's Office; White House | 1880–1902 | |
| William McKinley | President's Office; White House | 1880–1902 | |
| Theodore Roosevelt | President's Office; White House | 1880–1902 | |
| Theodore Roosevelt | President's Study; White House | 1902–1933 | |
| William Howard Taft | President's Study; White House | 1902–1933 | |
| Woodrow Wilson | President's Study; White House | 1902–1933 | |
| Warren G. Harding | President's Study; White House | 1902–1933 | |
| Calvin Coolidge | President's Study; White House | 1902–1933 | |
| Herbert Hoover | President's Study; White House | 1902–1933 | |
| Franklin D. Roosevelt | Oval Study; White House | 1933–1948 | |
| Harry S. Truman | Oval Study; White House | 1933–1948 | |
| Truman Renovation of the White House; Stored in B. Altman and Company climate controlled vaults, New York City | | 1948–1952 | |
| Harry S. Truman | Broadcast Room (now Office of the Curator); White House | 1952–1961 | |
| Dwight D. Eisenhower | Broadcast Room (now Office of the Curator); White House | 1952–1961 | |
| John F. Kennedy | Oval Office; White House | 1961–1963 | |
| John F. Kennedy Presidential Library and Museum Traveling Exhibition | | 1964–1965 | |
| Smithsonian Institution display | | 1966–1975 | |
| "We the People" exhibition National Museum of History and Technology, Smithsonian Institution | | 1975–1977 | |
| Jimmy Carter | Oval Office; White House | 1977–1989 | |
| Ronald Reagan | Oval Office; White House | 1977–1989 | |
| George H. W. Bush | Oval Office; White House | 1977–1989 | |
| George H. W. Bush | President's Residence Office (Treaty Room); White House | 1989–1993 | |
| Bill Clinton | Oval Office; White House | 1993–present | |
| George W. Bush | Oval Office; White House | 1993–present | |
| Barack Obama | Oval Office; White House | 1993–present | |
| Donald Trump | Oval Office; White House | 1993–present | |
| Joe Biden | Oval Office; White House | 1993–present | |
| Donald Trump | Oval Office; White House | 1993–present | |

== Other items made from HMS Resolute ==
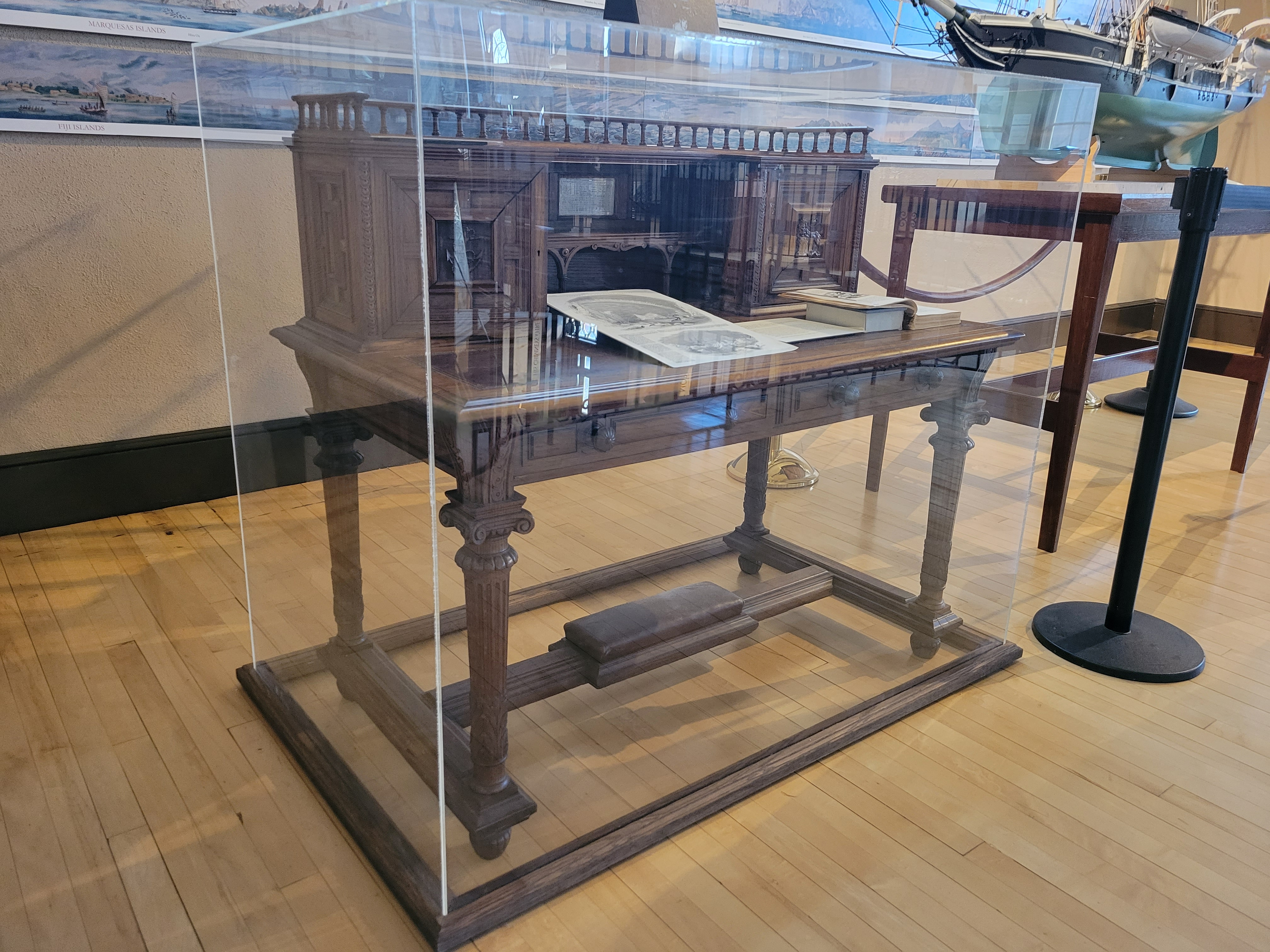
The Grinnell desk on display at the New Bedford Whaling Museum

Carvings on the Grinnell desk

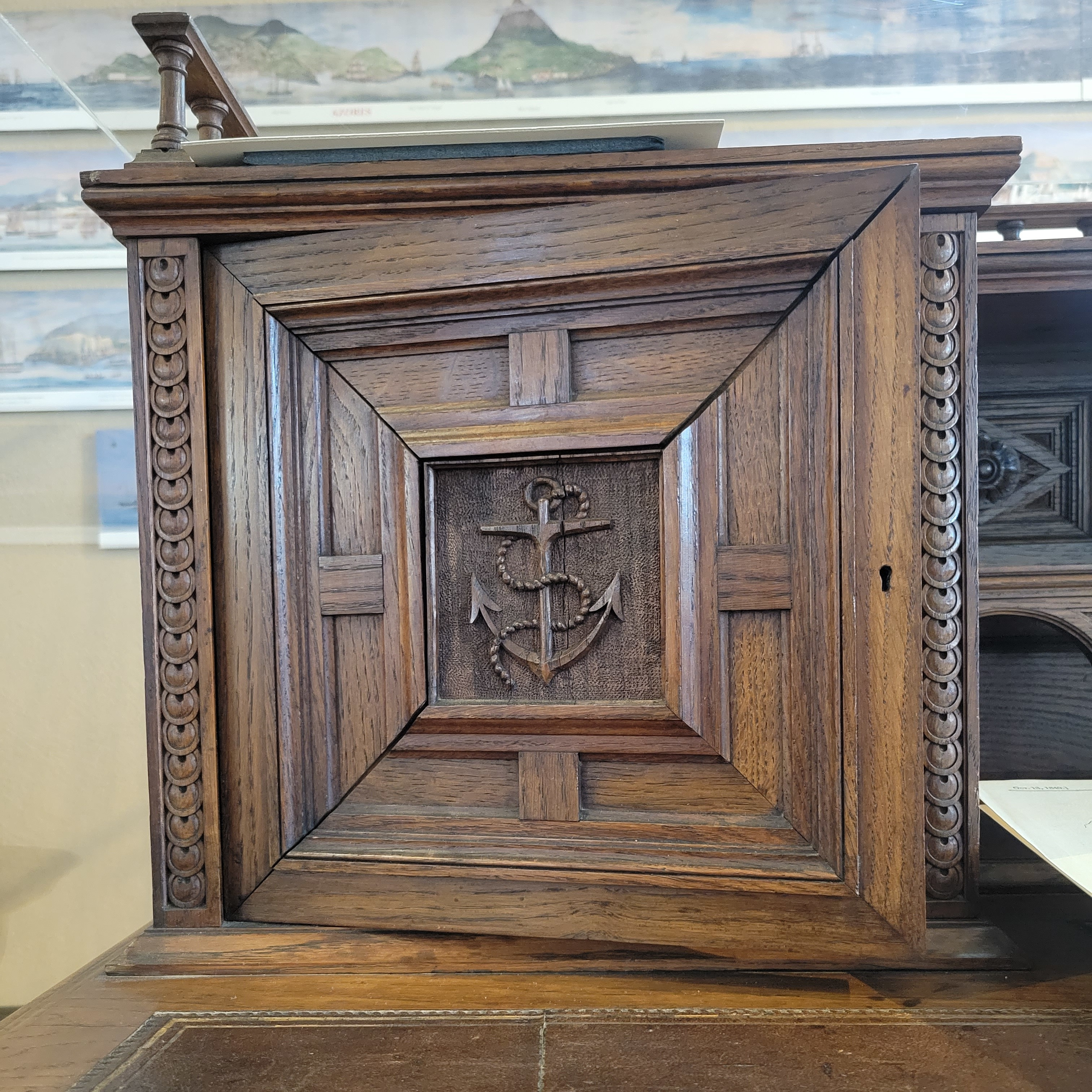
Left door featuring an anchor

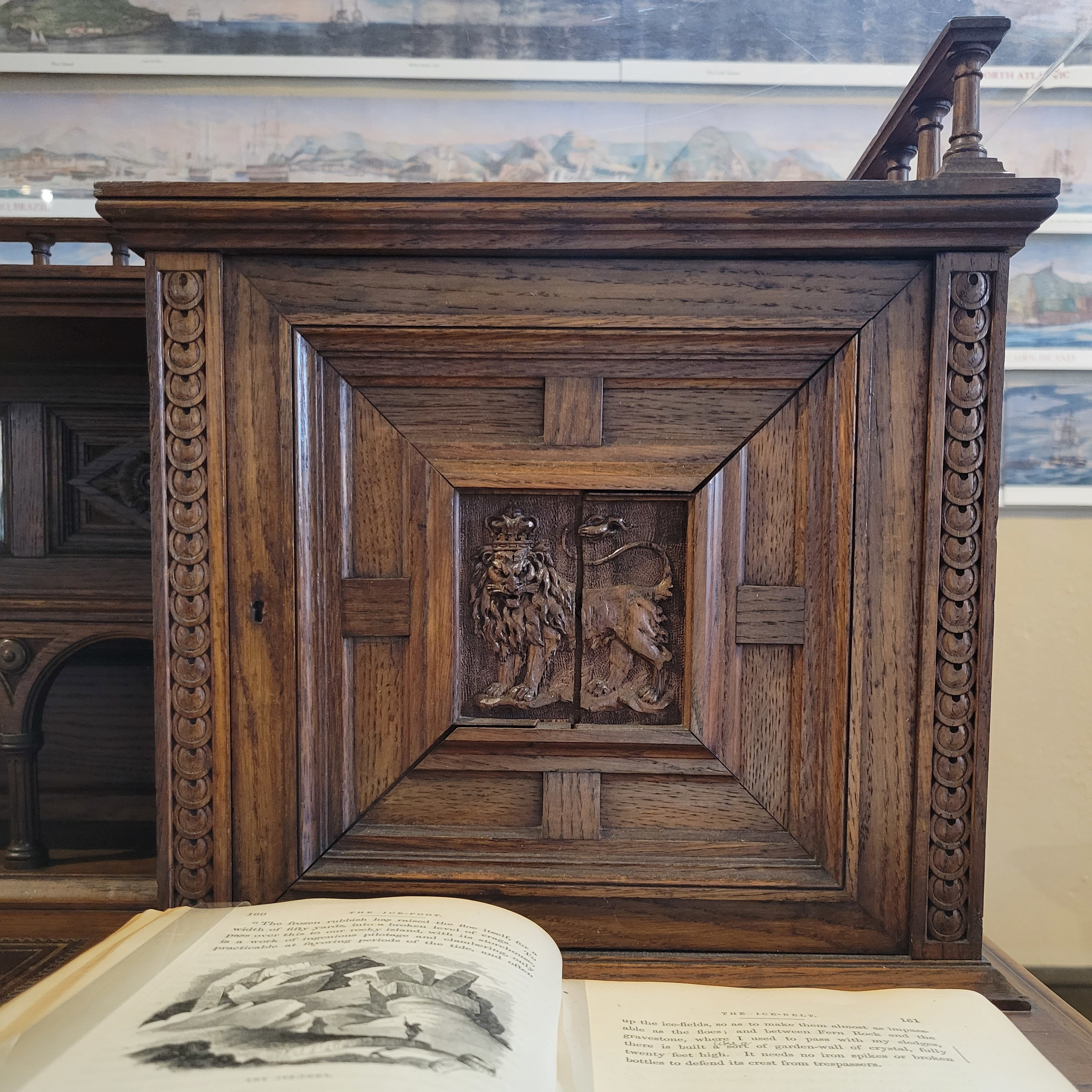
Right door featuring a lion

External image
- Image of a side table built from the timbers of HMS Resolute. Queen Victoria kept this table on HMY Victoria and Albert and it is now part of the British Royal Collection.

Harold Wilson presenting the ship's bell from the Resolute to President Lyndon B. Johnson in 1965

Queen Victoria had a total of three tables built from the timbers of HMS Resolute, of which the desk given to President Hayes was one. According to letters listed in Volume 40 of the Parliamentary Papers, two "memorial tables" made out of timbers from the Resolute were announced as "recently manufactured" by Robert Hall to the Lords Commissioners of the Treasury on November 18, 1880. Hall said that both tables were to be presented by the Queen, with one going to the president of the United States and the other given to the widow of Henry Grinnell. Four days later, on November 22, a second letter described how the Queen has "expressed a desire to have a table manufactured out of the same timbers" and that it was subsequently made by Morant, Boyd, & Blanford for a cost of 62 pounds (equivalent to £6,400 in 2025).

The desk given to Henry Grinnell's widow, in recognition of the large sums of money her husband spent trying to find Sir John Franklin and his ships, is now known as the Grinnell desk. This desk is 42.25 in (107.3 cm) high, 48 in (120 cm) wide, and 26.75 in (67.9 cm) deep. Also designed and made by William Evenden in 1880, the desk has a leather-covered surface, fluted legs, and a leather footrest. The desk has an upper cabinet and two cupboards covered by paneled doors. The left door is carved with an anchor, and the right with a lion. A balustrade sits above these cupboards, and between them sits a shelf with a silver plaque. The plaque states, "This table... is presented by the Queen of Great Britain and Ireland to Mrs. Grinnell as a memorial to the disinterested kindness and great exertions of her late husband Mr. Henry Grinnell in assisting in the search to ascertain the fate of Captain Sir John Franklin, who perished in the Arctic regions." This desk was donated to the New Bedford Whaling Museum in 1983 by Peter S. Grinnell.

Queen Victoria's table was made for use on her steam-powered yacht, HMY Victoria and Albert. This table is now part of the British Royal Collection and stored in Kensington Palace. It is 70 cm (28 in) high, 120 cm (47 in) wide, and 60 cm (24 in) deep. The rectangular side table has a plain top with a chamfered edge. The frieze contains two drawers. Both the frieze and legs have blind fretwork decorations. This table also has a brass plaque stating the Resolute "was purchased, fitted out and sent as a gift to Her Majesty Queen Victoria by the President and people of the United States as a token of goodwill and friendship. The table was made from her timbers when she was broken up in 1880."

While Parliamentary papers list expenditures for only three tables, Captain Michael Taylor, a docent at the New Bedford Whaling Museum who focuses his studies on the Grinnell desk, stated in a lecture that "it is believed a fourth may also have been made". Martin W. Sandler notes in his book, Resolute: The Epic Search for the Northwest Passage and John Franklin, and the Discovery of the Queen's Ghost Ship that Lady Jane Franklin, the widow of Sir John Franklin, may have also received a desk.

The National Maritime Museum, one of the four-member intuitions of Royal Museums Greenwich, holds a few other objects created from the timbers of the Resolute. These include three picture frames, a paper knife, and a box bearing a brass plaque. The museum also has a block of wood from the Resolute and the ship's figurehead, which is in the shape of a polar bear. Other parts of the ship are held by various museums, including the ship's clock at the Vancouver Maritime Museum and the ship's spyglass and sextant at the New London County Historical Society. The Resolute's bell was given to President Lyndon Johnson by UK Prime Minister Harold Wilson in 1965.

== Replicas ==
The replica desk at the John F. Kennedy Presidential Library in Boston, Massachusetts

The first mention of creating a replica of the Resolute desk comes from a memo sent from Jacqueline Kennedy on April 2, 1963, only two years into John F. Kennedy's presidency. J. B. West, the White House Chief Usher at the time, included the text from this memo in his memoir Upstairs at the White House; my life with the First Ladies. Jacqueline Kennedy wrote the following to him:

Would Mr. Arata [the White House upholsterer] know of any wonderful wood carver? The absured [sic] reason I ask this is that I am thinking very far ahead: In his Library, the President (like President Truman) wishes to have a replica of his office—heaven knows, he picked the worst possible desk to duplicate.

I thought if there was a wood carver around, perhaps he could do such a thing by stucco, or wax impressions—would you find this out, perhaps from Smithsonian? You could tell them that some museum wants a duplicate of the desk, the best way this could be done, and let me know when you do.

This first attempt at creating a replica fell to the National Park Service but the techniques they chose to use turned out to be too expensive. This attempt to create a replica was abandoned.

Construction of the replica Resolute desk for the George W. Bush Presidential Center by Eli Wilner & Company

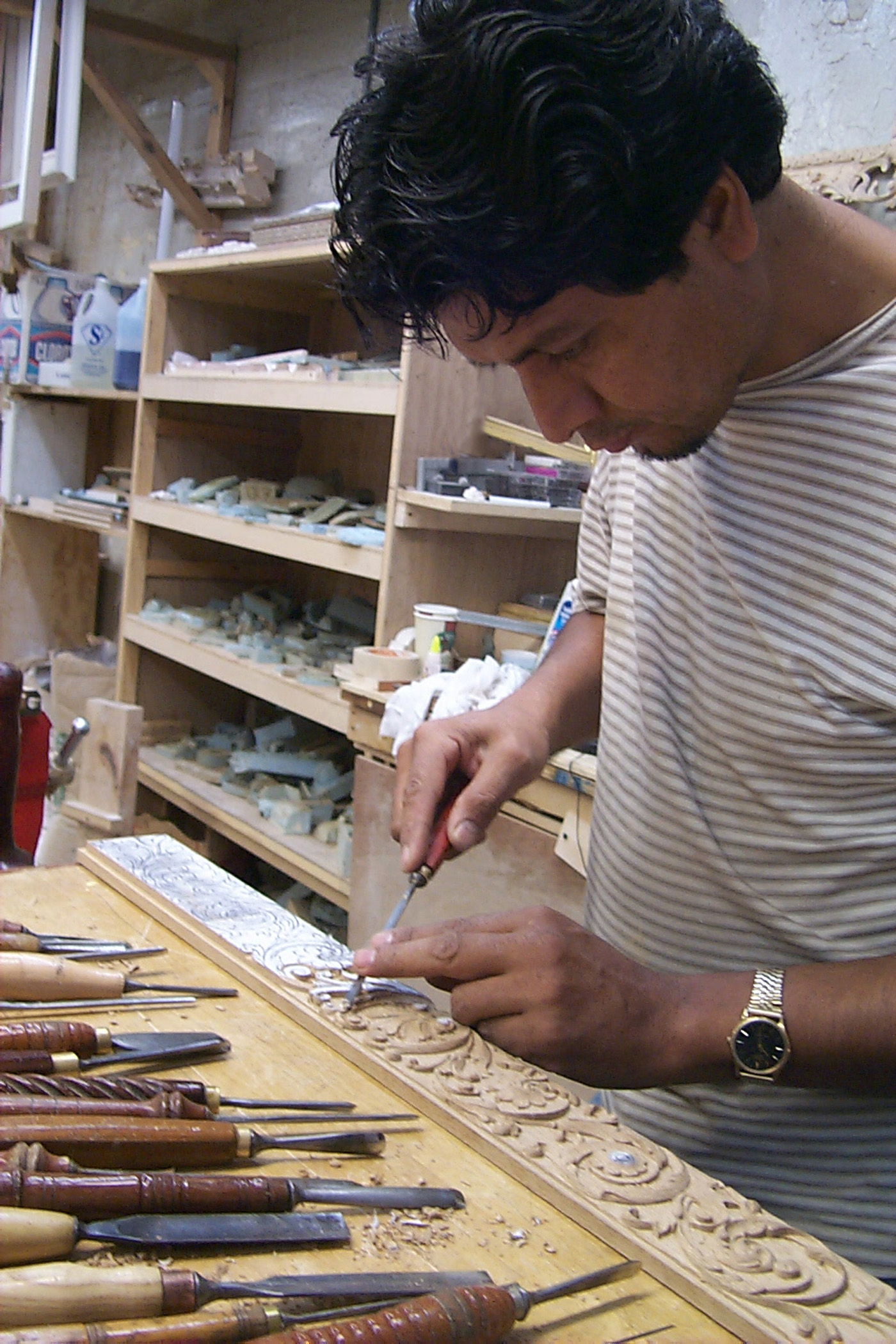
Carving the frieze

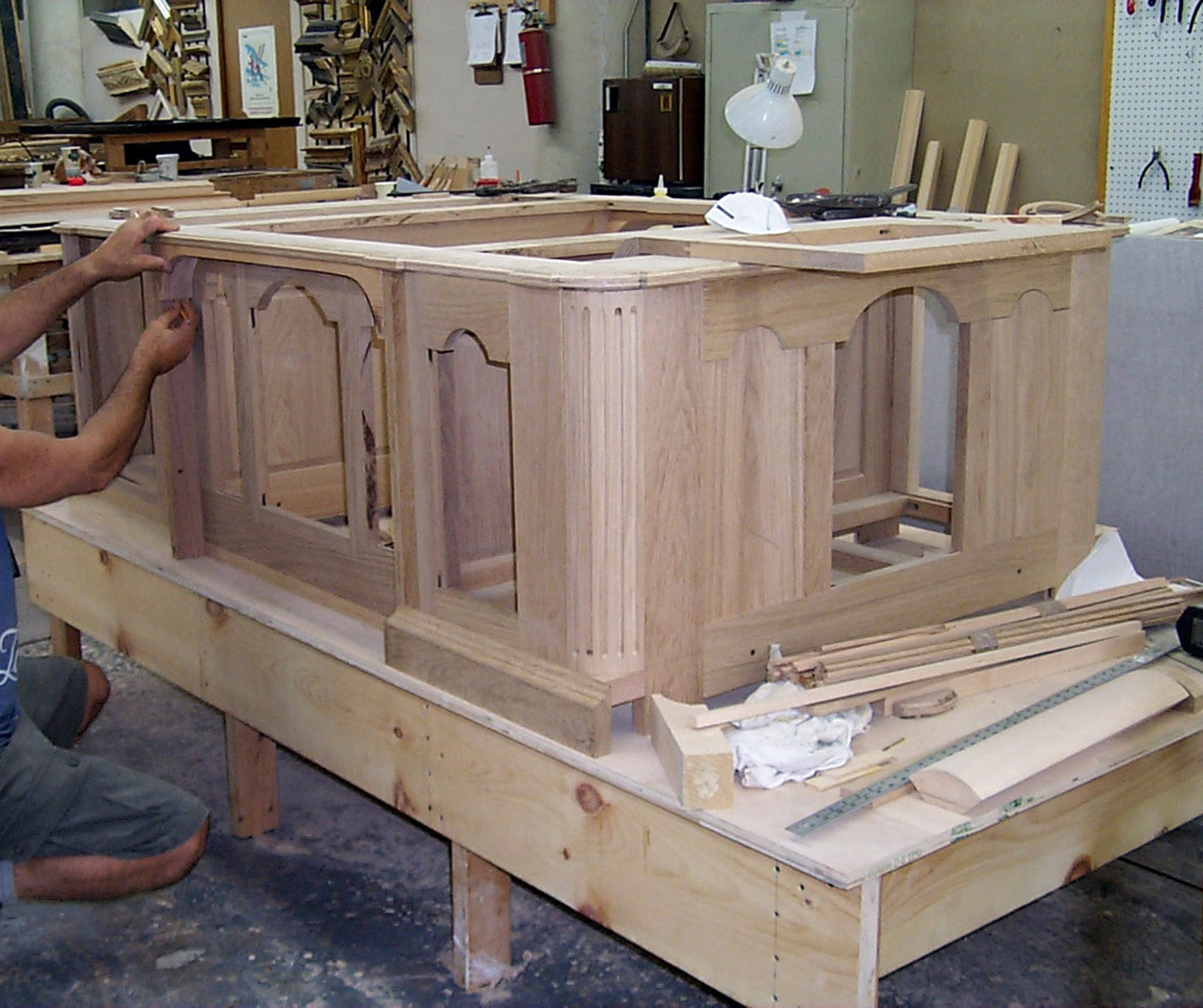
Assembling the desk structure

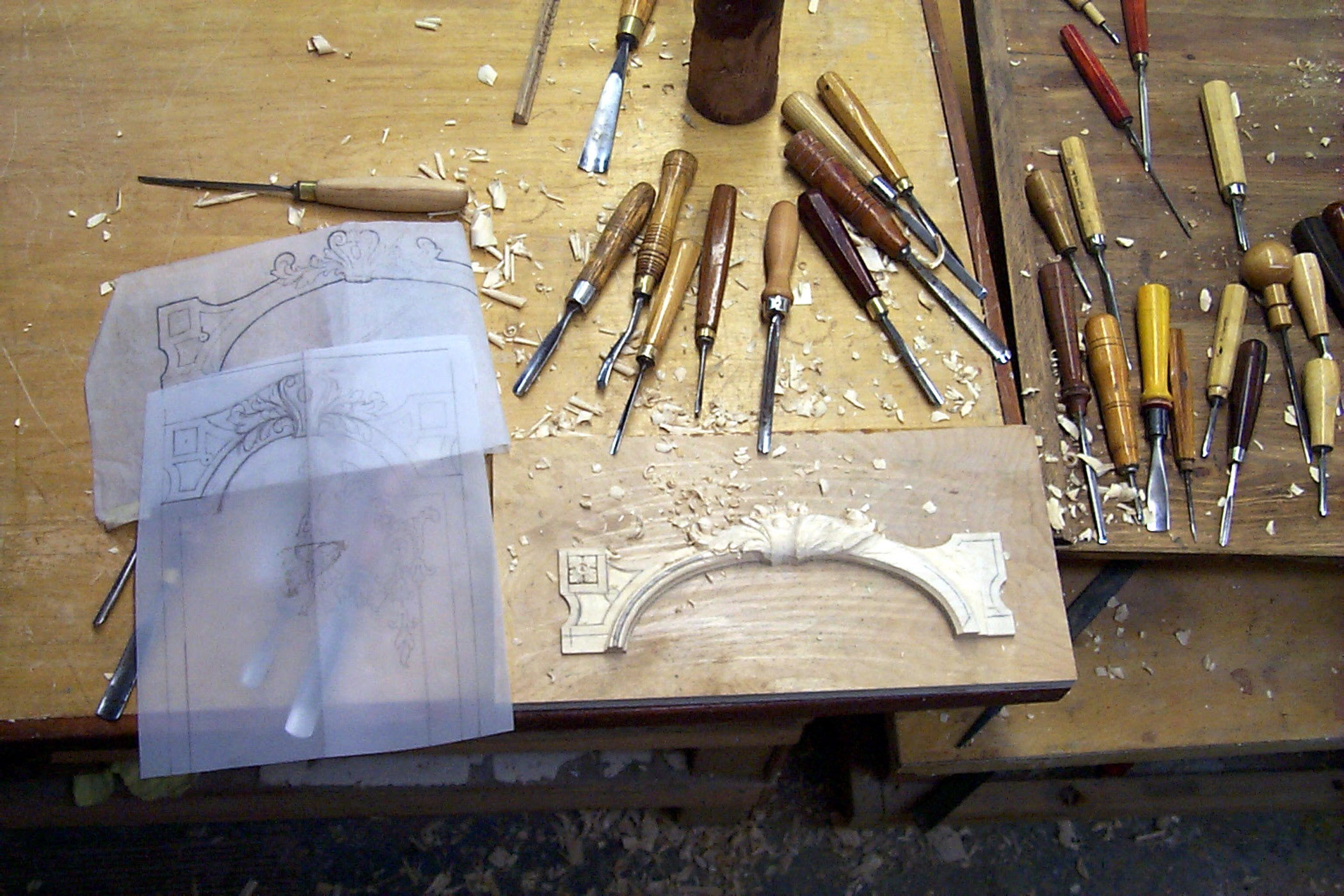
Carving the panels

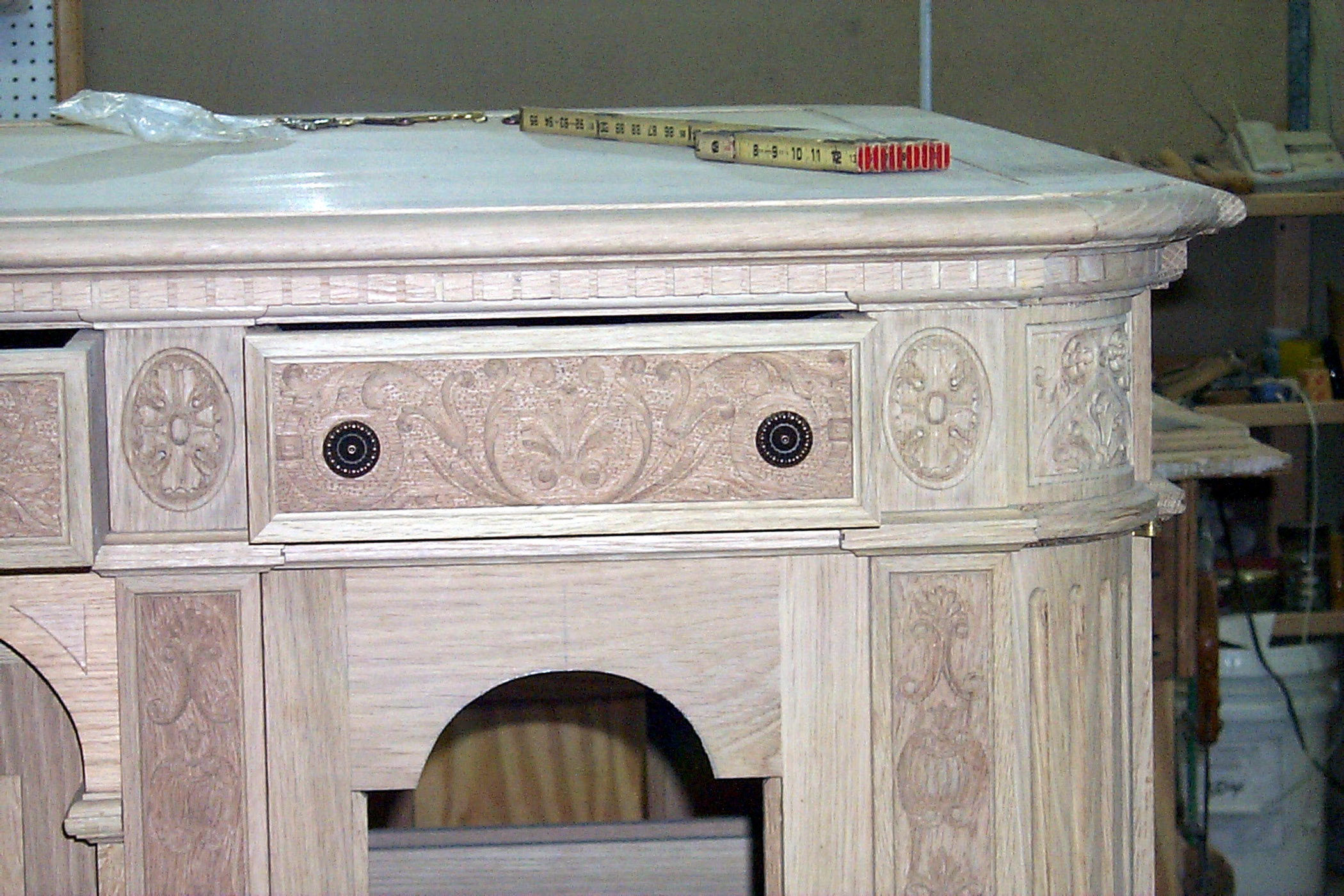
Installation of drawers

The first successful replica of the Resolute desk was commissioned in 1978 for a permanent display at the John F. Kennedy Presidential Library in Boston, Massachusetts. To build the replica, Robert C. Whitley, an American woodworker, spent three days measuring and photographing the original desk. This was done in the Oval Office while President Jimmy Carter was away in Germany. The replica desk took almost a full year to complete and is still found at the Kennedy Library.

Six presidential libraries display replicas of the Resolute desk. Besides the Kennedy Library, the Clinton Presidential Center in Little Rock, Arkansas, the George W. Bush Presidential Center in University Park, Texas, the Jimmy Carter Library and Museum in Atlanta, Georgia, the Ronald Reagan Presidential Library and Museum in Simi Valley, California, and the Rutherford B. Hayes Presidential Center, in Fremont, Ohio, all display a reproduction of the Resolute desk.

Other museums and libraries also display replica Resolute desks. These include the New-York Historical Society's recreation of Reagan's Oval Office in New York City, The Presidents Hall of Fame in Clermont, Florida, the Treehouse Children's Museum in Ogden, Utah, the Star Spangled Center at The Magic House in Kirkwood, Missouri, the American Village Citizenship Trust in Montevallo, Alabama, and the George and Barbara Bush Center at the University of New England in Biddeford, Maine. A replica of the plaque affixed to the Resolute desk is displayed by the Kane Historic Preservation Society in Kane, Pennsylvania.

Other tourist attractions across the United States exhibit replica Resolute desks. These include Madame Tussauds museums in Washington, D.C., Hollywood, Las Vegas, and New York. The Rogue Valley International–Medford Airport has an Oval Office meeting facility featuring a smaller replica of the Resolute desk, and Conservative Grounds, a Donald Trump-themed coffee shop in Largo, Florida, has a replica Oval Office and Resolute desk in the back of the store.

Several private houses and replica Oval Offices display copies of the Resolute desk, including the Ron Wade House in Longview, Texas, a 10,000-square-foot home in Kirtland Hills, Ohio, and Norton Manor, the Potomac, Maryland home of Frank Islam.

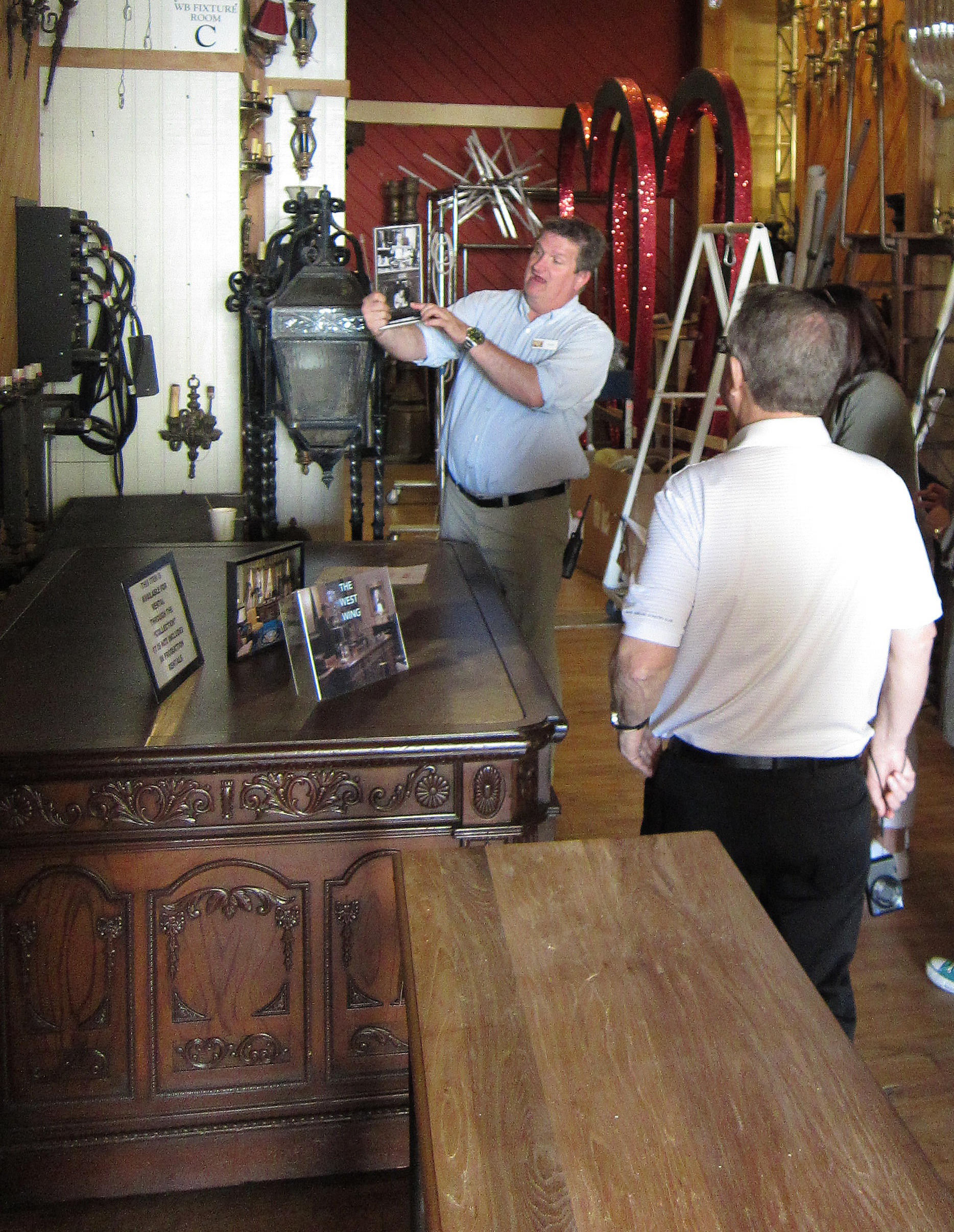
The replica desk from The West Wing during a tour of the Warner Bros. Prop House

There are multiple permanent Oval Office sets in Hollywood, all with a replica Resolute desk. The Castle Rock set was built in 1995 for The American President and the films Nixon (1995) and Independence Day (1996) used it. The set built for the 1993 film Dave subsequently hosted over 25 films, including The Pelican Brief (1993), Clear and Present Danger (1994), and Absolute Power (1997). The replica Resolute desk from The West Wing is in the Warner Bros. Prop House where it can be seen on studio tours. A replica of the desk was used in the 2007 film National Treasure: Book of Secrets, in which a secret compartment in the desk contained pieces of a clue to the location of treasure.

Jim Warlick, the owner of American Presidential Experience, owns five Oval Office replicas, each with its own Resolute desk. The most recent of his replica rooms cost $60,000 to build. These replicas are rented out for approximately $30,000 a week and have been used for book cover images, the television show Little People, Big World, the San Diego County Fair, television ads, and other media. The replicas are stored across the country including in Los Angeles, in Virginia, and near Atlanta.

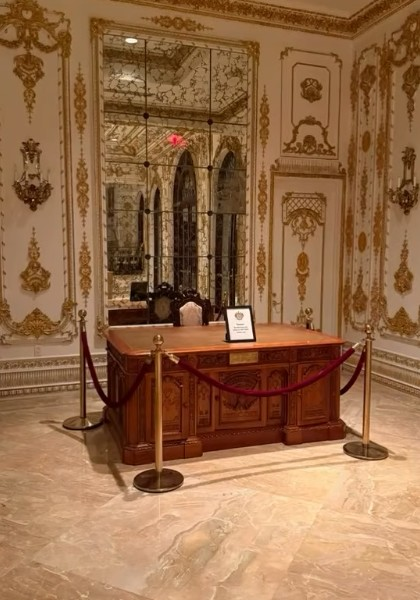
Replica desk at Mar-a-Lago

A replica of the desk was on display during the 58th Venice Biennale as a part of Kenneth Goldsmith's exhibition HILLARY: The Hillary Clinton Emails. Hillary Clinton sat at the replica for nearly an hour, leafing through over 60,000 of her emails that were printed out.

A disproportioned replica of the Resolute desk is on display in the Mar-a-Lago lobby. French cabinetmaker Rémi Le Forestier responded to a Snopes article about this replica claiming it was one he had designed, created, and sent directly to Mar-a-Lago in early 2025. Le Forestier claims it is made with lumber from Belleau Wood.

The commercial sale of presidential furniture reproductions is a small but growing business. Companies such as New York First Co. and Victorian Replicas build or distribute replicas of the Resolute desk for commercial buyers. In a 2009 article in Woodshop News, David Newton from Victorian Replicas said that he had sold more than fifty replica Resolute desks. According to him, "Some people use them in their homes, and a large number of people who are lawyers like to have them." Replicas were also on sale in 2015 through SkyMall for $5,499, through the John F. Kennedy Presidential Library's online store for $6,999.99, and in 2020, a full-scale replica of the Oval Office was put up for auction as part of Bonhams American Presidential Experience Auction for $40,000–$60,000.

== See also ==
- Bureau du Roi
- Henry VIII's writing desk
- United Kingdom–United States relations
