= Resolutes =

Resolutes may refer to:

- Elizabeth Resolutes, an early baseball team in New Jersey
- Cincinnati Resolutes, predecessor of the Cincinnati Reds baseball team (History of the Cincinnati Reds)
- Boston Resolutes, a Negro Baseball League team
