= Credenza desk =

Modern wall-mounted secondary work surface for offices

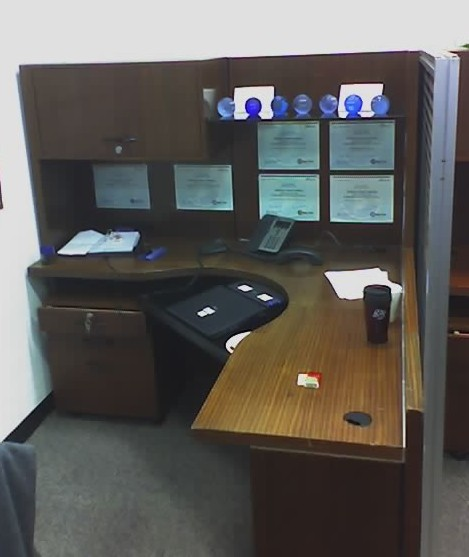
A credenza desk

A credenza desk (often simply, credenza) is a modern desk form usually placed next to a wall as a secondary work surface to that of another desk, such as a pedestal desk, in a typical executive or "corporate management" office.

== Uses ==
=== As an active work surface ===
A credenza is a work space whose "function" is for "very active and busy people." In such instances, "proxemics" is important. When used as an active work surface, the credenza desk is often placed against the wall immediately behind or perpendicular to the main desk, but close enough that the user can reach it from the seated position at the main desk by simply swivelling and wheeling their office chair over to it. It would typically be used for extra storage as well as an open work surface for paperwork, filing, or other tasks taking up more room than would be practical at the main desk (often due to the presence of a computer).

The credenza desk is often used as a computer desk, thus leaving the possibility of keeping the surface of the main desk completely free, when this is required. An executive desk is often the central artifact for a meeting between several persons. A computer monitor or a printer or even a simple keyboard on the surface can be impediments to the exchange.

=== Less frequent usage ===
When its planned use is to be less frequent, such as holding books or files which are not regularly referenced, or to act as an extra surface to help facilitate larger meetings, credenza desks are often placed on a wall in some other location of the office, such as adjacent to a conference table if one is present. Many conference rooms that have meeting tables but not desks will also have a credenza desk against one wall.

== Shape and form ==
The credenza desk is sometimes flat, like a pedestal desk, but more often than not it has a stack of shelves, small drawers and other nooks above its main working surface. The sum of these overhead amenities is usually called a hutch. Hence, the credenza desk is often called a "credenza with hutch".

The credenza desk is comparable in form to but differs from the armoire desk in that it is seen for the most part in large office buildings (instead of home offices, like the armoire desk) and most of its storage spaces are wide open. However, a credenza can be used for a home office.

== Matching sets ==
Credenza desks are often, but not always, part of a matching set that can include pieces such as a primary desk, a conference table, a cabinet for a whiteboard, a bookshelf, filing cabinets, chairs, or other items of furniture which are likely to be found in an office environment.

== See also ==
- Credenza
- Law office management
- List of desk forms and types
