= Field desk =

Portable military desk

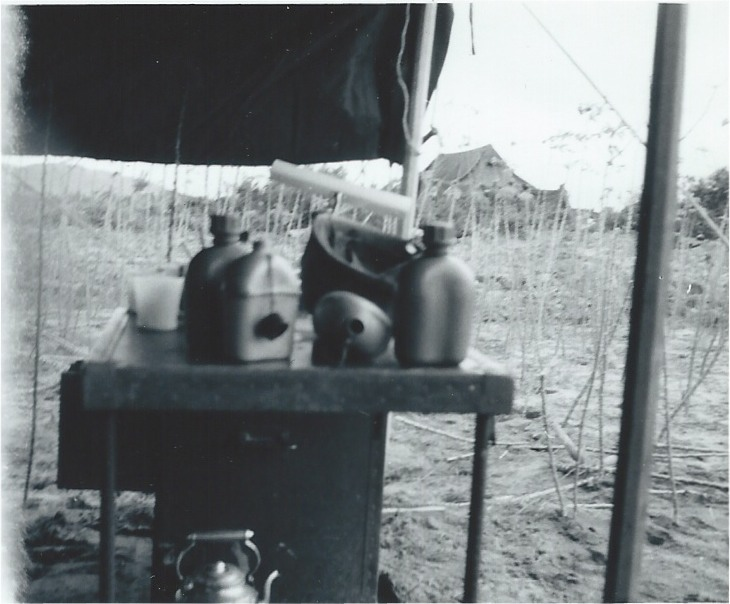
Field desk in Vietnam, Operation Double Eagle, 1966

A field desk is a portable desk which is meant to be used in rear areas near a battlefield and moved around rather frequently in difficult conditions. It is in contrast to the campaign desk, which is usually heavier and meant for areas further in the rear.

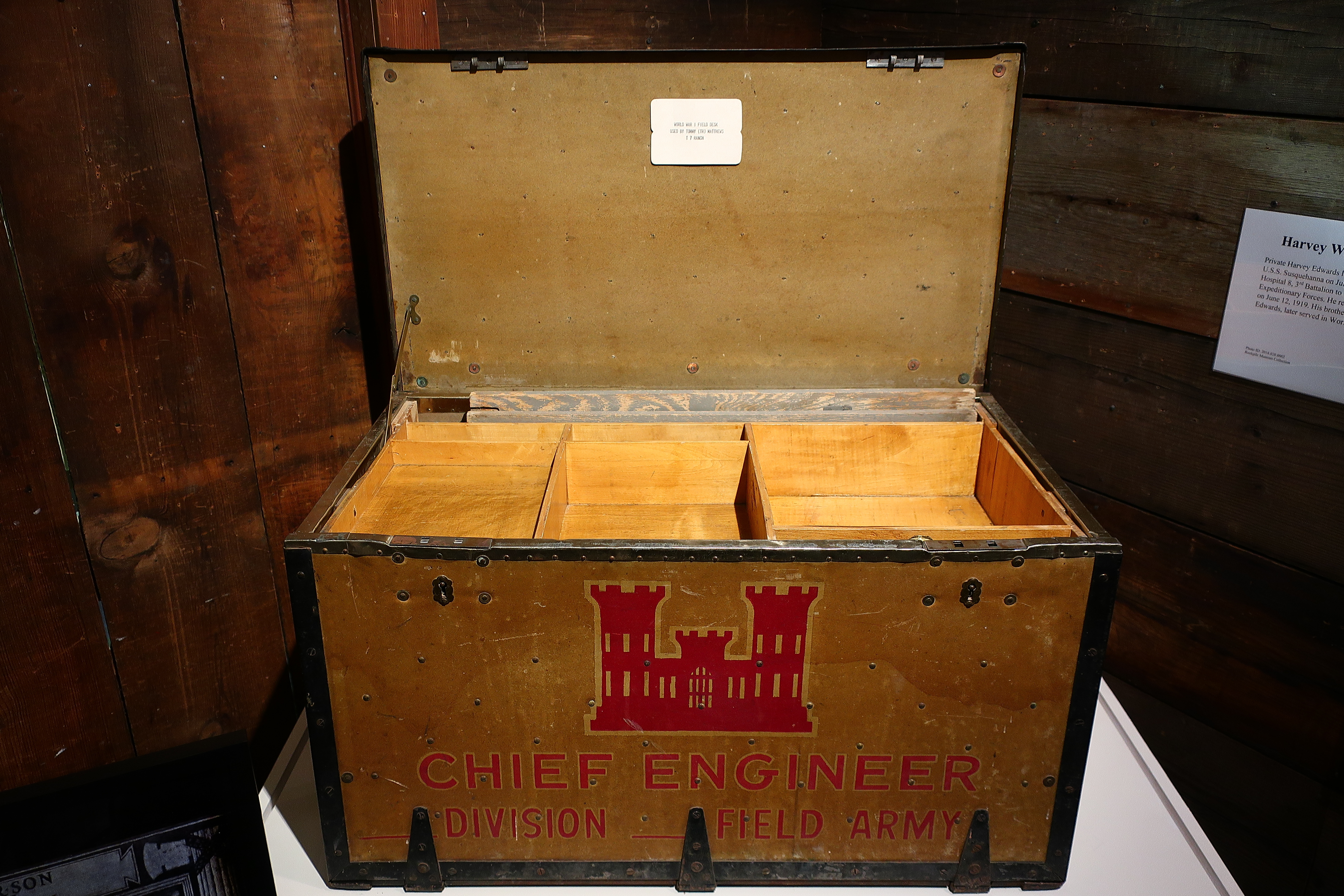
World War I field desk

The field desk is both an antique and a modern desk form. The antique form is usually made of fine woods and brass fittings. The smaller versions can often be confused with the civilian writing slope. This is quite understandable, because during the 18th and 19th centuries they were often used interchangeably. There are a wide variety of antique field desks, ranging from small suitcase-sized ones to fairly big chests. The field desk was an officer's "office in a box."

The most common modern field desk is made of resistant plastic composites and steel or aluminium. It is built to NATO standards or to the standards of national armies. There are several variants, but the most common one is a nearly cubic chest whose lid is removed to expose internal drawers and then reattached on the side to serve as a desktop.

== See also ==
- List of desk forms and types
- Campaign furniture
