= Campaign desk =

A campaign desk is an antique desk of normal size which was used by officers and their staffs in rear areas during a military campaign.

The campaign desk was usually the private property of the officer, as was his uniform and other military implements. It was in general handcrafted by a master cabinet maker according to the officer's wishes or following traditions for such desks. The desk forms varied greatly, but nearly all had as a common trait several features which made it easy to transport them from one campaign posting to another.

For instance, a campaign desk version of a traditional pedestal desk form would have strong but removable fittings making it easy to break up the desk in three pieces: two pedestals and one desktop surface. Each piece would have brass or iron handles mounted on it to facilitate handling.

Campaign desk variations of the antique writing table seem to have been rather frequent. This form was usually in one piece, with strong handles and two pairs of folding legs.

A smaller version of such a transportable writing table could be considered to be more a field desk than a campaign desk, since it could be moved frequently from one battlefield's rear area to another as the war went on.

Any campaign desk is in a sense also a portable desk.

== See also ==
- List of desk forms and types
- Campaign furniture
