= List of Cajun Pawn Stars episodes =

This is a list of episodes from the reality television series Cajun Pawn Stars, which airs on the cable network History.

== Series overview ==
Season	Episodes	Season premiere	Season finale
1	8	January 8, 2012	February 6, 2012
2	17	June 4, 2012	August 1, 2012
3	20	September 12, 2012	December 12, 2012
4	7	December 26, 2012	January 10, 2013

== Episodes ==
=== Season 1 ===
No. overall	No. in season	Title	Original release date	US viewers (millions)
1	1	"Donkeys and Dollars"	January 8, 2012	3.37
Pairs of 5,000 and 10,000 dollar bills, 1930s Bonnie and Clyde model Ford car, a donkey herd
2	2	"Sweet and Sour"	January 8, 2012	3.76
Jerry Lee Lewis first record album, Civil War era Colt Dragoon Revolver, pygmy goat
3	3	"Shoeshine Mike"	January 15, 2012	3.71
A Dukes of Hazzard General Lee Dodge Charger; a 1920s shoeshine stand; and a surgeon's field kit used during the Civil War.
4	4	"Money Bzzzness"	January 15, 2012	3.91
A military sniper rifle, beekeeping, a steel hatch believed to be from a World War II submarine
5	5	"Joker's Big Score"	January 22, 2012	1.99
1951 Chevy Deluxe police car, Special Forces M4 Carbine semi-automatic rifle, silver and turquoise leather belt
6	6	"Trick or Trade"	January 22, 2012	2.47
Airboat, Civil War diaries uncovered from a field lap desk compartment that mention Union General William Sherman, 1972 Chevrolet Chevelle car
7	7	"Joker's Wild"	February 6, 2012	3.19
1700s flintlock gun, Greyhound bus that may have belonged to country music legend Barbara Mandrell, motorized wheelchair
8	8	"Speed Demons"	February 6, 2012	2.98
World War II biplane, a strand of Abraham Lincoln's hair, Mako fishing boat

=== Season 2 ===
No. overall	No. in season	Title	Original release date	US viewers (millions)
9	1	"Gimme Some Skin"	June 4, 2012	4.44
Items featured include a pristine M1918 Browning Automatic Rifle, a Porsche 917 kit car with a Volkswagen Beetle chassis, an eleven-foot anaconda skin, and a Clay-Adams human skull model.
10	2	"Some Pig"	June 6, 2012	2.23
Items featured include Shoe Shine Mike's champion show pig, an early 1900s hydraulic dentist chair, a walking stick believed to have belonged to Native American legend Geronimo, and 1911 Colt and Glock pistols -- both fully disassembled.
11	3	"Buy George!"	June 6, 2012	2.26
Items featured include a 1790s pocket watch from George Washington, a Mardi Gras float, a BMW steering wheel, and an antique bateau.
12	4	"Little House on the Bayou"	June 13, 2012	2.08
Items featured include a houseboat on the bayou, a 1966 Ford Mustang (which requires extensive body work), a collection of shivs and shanks, and a rare Civil War document of José Falcón, a former Texas Ranger who served in both the Confederate and Union armies.
13	5	"Under the Gun"	June 13, 2012	2.21
Items featured include a rare World War I military periscope rifle, a Fairbanks-Morse engine from the 1890s, a book of autographs of country-western artists of the 1950s, and a 1950s German military field phone that also doubles as an electric torture device.
14	6	"Cash Cows"	June 20, 2012	2.02
Andrew Bernard stops by to sell his memorabilia related to Judy in Disguise (With Glasses), a big hit for John Fred & His Playboy Band that Bernard co-written with his bandmate, John Fred. Also, the guys seek a business opportunity when they visit a dairy farm owned by their regular customer, Gerald. Other items featured include a classic 1990 Ferrari 348 and an Apache revolver.
15	7	"Trigger Finger"	June 20, 2012	2.12
Items featured include a rare 1921 Tommy gun, a 1920s metabolism tester, a land grant signed over to a woman by President Andrew Jackson, and a scarce pristine 1929 Indian Head gold coin.
16	8	"Fire Sale"	June 27, 2012	2.42
Items featured include a 1975 Mack Fire Truck, an old piece of railroad track known as a Sherman Necktie, a classic 1950s popcorn machine, and a Scooby-Doo "Mystery Machine" ride-on toy and a prototype Scooby and Shaggy talking figurine, in which Jimmy calls on Scott Innes, the voice of Scooby and Shaggy in the late-1990s, to appraise.
17	9	"High Caliber"	June 27, 2012	2.38
Items featured include a .50 caliber modified Boys anti-tank rifle, photos from Apollo 13's legendary splashdown and rescue in the Pacific Ocean, an 1880s railroad lock box that was known to have been on a train robbed by Eugene Bunch, the "Robin Hood of Southern Louisiana", and an old bookbinding machine with letter blocks.
18	10	"Double-Edged Pawn"	July 11, 2012	2.49
Items featured include a pair of Union Civil War swords, a 1931 Ford Model A Cabriolet, a model ship made by a prisoner at the Louisiana State Penitentiary, and an artist's proof of a George Rodrigue Blue Dog print, which was appraised by his son, Joque.
19	11	"Gone Fishin'"	July 11, 2012	2.58
Items featured include a rare 1915 Gibson dual harp guitar, a 1944 Louisiana license plate made of sugar cane, and the FP-45 Liberator, a disposable handgun made by General Motors that was dropped behind enemy lines during WWII. Also, Johnnie and Fred check out a crawfish business.
20	12	"Cash Kart"	July 18, 2012	2.05
Items featured include an ultra fast (though unassembled) racing go-kart, an enormous stuffed lion, a rare double barrel knife pistol, a pitch reader radar gun, and a ship's clock and barometer.
21	13	"Springing Forward"	July 18, 2012	2.08
Items featured include an 1866 Springfield Trapdoor rifle with an unopened box of ammunition, a rare 1784 Fort Stanwix Native American breastplate that was made in Europe, a reproduction of a ship's steering wheel, and a Civil War U.S. Cavalry horse bit.
22	14	"Bird Brains"	July 25, 2012	2.01
Items featured include a muster of peacocks, a rare German WWI Luger P08 pistol, a sinner's desk, a WWI medical kit, and a rare vintage Monarch Cajun accordion, which its owner is selling in order to raise funds to get back his 1915 Gibson dual harp guitar (which he pawned in "Gone Fishin'").
23	15	"Knocked Up"	July 25, 2012	1.99
Items featured include an African fertility chair, a pair of WWI Army knives, a 1971 Fender Precision Bass guitar and a 1950s Flxible bus that was converted into an RV.
24	16	"All Shook Up"	August 1, 2012	1.67
Items featured include an M38A1 U.S. Army Jeep; a purple scarf worn by Elvis Presley during one of his last concerts, when he stopped at the Rapides Parish Coliseum in 1977; a ticker tape machine and a vintage 1960s Gulf Oil gas pump.
25	17	"Mail To The Chief"	August 1, 2012	1.56
Items featured include a letter penned by a very young Bill Clinton in 1970, commenting on the draft; an 1895 Colt Navy revolver with an extremely rare and valuable defect; a tin sign of The Lone Ranger selling Merita Bread, and an MG TD automobile. Also, Jimmie and Tammie check out a Ferris wheel and other amusement park rides.

=== Season 3 ===
No. overall	No. in season	Title	Original release date	US viewers (millions)
26	1	"This Little Piggy"	September 12, 2012	1.28
Items featured include handwritten lyrics to Samuel Francis Smith's My Country, 'Tis of Thee (America), a vintage coin-operated kiddie pig ride, memorabilia associated with famed football player Johnny Unitas, and an SLR-106, a Bulgarian version of the Russian AK-47 rifle.
27	2	"Going Medieval"	September 19, 2012	1.65
Items featured include a rare medieval Norman helmet (originally thought to be a Saxon helmet), the third issue ever printed of the X-Men, a violin originally owned by Roy Acuff, a restored 1967 Ford Galaxie convertible, and a crossbow.
28	3	"4-Wheelin' Deals"	September 26, 2012	1.51
Items featured include letters signed by Richard Nixon, a mandolin, an Amish horse carriage, a customized Grizzly all-terrain vehicle, and a pair of Baker Tower rifles with an unusual stock.
29	4	"Batter Up"	October 3, 2012	1.54
Items featured include a signed Ted Williams baseball bat, a mourning armband worn during Abraham Lincoln's funeral, a 24-karat, gold-plated M16 rifle commemorating the 2003 capture of Saddam Hussein, a Thomas Edison cylinder phonograph, and a 1960s Cushman suicide shifter motorcycle.
30	5	"All Jazzed Up"	October 10, 2012	1.28
Items featured include a drummer's pad signed by Louis Armstrong, his wife and his bandmates, three unopened Prohibition-era whiskey bottles, a World War II Inglis pistol, a 19th-century crank telephone, and a roulette wheel from a Louisiana casino that closed down in the 1950s.
31	6	"Seat of Horns"	October 17, 2012	1.76
Items featured include an old Fowler hunting rifle believed to have belonged to George Washington; a 12-foot Indian-style totem pole featuring animals indigenous to Louisiana; an enunciator off a submarine; a vintage Grammer guitar; and a chair made out of cattle horns.
32	7	"Gone With the Pawn"	October 24, 2012	1.43
Items featured include a massive 40-foot barbecue pit on wheels from Texas; a miniature horse; a prop gun from the movie Gone with the Wind; Confederate war bonds; and Scottish bagpipes.
33	8	"Silver Dollar Spook-tacular"	October 31, 2012	1.50
Items featured include a Royal Crown Cola neon sign from the 1960s; a Headless Horseman action figure from the film Sleepy Hollow, signed by Johnny Depp, Christopher Walken and Tim Burton; a 1967 Cadillac Fleetwood hearse; a Plaza military phonograph said to be from World War I; and a collection of Big Little Books from the 1930s. Also, Jimmie challenges his staff to a scary Halloween costume contest for his haunted house on Halloween night.
34	9	"Shotgun Bowling"	November 7, 2012	1.54
35	10	"Shaken and Stirred"	November 7, 2012	1.33
Items featured include an Aston Martin similar to what James Bond drove; a land grant signed by President James Madison; and a rhinestone stage suit worn by local musician Wade Benson Landry.
36	11	"Pawn n' Chain"	November 14, 2012	1.27
Items featured include a 1960s voting machine; a collection of 1970s Mego super hero action figures; an old Mississippi prison ball and chain, a Persian flintlock rifle, and an arrow made for the film Dances with Wolves.
37	12	"Little Bender"	November 14, 2012	1.18
Items featured include a motorized Coca-Cola mini car; a collection of WWII Japanese tank items, and a diamond fleur-de-lis brooch said to have come from Tiffany & Co.
38	13	"Jimmie at the Bat"	November 21, 2012	1.61
Items featured include an antique corn grading machine; a signed baseball featuring the National League participants of the 1952 Major League Baseball All-Star Game, including Jackie Robinson; a customized Harley-Davidson Road King motorcycle, and a Civil War sword that was forged in New Orleans. Also, as part of the corn grader deal, Johnnie goes on a ride-along in a police car of the grader's seller.
39	14	"A Whole Lotta Jerry Lee Going On"	November 21, 2012	1.64
Myra Lewis, the controversial child bride and ex-wife of singer Jerry Lee Lewis, pays a visit to help appraise some of the singer's memorabilia for her friend, as well as give inside details on her relationship with the singer. Other items featured include a giant Chippendale chair, a 1930s rail-bus, and a camel named "Chewy".
40	15	"Pair of Jokers"	November 28, 2012	1.17
Country musician Ronnie McDowell and drummer D. J. Fontana pay a visit, where Ronnie spots a signed George Jones guitar in the display case. Jimmie said that he's willing to part with it -- in exchange for not just money, but also the Lord Elgin watch that Ronnie is wearing, which Elvis Presley once wore on his television debut in the 1950s. Other items featured include a ventriloquist's dummy, a Cajun boat, and the original Furby.
41	16	"Jimmie's Last Stand"	November 28, 2012	1.28
Items featured include an antique Maytag washing machine from the 1920s, a bust of General George Custer, a model Lone Ranger frontier town cut out from boxes of Cheerios, and a trunk claimed to have been owned by Ernest Hemingway.
42	17	"Ice Chip Off the Old Block"	December 5, 2012	1.15
Items featured include a sno-cone stand, hair claimed to be from Sasquatch, a Civil War-era safe passage letter from Missouri, and a Colt gun commemorating WWI hero Sergeant York.
43	18	"Paintball Cajun Style"	December 5, 2012	1.19
Items featured include a 1963 check made out to a pharmacy by Judy Garland, a 1932 World Series program, a general store post office, and a WWII-era 1903 Remington rifle, which the gang uses as an unusual utensil for abstract art.
44	19	"Mumbo Gumbo"	December 12, 2012	1.33
Items featured include the cannon used in the Colfax massacre of 1873, a handmade Native American bison jacket, and regular customer Gerard's old family gumbo recipe.
45	20	"Horse Play"	December 12, 2012	1.24
Tammie and Johnnie try to lasso a deal on an antique toy horse.

=== Season 4 ===
No. overall	No. in season	Title	Original release date	US viewers (millions)
46	1	"Really Gotta Go Kart"	December 26, 2012	1.48
Items featured include an old, inoperable go-kart, which would be retooled into an unusual go-kart with a toilet; handwritten notes from Dwight D. Eisenhower in 1954, which initiated the start of America's involvement in the Vietnam War; and a classic Ernst Heinrich Roth bass fiddle.
47	2	"Jimmie's Increasingly Bad Day"	December 26, 2012	1.48
Tammy buys a unique bar-on-wheels, but Jimmy has misgivings on whether or not a profit can be made, leading to a wager: if Tammy makes a profit, Jimmy will work her job and she has the day off; otherwise, she'll have to work his job while he takes off. Other items featured include a 1930s horse race gambling machine, which would cost more than its worth to fix; a rare Martin guitar that would be proven to be fake; and a set of celebrity Royal Crown Cola ads from the 1950s.
48	3	"Where's The Fire?"	December 30, 2012	N/A
Items featured include a beautifully restored 1929 Ford Model AA fire engine, and a vintage 1972 Easy-Bake Oven, complete with unopened boxes of mixes. Also, Bruce Mitchell of Swamp People fame stops in looking for a new gun for the upcoming gator season, replacing the one he's "retiring". And Jimmie tries to make a deal to buy all the furnishings at the historic Hotel Bentley, before renovation begins.
49	4	"Dog Duty"	December 30, 2012	N/A
Blast off with the Cajun Pawn Stars when a 1950s Space Commander Ride toy lands in the shop and takes Jimmie on a nostalgic trip back to his childhood days. Jimmie challenges the team to get to work on time, and the last one to arrive has to take care of all four of the shop dogs for an entire day. Also includes a Huey Long Chair and a WW2 1903 Rifle with M1 Grenade Launcher.
50	5	"Yankee Magic"	January 10, 2013	2.15
Country music artist Tracy Lawrence stops by, looking to sell his 1920s Martin guitar. Other items featured include a mechanical bull, and a "Cajun hot tub".
51	6	"The King and His Crown"	January 10, 2013	2.09
Items featured include one of Elvis Presley's teeth, a vintage Batman marionette, and a 1966 Cadillac Fleetwood limousine.
52	7	"Oh Say Can You Pawn?"	January 10, 2013	1.79
Items featured include a promissory note signed by Francis Scott Key in 1814, around the time of the battle that inspired The Star-Spangled Banner, a 1927 Chevrolet Roadster, a zeedonk, and a hybrid zebra-donkey.
