= Rehal (book rest) =

Folding lectern

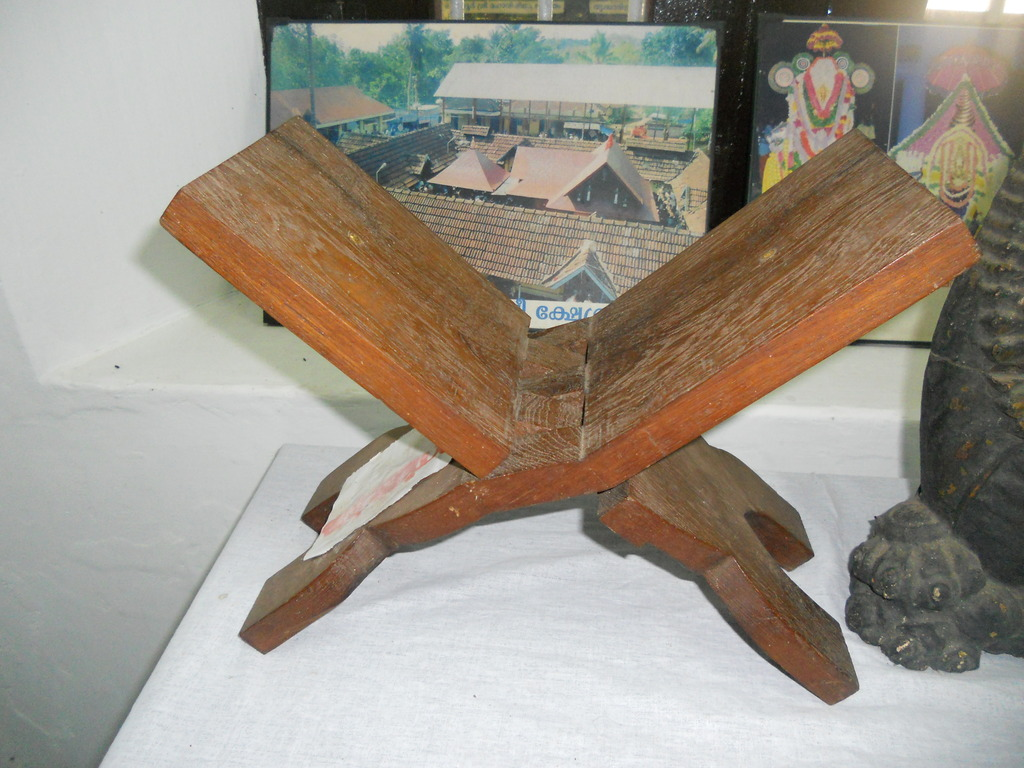
A wooden rehal.

A rehal (Note: Also variously romanised from Urdu and Hindi as rayhal or rihal and from Arabic as rahla or rahil.) (Urdu: رحل, Hindi: रिहल, Bengali: রেহাল, Arabic: رَحْل) or rahle (Turkish: rahle) or tawla (Arabic: طاولة), is an X-shaped, foldable book rest or lectern used to hold religious scriptures for reverent display, as well as during reading or recitation. It is designed to collapse into a flat form for portability and storage when not in use. This book rest, which is usually made of wood, but also increasingly made of other materials such as plastic, is commonly used by Muslims, Hindus, Sikhs and Eastern Christians. Used historically for many generations in South Asian and Arab countries, it is used both to hold and ensure respect for holy books (such as the Qur'an in Islam, the Ramayana in Hinduism, the Japji Sahib in Sikhism, and the Bible in Christianity) by keeping them elevated off the floor.

== Etymology ==
The name "rehal" ultimately derives from the Arabic word rahl (رَحْل) meaning "camel saddle", referring to the resemblance of the unfolded lectern to a saddle. The word has been borrowed into other languages, such as Hindi-Urdu and Bengali.

== History ==
For centuries folding lecterns have served throughout the Islamic world as supports for large Qur’an books used during recitations. They were among the most valuable furnishings of every mosque and were decorated using a variety of techniques, including calligraphy and abstract floral arabesque motifs. Secondary literature maintains that the form of these lecterns had been derived from folding chairs such as those that had already been used in ancient Egypt. Certain English-speaking Muslims refer to the rehal as a "Qur'an stand". Among Christians, especially those living in the Indian subcontinent and in the Middle East, the rehal is used to hold the Bible, having a prominent position on church communion tables, as well as on home altars; in English, these are known as Bible stands, though these can be foldable or fixed at an acute angle.

== Gallery ==
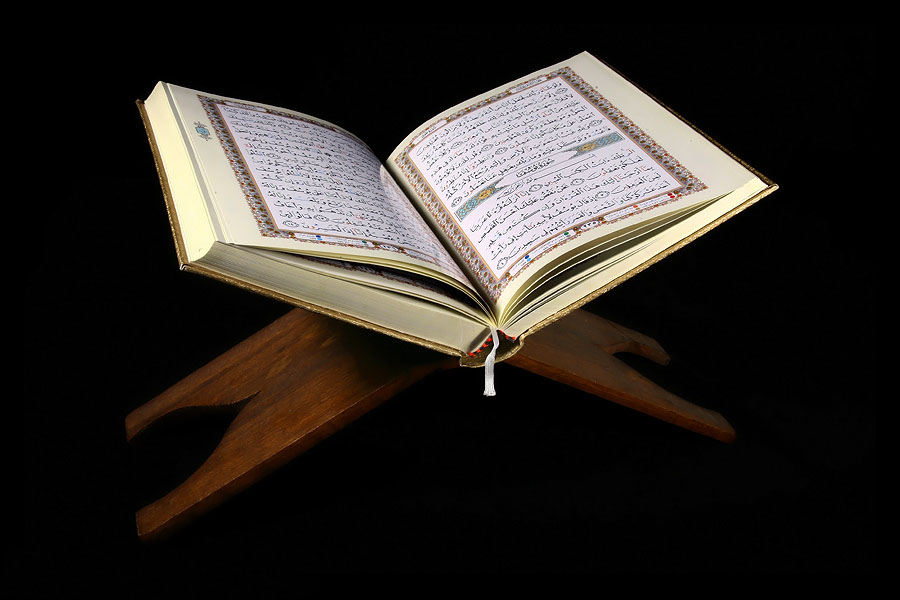
Qur'an and rehal

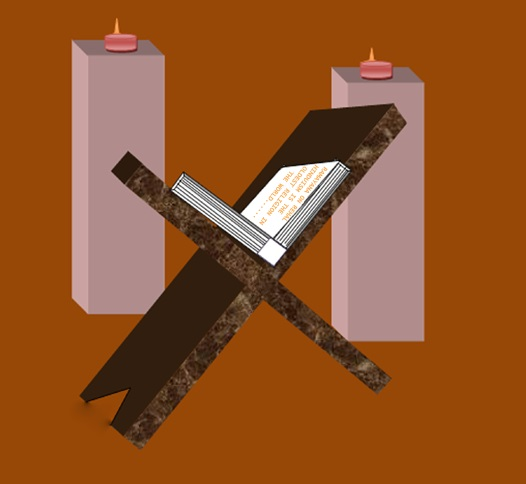
Depiction of a rehal, with the Ramayana placed on it

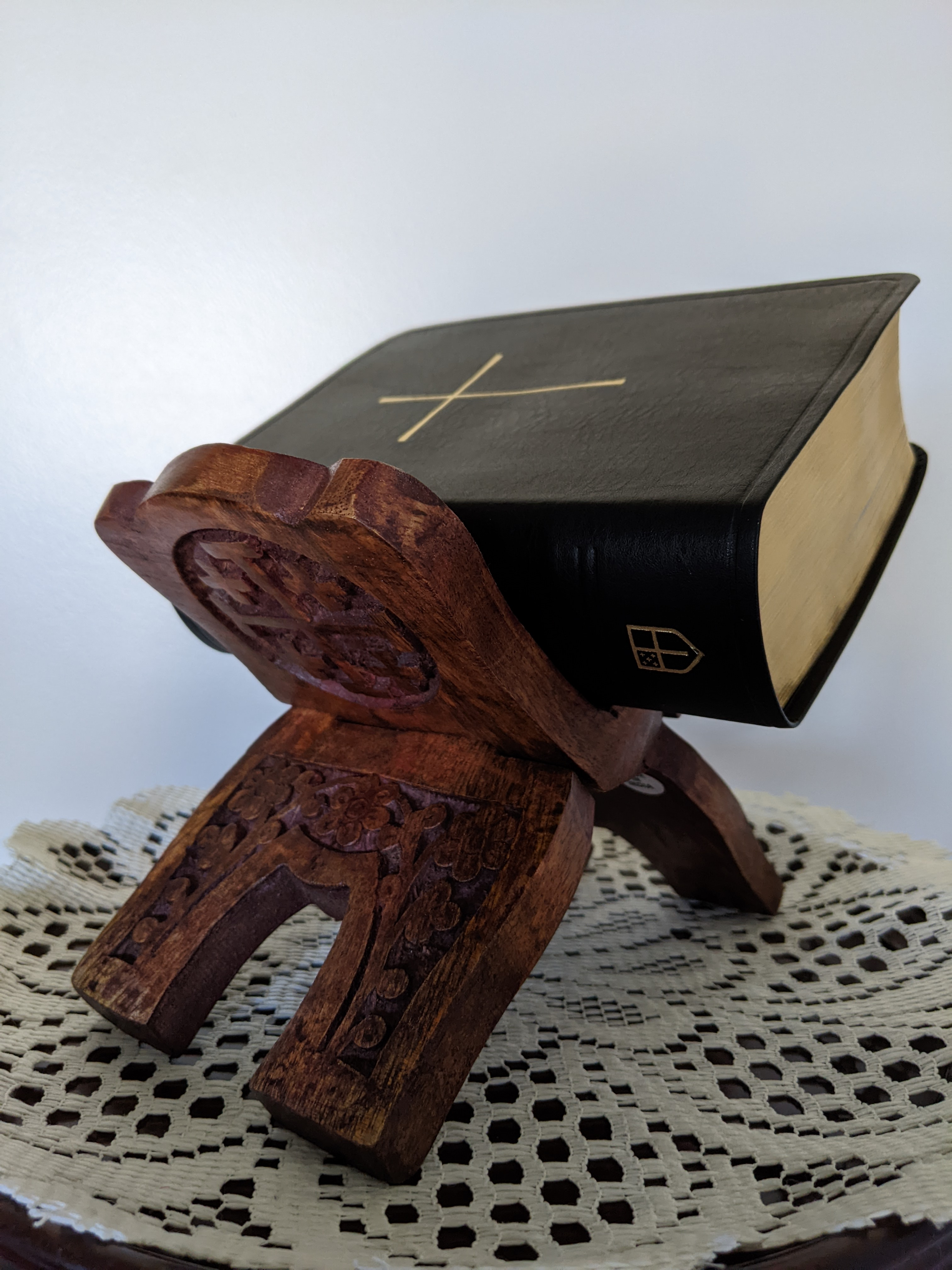
The Bible placed on a rihal engraved with a Jerusalem cross

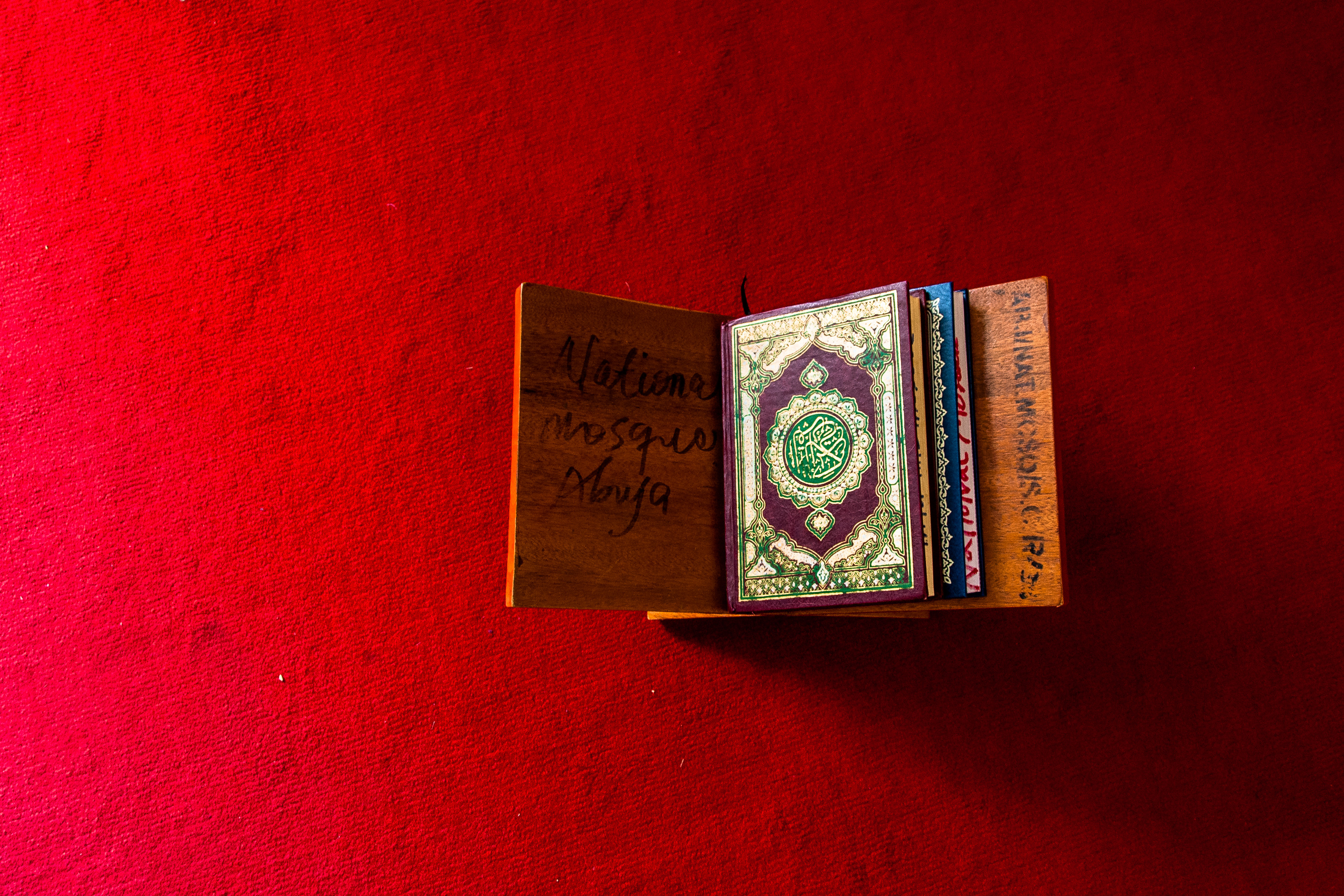
Qur'an placed on a rehal at the Abuja National Mosque, Nigeria

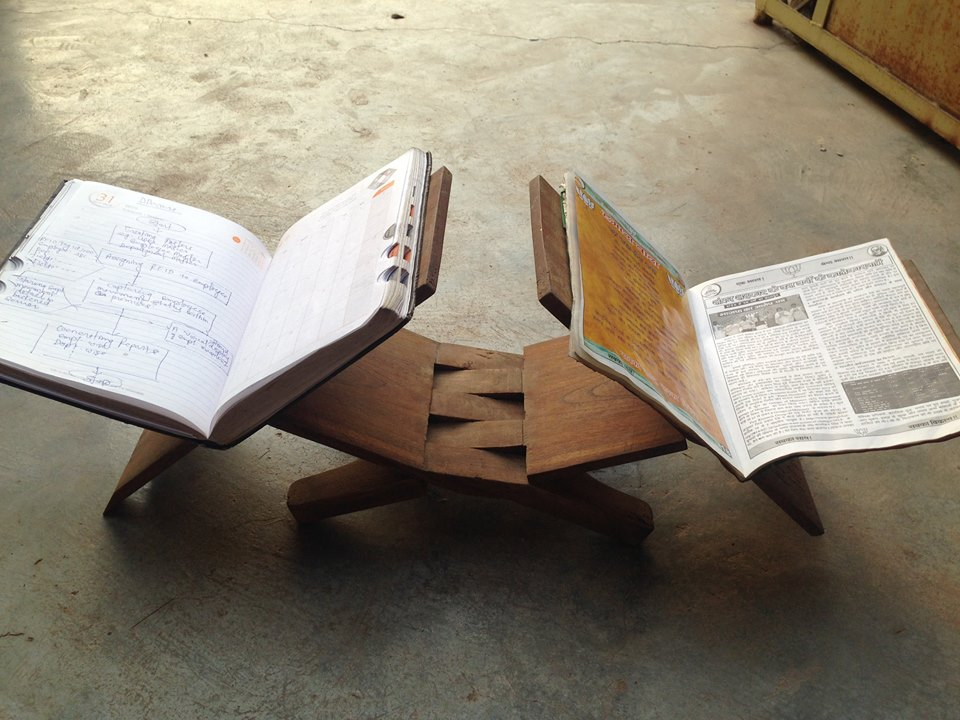
An unusual double rehal, in this case used for studying

== See also ==
- Bible box
- Bible case
