= Military campaign =

Long-term military strategy plan within a war

A military campaign is large-scale long-duration significant military strategy plan incorporating a series of interrelated military operations or battles forming a distinct part of a larger conflict often called a war.

== Definition ==
A military campaign denotes the time during which a given military force conducts combat operations in a given area (often referred to as AO, area of operation). A military campaign may be executed by either a single Armed Service, or as a combined services campaign conducted by land, naval, air, cyber, and space forces.

The purpose of a military campaign is to achieve a particular desired resolution of a military conflict as its strategic goal. This is constrained by resources, geography and/or season. A campaign is measured relative to the technology used by the belligerents to achieve goals, and while in the pre-industrial Europe was understood to be that between the planting (late spring) and harvest times (late autumn), it has been shortened during the post-industrial period to a few weeks. However, due to the nature of campaign goals, usually campaigns last several months, or up to a year as defined by Trevor N. Dupuy.

"A campaign is a phase of a war involving a series of operations related in time and space and aimed towards a single, specific, strategic objective or result in the war. A campaign may include a single battle, but more often it comprises a number of battles over a protracted period of time or a considerable distance, but within a single theatre of operations or delimited area. A campaign may last only a few weeks, but usually lasts several months or even a year".

== Conduct ==
- Planning – the General Staff defining objectives, time, scope and cost of the campaign
- Executing – the coordination of forces and resources in logistic and combat operations
- Controlling – the monitoring of the progress of the campaign when compared to its baseline plan
- Concluding – acceptance or rejection of the campaign outcomes by the directing command structure

== Winter season ==
In premodern times, campaigns were usually interrupted during the winter season, during which the soldiers retreated into the winter quarters (or 'cantonments') to get through the coldest months with warmth and protection. For example, the ancient Romans had easily movable castra aestiva ('summer quarters', with leather tents) but more stationary castra hibera ('winter quarters', with wooden barracks). In favourable weather and with proper equipment and supplies, however, military campaigns could be extended from the 'campaigning season' into winter in an attempt to catch the enemy off-guard. For example, in the Flanders campaign, French general Jean-Charles Pichegru unexpectedly crossed the frozen Great Rivers during the harsh winter of 1794–95, and conquered the Dutch Republic. But ill-prepared winter campaigns often had disastrous consequences due to high mortality amongst the soldiers; the most notorious example of this is the French invasion of Russia by Napoleon (24 June – 14 December 1812). Therefore, army commanders sought to take into account the need to return their troops to their winter quarters, or establish new winter quarters in a secure location, well before the winter set in, so as to not leave their soldiers vulnerable to the enemy nor the elements.

== Evaluation ==
The success of a military campaign is evaluated based on the degree of achievement of planned goals and objectives through combat and noncombat operations. That is determined when one of the belligerent military forces defeats the opposing military force within the constraints of the planned resource, time and cost allocations. The manner in which a force terminates its operations often influences the public perception of the campaign's success. A campaign may end in conquest, and be followed by the transition of military authority to a civil authority and the redeployment of forces, or a permanent installation of a military authority in the occupied area.

Military campaigns, inside and outside defined wars, may exceed the original or even revised planning parameters of scope, time and cost. Such stalled campaigns, for example the western front in World War I, were formerly called "stalemates" but in the late 20th century the metaphor of a quagmire was often applied, and "frozen conflict" in the 21st. Such a situation may arise of various factors such as:

- a small hope for victory
- poorly defined objectives
- no clear exit strategy

== See also ==
General

- Military operations other than war – concept that encompass the use of military capabilities across the range of military operations short of war.
- Campaign desk – used by officers and their staffs in rear areas during a military campaign.
- Military strategy – collective name for planning the conduct of warfare.
- War cycles – the theory that wars happen in cycles.

Military decorations

- Campaign medal – a military decoration which is awarded to a member of the military who serves in a designated military operation or performs duty in a geographical theater.
- Campaign clasp – an attachment to a military award consisting of a metal bar which is pinned to the upper cloth portion of an award medal.
- Campaign streamer – a long streamer attached to the headpiece of a military flag, denoting participation of that military service in a particular campaign.

Lists and examples

- List of wars – contains military campaigns.
- List of battles – part of larger military campaigns.
- List of sieges – part of larger military campaigns.
