= Lap desk =

Portable writing surface

The lap desk is a desk set in the lap. In the European tradition, it can be considered a modern form of the portable desk.

== Antique lap desk ==
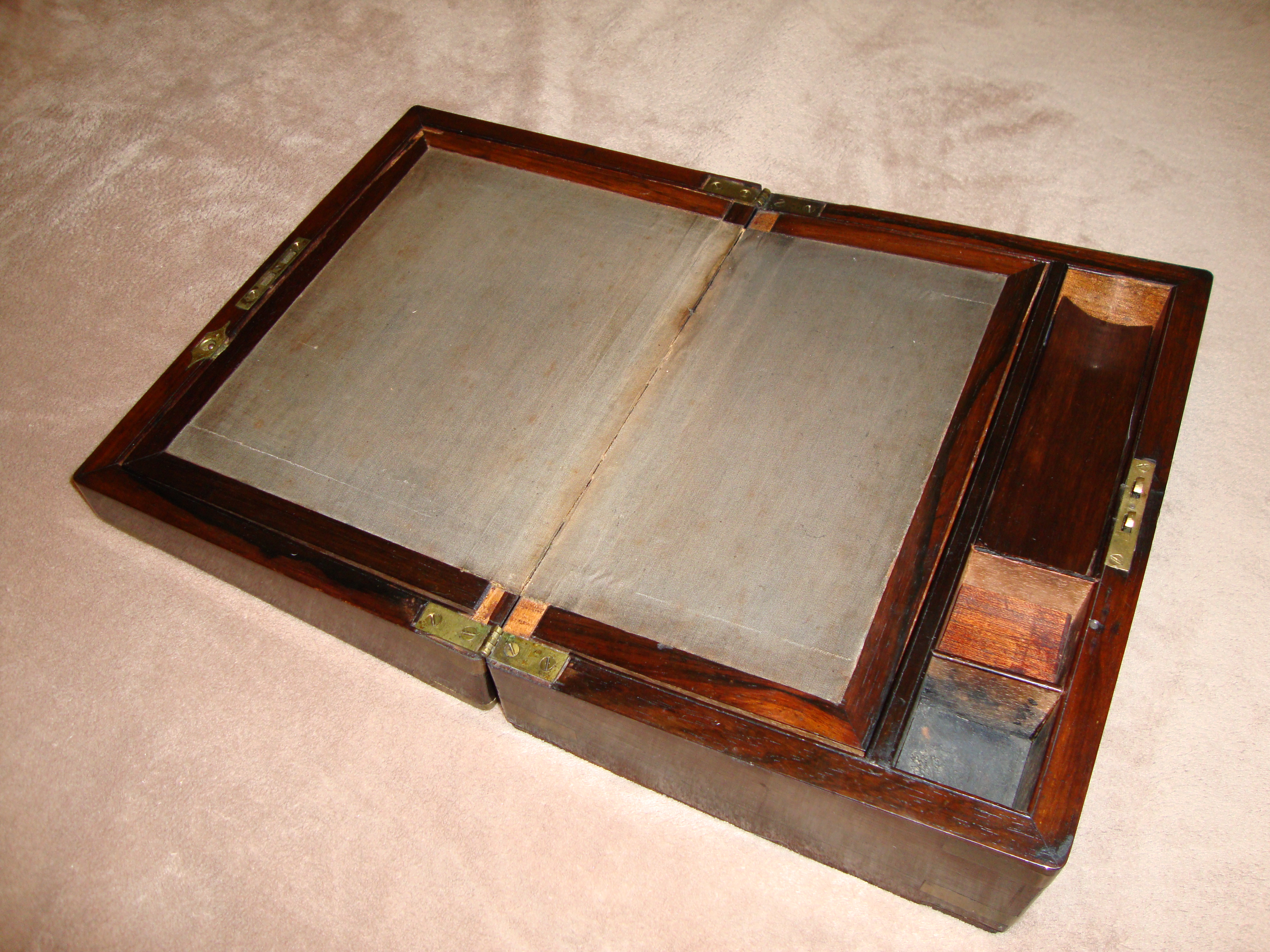
An antique lap desk

As an antique the lap desk is a smaller variant of the writing slope. It is also called a writing box, writing desk, or writing cabinet. In certain instances it is known as a portable desk, a term which is usually applied to larger forms. Most antique lap desks are meant to be used on a table or some other stable surface. They are often strongly built of fine hardwoods like mahogany or walnut.

Antique lap desks had hinged writing surfaces, often covered in leather, felt, or other material, that flip up to reveal storage space for papers. Individual compartments were designed to hold inkwells, pens, sealing wax, and other contemporary writing materials. Some desks also had concealed storage compartments.

== Modern lap desk ==
As a modern form the lap desk is meant primarily for use in bed and other similar circumstances, it is also known as a bed desk. There are a wide variety of forms available, but as a rule it is much smaller and simpler than the antique lap desk, having at the most a small drawer or holding area for a ballpoint pen and a pencil. It is also made of much cheaper materials, save for a few craft productions.

Certain lap desks have a removable monopod, which makes them collapsible cousins to the lectern desk. Others have two short collapsible legs, so that they can be used both in bed and on a lap, when the legs are folded. Finally, some come with a built-in battery powered lamp, continuing the tradition of those antique lap desks and writing slopes which had swinging or hinged brass candle holders built in. Some new lap desks now have a built-in cup holder.

Most modern lap desks are considered specialty items and very few furniture dealers keep them in stock. They are present, however, in a large number of catalogs and on some commercial Web sites.

There are also lap desks made for laptop computers. These desks were designed not only to raise the laptops from their surrounding environments (such as beds), but they were also designed to provide extra clearances to provide adequate air circulation to the laptops. Some of them are also equipped with extra fans to increase air circulation.

== See also ==
- List of desk forms and types
- Pilot's kneeboard
