= Portable desk =

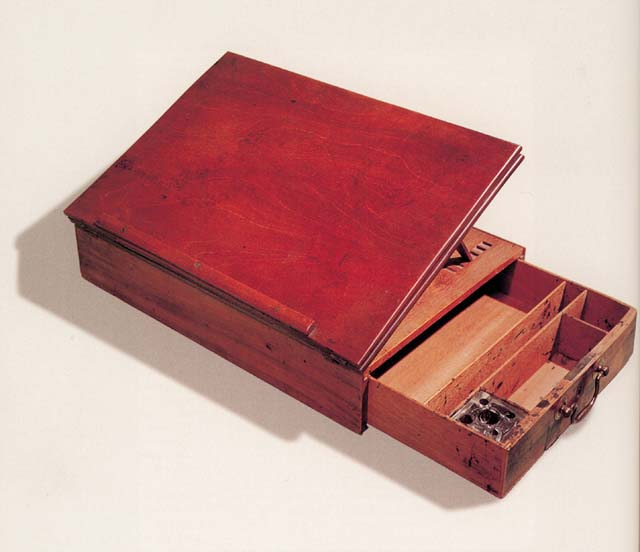
Benjamin Randolph after a design by Thomas Jefferson. Portable writing desk, Philadelphia, 1776.

The portable desk had many forms and is an ancestor of the portable computer, the modern laptop an atavistic grandchild of the 19th-century lap desk.

== Medieval era and Renaissance ==
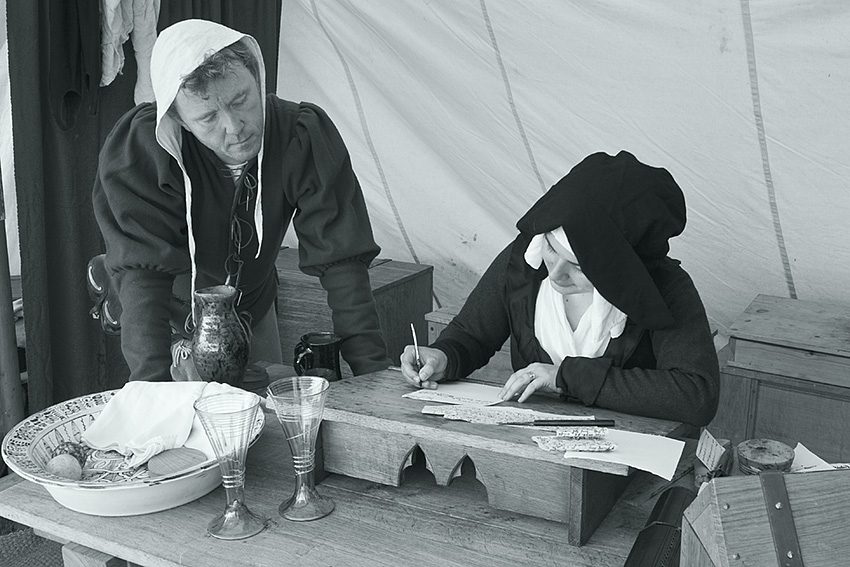

All desks were portable to some extent, from medieval times to the end of the Renaissance, with the exception of built-in tables and inclined ranks of desks found in places such as the scriptorium or library of a monastery. This was due to the itinerant nature of medieval kingship and the similar conditions that prevailed in lesser administrations under dukes or counts. There was rarely a single capital for a kingdom, and the monarch and his (or her) court would travel periodically between several seats of power during the year, taking precious goods and much of their furniture with them. A good example of this is Henry VIII's writing desk. The traditional French words for furniture – le mobilier and les meubles – reflect this. They describe those goods that are "mobile", in contrast to those that are not: les immeubles, that is, buildings.

The desks in medieval woodcuts and other illustrations of the period were massive affairs, but could be hauled by several men. Some were made of pieces that could be knocked down for transport. The trestle desk was a common form for the period. It was usually fitted with a slanted top.

In the homes of lesser nobles and certain members of the merchant classes the portable furniture never travelled very far. Most domestic life took place in a single large hall. Furniture was constantly shifted around, stored and often disassembled to suit the role the great room was playing at a particular time in the day or the month.

== Varguenos, bible boxes and other chests ==
There are two survivors of these medieval and renaissance forms: the rather large Bargueño desk or Vargueno, a chest desk from 16th-century Spain, and the relatively small Bible box, which probably had a later origin. These two forms are usually not employed as portable desks any more, but they are bought and sold as antiques or as reproductions and usually valued as much for their monetary worth or their aesthetic appeal as for their practical use.

The lap desk appeared sometime in the 17th century and became a stylish accessory for travelling gentlemen. Like the Bible box, the lap desk was usually small enough to be carried on a horse or by a gentleman's butler or valet. From the 18th century onward, however, it grew in size and became too heavy to be used comfortably on a lap. Several regional variations, such as the French escritoire, were developed.

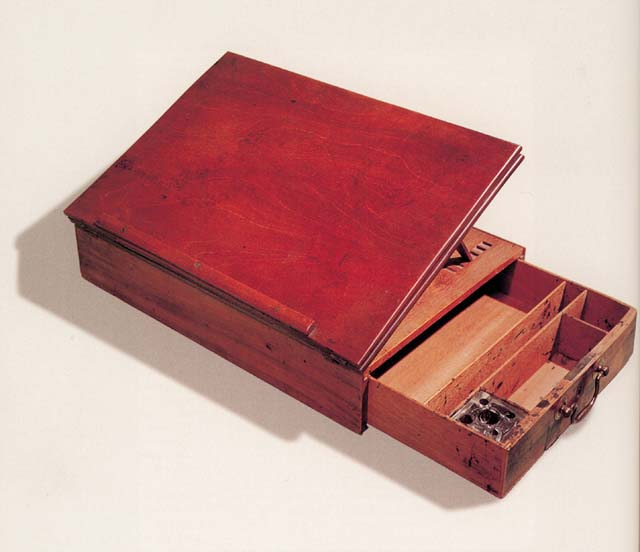
Lap desk on which Thomas Jefferson drafted the U.S. Declaration of Independence.

At the other end of the scale, the 17th century saw the appearance of several other kinds of "chest" desks, such as those destined for use in ships or for getting paperwork done during a military campaign. These were usually known as the campaign desk and the field desk.

== Decline ==
Most portable desks gradually disappeared during the 19th century, as useful day-to-day writing tools. The introduction of mass literacy during that period, the invention of cheaper and more efficient writing implements, and the mass production of furniture made most portable desks redundant.

With the advent of clean writing surfaces in every home or place of business and of the small and clean pocket fountain pen and the pencil, a gentleman did not need to include a lap desk in his luggage. There was no need for a container for the quill, the blotter, and the sand tray or for the writing surface this container could offer. Ships eventually were constructed with built-in desks, making the portable desk obsolete in maritime environments.

The only modern survivors of all the antique forms of the portable desk are the bed variants of the lap desk and a series of standardized forms (following NATO specifications or others) of the field desk.

== See also ==
- Bible box, a portable desk specifically for holding a Bible
- List of desk forms and types
