= Cajun Pawn Stars =

American reality television series

- Genre: Reality
- Starring: Jimmie DeRamus; Peggy DeRamus; Tammie DeRamus-Credeur
- Country of origin: United States
- Original language: English
- No. of seasons: 4
- No. of episodes: 52 (list of episodes)

Production
- Executive producers: Brent Montgomery; David George; Joel Patterson; Mary Donahue; Paul Cabana
- Running time: 23 minutes
- Production company: Leftfield Pictures

Original release
- Network: History
- Release: January 8, 2012 – January 10, 2013

Cajun Pawn Stars is an American reality television series on the History Channel that debuted January 8, 2012, at 10 pm ET.

The show was the second spin-off of Pawn Stars, but unlike fellow spin-offs American Restoration and Counting Cars, it is entirely unrelated to the venue and staff of Pawn Stars.

Following its fourth and final season in 2013, the show was quietly cancelled due to contract disputes with Leftfield Pictures.

== Synopsis ==
Cajun Pawn Stars revolves around another family-owned pawn shop, the Silver Dollar Pawn & Jewelry Center in Alexandria, Louisiana, which is owned by Jimmie "Big Daddy" DeRamus (died of cancer July 13, 2023), who ran the store along with his wife Peggy and daughter Tammie. The shop claims to have over 100,000 items within its 20,000 square foot showroom.

The show's format is similar to the original Pawn Stars, as it features an array of collectible, antique and unusual items that people sell or pawn, complemented with "pop-up" facts related to the item. Also, as with the original series, the shop sometimes consults an expert to give an appraisal/opinion on the item being sold or pawned. In addition, at the second commercial break, a trivia question is asked in relation to the shop or item, as with Pawn Stars.

On their Facebook page, the shop liquidated all its items and closed permanently in 2026.

== Episodes ==
Season	Episodes	Season premiere	Season finale
1	8	January 8, 2012	February 6, 2012
2	17	June 4, 2012	August 1, 2012
3	20	September 12, 2012	December 12, 2012
4	7	December 26, 2012	January 10, 2013
