= Credenza =

Dining room sideboard cupboard

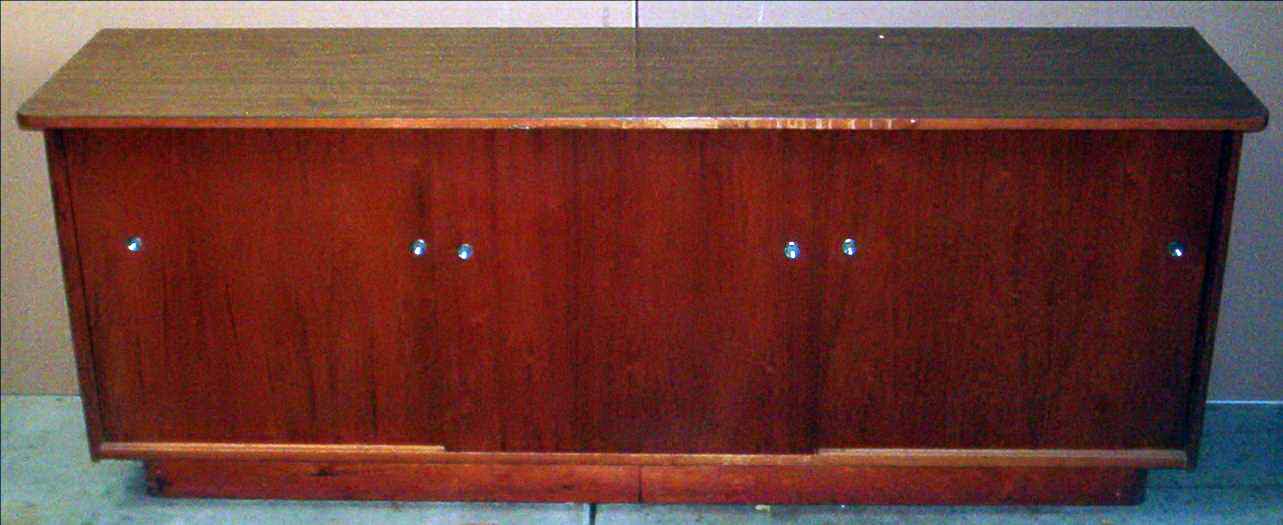
1950s-style credenza

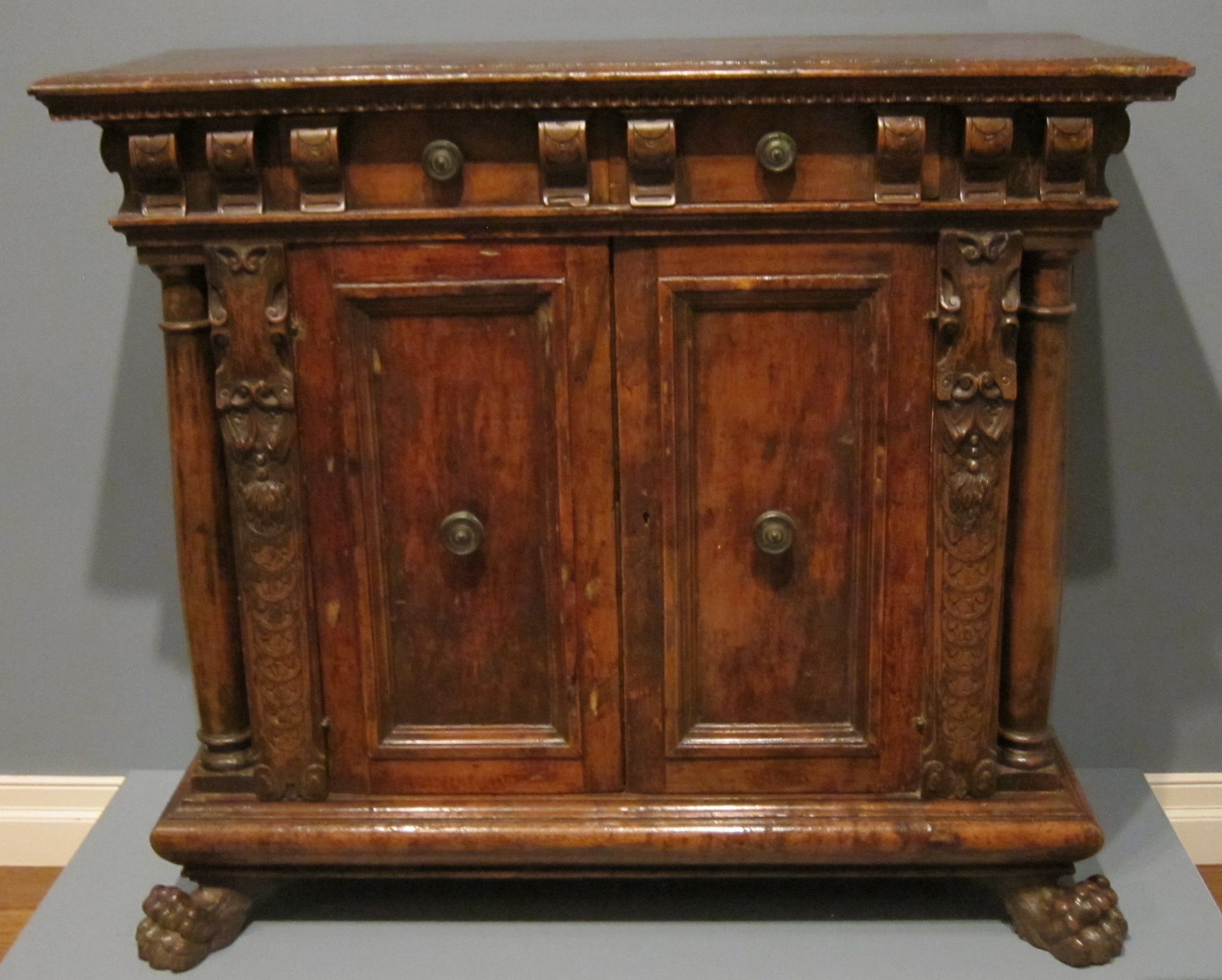
15th- or 16th-century Italian credenza

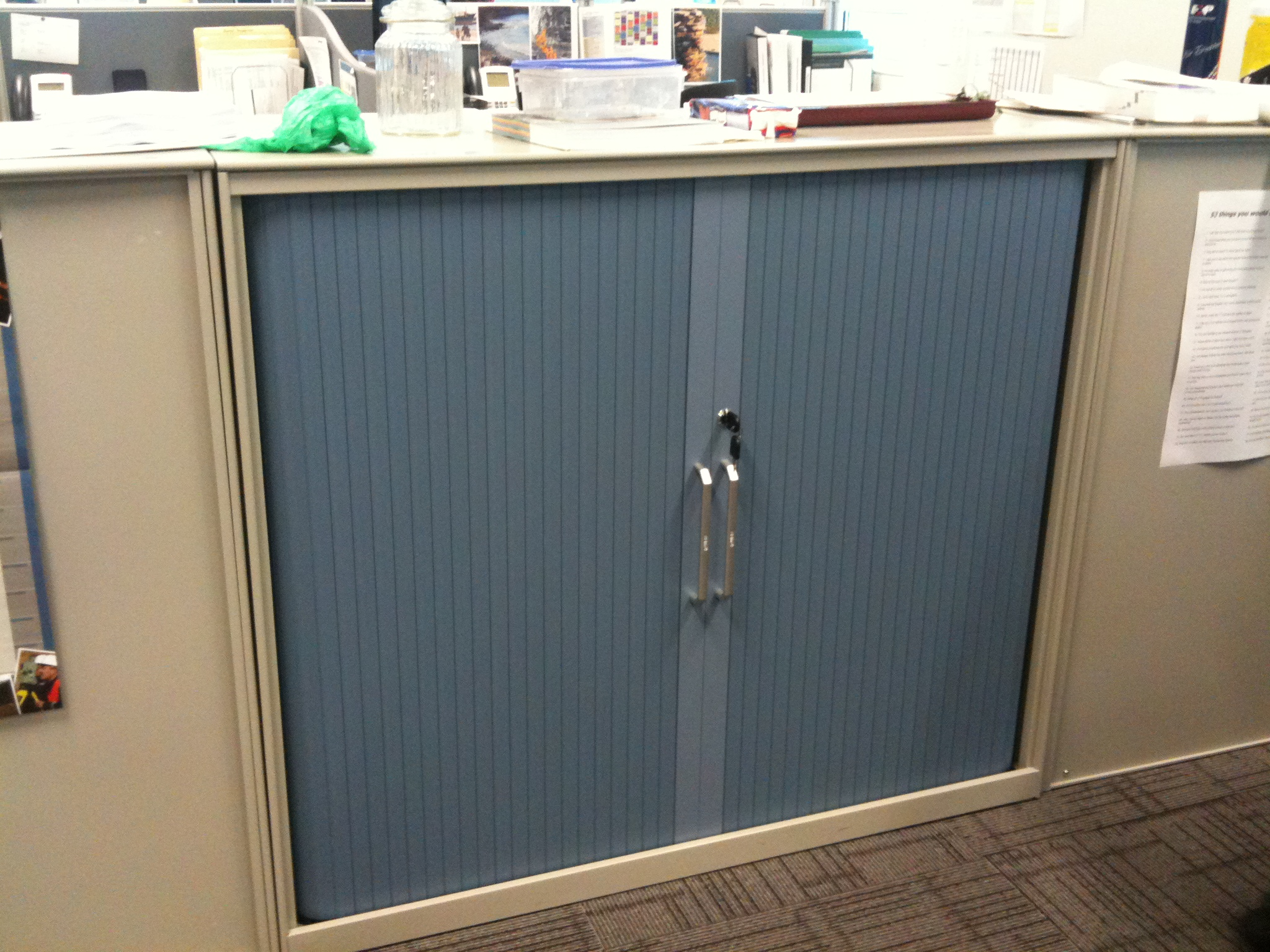
Modern built-in or fitted credenza

A credenza is a dining room sideboard or display cabinet, usually made of burnished and polished wood and decorated with marquetry. The top would often be made of marble, or another decorative liquid- and heat-resistant stone.

The credenza started as a rough table with a cloth draped over it. In early 14th-century Italy, it took on an architectural form with column and pilaster decorations.

In modern times, a credenza is more often a type of sideboard used in the home or restaurant. In dining rooms, it is typically made from wood and used as a platform to serve buffet meals. In restaurant kitchens, made from stainless steel, it provides a side surface and storage cupboards. It can also be used to refer to office storage; both above and below a desk space.

== Etymology ==
Originally in Italian the name meant belief or trust (etymologically connected to the English word "credence"). In the 16th century, the act of credenza was the tasting of food and drinks by a servant for a lord or other important person (such as the pope or a cardinal) in order to test for poison. The name may have passed then to the room where the act took place, then to the furniture.

== See also ==
- Credenza desk
- Credence table
- Salver
