= Lectern desk =

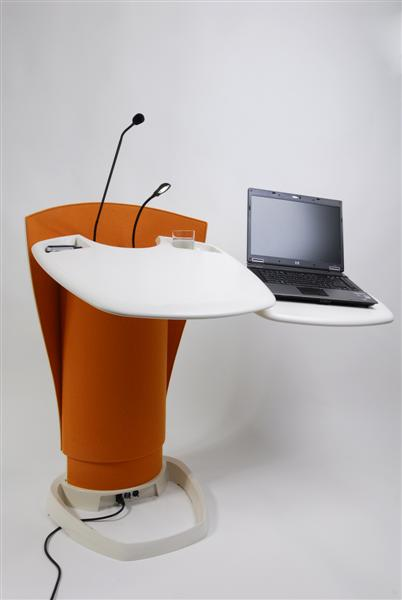
A modern lectern.

The lectern desk exists in two distinct forms, antique and modern.

== Antique lectern desk ==
The antique is basically a lectern fitted with the conveniences needed to make writing easy, such as room for paper and writing implements. In a sense, it is a specialised and rarer form of standing desk. The term is sometimes used for large standing desks.

Because the antique lectern desk is smaller than most kinds of standing desks, it is suitable for writing in cramped quarters, in a residence or at a workplace. Most lectern desks have a slanted top with a lip, to keep pens and paper from sliding down.

Lectern desks can sometimes be found in churches.

== Modern lectern desk ==
A rolling computer desk based on a single leg set on a four- or five-wheel stand is the most common modern form of lectern desk. It is usually sold directly by manufacturers or by catalog and online. It targets several distinct specialty markets such as hospitals and industrial plants.

== See also ==
- Standing desk
- List of desk forms and types
