= Computer desk =

Furniture for computer users

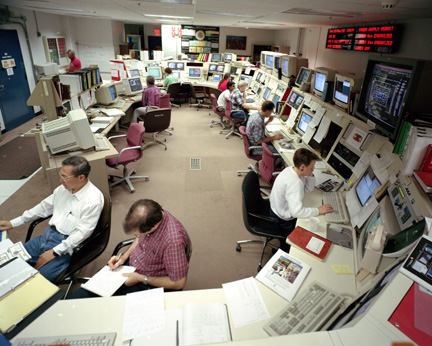
Computer desks in a Fermilab control room

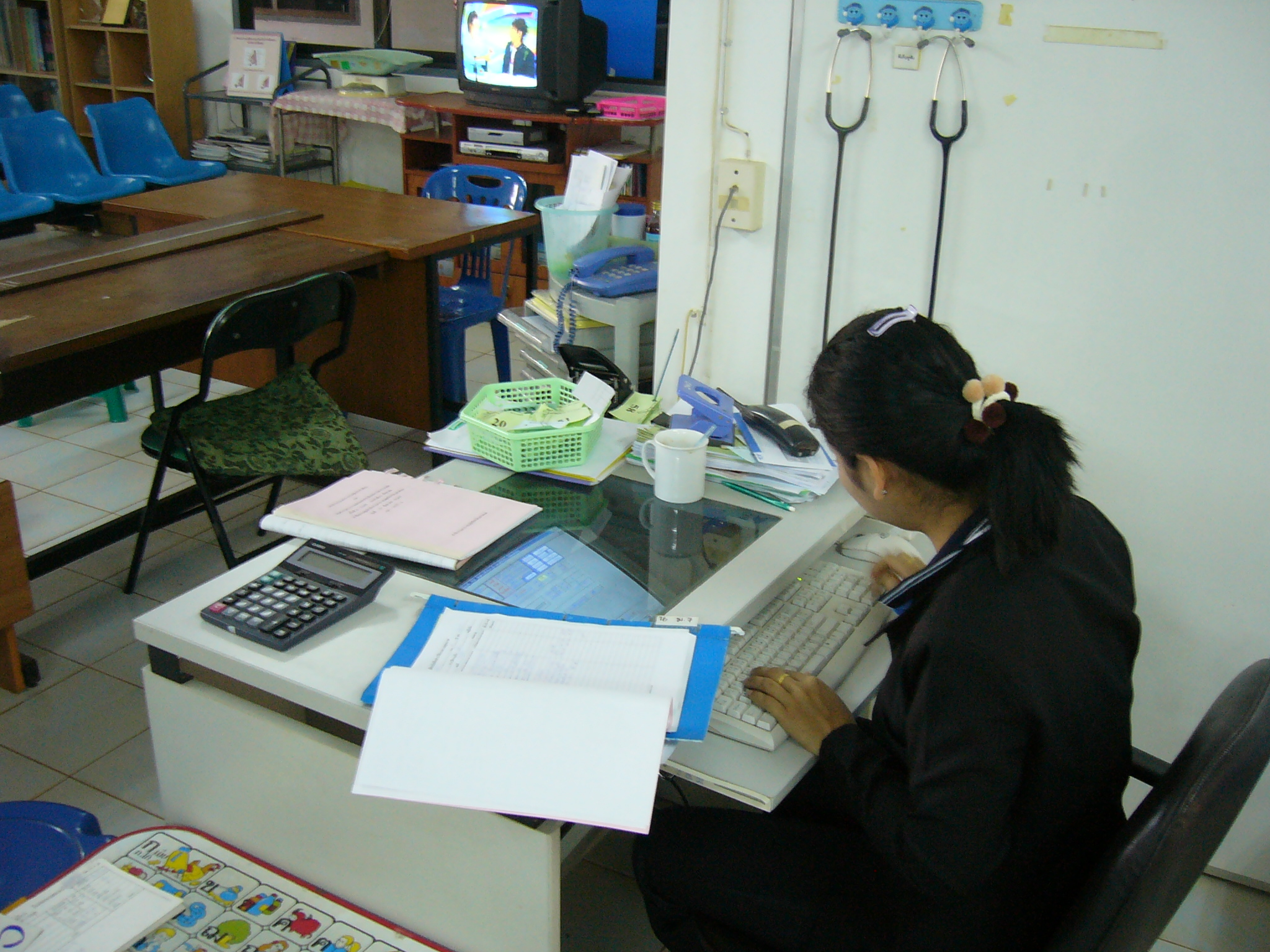
An uncommon office computer desk with the screen under the top

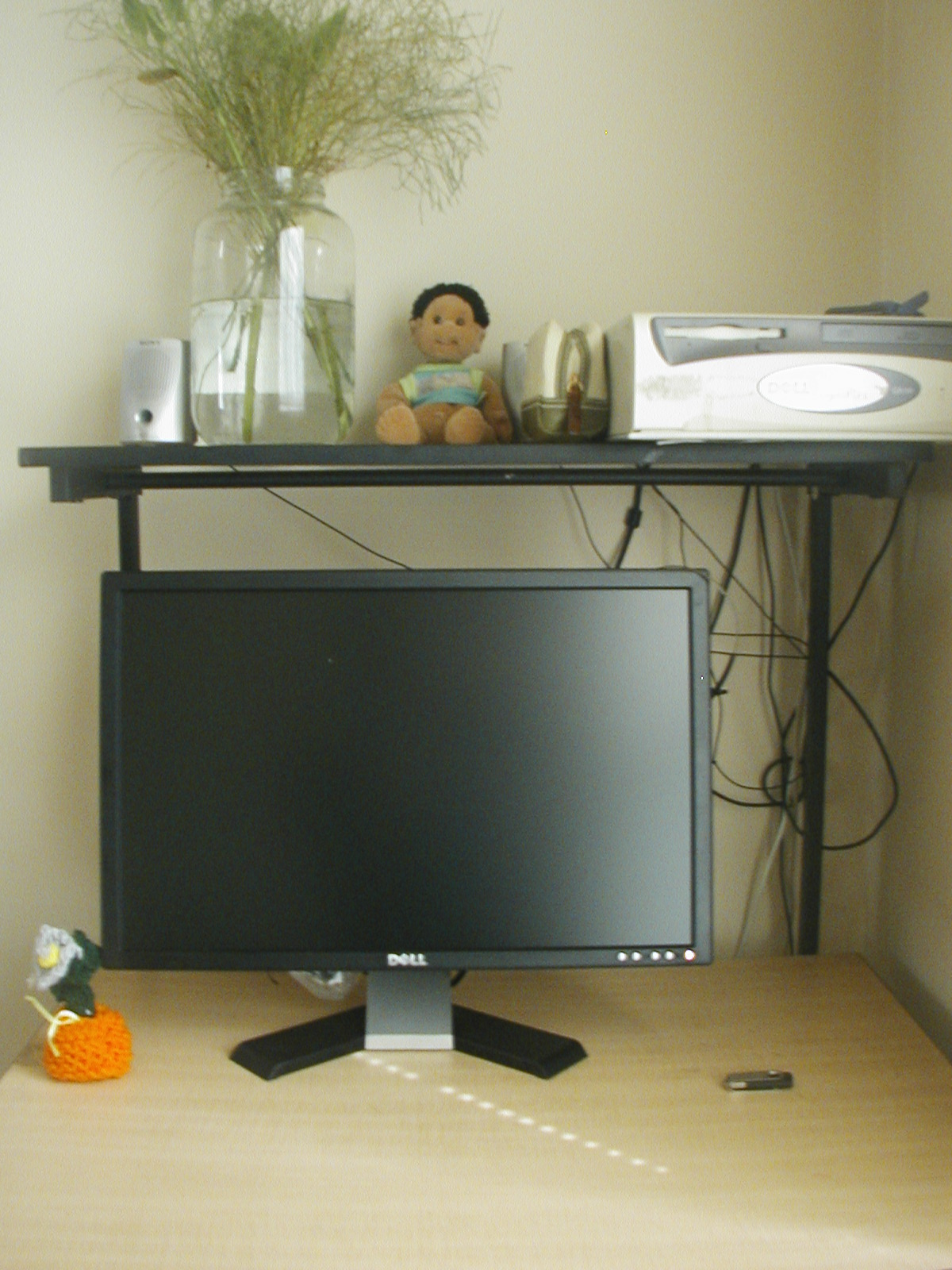
The top of a typical home computer desk

The computer desk and related ergonomic desk are furniture pieces designed to comfortably and aesthetically provide a working surface and house or conceal office equipment including computers, peripherals and cabling for office and home-office users.

== Computer desk ==
The most common form of the computer desk is an ergonomic variant of the office desk, which has an adjustable keyboard tray and sufficient desktop space for handwriting. Provisions for a monitor shelf and holes for routing cables are integrated in the design, making it easier to connect the computer components together. The typical armoire desk provides space for a keyboard, mouse, monitor, printer and speakers. Cubicle desk designs for business and government workplaces include a range of shelves, trays and cable-routing holes for computer systems. In some computer desks, the cabling is affixed to the modesty panel at the back of the desk, to create a neater appearance.

There are a great variety of computer desk shapes and forms. Large multiple student computer desks configured in rows are designed to house dozens of computer systems while facilitating wiring, general maintenance, theft prevention and vandalism reduction. Small rolling lectern desks or computer carts with tiny desktops provide just enough room for a laptop computer and a mouse pad. Computer desks are typically mass-produced and require some self-assembly.

The computer itself is normally separate from the desk, which is designed to hold a typically sized computer, monitor and accessories. Cabling must be routed through the channels and access openings by the user or installer. A small number of computers are built within a desk made specially for them, like the British i-desk. Various proposals for the "Office of the future" suggested other integrated designs, but these have not been taken up.

A rolling chair table configuration offers mobility and improved access in situations where a desk is not convenient. Gyratory computer tables can be used over a bed. Modular computer tables separate user interface elements from the computing and network connection, allowing more placement flexibility. The modules are connected via wireless technology.

== Ergonomic desk ==
The ergonomic desk is a modern desk form which, like the adjustable drawing table or drafting table, offers mechanical adjustments for the placement of its elements in order to maximize user comfort and efficiency. The ergonomic desk is usually a "stand-alone" piece of furniture allowing access to the adjustment mechanisms. Some ergonomic desks have a sufficiently large desktop height adjustment to create either a common "sit-down" desk or a less common standing desk, which allows the user to work while standing. The ergonomic desk is usually a close companion to the ergonomic chair.

The ergonomic desk originated with the beginning of the field of human factors or ergonomics after World War II. Legislation stating minimal requirements for furniture used by office workers referred to ergonomic desk standards.

The desk area should be deep enough to accommodate a monitor placed at least 20 inches away from your eyes.

== Health and safety ==
Diagram modeling a positioning scheme for seating, viewing, and hand placement

Some research has indicated that the placement of computer desks in an office environment can influence workers' happiness and productivity. Having an appropriate chair increases comfort and can reduce work-related injuries and pain from ergonomic hazards.

== See also ==
- List of desk forms and types
