= Henry VIII's writing desk =

Portable desk made for Henry VIII

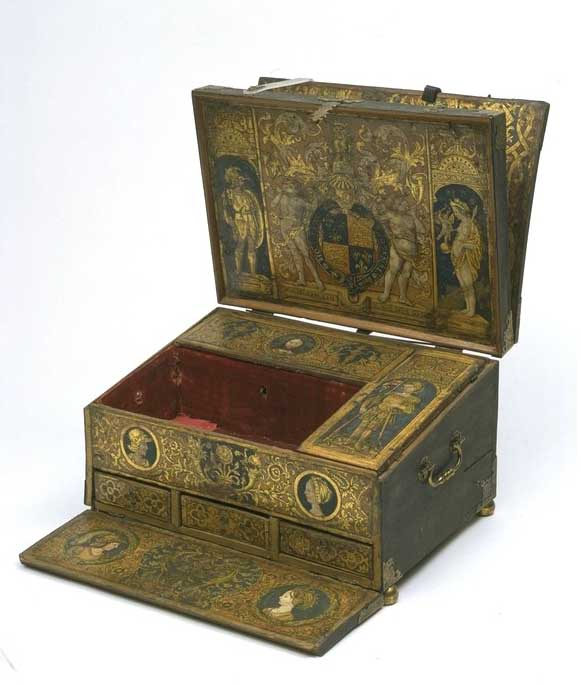
Henry VIII's writing desk, about 1525 V&A Museum no. W.29:1 to 9-1932

Henry VIII's writing desk is a portable writing desk, made in about 1525–26 for Henry VIII, and now in the Victoria and Albert Museum.

The desk is a product of the royal workshops and is lavishly embellished with ornamental motifs introduced to the Kingdom of England by continental artists. The gilded leather lining is painted with figures and profile heads that are close in style to contemporary portrait miniatures, while the figures of Mars in armour and Venus with cupid are taken from woodcuts by the German artist Hans Burgkmair (1473–1531), which were published in 1510. The desk also bears the coat of arms and personal badges of Henry and his first queen Catherine of Aragon. Such images conveyed powerful messages of allegiance and were used extensively in the decorative schemes of Henry VIII's royal palaces. The Latin inscription on the inner lid reads "God of Kingdoms great Protector of the authority of the Christian Church give to your servant Henry VIII King of England a great victory over his enemies".

The exterior of the desk is covered with shagreen (possibly sharkskin) and fitted with metal-gilt angle-mounts, loop handles and ball feet, all added during the 18th century. The interior surfaces of the compartments are lined with red silk velvet, probably added during the 19th century. The writing surface and the large compartment have been relined very crudely with a crimson silk velvet, the appearance of which is considerably older than that of the red velvet.

== See also ==
- Bureau du Roi
- Resolute desk, President of the United States

== Bibliography ==
- Jackson, Anna, ed. (2001). V&A: A Hundred Highlights. V&A Publications.
