= Bible case =

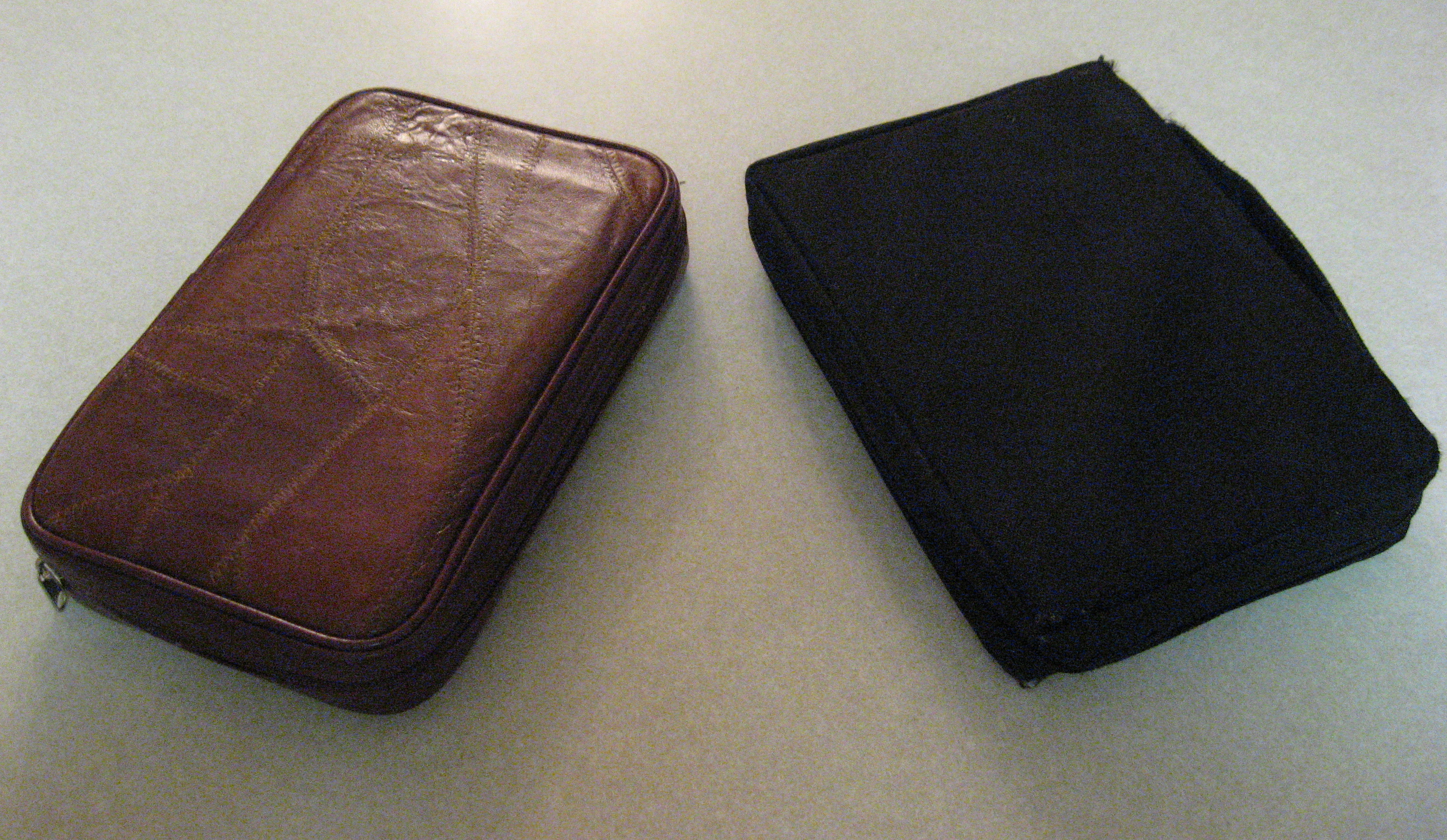
Bible cases made from leather (left) and synthetic fabric (right).

A Bible case is a small, generally rectangular shaped bag, the primary purpose of which is to protect the owner's Bible from damage and also to allow the owner to easily identify their bible from others. They are made from a number of different materials, amongst the most popular being, leather, denim and suede. Most are fastened with a zip although some may use snap fasteners. The cases are generally only slightly larger than the bibles themselves and are therefore available in many different sizes.

It is not unusual to see decoration on bible cases such as pictures or bright colours. Some cases have handles on them in a similar style to briefcases. Further personalisation can be made by adding the owners name or a bible quote. Many cases have several compartments or zipped sections in which to store useful items that are bible related such a hymn book, note pad or pen.

The historical forebear of the bible case is the bible box, which is still in use although on a smaller scale than bible cases. The advantage of the case is that it is cheaper and more portable, whilst boxes offer more protection and lessen the chance of bibles, especially more expensive ones, being lost.

== See also ==
- Rehal
