= Modesty panel =

Addition to furniture or clothing

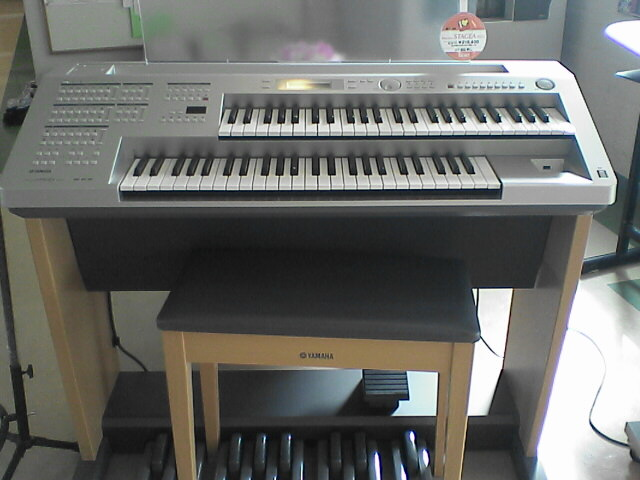
An ELB organ with a modesty panel.

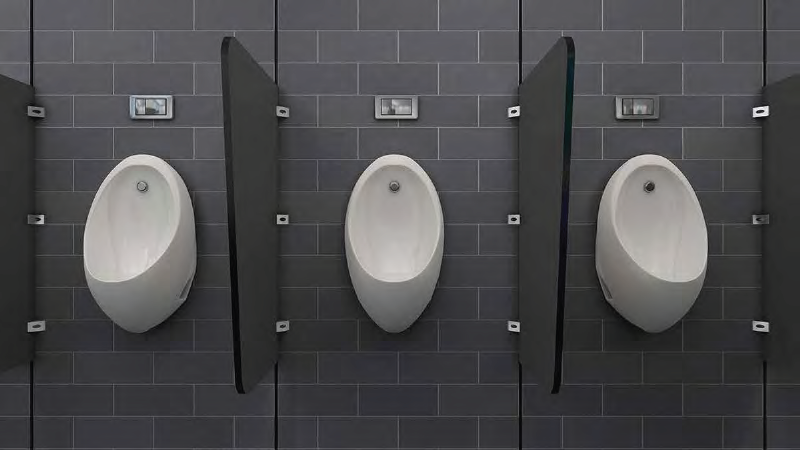
Urinals with modesty panels

A modesty panel is something added to various items such as clothes or furniture for the purpose of concealment. In particular, it refers to a thin board of wood or metal that is attached to the front of a desk, drafting table, electronic organ, or similar item, to shield legs, ankles, or feet from view. This is also known as a modesty board.

== Furniture ==
The panel provides privacy for the person seated at the desk or organ, as it covers the upper part of the legs. This privacy role is particularly useful in cases where the desk or organ is positioned in front of a class or hall. The modesty panel may also provide structural support for the four legs of the desk or organ; it may also be used as a place for affixing electric cabling, computer cabling, or electrical extension boxes. A modesty panel is a partition often attached to a news desk to cover a news anchor's legs.

Early modesty panels were often used in Quaker meeting houses and other churches of the eighteenth and nineteenth centuries, growing in popularity during the Victorian era. Modesty panels might be found running up the sides of stairways to discourage passers-by from looking up dresses. They were also added to the sides of church organs, shielding the musician's feet and legs from the congregation's view as she played the organ's pedals. Later, as women entered the secretarial force in large numbers during the twentieth century, modesty panels were added to office desks.

== Clothing ==
Modesty panels may cover the cleavage of a bust or the crotch, in particular providing a moisture-proof barrier under a skirt. It has also been used for a skirt fitted as part of a woman's swimsuit.
