= Bible box =

Container used to store a copy of the Bible

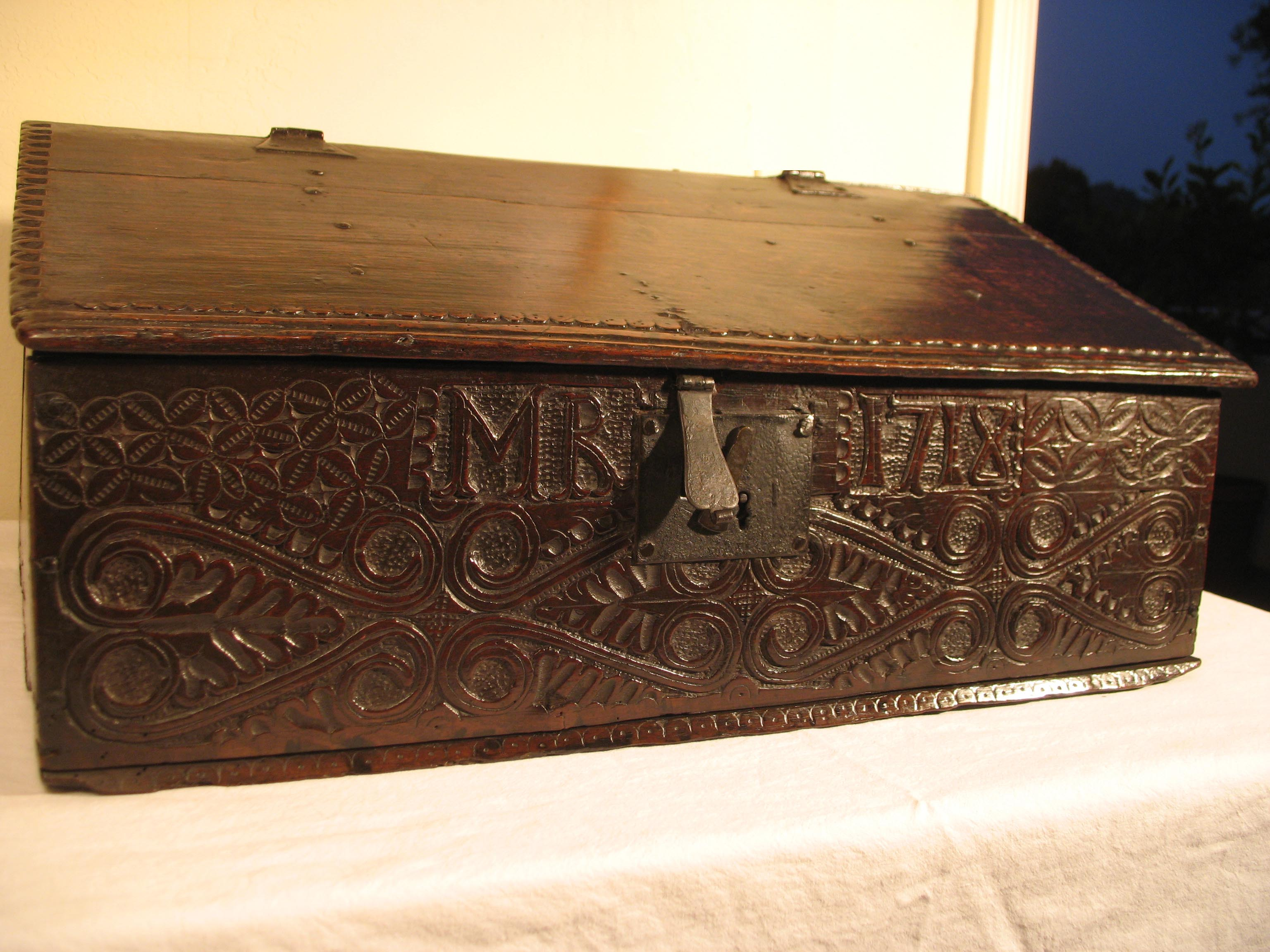
English slope-lidded Bible box 1718

A Bible box is a small container that is used to store a bible. About the size of a bible, this box could be used to transport in safety what was a very costly book. Many varieties had a slanted or angled top with a lower lip, meant to hold the Bible for reading when the box was placed on a table. In a sense it then served as a portable lectern. Over the years the typical Bible box was also used or specifically built to contain writing implements such as a quill, ink pot, blotting paper and writing paper. The level or slanted surface of the box then served as a desktop for writing as well as reading.

In much of Europe this kind of box was produced in many different materials, such as wood, metal or ceramics, in simple or extremely ornate styles. Bible boxes were popular in the 17th century. Many of the more refined examples can be found in museums.

In Colonial America, this container was produced locally in a great variety of styles and finishes, by amateurs and professionals.

The term "Bible box" is sometimes wrongly used in the United States to qualify antique objects which are in fact simple portable desks with no biblical connection. A more modern, cheaper and more portable version of the bible box is the bible case.

== See also ==
- Bible case
- List of desk forms and types
