= Armoire desk =

Piece of furniture

An armoire desk is a writing-table built within a large cabinet, usually 1.5–2.0 metres (5–7 feet) high. The cabinet is closed by two to four full-height doors, to keep out dust or to give a tidy appearance to a room by hiding the cluttered working surface of the desk. This form of desk is usually placed against a wall, like its antique uncle, the secretary desk.

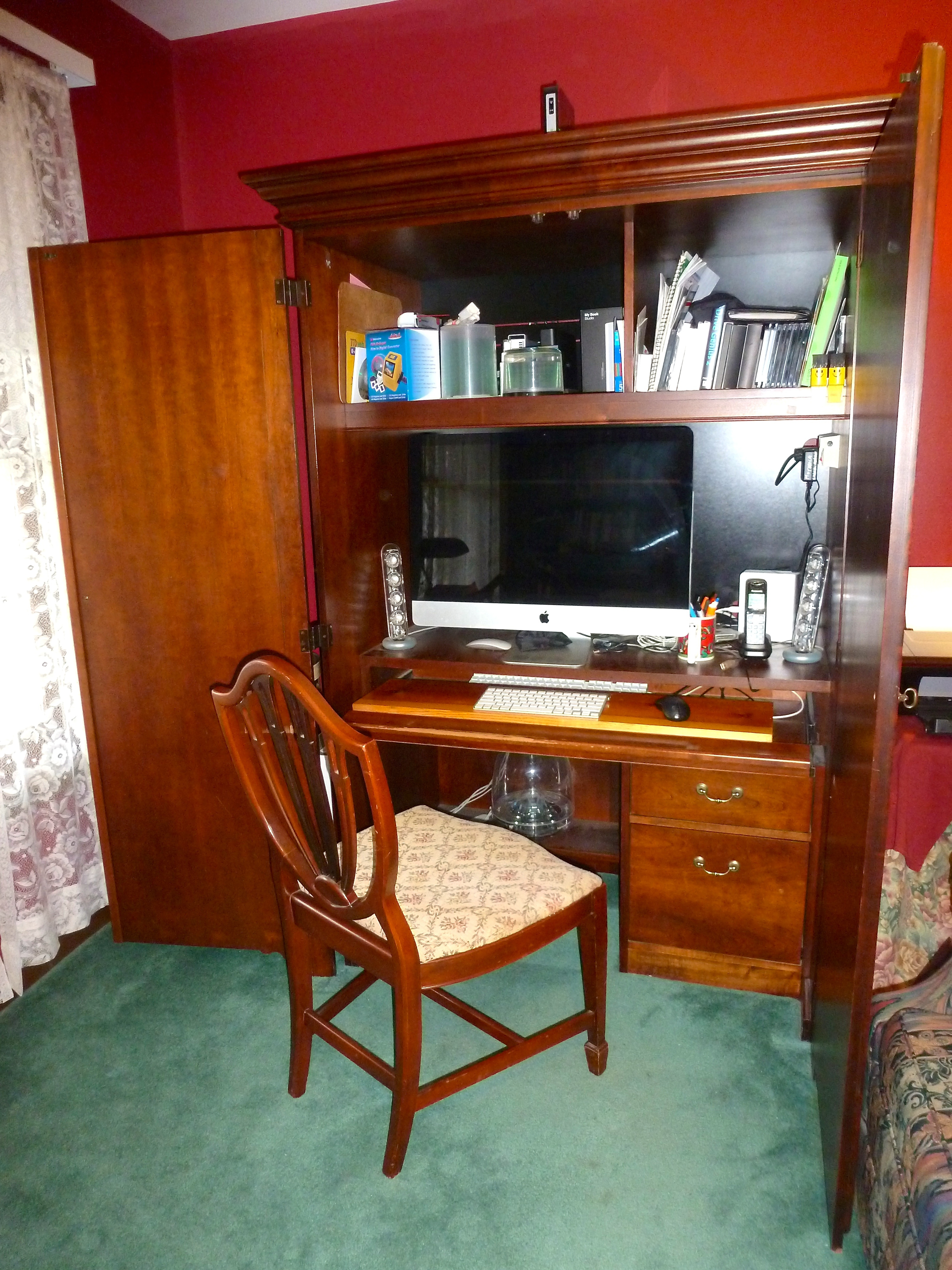
Computer armoire desk

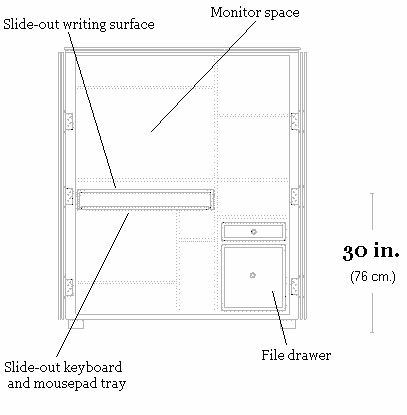

Small or home offices are the usual habitat of the modern armoire desk. Corporations and government bureaucracies typically shun the armoire desk, preferring pedestal desks and cubicles in most instances. The closest ancestor, in form, of the armoire desk, is the Moore desk.

The armoire desk is often called a "computer armoire desk", or a computer desk, since it is used in present times to house a computer and its peripherals. Holes are provided to connect the peripherals located in several nooks above or below the main work surface. Often, the work surface or surfaces, such as a writing area or a computer keyboard tray are adjustable to provide an ergonomically sound working environment.

Some armoire desks have a fixed work surface, which stays in place when the doors are closed, and moves only for ergonomic adjustments. This kind of armoire desk is a direct descendant of the antique rolltop desk which was common in corporate or government offices three or four generations ago, since it provides a fast and efficient way to store or hide current work.

Other armoire desks have an easily movable, often hinged, work surface which must be cleared of documents and other items in order to close the doors. This kind of armoire desk is a morphological descendant of the famous Wooton desk by its size and by the necessity to constantly store papers to shut it. There is also the alternative of always leaving it open, given the trouble involved. The fall front desk or "secrétaire à abattant", and the slant top desk are also related.

Unlike all of these earlier relations, however, the modern armoire desk usually does not have a lock. Armoire desks are normally very practical pieces of furniture, despite the use of rich veneers and very complex exterior styling in some of the costlier models.

Modern variations of the armoire desk include slide-out surface(s) for a computer keyboard and mouse pad. Working height is also increased an inch, from 29 inches (73.5 cm) off the floor to 30 inches (76 cm).

== See also ==
- List of desk forms and types
