= Desk =

Type of table often used in a school or office setting

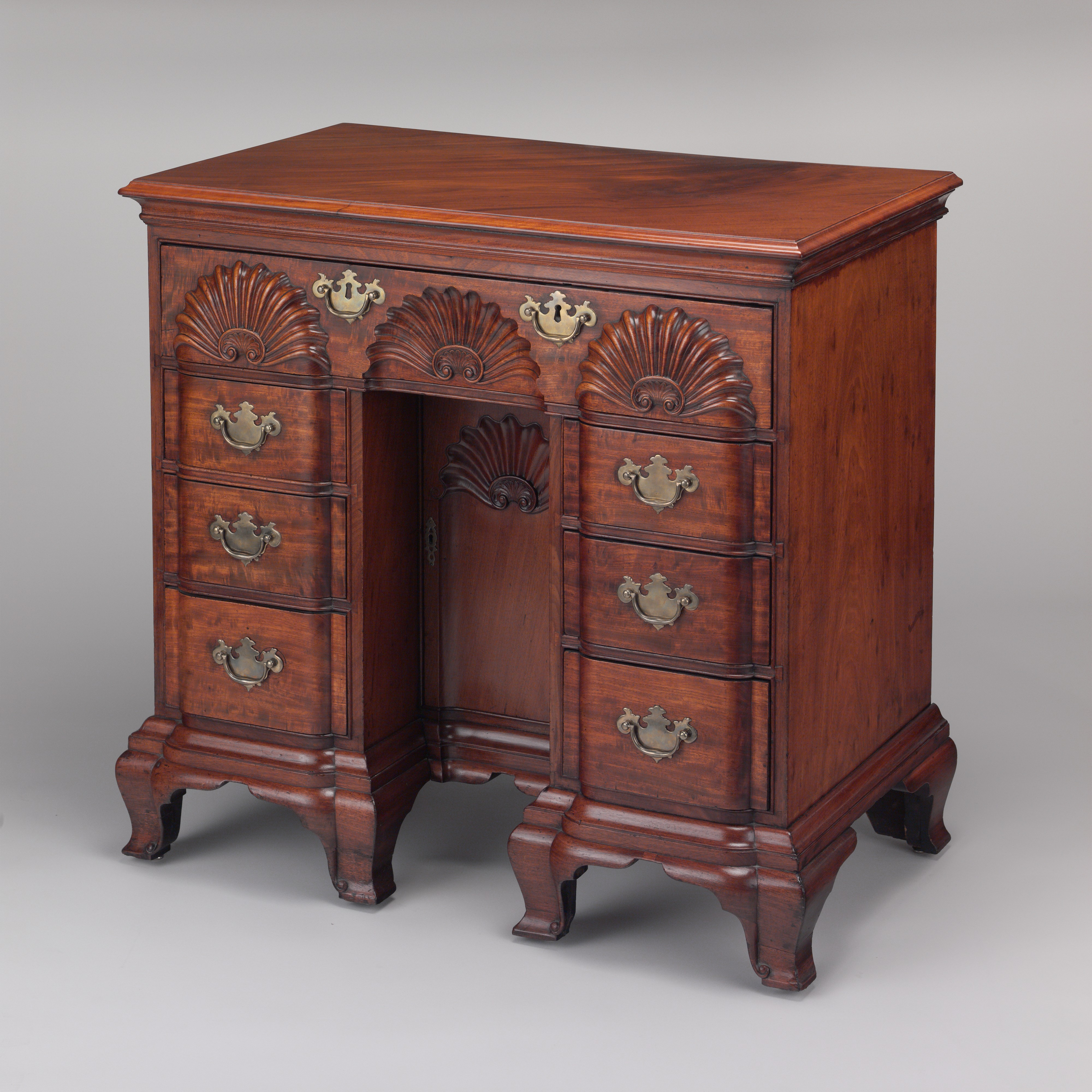
Desk; c. 1765; mahogany, chestnut and tulip poplar; 87.3 x 92.7 x 52.1 cm; Metropolitan Museum of Art (New York City)

A desk or bureau is a piece of furniture with a flat table-style work surface used in a school, office, home or the like for academic, professional or domestic activities such as reading, writing, or using equipment such as a computer. Desks often have one or more drawers, compartments, or pigeonholes to store items such as office supplies and papers. Desks are usually made of wood or metal, although materials such as glass are sometimes seen.

Some desks have the form of a table, although usually only one side of a desk is suitable to sit at (there are some exceptions, such as a partners desk) Some desks do not have the form of a table, for instance, an armoire desk is a desk built within a large wardrobe-like cabinet, and a portable desk is light enough to be placed on a person's lap. Since many people lean on a desk while using it, a desk must be sturdy. In most cases, people sit at a desk, either on a separate chair or a built-in chair (e.g., in some school desks). Some people use standing desks to be able to stand while using them.

== Etymology ==
The word "desk" originated from the Modern Latin word desca "table to write on", from the mid 14th century. It is a modification of the Old Italian desco "table", from Latin discus "dish" or "disc". The word desk has been used figuratively since 1797. A desk may also be known as a bureau, counter, davenport, escritoire, lectern, reading stand, rolltop desk, school desk, workspace, or writing desk.

== History ==
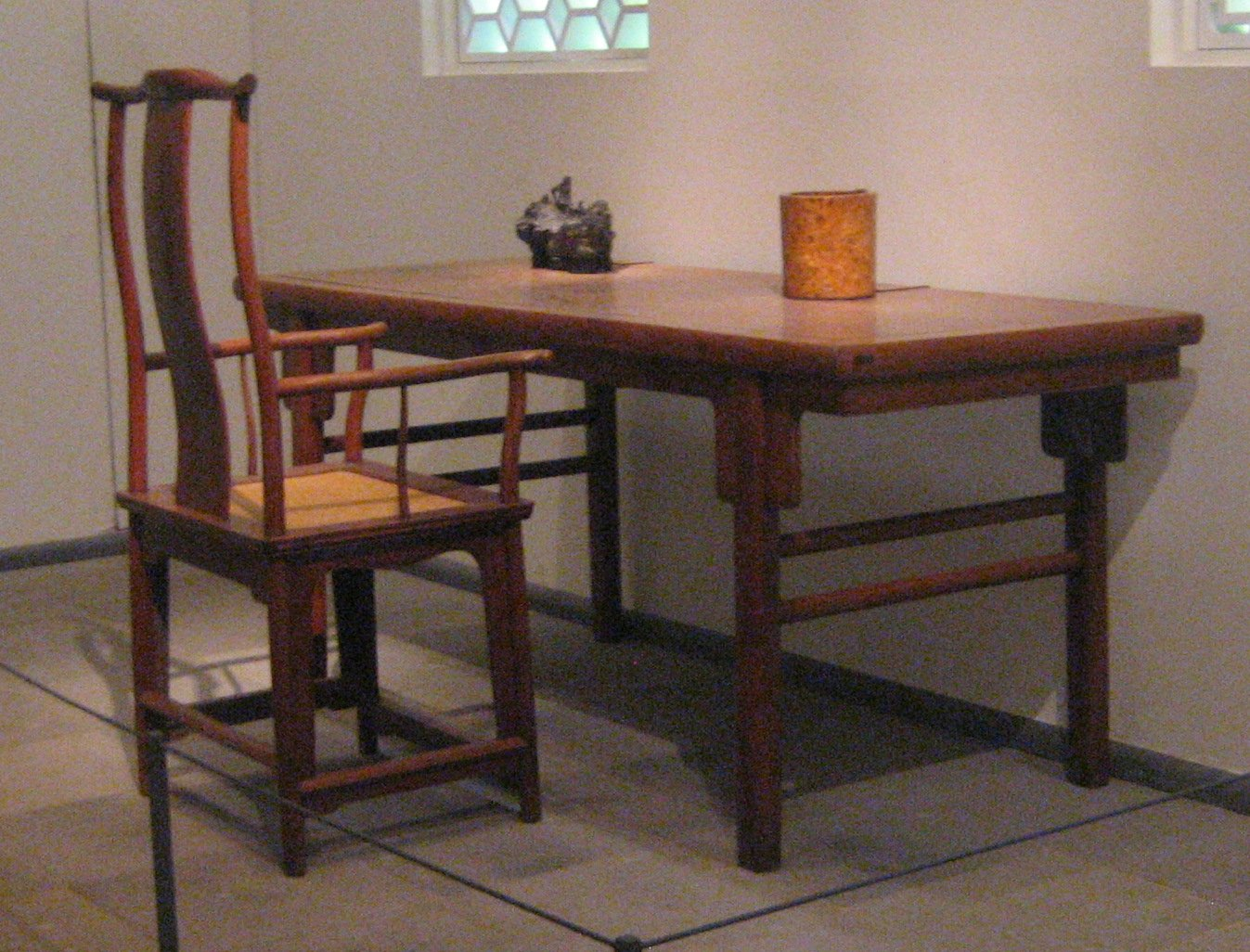
Chinese editing desk of the 12th century

Desk-style furniture appears not to have been used in classical antiquity or in other ancient centers of literate civilization in the Middle East or Far East, but there is no specific proof. Medieval illustrations show the first pieces of furniture which seem to have been designed and constructed for reading and writing. Before the invention of the movable type printing press in the 15th century, any reader was potentially a writer or publisher or both, since any book or other document had to be copied by hand. The desks were designed with slots and hooks for bookmarks and for writing implements. Since manuscript volumes were sometimes large and heavy, desks of the period usually had massive structures.

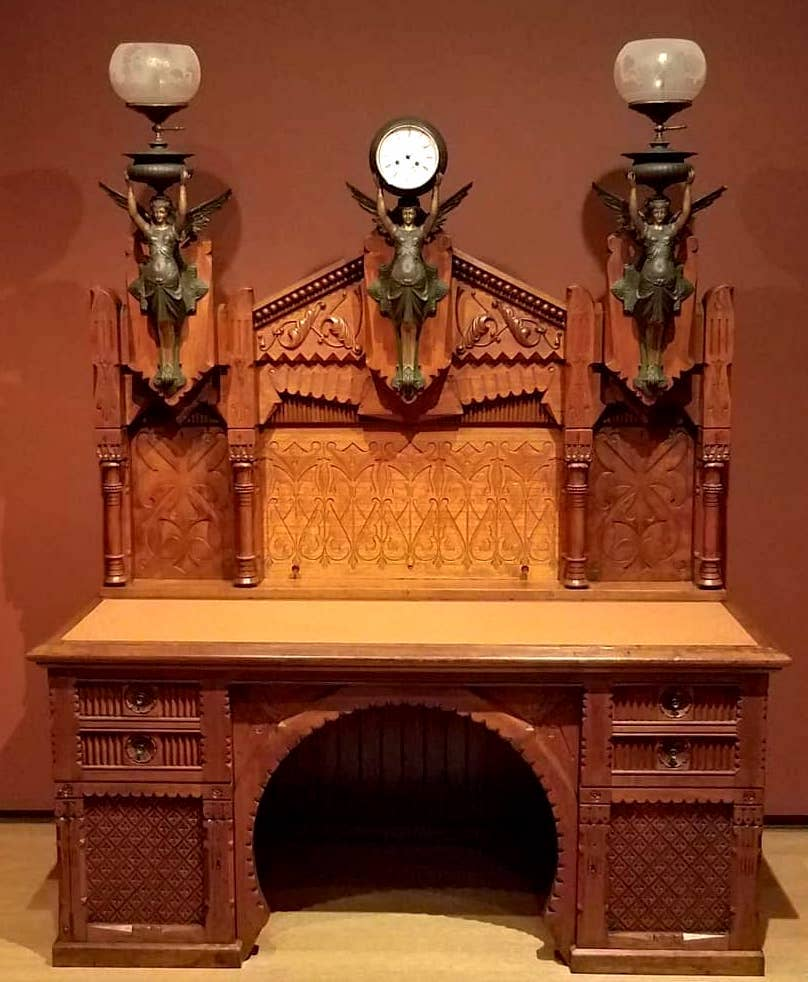
Ornamental desk (walnut), designed by Frank Furness, 1870–71, Philadelphia Museum of Art

Desks of the Renaissance and later eras had relatively slimmer structures, and more and more drawers were added as woodworking became more precise and cabinet-making became a distinct trade. It is often possible to find out if a table or other piece of furniture of those times was designed to be used as a desk, by looking for a drawer with three small separations (one each for the ink pot, the blotter and the powder tray) and storage for pens.

The basic desk forms were developed mostly in the 17th and 18th centuries. The modern ergonomic desk is a refinement of the mechanically complex drawing table or drafting table from the end of the 18th century.

== Industrial era ==
Refinements to the first desk forms were considerable through the 19th century, as steam-driven machinery made cheap wood-pulp paper possible towards the end of the first phase of the Industrial Revolution. This allowed an increase in the number of the white-collar workers. As these office workers grew in number, desks were mass-produced for them in large quantities, using newer, steam-driven woodworking machinery. This was the first sharp division in desk manufacturing. From then on, limited quantities of finely crafted desks have been continued to be constructed by master cabinetmakers for the homes and offices of the rich, while the vast majority of desks were assembled rapidly by unskilled labor from components turned out in batches by machine tools. Thus, age alone does not guarantee that an antique desk is a masterpiece, since this split in quality took place more than a hundred years ago.

A cluttered desk at the historic Harrison Brothers Hardware in Huntsville, Alabama

More paper and correspondence drove the need for more complex desks and more specialized desks, such as the rolltop desk which was a mass-produced, slatted variant of the classical cylinder desk. It provided a relatively fast and cheap way to lock up the ever increasing flow of paperwork without having to file everything by the end of the day. Paper documents became voluminous enough to be stored separately in filing cabinets. Correspondence and other documents were now too numerous to get enough attention to be rolled up or folded again, then summarized and tagged before being pigeonholed in a small compartment over or under the work surface of the desk. The famous Wooton desk and others were the last manifestations of the "pigeonhole" style. The surfaces of some newer desks could be transformed into many different shapes and angles, and were ideal for artists, draftsmen, and engineers.

== Steel versions ==
A small boom in office work and desk production occurred at the end of the 19th century and the beginning of the 20th with the introduction of smaller and less expensive electrical presses and efficient carbon paper coupled with the general acceptance of the typewriter. Steel desks were introduced to take heavier loads of paper and withstand the pounding meted out on the typewriters. This also gave rise to the "typewriter desk", a platform, sometimes on wheels and with expandable surface via flaps, that was built to a specific height to make typing easier and more comfortable than when using a standard or traditional desk. The L-shaped desk also became popular, with the "leg" being used as an annex for the typewriter.

Another big expansion occurred after the Second World War with the spread of photocopying. Paperwork further increased the number of desk workers, whose work surfaces diminished in size as office rents rose, and the paper itself was moved more and more directly to filing cabinets or sent to specialized records management centers, or transformed into microfilm, or both. Modular desks seating several co-workers close by became common. Even executive or management desks became mass-produced, built of cheap plywood or fiberboard covered with wood finish, as the number of people managing the white collar workers became even greater.

== Student models ==
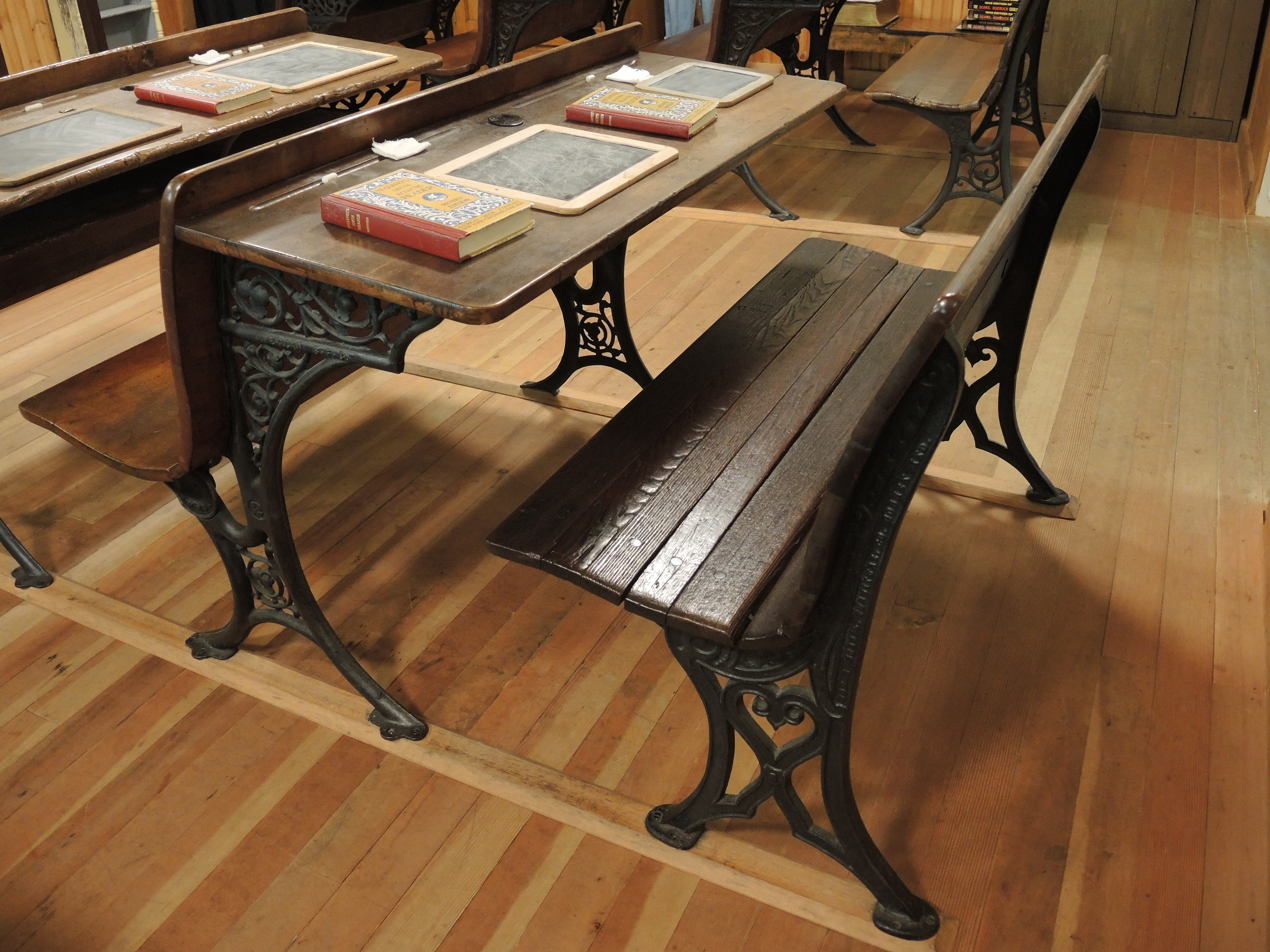
School desk manufactured by the American S.F. Company of Buffalo, New York in about 1900

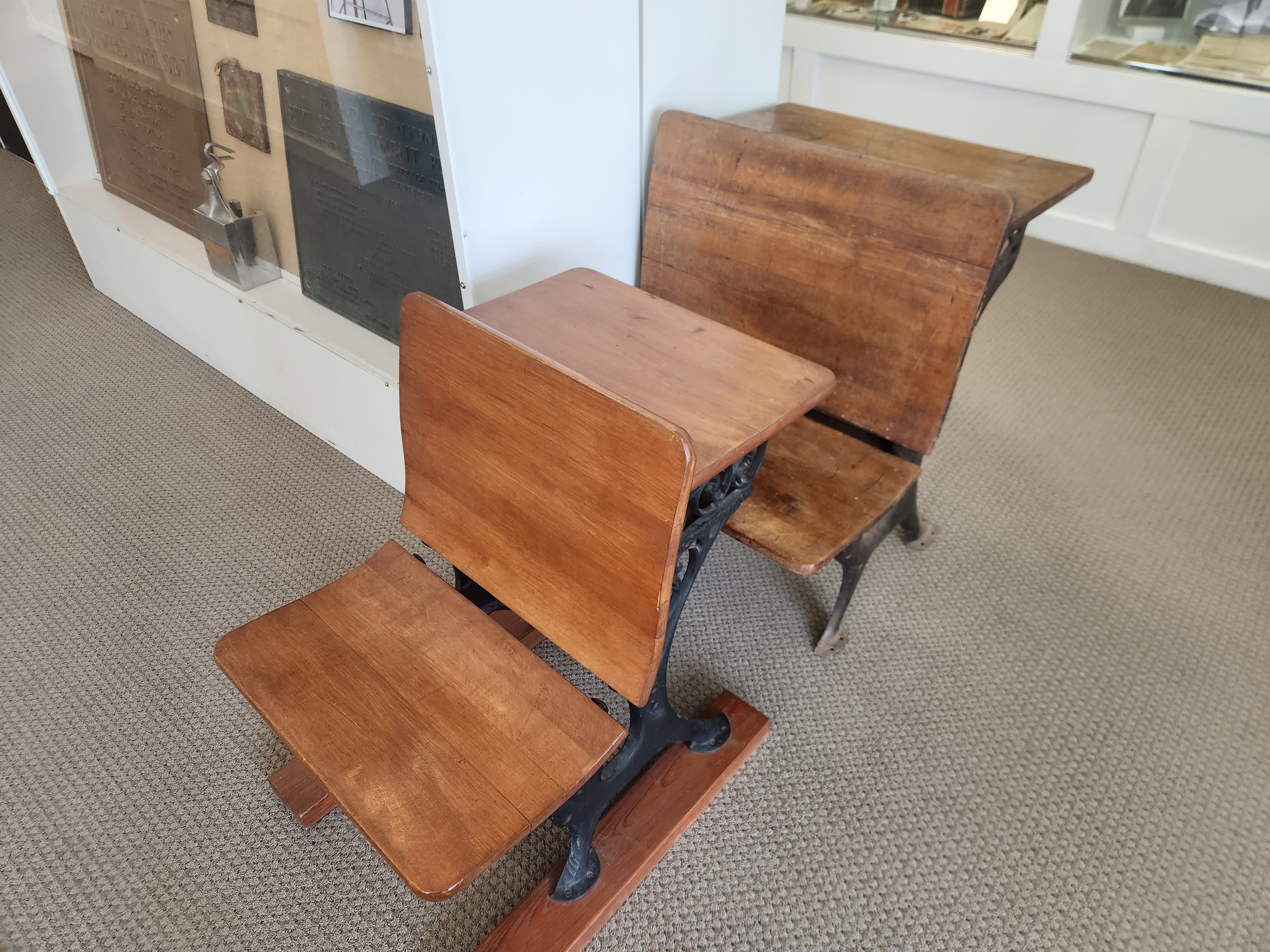
School desks at the Jeffersontown Historical Museum

A student desk can be any desk form meant for use by an enrollee in elementary, secondary or postsecondary education. Anna Breadin designed and patented a one-piece school desk in the late 1880s that was built with a table section attached in front of a wooden seat and back rest. Before this, most students in America sat either on chairs or long benches at long tables.

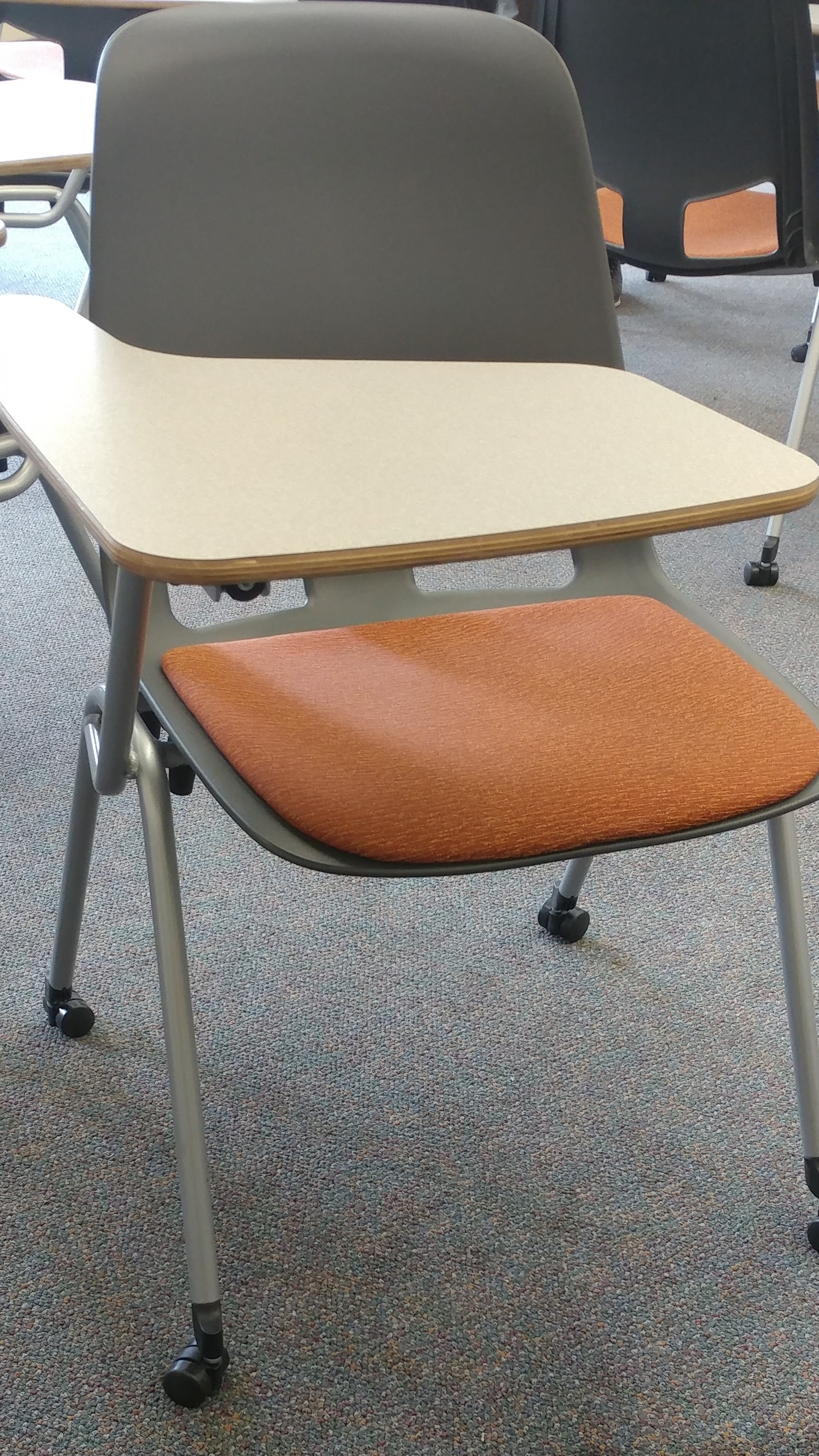
Student desk and chair commonly used in high schools and universities.

In homes, the term "student desk" designates a small pedestal desk, or writing table constructed for use by a teenager or a pre-teen in their room. It often is a pedestal desk, with only one of the two pedestals and about two-thirds of the desk surface. Such desks are sometimes called "left-pedestal desks" and "right-pedestal desks", depending on the position of the single pedestal. These desks are not as tall as normal adult desks. In some cases, the desk is connected from the seat to the table.

The desks are usually mass-produced in steel or wood and sold on the consumer market. There is a wide variety of plans available for woodworking enthusiasts to build their own versions. Modern mass-produced student desks are often made with laminate table tops and molded plastic seats in a combined single unit, with storage found under the desktop or on a wire shelf beneath the seat. There are many novel forms of student desks made to maximize the relatively restricted area available in a child's room. One of the most common is the bunk-bed desk, also called the "loft bed".

== Influence of computers ==
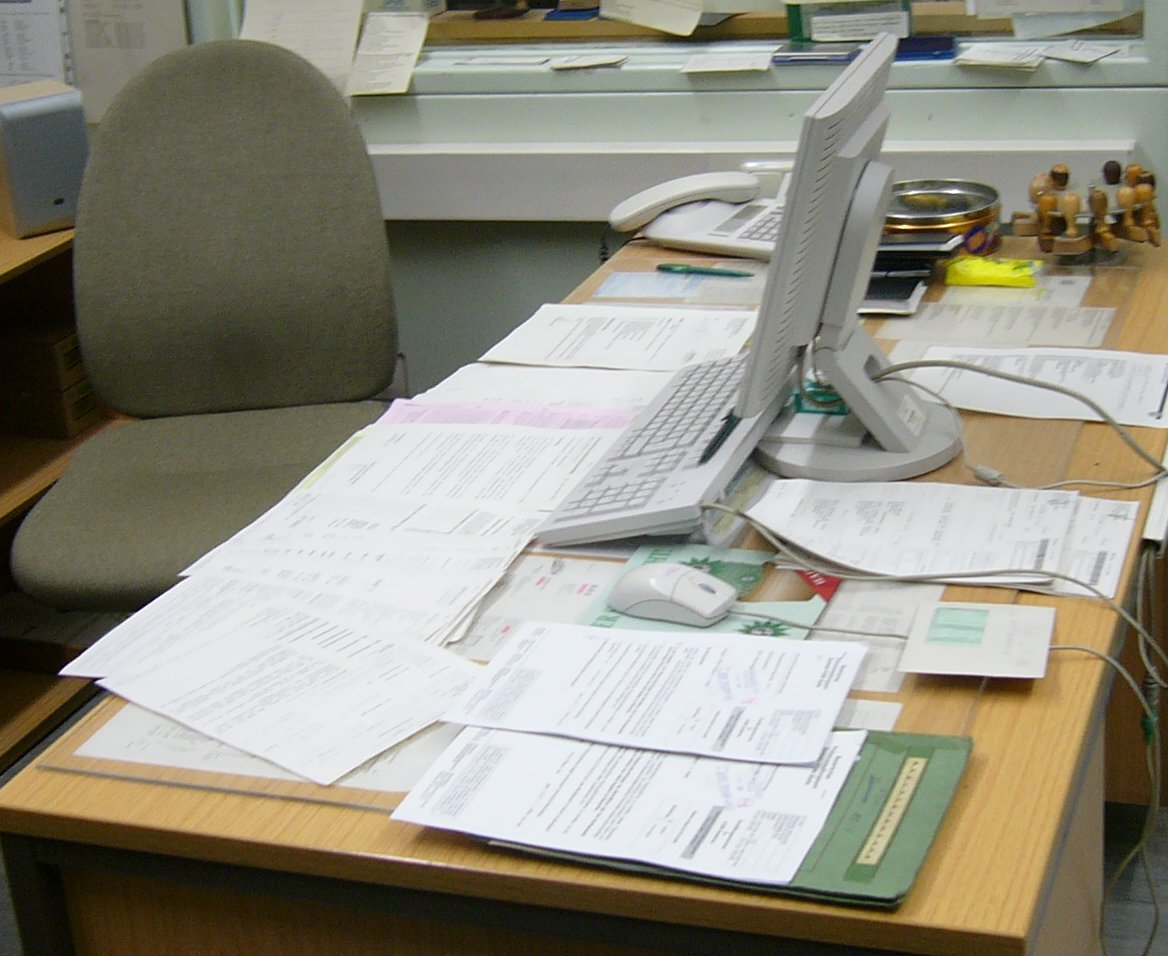
A desk in an office

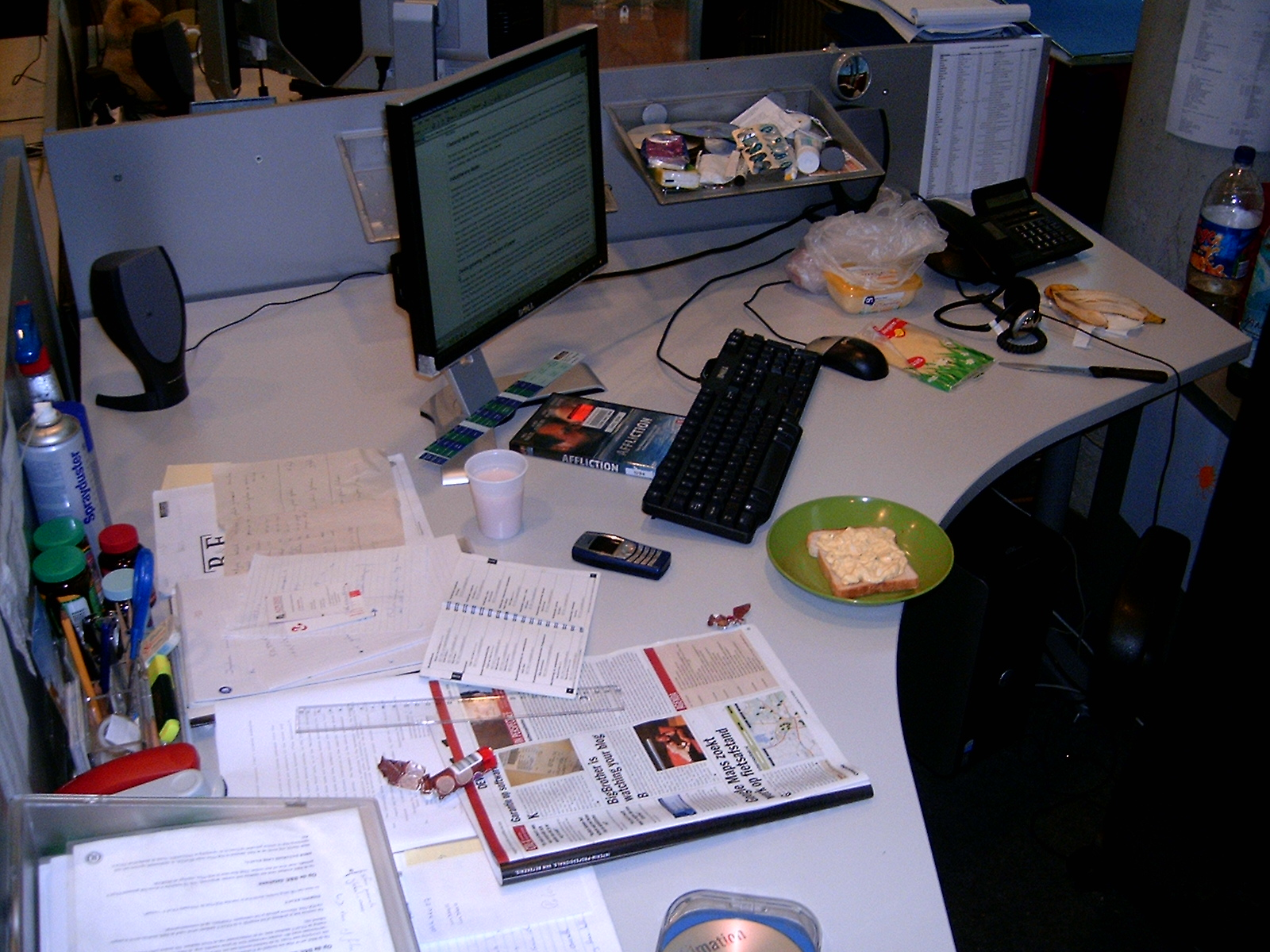
An office desk in a cubicle, which shows the sharing of space between computer components and paper documents

Until the late 1980s, desks remained a place for paperwork and "business machines", but the personal computer was taking hold in large and medium-sized businesses. New office suites included a "knee hole" credenza which was a place for a terminal or personal computer and keyboard tray. Soon, new office designs also included "U-shape" suites which added a bridge worksurface between the back credenza and front desk. During the North American recession of the early 1990s, many managers and executive workers were required to do word processing and other functions previously completed by typing pools and secretaries. This necessitated a more central placement of the computer on these "U-shape" suite desk systems.

With computers more prevalent, "computer paper" became an office supply. The beginning of this paper boom gave birth to the dream of the "paperless office", in which all information would only appear on computer monitors. However, the ease of printing personal documents and the lack of comfort with reading text on computer monitors led to a great deal of document printing. The need for paperwork space vied with the increased desk space taken up by computer monitors, computers, printers, scanners, and other peripherals. The need for more space led some desk companies to attach some accessory items to the modesty panel at the back of the desk, such as outlet strips and cable management, in an attempt to clear the desktop of electrical clutter.

Through the "tech boom" of the 1990s, office worker numbers increased along with the cost of office space rent. The cubicle desk became widely accepted in North America as an economical way of squeezing more desk workers into the same space, without further shrinking the size of their cramped working surfaces. The cubicle walls have become a new place for workers to affix papers and other items once left on the horizontal desktop surface. Even computer monitor bezels themselves were used to attach reminder notes and business cards.

Early in the 2000s, private office workers found that their side and back computer-placing furniture made it hard to show the contents of a computer screen to guests or co-workers. Manufacturers have responded to this issue by creating "forward facing" desks where computer monitors are placed on the front of the "U-shape" workstation. This forward computer monitor placement promotes a clearer sight-line to greet colleagues and allows for common viewing of information displayed on a screen.

Replacement of bulky CRT monitors with flat panel LCDs freed up significant room on desktops. However, the size of displays often increased to accommodate multiple on-screen windows, to display more and more information simultaneously. The lighter weight and slimmer profile of the new displays allowed them to be mounted on flexible arms, so they could be swung into view or out of the way, and adjusted frequently as needed.

== Notable examples ==
- The Resolute desk in the Oval Office has been used by many United States presidents, including John F. Kennedy, Ronald Reagan, and Barack Obama. It is made from the timbers of HMS Resolute, an abandoned British ship discovered by an American vessel and returned to Queen Victoria of Great Britain as a token of friendship and goodwill. Queen Victoria commissioned the desk from William Evenden, Royal Naval Dockyard at Chatham, England, and presented it to President Rutherford B. Hayes in 1880.
- The Bureau du Roi (French pronunciation: [byʁo dy ʁwa], the King's desk), also known as Louis XV's roll-top secretary (French: Secrétaire à cylindre de Louis XV), is the richly ornamented royal cylinder desk which was constructed at the end of Louis XV's reign, and is now again in the Palace of Versailles.
- Henry VIII's writing desk is a portable writing desk, made in about 1525–26 for Henry VIII. It is currently in the Victoria and Albert Museum. The desk is a product of the royal workshops and is lavishly embellished with ornamental motifs introduced to the Kingdom of England by continental artists.

== See also ==
- List of desk forms and types
