= Ross & Co. Dublin Cabinet Makers =

Irish furniture company

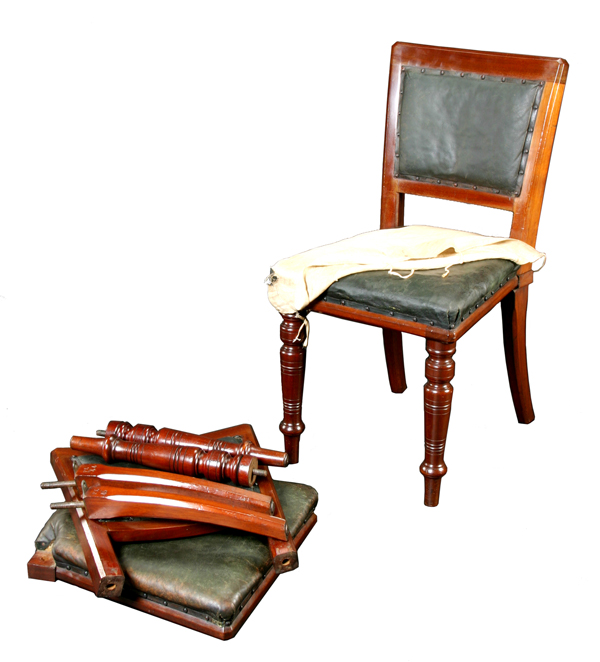
A pair of campaign chairs by Ross & Co.

Ross and Co. of Dublin was an Irish company that manufactured campaign furniture, primarily for military officers and officials going overseas. The company opened around 1820 and closed around 1909.

== History ==
Eleanor Ross founded E. Ross at 6 Ellis Quay in Dublin at the end of the 18th century. The company advertised that they were established in 1760 but their earliest found advertisement is their directory listing of 1820.

The business capitalized on the demand for portable furniture that accompanied the expansion of the British Empire in the 19th century. The increased movement of administrators, colonists and of course the army and navy to service Britain's overseas territories, provided a strong customer base for their campaign equipage. Although the company also created home furnishings, it was a small part of their business.

By 1822, the company became Ross E. Army Furniture warehouse. At some point, the company operated a factory at 35 Tighe Street to the rear of the main premises on Ellis Quay. Both locations were close to the Royal Barracks, where many of their officer clients were stationed.

On 1 July 1853 designers James Ross Murphy and Patrick Murphy were granted a patent for their design for a portable combined chair and couch. On 11 August that year they were granted a patent for a portable reclining chair.

Most items manufactured by Ross differed greatly from those of their competitors. Many of their chests have a unique folding superstructure or an unusual combination of drawers. Their washstands don't have the usual brass standards, but have turned columns instead.

Much of Ross's work can be considered typical of the William IV and Victorian periods in its use of the fashionable design features of the day. A good example of this is the Desk Chair, that breaks down into eight pieces for travel.

== Suites of furniture ==
Ross offered a suite of furniture. A suite would include a short set of dining chairs, an easy chair, a couch, a center table and a chiffonier or sideboard which broke down to become the packing case. On the inside door of the cabinet furniture would be a label, giving packing instructions. The packing case cabinets were often adorned with carved decoration and moulding, which again was unusual for campaign furniture that mostly considered flat surfaces and square edges to be a pre-requisite. However, when it came to packing the cabinet, the moulding would be removed and the carved show wood protected with a bolt-on panel so no sacrifice was made for the added decoration.

Perhaps the most famous such suite is that made for Captain Simner of the 76th Regiment and his wife, Francis Mary Bolton, as a wedding present on 27 March 1863. It was made from walnut taken from the family estate at Bective, in Ireland and travelled with the Captain and his wife to Madras, Burma and Secunderabad over a 12-year period.

== Labelling and numbering ==
Ross labeled most of their work with either a painted stencil, or small ivory or brass plaque, with their address. Unlabelled pieces probably originated from a suite and have the Ross mark. The use of walnut was common for Ross; most campaign furniture makers preferred mahogany or teak.

Furniture by Ross was often given a two digit number or sometimes a letter and number depending on the item. An example of such numbering is the set of four Balloon Back Chairs, illustrated, where the numbers range from 62 and 63 on the first chair to 70 and 71 on the second, 74 and 75 on the third and 92 and 93 on the fourth.

== Recognition ==
In 1864, Ross and company their reputation received the approval of Albert Edward, Prince of Wales. By 1882, the British Army was recommending their products. The Report of the Kabul Committee on Equipment (Calcutta) stated

". . . the committee now consider it to be necessary for the comfort of an officer, that he should have a bed, and they find that the pattern…made by Ross of Dublin is the most suitable. It weighs under 20lbs."

Much of Ross's success came from its close proximity to the Royal Barracks, the largest such facility in the United Kingdom and Europe. The barracks' landed officers could afford the best, and wished to travel in style and have all the comforts of home when they arrived at their destination.

== Decline ==
In December 1905, Ross & Co. announced a liquidation sale in The Irish Times. Fewer people were being stationed abroad. After suffering setbacks from the mobile commandos in the Boer war, the British Army was learning to travel more lightly. The emergence of the automobile also meant people could travel farther more quickly and take less with them. Added to this Ross probably suffered from the same effect that many independent retailers also do today, the popularity of the superstore. The end of the 19th century saw the spectacular rise of Army and Navy Stores, where everything could be bought and shipped to its destination, from a travel shaving brush to a tent.

== Sources ==
- British Campaign Furniture Elegance under Canvas by Nicholas Brawer ISBN 0-8109-5711-6
- The Bonaparte - Wyse Papers. National Library of Ireland, Collection List No. 119, (MSS 41,612 -41,625), (Accession No. 2233)
- Commercial Directory of Ireland, Scotland, and the four most northern counties of England, 1820
- Pettigrew & Oulton’s Dublin Almanac for 1842
- The Dublin Almanac and General Register of Ireland, 1843
- Slater’s Commercial Directory of Ireland 1846, page 126
- Thom's Irish Almanac and Official Directory, with the Post Office Dublin City and County Directory, 1850
- The Irish Industrial Exhibition, of 1853: A Detailed Catalogue of Its Contents
- The Exhibition Expositor, Wednesday, July 13, 1853
- Design for a Portable Reclining Chair, James Ross Murphy and Patrick Murphy. 3498 Design's Official Registration, August 11, 1853
- The Advocate, Saturday Evening, June 16, 1855
- The Dublin Evening Mail, Wednesday, April 15, 1860. Advertisement.
- Dublin Evening Mail - Friday 8 February 1861. Advertisement.
- Catholic Telegraph - Saturday 6 July 1861
- Dublin Evening Mail - Thursday 30 November 1871. Advertisement.
- Freeman's Journal - Tuesday 6 September 1881
- Freeman's Journal - Wednesday 9 October 1889
- Irish Times, Thursday, June 4, 1896
- Census of Ireland, 1901 (10 Ellis's Quay)
- Irish Times, Tuesday, December 12, 1905
- The Irish Times, Tuesday, June 12, 1906
- Irish Times, Saturday, February 2, 1907
- A Most Delightful Station, The British Army on the Curragh of Kildare, Ireland, 1855-1922 by Con Costello ISBN 1-898256-73-X
- At Ease Gentlemen by Christopher Clarke Antiques
- The Portable Empire by Christopher Clarke Antiques
- Ireland's Antiques & Period Properties Vol 1 No. 3 Summer / Autumn 2004
