= Royal Military Infirmary =

Georgian hospital in Dublin, Ireland

Royal Military Infirmary, Dublin
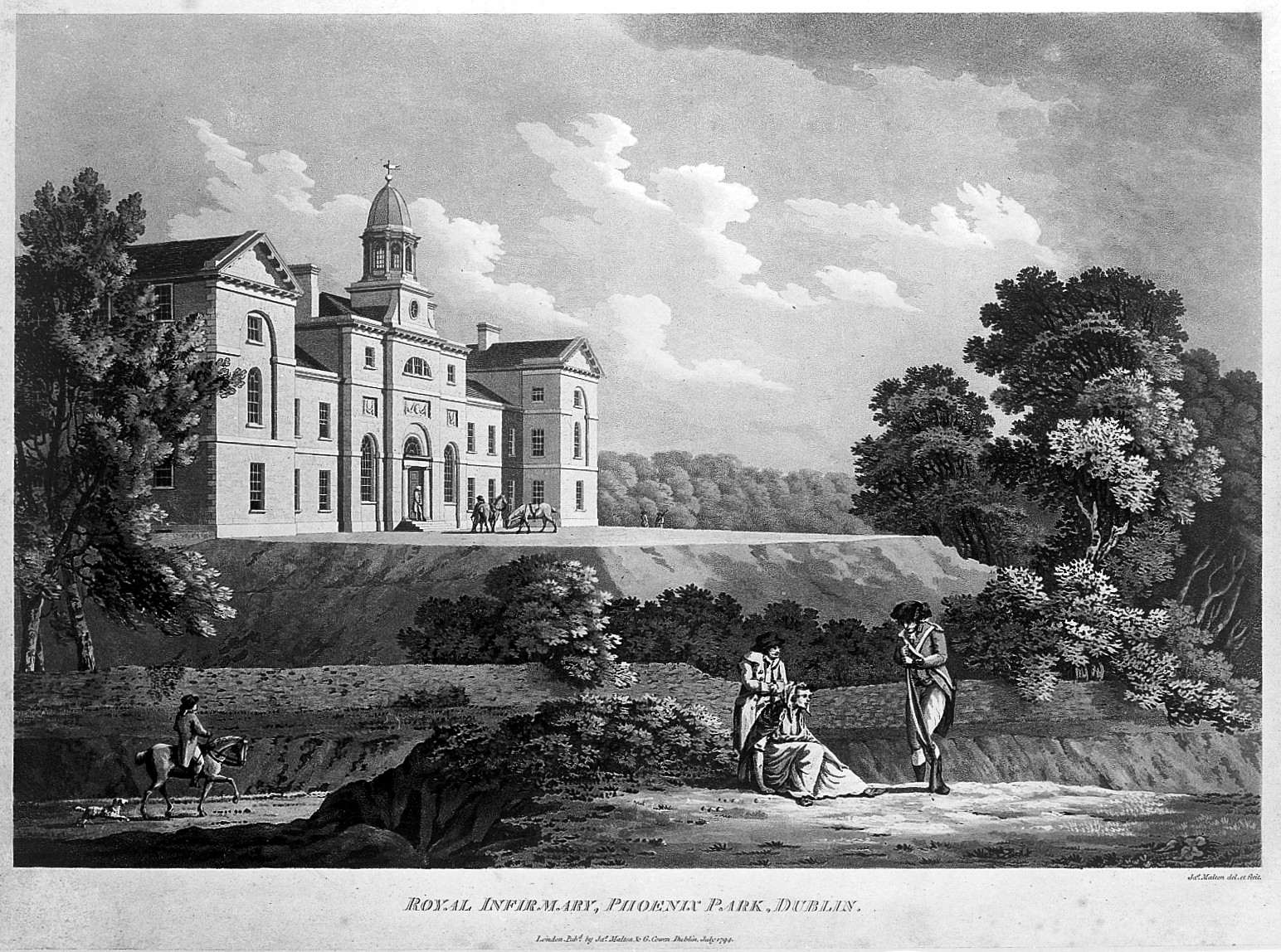
- The Royal Military Infirmary in 1794

- Site of Former Royal Military Infirmary

Geography
- Location: Phoenix Park, Dublin, Ireland
- Coordinates: 53.350120°N 6.296806°W

Organisation
- Type: Former British Military Hospital
- Patron: Government of the Republic of Ireland
- Network: Irish Department of Defence

Services
- Beds: Originally designed for circa 190

History
- Founded: 1788 (building completed)
- Closed: 1913 (but reopened during WW1)

The Royal Military Infirmary (RMI) is a former hospital on the southeastern edge of Phoenix Park in Dublin. One of several former British military installations in the area, it gives its name to Infirmary Road, which borders the park at its entrance. The bulk of the British Army's medical services in Dublin were transferred from the RMI to a new hospital at Arbour Hill in 1913. The hospital buildings are now part of the Department of Defence's estate and currently houses the Office of the Director of Public Prosecutions (ODPP). The Infirmary buildings are protected as they are nationally significant architecture.

== History ==
The original RMI was designed by the English Architect James Gandon in the late Eighteenth Century. The executant architect for the building's construction was William Gibson, who redesigned some aspects of the building; the building's construction took place from 1786 to 1788. The original construction costs for the infirmary were recorded as £9000. Its design was seen as advanced and best in its class as a military hospital well after its inauguration.

The Infirmary's role was to take sick soldiers who could not be adequately dealt with by regimental hospitals in the various barracks of the Dublin Garrison. Between 1824 and 1825 the Infirmary was reconfigured as a military general hospital.

In 1806, the costs of the Infirmary and all other medical facilities in Ireland were costing the British Exchequer circa £15418. In 1835 soldier patients were expected to have some of their pay deducted to meet the running costs of the Infirmary.

The Infirmary was operating as a general hospital for the British Military during the 1900s and 1910s. However, the British Military had intended to close the hospital in 1911 on the completion of a new hospital which had been commenced in 1909 at Arbour Hill in Dublin. In 1910, the British Government had not decided on a purpose for the old hospital building In 1910, Lieutenant Colonel O Birt, was posted as the senior medical officer in charge of the Royal Military Infirmary. All proving that the Infirmary continued to function well beyond the date the British Government had anticipated. The Infirmary was certainly functioning as a hospital during World War 1.

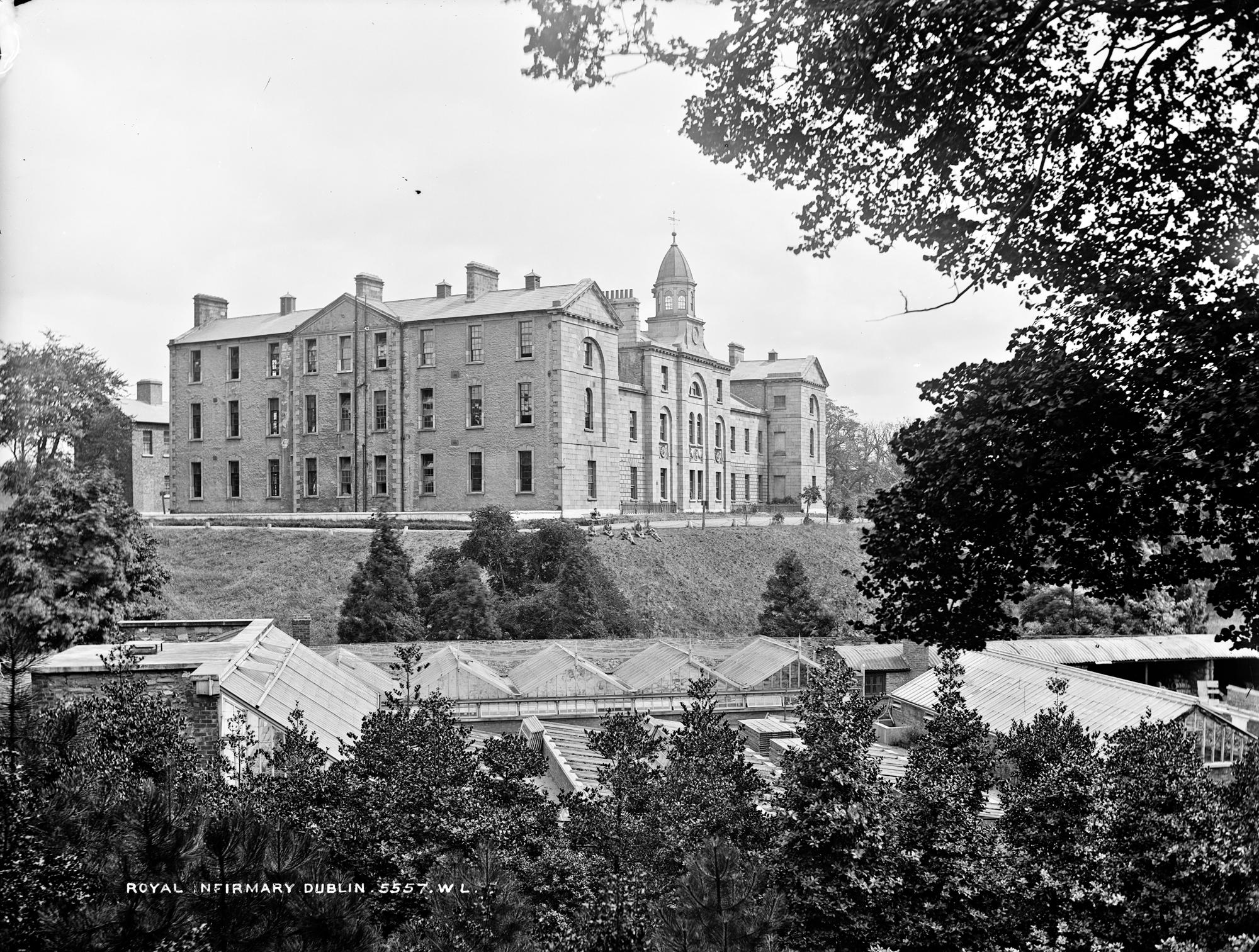
The Royal Military Infirmary, looking from Phoenix Park

The RMI and all other British Military installations fell under the direct control of the Irish Free State (Saorstát Éireann) in 1922 and the Department of Defence became the managing entity of the old Infirmary site and that remains the case to the present day. In 2007, there was a proposal to renovate the original Gandon building and adjacent annexe and construct a subterranean annexe to provide new office space for the relocation of the ODPP. This project did not take place as originally conceived.

== Site Description ==
The Infirmary's foundation stone was laid in the presence of the then Lord Lieutenant of Ireland the Duke of Rutland on 17 August 1786. The original main three-storey building was designed with a C-shaped footprint; it was built of granite blocks faced with Portland stone. The main facade (circa 60 metres in width) faces southwest on raised ground overlooking the southern entrance of Phoenix Park. This frontage includes a glazed cupola tower that sits above a central clock face. Inside the original Infirmary, there were 13 wards (six allocated to surgical and seven allocated to medical patients) which were mainly located in the two rearward-orientated wings; initially, these wards could accommodate 187 beds. The central building span included offices, staff accommodation, chapel and other facilities.

On the opposite side of Infirmary Road from the RMI building is the former Royal Military Isolation Hospital, which after decades of vacancy was earmarked in 2020 for redevelopment as a community centre.

== See also ==
Other former British Army buildings in Phoenix Park:

- Royal Hibernian Military School
- Magazine Fort
- Ordnance Survey Ireland
