= Parkgate Street, Dublin =

Street in Dublin, Ireland

Parkgate Street
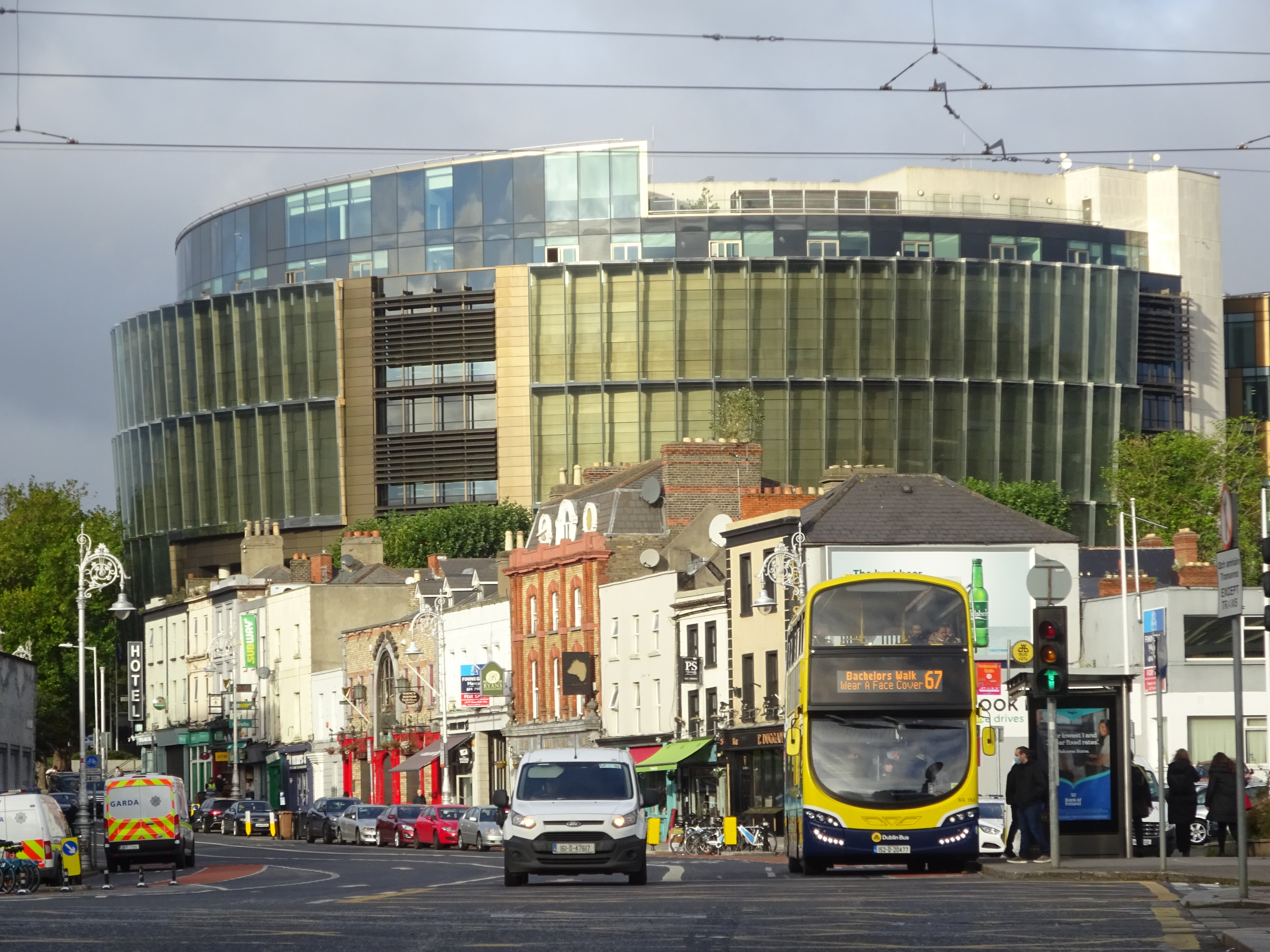
- Looking west up Parkgate Street in 2021
- Interactive map of Parkgate Street
- Native name: Sráid Gheata na Páirce (Irish)
- Location: Dublin, Ireland
- Postal code: D07
- Coordinates: 53°20′53″N 6°17′29″W
- east end: Benburb Street
- Major junctions: Infirmary Road, Wolfe Tone Quay
- west end: Conyngham Road

Parkgate Street (Irish: Sráid Gheata na Páirce) is a street in Dublin which connects Benburb Street to the east and Conyngham Road to the west. It is named after the main gate to The Phoenix Park at the end of Chesterfield Avenue, the parks main thoroughfare.

== History ==
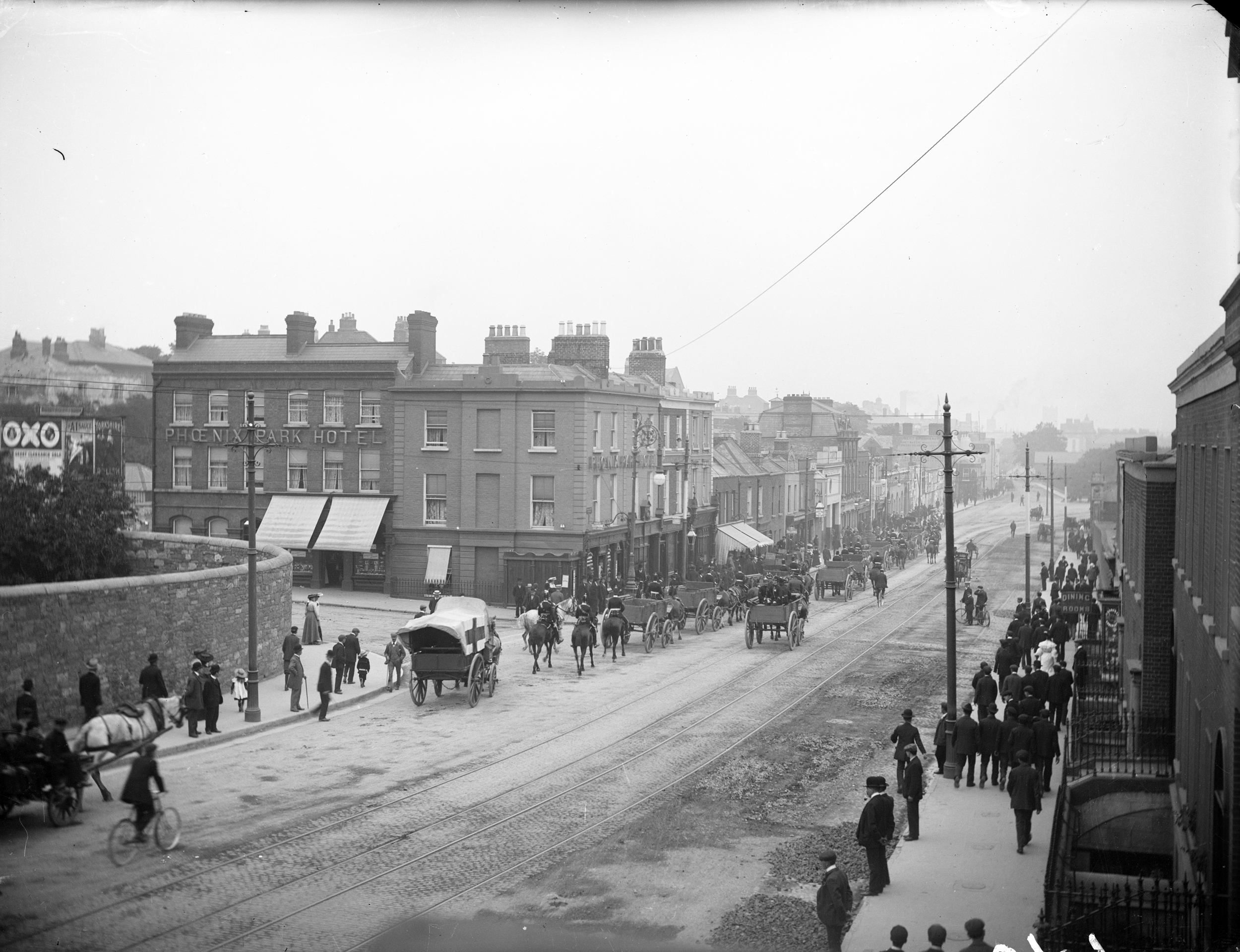
Parkgate Street in the 1910s looking east towards the city centre

Parkgate Street is named for its proximity to the main entrance to the Phoenix Park. The street was created when the road running west from Barrack Street (now Benburb Street) to Islandbridge was widened by the Wide Streets Commission in the 1780s to create Parkgate Street and Conyngham Road. The Park gate of Phoenix Park and the thoroughfare appear on maps as early as 1756.

A public fountain designed by Woodward and Deane in 1860 remains on the street as a recess at the entrance to the park. Ryan's pub on Parkgate Street is a fine example of a Victorian Dublin pub dating from 1896, and retains many of its original features.

The Criminal Courts of Justice sit on the corner of Parkgate Street and Infirmary Road, designed by Henry J. Lyons & Partners and built in 2010. It was the largest court project built in Ireland for over 200 years.

=== National Shell Factory ===
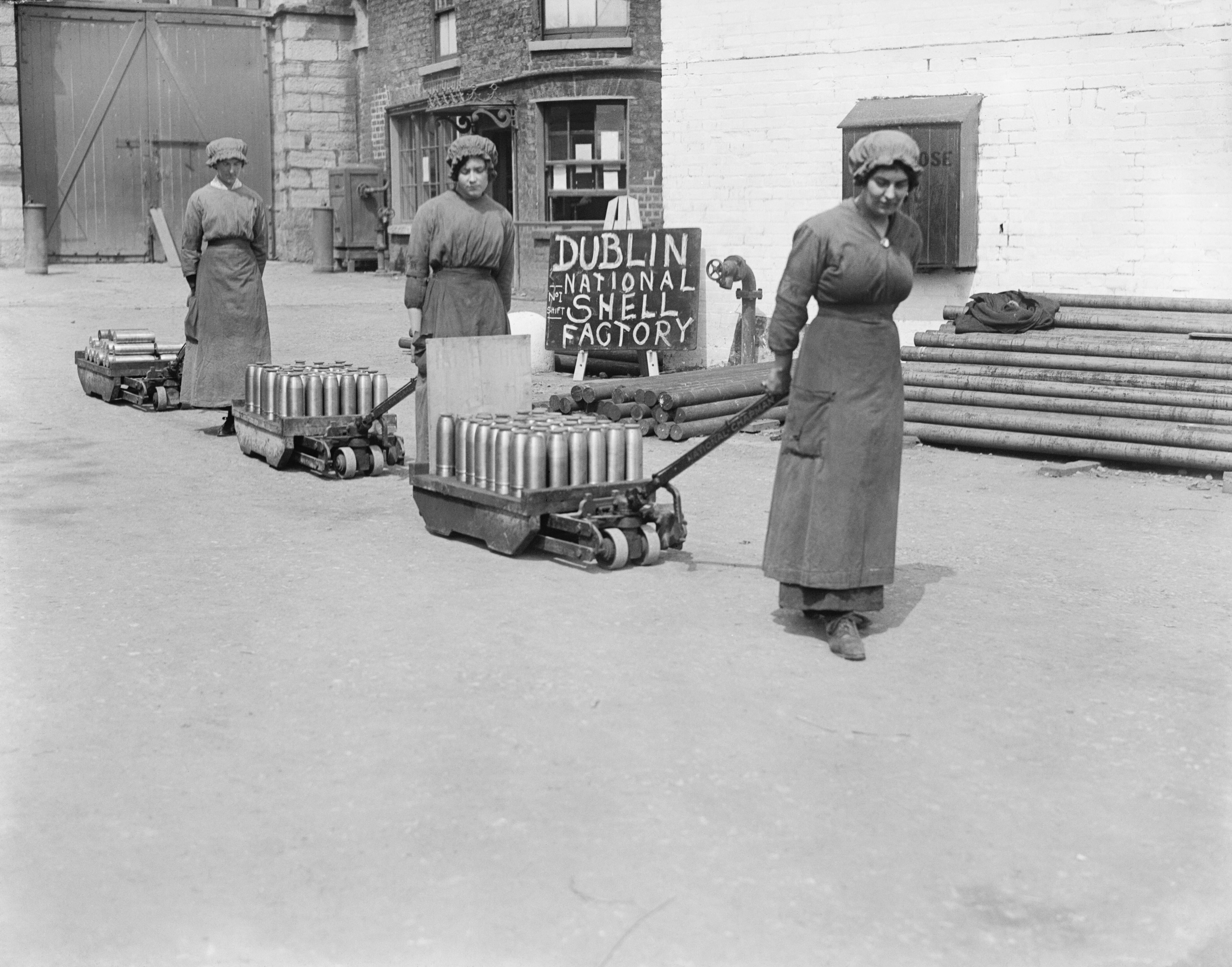
Women workers at the National Shell Factory, Dublin during WWI

A 30 storey residential tower is planned for 42a Parkgate Street at the junction with Wolfe Tone Quay at the River Liffey. It was designed by Howells & Reddy Architecture + Urbanism, and construction beginning from August 2026. This site was the former iron foundry, later the National Shell Factory during WWI, and later a warehouse and office for Hickey's Fabrics. After the shell factory closed in 1921, it was used as a storage depot by the British Army, and was attacked by the I.R.A.
