= Criminal Courts of Justice, Dublin =

Criminal Courts of Justice
- Na Cúirteanna Breithiúnais Coiriúla
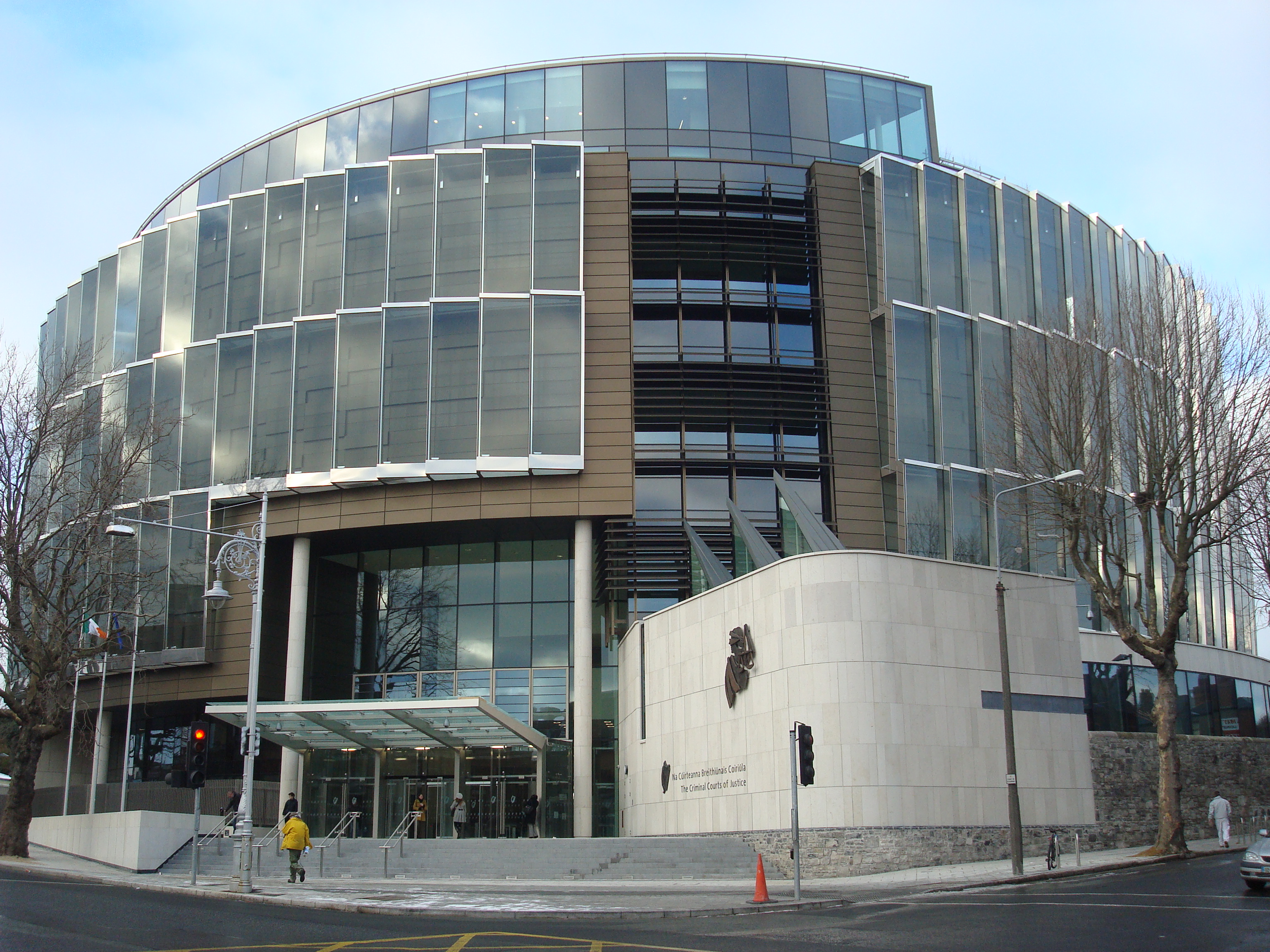

- Location within Central Dublin

General information
- Type: Courthouse
- Architectural style: Modern
- Location: Parkgate Street, Dublin 8, Dublin, Ireland
- Coordinates: 53.348631°N 6.295682°W
- Elevation: 10 m (33 ft)
- Groundbreaking: 2007
- Opened: January 2010
- Cost: €140 million
- Owner: Courts Service

Height
- Height: 32 m (105 ft)

Dimensions
- Diameter: 40 m (130 ft)

Technical details
- Material: reinforced concrete, glass, timber
- Floor count: 11
- Floor area: 25,000 m^{2} (270,000 sq ft)
- Lifts/elevators: 27
- Grounds: 0.95 hectare (2.3 acre)

Design and construction
- Architect: Peter McGovern
- Architecture firm: Henry J. Lyons & Partners
- Services engineer: J.V. Tierney & Co. Consulting Engineers
- Awards: Public Choice Award / Best Accessible Award 2010

Other information
- Number of rooms: 600+
- Parking: 72 spaces on-site

The Criminal Courts of Justice (Irish: Na Cúirteanna Breithiúnais Coiriúla) is the principal courts building for the criminal courts in Ireland. It stands on the corner of Parkgate Street and Infirmary Road, near the Phoenix Park.

== History ==
The court building, which officially opened in January 2010, replaced the Four Courts and other buildings as the location for most criminal matters before the Dublin Metropolitan District Court and Dublin Circuit Court. The complex also houses the regular sittings of the Central Criminal Court, Special Criminal Court and is home to the criminal division of the Court of Appeal. The Four Courts and Green Street Court House are still used for civil cases.

In a change from previous older courts buildings in Ireland, the building has facilities to hold up to 100 prisoners in the basement, with separate entrances for each court. Jurors are also based in a separate part of the building with their own court entrances after being empanelled, in order to keep them separate from the public. Victims and victim support organisations also have use of a suite of rooms.

The building contains rooms for 150 barristers as well as offices for Gardaí, the Director of Public Prosecutions, Probation Service, Law Society of Ireland, judges' chambers, press rooms and court administration.

The building is owned by International Public Partnerships, a London listed fund managed by Amber Infrastructure Partners under a 25 year concession from April 2007.

== Gallery ==
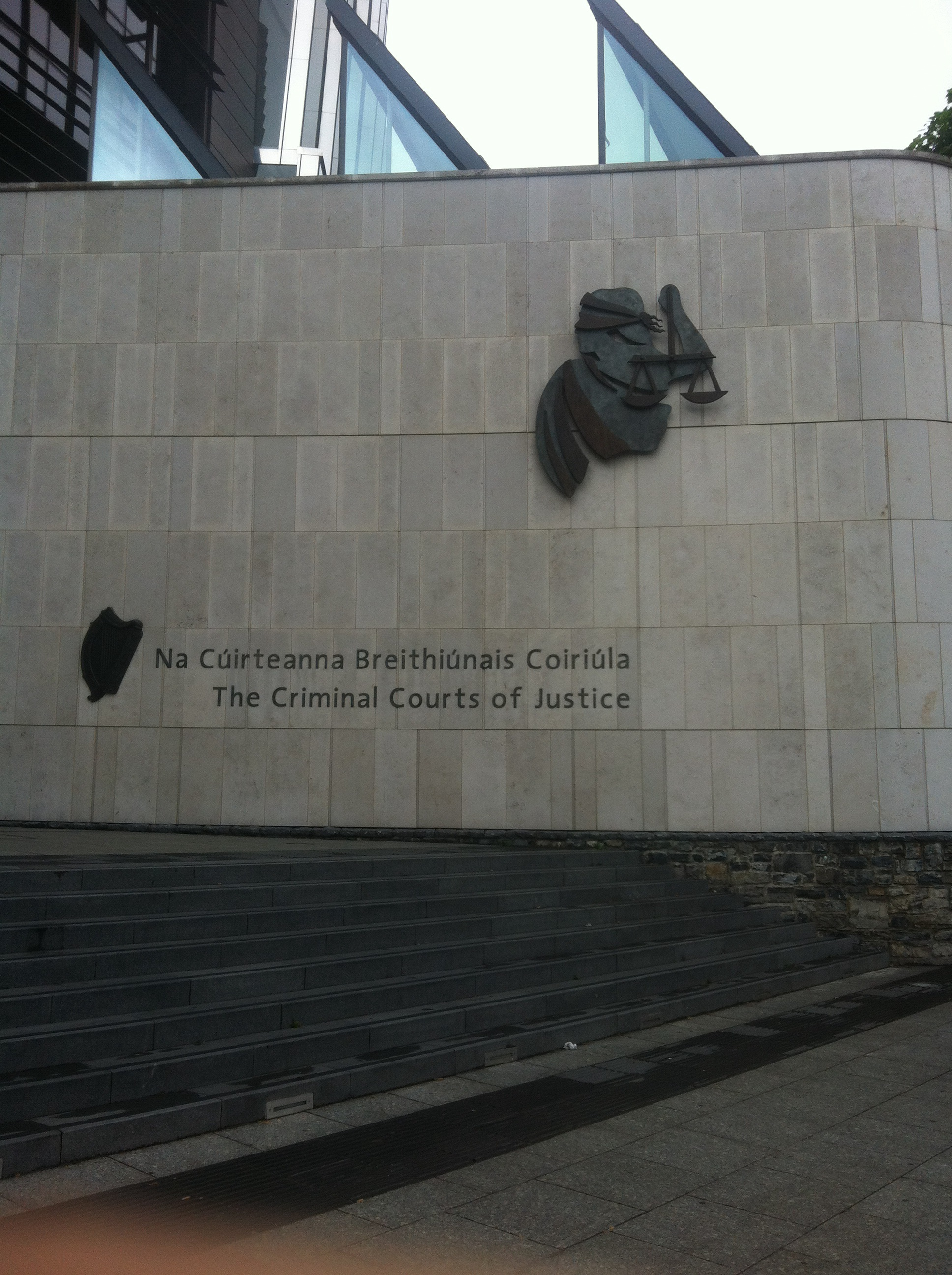
Signage with Lady Justice insignia at the entrance

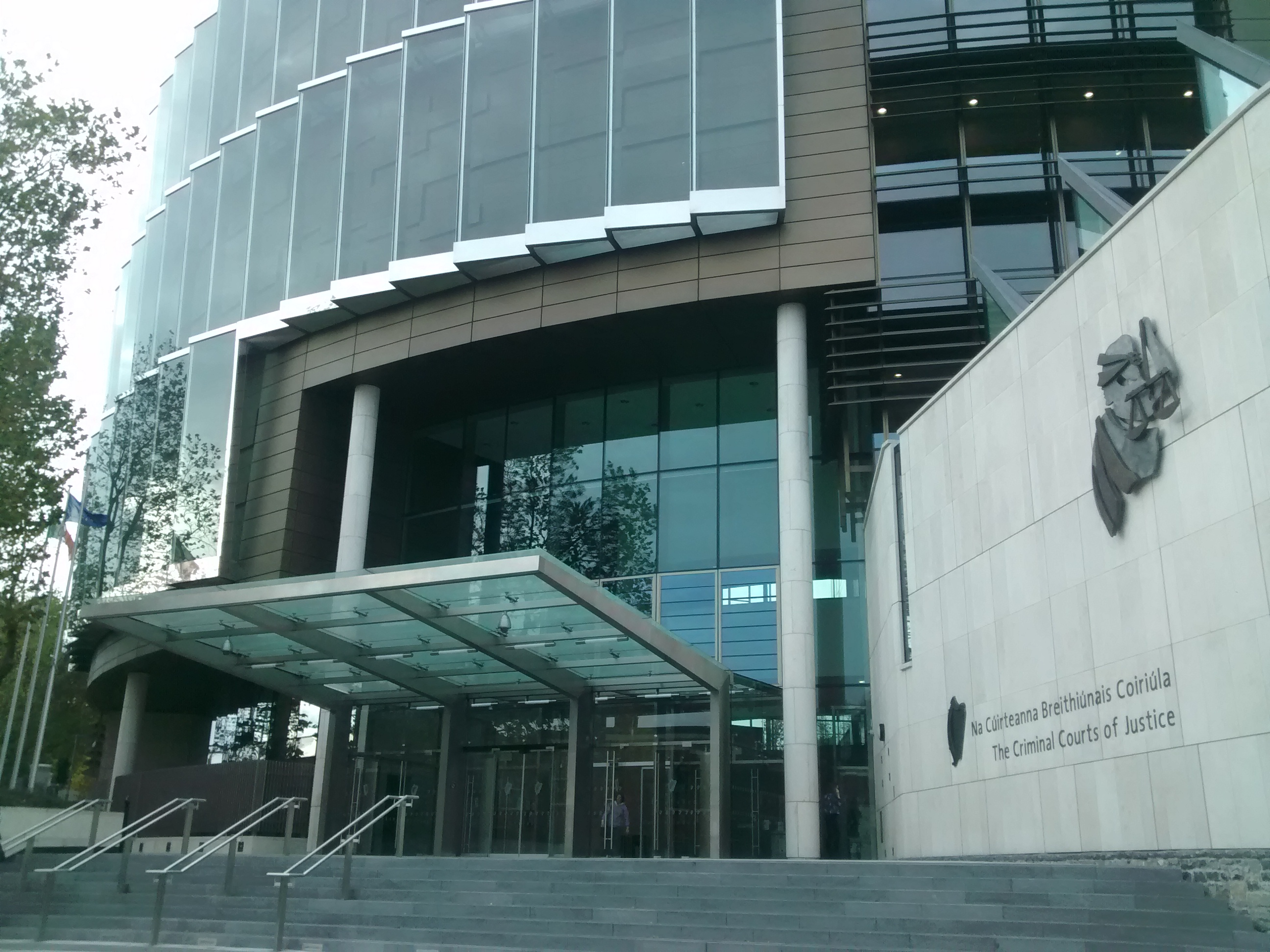
Entrance

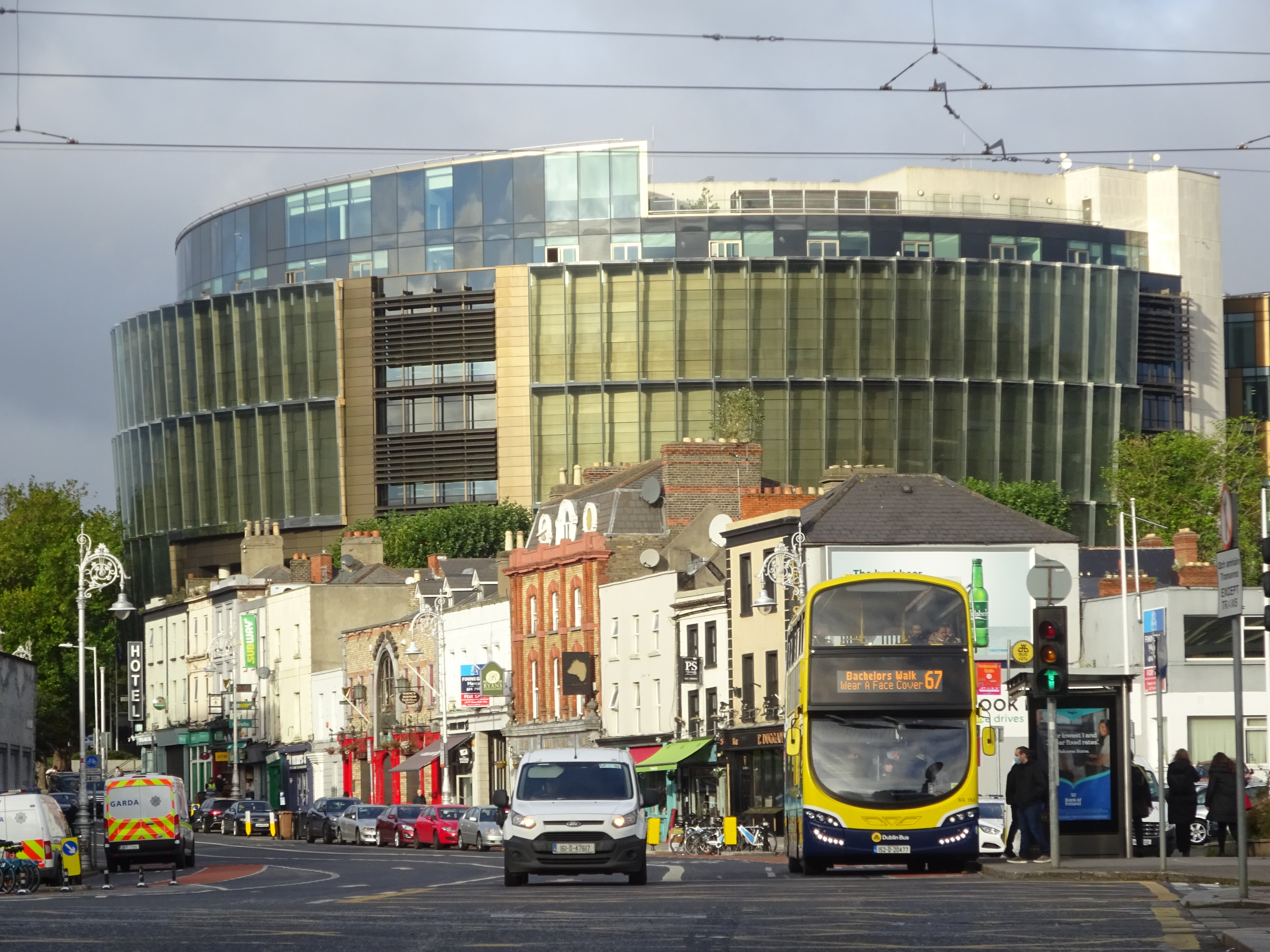
Another view of the building
