= Infirmary Road, Dublin =

Street in Dublin, Ireland

Infirmary Road
- Infirmary Road in autumn
- Interactive map of Infirmary Road
- Native name: Bóthar na hOtharlainne (Irish)
- Location: Dublin, Ireland
- Postal code: D07
- Coordinates: 53°21′01″N 6°17′46″W
- north end: North Circular Road
- south end: Parkgate Street

Other
- Known for: Royal Military Infirmary; Arbour Hill; People's Gardens; Criminal Courts of Justice, Dublin; Director of Public Prosecutions, headquarters

Infirmary Road (Irish: Bóthar na hOtharlainne) is a road on the northside of Dublin, Ireland. It connects Parkgate Street to the south with the North Circular Road to the north. The road, running broadly northwest-southeast, features the Phoenix Park's People's Gardens, Royal Military Infirmary and the side entrance to the Criminal Courts of Justice on the western side, and a former Royal Military Isolation Hospital on the eastern side.

== History ==
The road was named after the James Gandon-designed Royal Military Infirmary from the 1790s.

Bohemian Football Club was founded in the Gate Lodge, at the top of the road in 1890. The club played its first games in the park's Polo Grounds. Broadcaster Pat Kenny lived on the street as a child, when his father was an elephant keeper in the nearby Dublin Zoo.

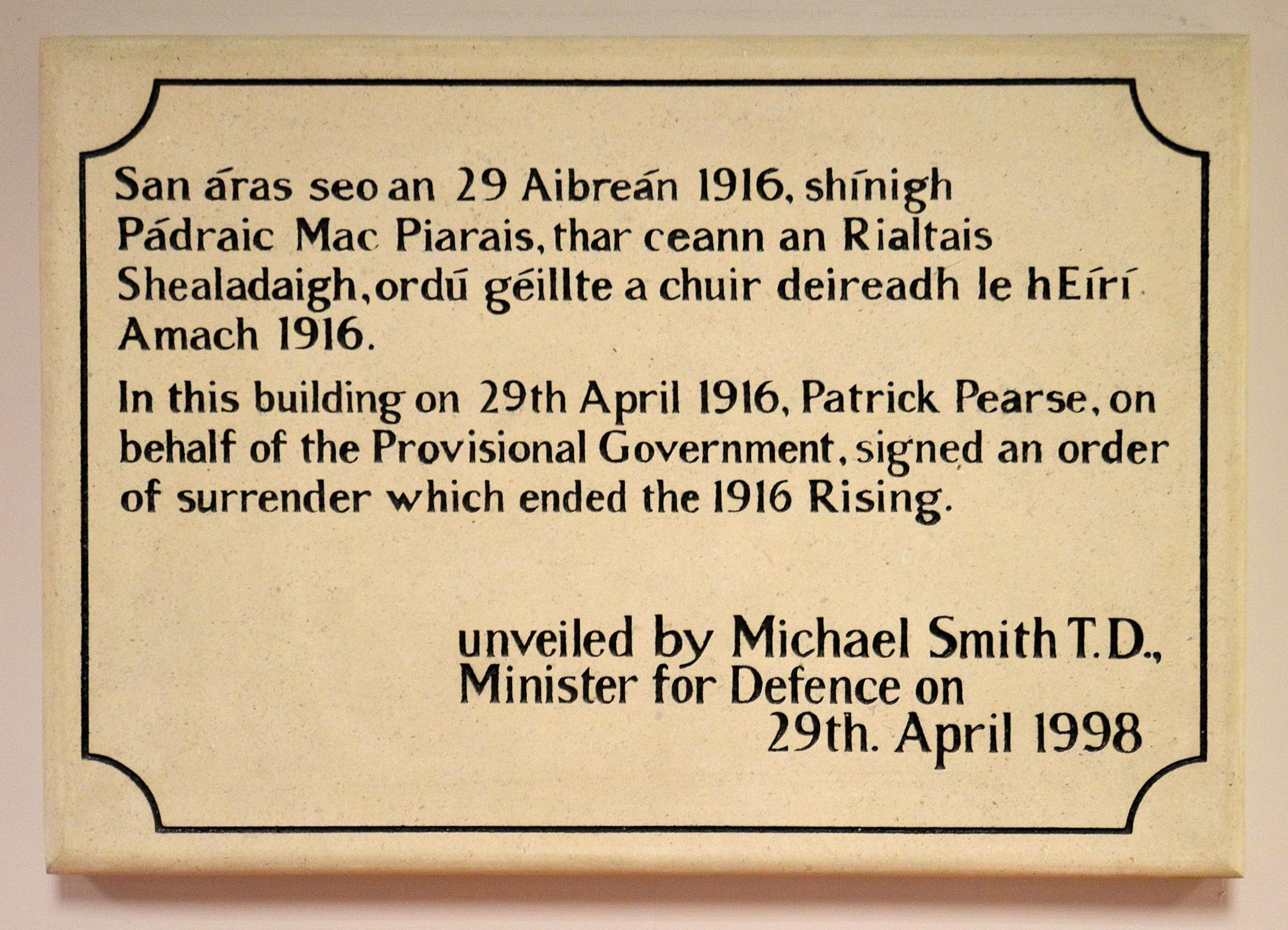
A plaque commemorating Pearse's surrender in person at the Royal Military Command on Infirmary Road

On 29 April 1916, Padraig Pearse formally surrendered to the British Army Irish Command at the Royal Military Command headquarters on Infirmary Road, ending the Easter Rising.

In the late 1990s, The Office of Public Works proposed to build the future national Convention Centre on the road. It was eventually built at Spencer Dock on the Dublin docks.

Dublin Bus's number 10 bus route had a terminus stop on the road. When it was replaced by an extended 46A bus, the terminus moved to the other side of the road, using Parkgate Street to turn around. The 46A was discontinued in 2025, and the number 11 now serves the stop.

== Gallery ==
The junction with Aberdeen Street

The former Isolation Hospital and Married Quarters building, photographed in 2006

Autumn leaves on the road

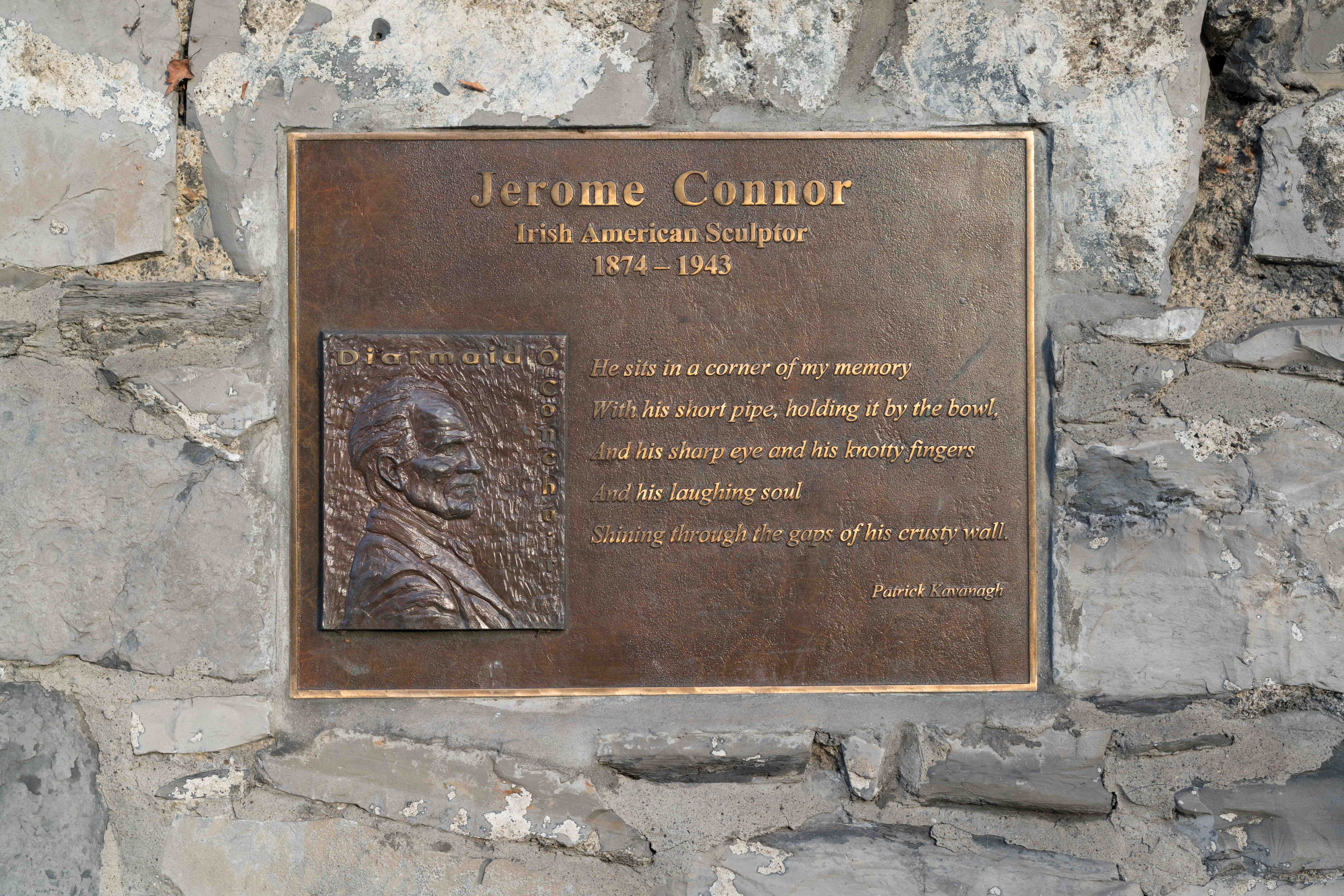
A dedication to the sculptor Jerome Connor, located on the road
