= Collins Barracks, Dublin =

Barracks building

- Dún Uí Choileáin, Baile Átha Cliath
- Dublin
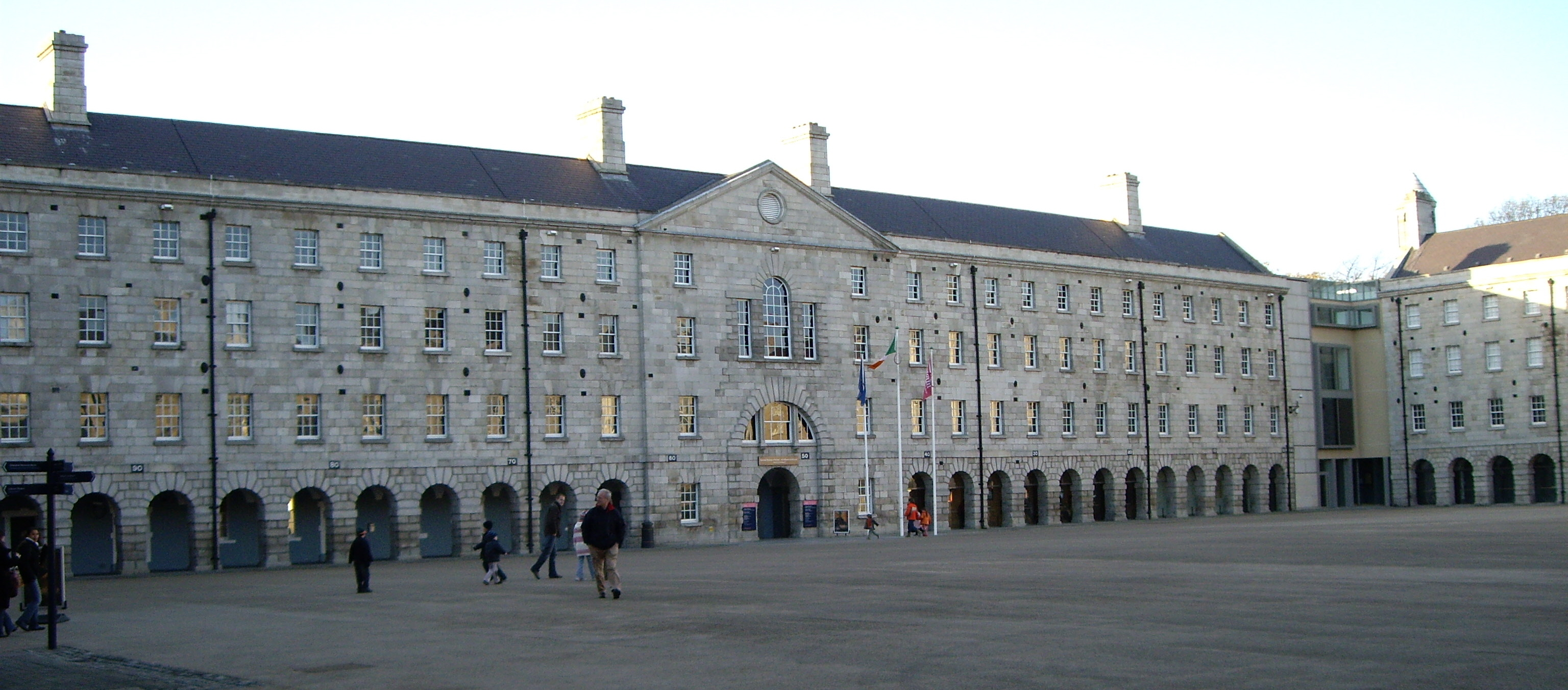
- The main barracks square of Collins Barracks

Site information
- Type: Barracks
- Operator: (Republic of Ireland) Irish Army

Location
- Location within Dublin
- Coordinates: 53.34837°N 6.28581°W

Site history
- Built: 1702
- Built for: War Office
- In use: 1702—1997

Collins Barracks (Irish: Dún Uí Choileáin) is a former military barracks in the Arbour Hill area of Dublin, Ireland. The buildings now house the National Museum of Ireland – Decorative Arts and History.

Previously housing first British Armed Forces and later Irish Army garrisons through three centuries, the barracks were the oldest continuously occupied example in the world. Built in 1702, and further extended in the late 18th century and 19th century, the complex's main buildings are neo-classical in style. Originally called simply The Barracks, and later the Royal Barracks, the name was changed in 1922 by the Irish Free State to Collins Barracks, in honour of Michael Collins, who had been killed earlier that year. Since 1997 the barracks have been home to collections of the National Museum of Ireland (for Decorative Arts and History exhibits), and the original structures have seen some award-winning redevelopment and conservation work to support this new role.

== History ==
=== 18th century to 1920s – British garrison ===
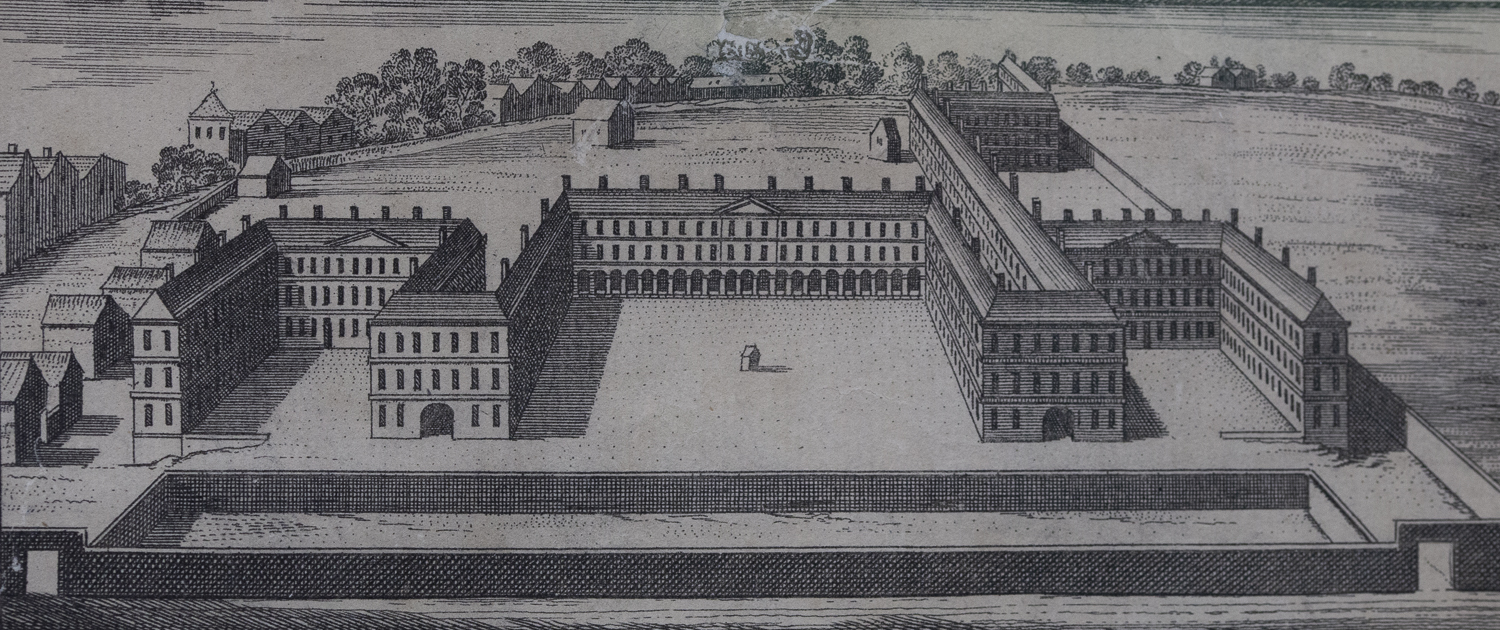
An early illustration of the barracks taken from Charles Brooking's map of Dublin (1728)

Save for the Royal Hospital Kilmainham, the barracks is the earliest public building in Dublin, and was built from 1701 by the then Surveyor General under Queen Anne, Thomas de Burgh. (Burgh was also the architect of the famous library building at Trinity College Dublin.)

Built on a site originally intended for a mansion of the Duke of Ormonde, the complex has several large squares, each open on the south side. The largest square (Clarke's Square) has arcaded colonnades on the east and west sides, and the main buildings are faced with granite.

The oldest inhabited barracks in Europe (and once one of the largest), it was originally known simply as the Barracks and later the Royal Barracks.

Wolfe Tone, one of the main leaders of the 1798 rebellion was held prisoner, court-martialled and convicted of treason at the Barracks.

Through the 19th century, up to 1,500 troops of various Regiments of Foot (and up to two troops of horse) were stationed at the barracks. However, by the 1880s conditions of accommodation were dangerously inadequate, and they were strongly criticised following an investigation by Commissioners of the War Office as levels of disease increased.

During the 1916 Easter Rising, the 10th Battalion of the Royal Dublin Fusiliers and other forces were deployed from the Royal Barracks to fight the insurgent Irish Citizen Army and Irish Volunteers who occupied strongly held positions close by on Usher's Island (under Seán Heuston), the Four Courts (under Ned Daly), and the GPO (under Pádraig Pearse).

=== 1920s to 1990s – Irish garrison ===
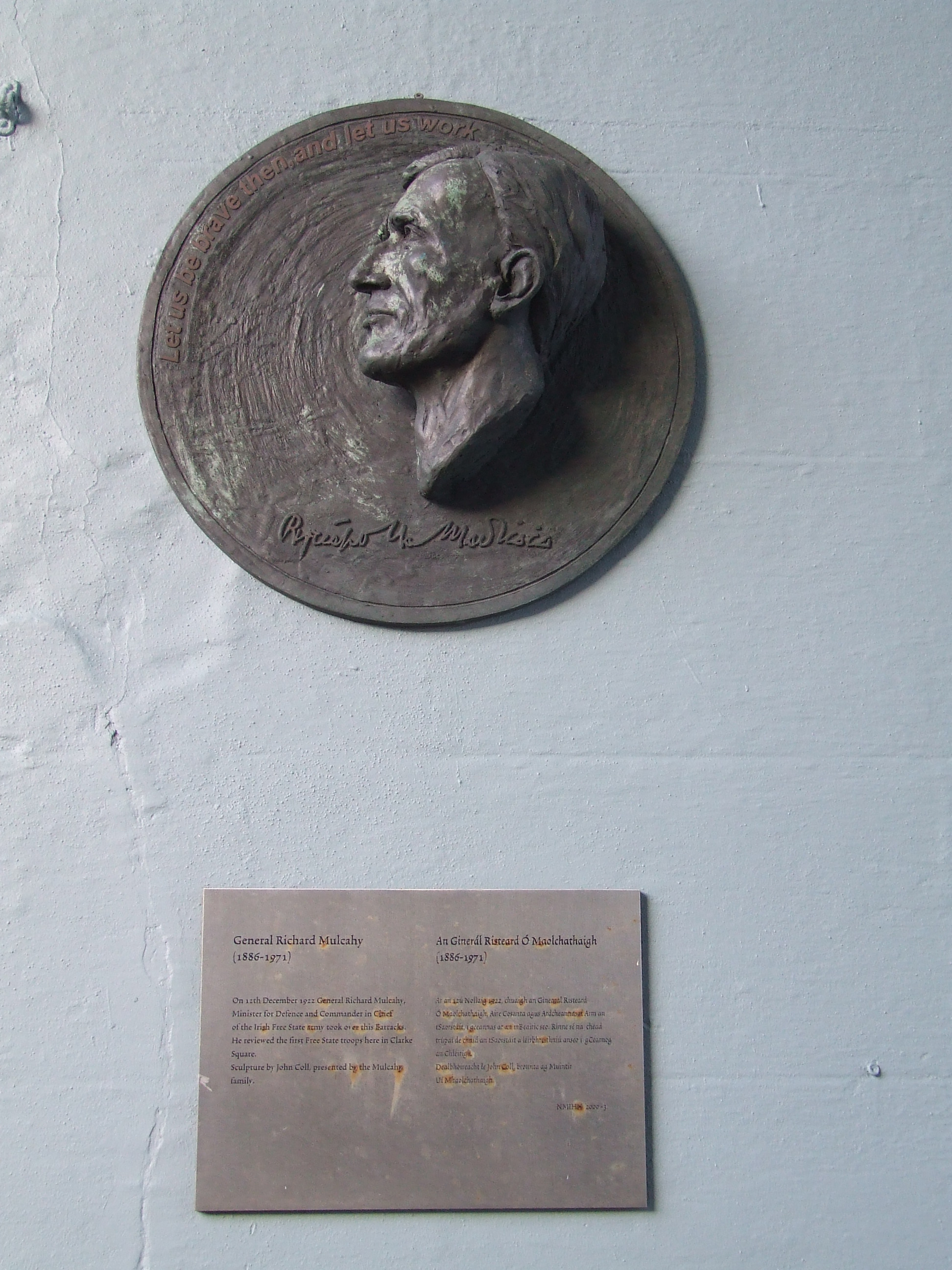
Bronze relief and plaque commemorating General Richard Mulcahy at Collins Barracks

Under the Anglo-Irish Treaty (which marked the end of the Irish War of Independence), the complex was handed over to troops of the Irish Free State in December 1922. It was almost immediately named Collins Barracks after Michael Collins, the first commander-in-chief of the Free State, who had been killed that year. The barracks housed forces of the Free State Army through the Irish Civil War and for 70 years was home to units of the Eastern Command of the Irish Defence Forces. The 5th Infantry Battalion marched out of the barracks for the last time in 1997.

The journal Museum Ireland wrote in 1995 of the ongoing preparations at the barracks as it was being converted to civilian use:

The first phase of refurbishment and conversion work for the National Museum of Ireland at the Clarke Square area of Collins Barracks has commenced. This is just the beginning of "a major project which, in accordance with a Government decision on the disposal of the Barracks, will eventually see the entire site transformed into a major National Museum facility". The intended move is being hailed as "the most significant development in the Museum's history since its foundation". It is hoped that the exhibition, storage, conservation and administrative facilities which will be provided at its new premises will address many of the long standing accommodation problems of the Museum and allow access "to the many treasures of our national heritage and culture which for too long have been locked away in storage" The establishment of a major cultural institution in that part of Dublin is also expected to boost the prospects for the regeneration of the area and add significantly to the quality of life there. £10 million of tax amnesty receipts were allocated by the Government in the 1994 Budget to enable the project to get off the ground.

=== 1997 to present – National Museum of Ireland ===
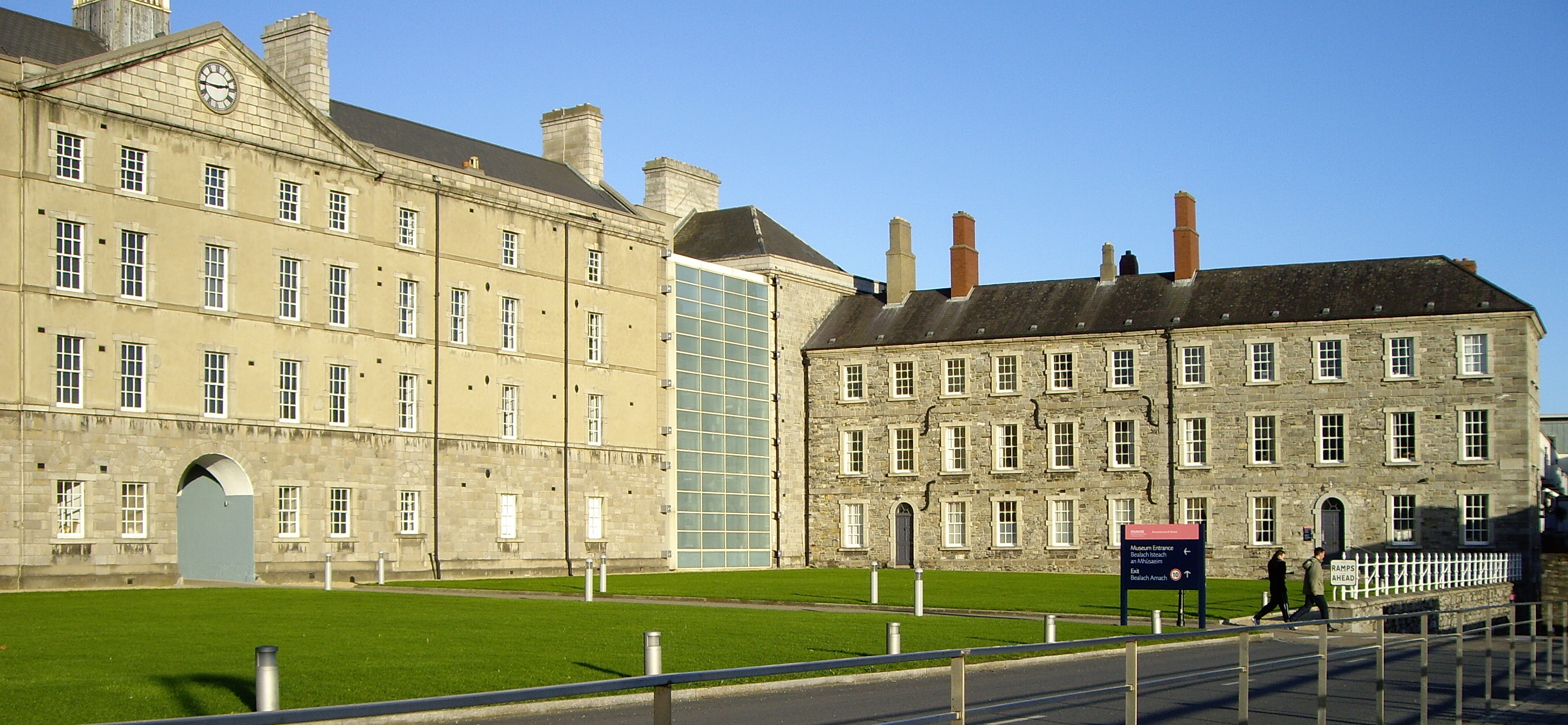
Entrance to the National Museum of Ireland, Collins Barracks

As part of de-militarisation, the barracks underwent considerable redevelopment – including the conversion and linking of two sides of Clarke Square with glass-faced structures. This work was awarded the country's premier award for architectural conservation, the Silver Medal for Conservation, by Royal Institute of the Architects of Ireland (RIAI).

Home to the Decorative Arts and History section of the National Museum, the museum also has galleries dedicated to exhibits on military history. However, the main focus of the galleries is on arts, crafts and wares, including exhibits on: Irish coins and currency, silverware, furniture, folklife and costumes, ceramics, glassware, etc.

== Prostitution ==
As with most garrison towns in Ireland, prostitution proliferated in areas surrounding barracks' as the impoverished inhabitants of cities and towns would gravitate towards the soldiers who were in receipt of a steady income. Barrack Street (renamed Benburb Street in 1890), which ran directly in front of the site, became associated with this sex work due to its close proximity to the Royal Barracks. The area was comparable to the Monto whose activities reached a zenith during the 1860s–1950s period and whose profits were also aided by the enormous number of British Army garrisons in the city over the centuries.

In 1837, 135 years after the barracks had been established, Barrack Street was described by a visitor as consisting of "a line of brothels and low public-houses" and "filled with the most abandoned crew of rogues and prostitutes which even all Dublin, with its unhappy pre-eminence in that species of population, can produce". In the late nineteenth century the street was chosen as the location for the first Dublin Corporation housing scheme, due to the cheaper cost of purchasing land in areas with long-standing social problems. The street remained a slum for most of the twentieth century, composed of overcrowded tenements and even after the transition of barracks to museum in 1997 the area remained a noted red light district. In May 1997, as many as 100 women were reported to be still working as prostitutes on Benburb Street.

== Film location ==
The barracks has featured in a number of film and television productions, notably Michael Collins. The rear of the barracks is often used as a period street setting for productions such as Ripper Street, Penny Dreadful and the RTÉ 1916 Rising mini-series Rebellion.

== See also ==
- Prostitution in the Republic of Ireland
- List of Irish military installations
