= Campaign furniture =

Type of furniture made for travel

Campaign furniture is a type of furniture which is made for travel. Historically, much of it was made for military campaigns.

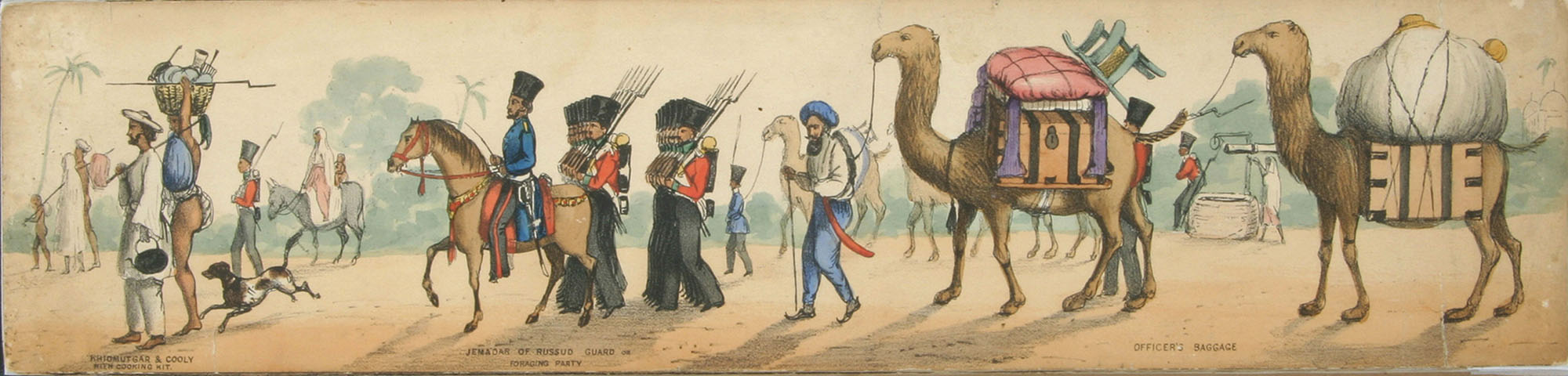
Line of March of a Bengal Regiment of Infantry in Scinde, showing furniture packed onto camels c. 1843

== Description ==
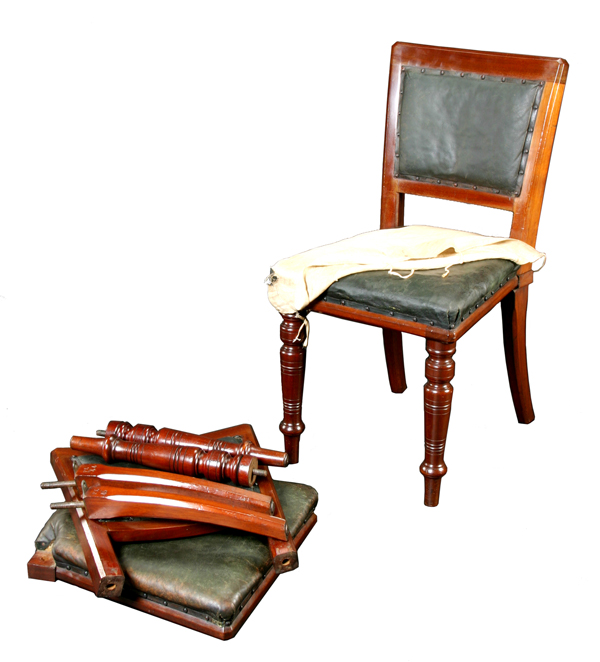
A pair of campaign chairs by Ross & Co. of Dublin

Any furniture specifically made to break down or fold for ease of travel can be described as campaign furniture. It was designed to be packed up and carried on the march. It has been used by traveling armies since the time of Julius Caesar, but it is commonly associated with British Army officers, many of whom had purchased their commissions. With the rise and expansion of the British Empire in the 19th and 20th centuries the demand by the military, administrators and colonists increased. British officers of high social position in the Georgian and Victorian periods (1714–1901) often carried high-quality portable furniture.

The most common item of campaign furniture is the chest of drawers, often referred to as a military chest or campaign chest. Campaign chests' primary wood was often mahogany, teak, or camphor, although cedar, pine and other woods were also used. The dominant type breaks down into two sections, and has removable feet. The brass corners and strapwork offer some protection and typify the distinctive "campaign look".

A similar type of furniture was made for naval service and even for merchant ships, which allowed furnishings to be used in port or peacetime, but stowed out of harm's way in action, or during rough weather. Naval furniture is often extremely small, reflecting the cramped quarters available on ship. (Some sea-going pieces were also made for frequent travelers, or intended for permanent use after the journey.) Seagoing furniture sometimes has fiddle rails to prevent items from sliding off top surfaces; the fiddles were often themselves removable, with brass mounting sockets for the fiddle pins.

Some items of campaign furniture are instantly recognizable as made to dismantle or fold. Brass caps to the tops of legs, hinges in unusual places, protruding bolts or X-frame legs all give clues to the functionality of the piece. However, some pieces were designed to be up to date and fashionable. In such cases, as much of it looked like domestic furniture, it is harder to see how it dismantles. Ross and Co. of Dublin were innovators of campaign furniture design and much of their work is obviously Victorian in period. It only becomes apparent that their balloon back chairs dismantle when they are turned upside down and two locking bolts can be seen.

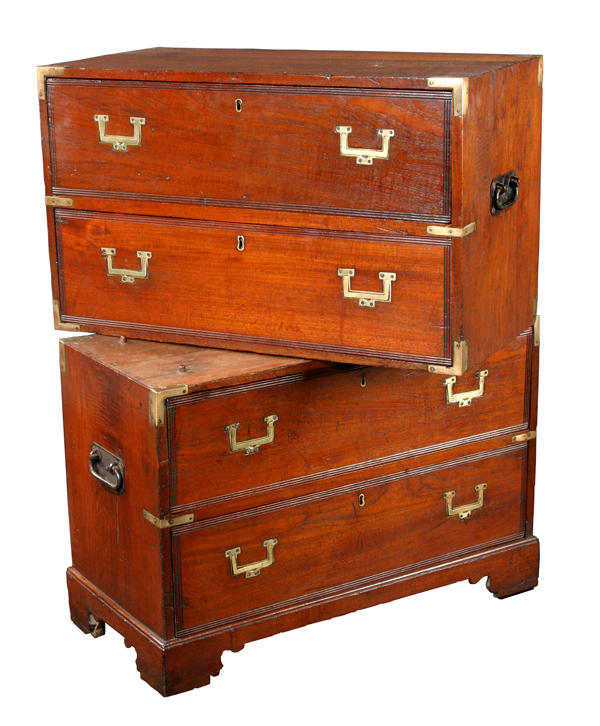
Anglo Indian Campaign or military chest

== Examples ==
An old copy of The Army & Navy Co-Operative Society Limited's catalogue will show that there was a large variety of items, from portable beds to collapsible candlesticks (also known as Brighton Buns), that were available to ease life for the soldier or traveller by the end of the 19th century.

There seemed no limit to the number of items an officer would take with him if he could afford to and how well one's tent was kitted out could indicate social standing. William Howard Russell of The Times noted on 2 February 1858 in his diary: "Sir Colin Campbell's baggage &c. extended for eighteen miles, when he came down from Lucknow".

The numerous items specifically made for travel include a variety of types of bed from four poster or tent beds to chairs that would extend for sleeping; large dining tables, dining chairs, easy chairs, sofas and couches, chests of drawers, book cabinets, washstands, wardrobes, shelves, desks, mirrors, lanterns and candlesticks, canteens of silver, cooking equipment, toiletry equipment, and box-seats for chamber pots were all made to be portable.

By the mid-19th century the demand for campaign furniture encouraged makers to invent unusual and interesting pieces that offer a surprise in the ease with which they dismantle or the compactness of their storage. Tables were cleverly hinged to fold down into a box the size of a briefcase; chess board boxes would contain tripod legs and a telescopic column to convert into a table; chairs would break down to a minimal size, and even convert into a sedan-chair. The driver of this invention was the need for each piece to pack up quickly into a portable package with minimal complication.

A number of pieces of domestic furniture are commonly mis-described as campaign simply because they have handles to the sides, are metamorphic or dual-purpose. Some campaign furniture certainly had these attributes but there was also much furniture produced with these qualities that was never intended for travel. Sometimes handles were added to pieces of furniture simply to make them easier to move from one part of the room to another. Metamorphic or dual-purpose furniture was also popular for bachelors who typically had smaller lodgings and had to make use of their limited space. A library table that turned into a set of steps would also be useful in a larger house that did not want the steps constantly on view. It is often thought that the Wellington Chest must be a piece of campaign furniture because it was named for the 1st Duke of Wellington. The vast majority were not made with travel in mind as they have over hanging mouldings or bases etc. It is forgotten that Wellington also had a distinguished life away from the battlefield. The seven drawers (one for each day of the week) enabled him to organise his business as a politician.

== Manufacturers ==
The Army & Navy Stores followed on from a strong British tradition of innovative and practical design in portable furniture that had its roots in the 18th century and grew as the British Empire expanded. Much of the early portable furniture would have been bespoke (made to order). It would not have been uncommon for a soldier to ask his local cabinet maker to take a domestic design and adapt it for travel. As demand grew, a number of well known designers, including Chippendale, Sheraton and Gillows, considered portable furniture and the end of the 18th century saw the rise of specialist makers with the names of Thomas Butler and Morgan & Sanders perhaps being the most recognised. The number of such specialists increased in the 19th century and this was fuelled not only by military needs but also the increase of people moving to the colonies. The Victorians and Edwardian were particularly concerned with improving design to its utmost practicality and the patents relating to furniture greatly increased in the second half of the 19th century. Aside from cabinet makers, it was a natural addition for a number of companies such as J.W. Allen , Day & Son, John Pound and Hill & Millard , who all started out as luggage makers, to expand their trunk making businesses and develop a strong line in demountable furniture.

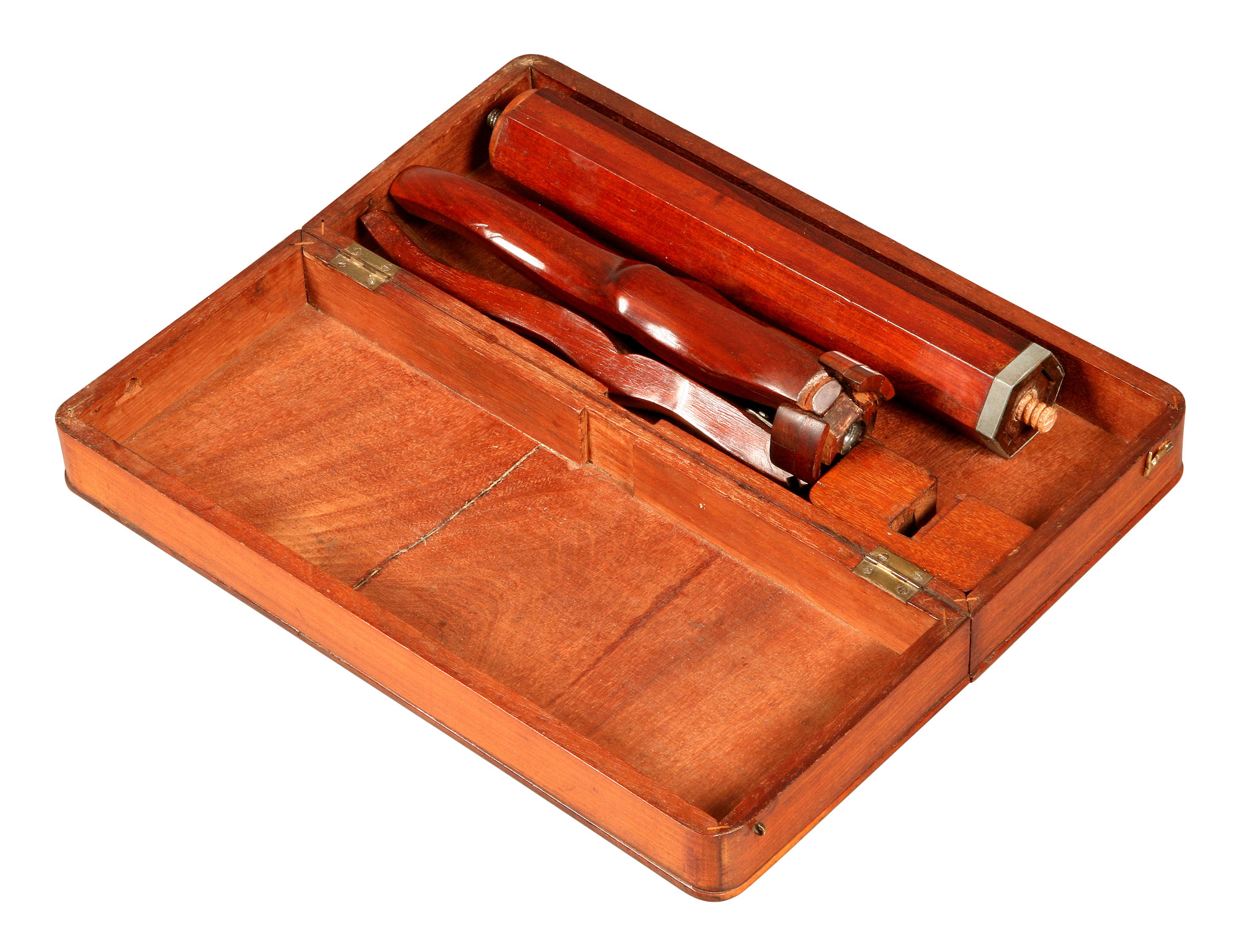
A portable games table, packed down into its top which becomes a box case

One of the other main campaign furniture makers in the 19th century were Ross & Co Dublin who were considered " The Victorian Army’s Cabinet Maker of Choice."

By the mid-19th century it was possible to buy a complete Barrack Room Outfit from several London firms. More often than not this would consist of a Douro chair with packing case that would convert to a table, a washstand that would pack down into a hip bath, a camp bed and a chest of drawers with packing cases that would form a wardrobe.

== Demise ==
The beginning of the 20th century saw changes in the way war was conducted. The British had been taught a lesson by the Boers in South Africa, who could move quickly; and they discovered that their mobile units were not quite as mobile as they had thought. In 1903, the Secretary of State for War, H. O. Arnold-Forster, stated, "The British Army is a social institution prepared for every emergency except that of war." The new century also saw developments in transport and the rise of the motor car meant that travel was quicker making it less of a necessity to equip oneself for a long journey. There was a decrease in the demand for campaign furniture.

Portable furniture was still used for sporting events and shooting parties but it was less acceptable as an officer to have a large baggage train. Appreciation of the furniture for its practicality in domestic life had grown as the 19th century marched on. Although it still had a market it wasn't as strong as it had once. Many of the independent makers of campaign furniture started to disappear in the early 1900s, superseded by the one stop shops such as Army & Navy Stores and Harrods.

While personal furniture faded from military use, field desks, field filing systems, medical and maintenance storage systems, and similar portable equipment continue in use until the present day; some show continuity in design.

== Legacy ==
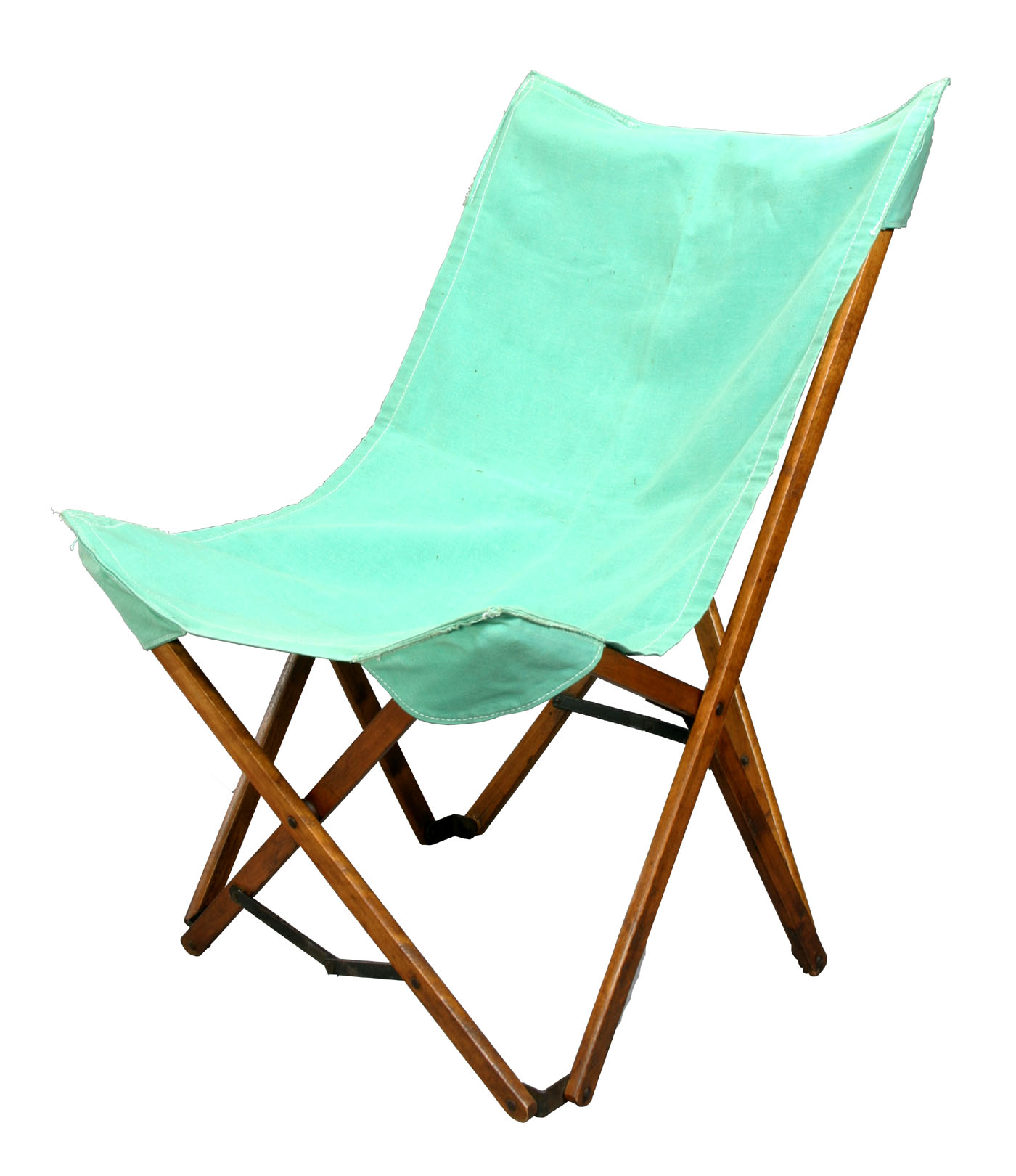
A Paragon Chair c. 1900

The need for campaign furniture to be sturdy and efficiently broken down gave rise to design that was often ahead of its time. A number of chairs that we today consider to be design icons of the 20th century were actually inspired by campaign furniture from the end of the 19th century. The Roorkhee chair was designed by British Army Engineers stationed at the town of the same name in India. It became instantly popular for its simple but practical construction. Kaare Klint recognised its qualities and made a version of the Roorkhee called the Safari Chair in 1933. The Paragon Chair folds down to a very compact size once the canvas seat is removed and the Harrods catalogue of 1895 described it as "the most Portable Chair in the Market". This chair was first designed by Fenby and patented on 22 March 1877 but it has been re-designed since under different names. Italian officers used a version in Ethiopia in the 1930s which was known as the Tripolina. In 1940, Jorge Ferrari Hardoy, Juan Kurchan and Antonia Bonet designed the well known Butterfly chair, made of dismantling metal sections and clearly inspired by the Paragon. Knoll International made a version called the Hardoy and today the Conran Shop sell a version called the Bush chair.

Campaign furniture is evocative of luxurious travel and a time gone by. There is more likely to be an owner's or maker's name on a piece of portable furniture than a domestic version and it is easier to put it into a social context. Modern furniture made in a campaign style is produced by a number of makers today. Often, the consideration of portability has not been a factor with the overriding concern being to achieve the look by adding brass corners and strapwork. Another group of manufacturers have produced direct copies of period campaign furniture, seeing that there is still a call for it today be it for safaris or the high-class camper.

The characteristics of campaign furniture allow it to be practical, versatile, and easily moved.

== Bibliography ==
- Brawer, Nicholas A. (September 2000). "Victorian campaign furniture - furniture used on military campaigns in the 1800s". Magazine Antiques. 158 (3). Archived from the original on May 5, 2005 – via FindArticles.
- Camp Furniture of the Victorian Officer - Army Museum '81, Edited by Elizabeth Talbot Rice and Alan Guy. National Army Museum.
- Exhibition of Travelling and Campaigning Furniture 1790 - 1850, Phillips of Hitchin (Antiques) Ltd, June 1984.
- Exhibition of Furniture for Travel 1760 - 1860, Phillips of Hitchin (Antiques) Ltd, June 1987.
- Ross & Co. of Dublin: The Victorian Army's Cabinet Maker of Choice, Sean Clarke & Nicholas Brawer, Ireland's Antiques & Period Properties, Vol. 1 No. 3 Summer/ Autumn 2004.
- War Cabinets, Amin Jaffer, Country Life December 30, 2004.
- At Ease Gentlemen: A catalogue of 18th, 19th & early 20th Century Campaign Furniture and Travel Equipment. Christopher Clarke Antiques, October 2003
- The Portable Empire: A catalogue of 18th, 19th & early 20th Century Campaign Furniture and Travel Equipment. Christopher Clarke Antiques, October 2004
- Essential Baggage: A catalogue of 18th, 19th & early 20th Century Campaign Furniture and Travel Equipment. Christopher Clarke Antiques, October 2005
- Furniture Fit For Heroes: A catalogue of 18th, 19th & early 20th Century Campaign Furniture and travel Equipment. Christopher Clarke Antiques, October 2006
- The Quartermaster General: A catalogue of 18th, 19th & early 20th Century Campaign Furniture and Travel Equipment. Christopher Clarke Antiques, October 2008
- Nicholas A. Brawer, 2001. British Campaign Furniture: Elegance Under Canvas, 1740 - 1914. ISBN 0-8109-5711-6
- S. Northcote-Bade, 1971. Colonial Furniture in New Zealand. ISBN 0-589-00683-5
- Yesterday's Shopping: The Army & Navy Stores Catalogue 1907, Introduced by Alison Adburgham, David & Charles Reprints.
