= List of furniture types =

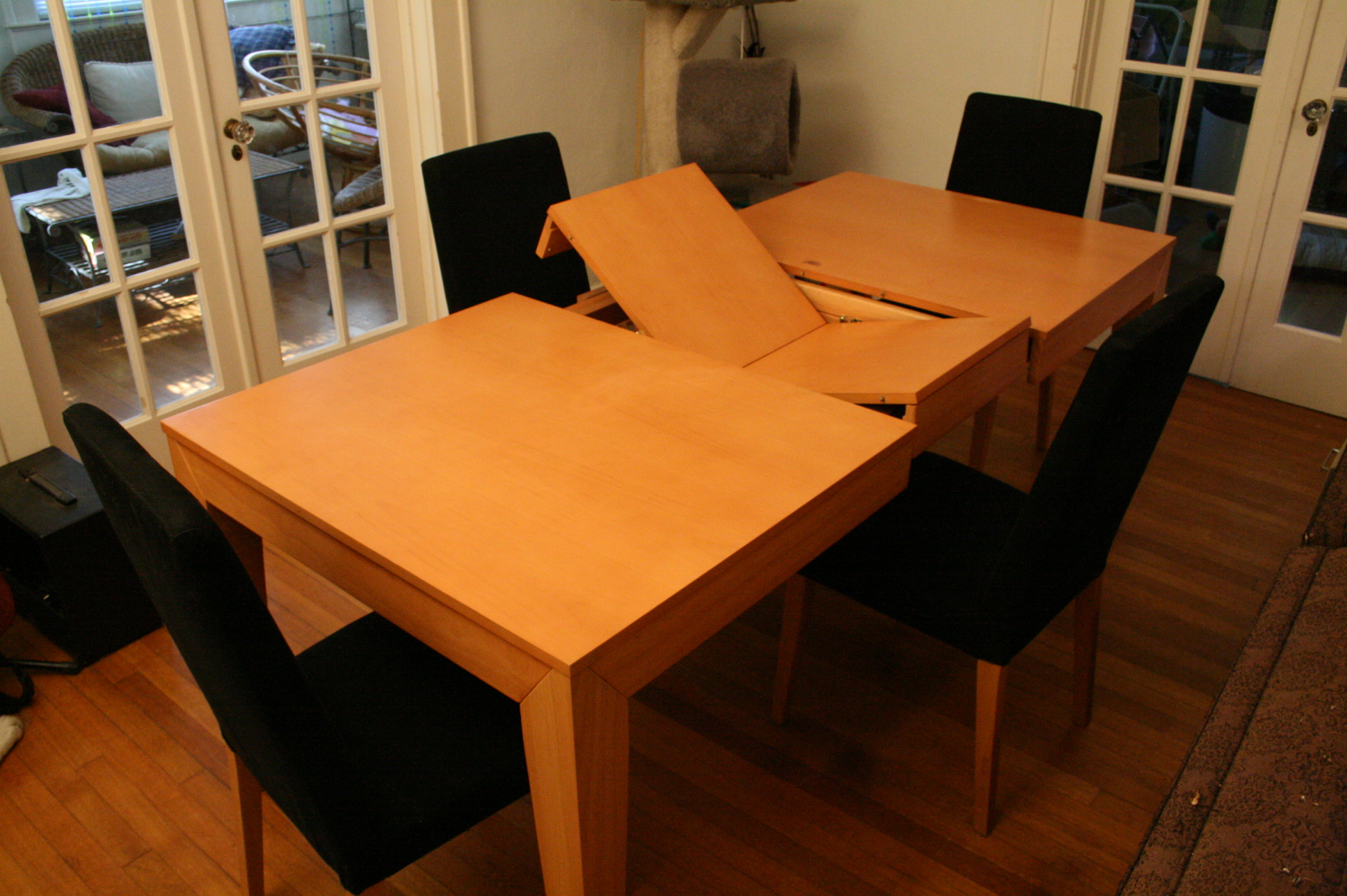
An expandable table with chairs

This is a list of furniture types. Furniture can be free-standing or built-in to a building. They typically include pieces such as chairs, tables, storage units, and desks.

These objects are usually kept in a house or other building to make it suitable or comfortable for living or working in.

== Seating ==
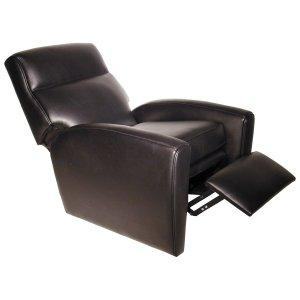
A recliner

=== Single seat ===
- Chair
- Office chair
- Lift chair
- Bean bag chair
- Chaise longue
- Fauteuil
- Ottoman
- Recliner
- Stool
  - Bar Stool
- Footstool or ottoman
- Tuffet
- Fainting couch
- Rocking chair
- Bar chair
- Poufy
- Arm Chair

=== Multiple seats ===
- Bench
- Couch, also known as a sofa or settee
  - Accubita
  - Canapé
  - Davenport
  - Klinai
- Divan
- Love seat
- Chesterfield

== Sleeping or lying ==
- Bed
  - Bunk bed
  - Canopy bed
  - Four-poster bed
  - Murphy bed
  - Platform bed
  - Sleigh bed
  - Waterbed
- Daybed
- Futon
- Hammock
- Headboard
- Infant bed (crib, cradle)
- Sofa bed
- Toddler bed

== Entertainment ==
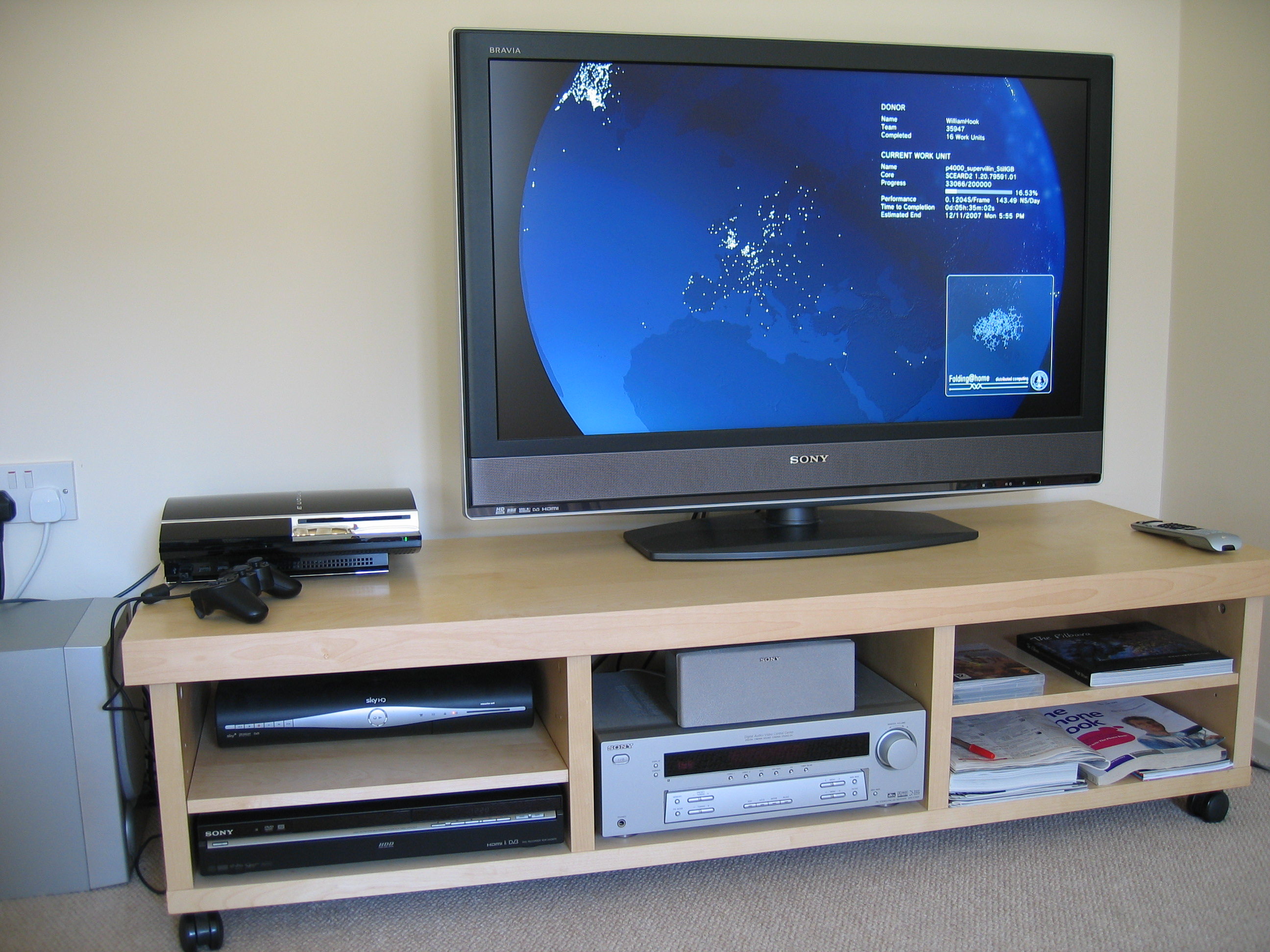
Contemporary (2007) home entertainment center

- Billiard table
- Celestial globe
- Chess table
- Entertainment center
- Gramophone
- Hi-fi
- Jukebox
- Pinball machine
- Radiogram
- Home bar
- Radio receiver
- Piano
- TV

== Tables ==
- Countertop
- Chabudai
- Changing table
- Desk
  - Computer desk
  - Davenport desk
  - Drawing board
  - Writing desk
  - Pedestal desk
    - Kneehole desk
  - Secretary desk
- Dressing table
  - Lowboy
- Kotatsu
- Korsi
- Monks bench
- Soban
- Table
  - Coffee table
  - Dining table
  - Drop-leaf table
  - End table
  - Folding table
  - Game table
  - Gateleg table
  - Poker table
  - Refectory table
  - Trestle table
  - TV tray table
  - Wine table
  - Sewing table
- Washstand
- Workbench

== Storage ==
- Baker's rack
- Bookcase
- Cabinetry
  - Bathroom cabinet
  - Chifforobe
  - Closet
  - Credenza
  - Cupboard
  - Curio cabinet
  - Gun cabinet
  - Hutch
  - Hoosier cabinet
  - Kitchen cabinet
  - Liquor cabinet
  - Pantry
  - Pie safe
  - Stipo a bambocci
  - Sideboard
- Chest of drawers or dresser
- Chest
  - Cellarette
  - Hope chest
- Coat rack
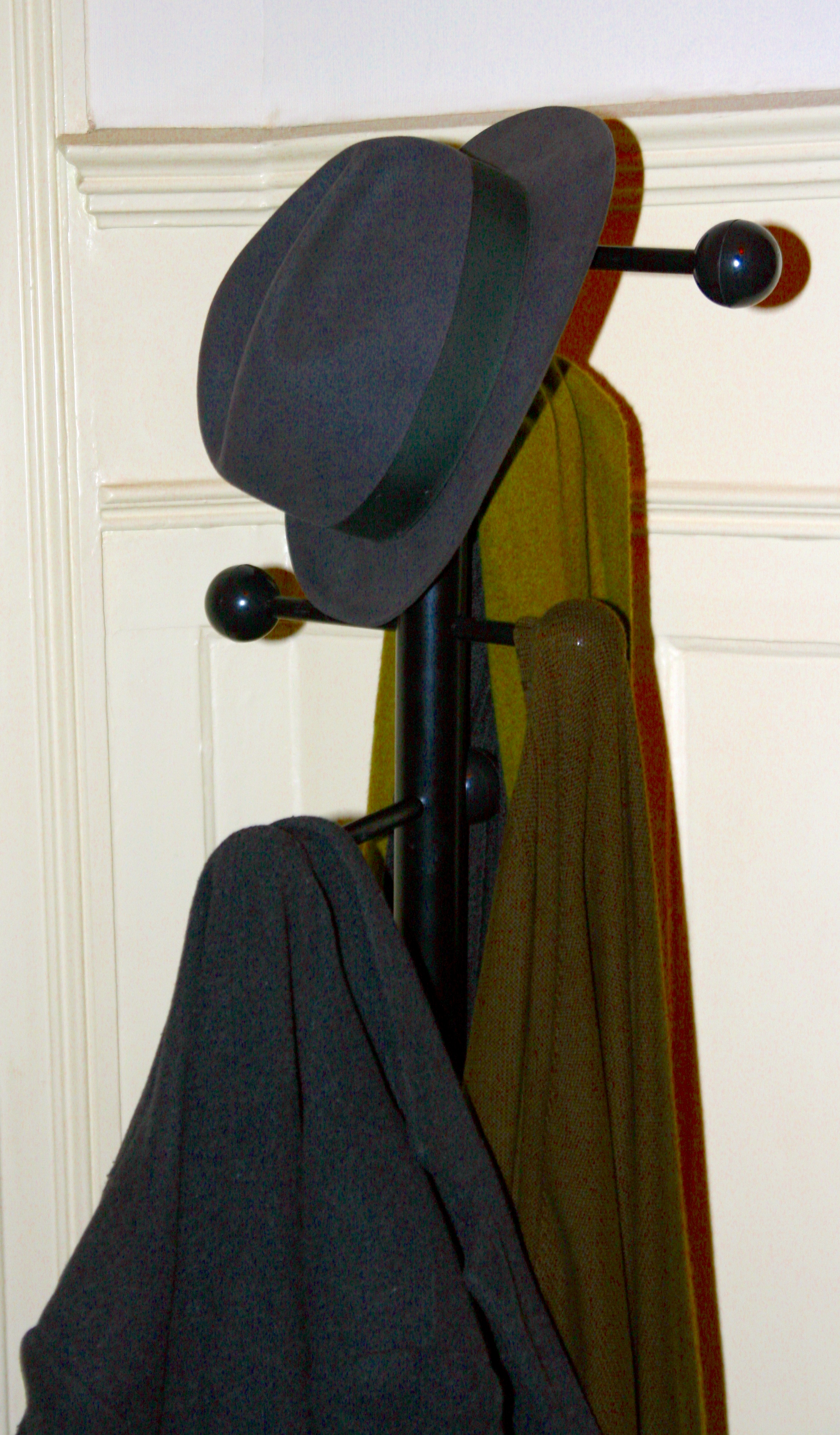
  A coat rack
- Drawer (furniture)
  - Hall tree
- Hatstand
- Bar cabinet
- Filing cabinet
- Floating shelf
- Lowboy
- Nightstand
- Ottoman
- Plan chest
- Plant stand
- Shelving
- Sideboard or buffet
- Tallboy
- Umbrella stand
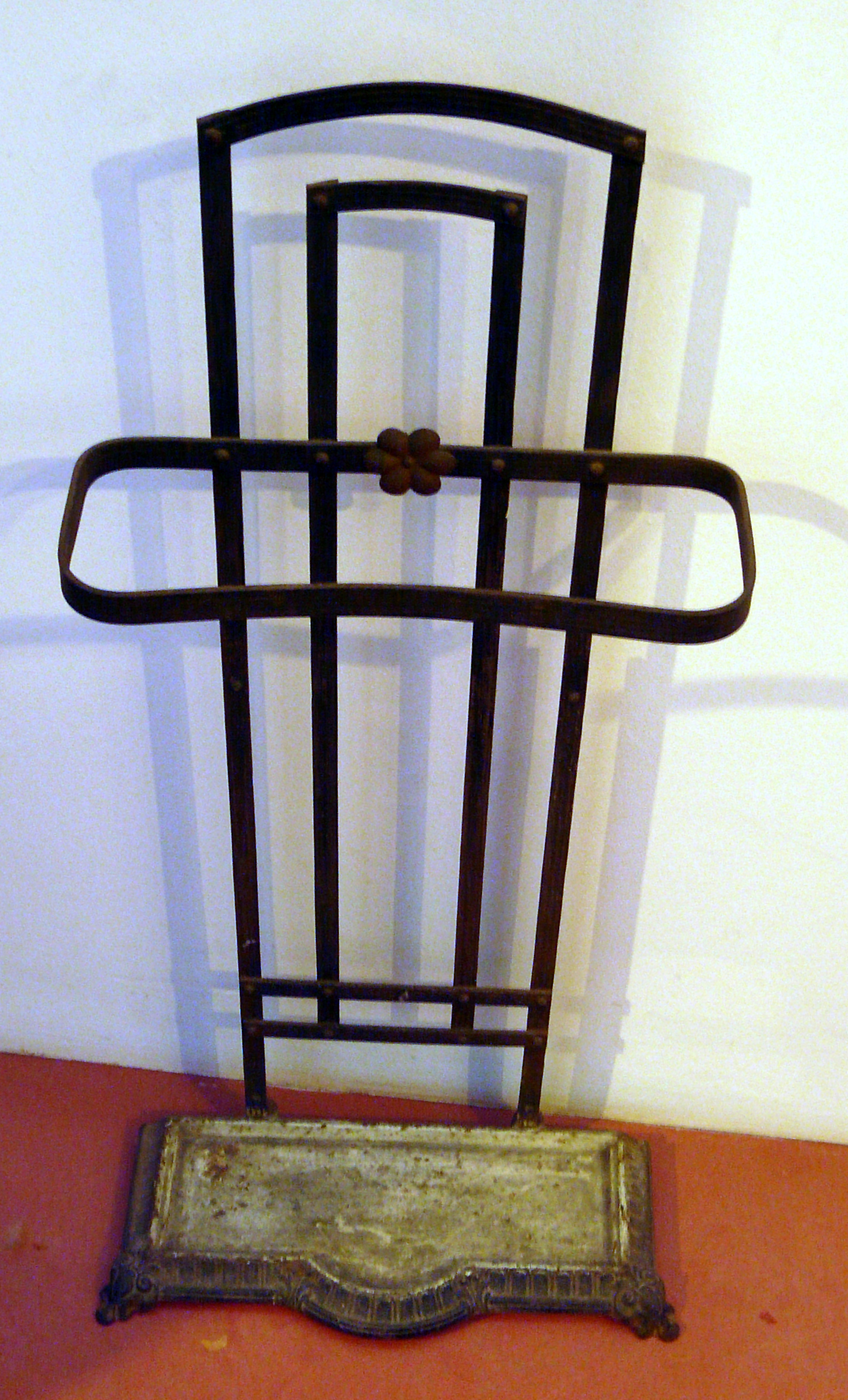
  An umbrella stand
- Wardrobe or armoire
- Wine rack
- Commode

== Religious ==
- Lectern
  - Eagle lectern
- Pulpit
- Rehal

== Sets ==
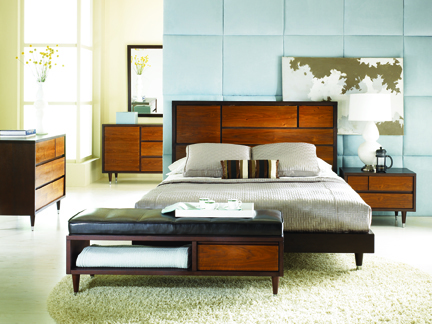
A bedroom set

- Bedroom set (group)
- Dinette (group)
- Dining set
- Vanity set
- Portable Lamps
- Patio set

== Types classified by materials ==
- Wooden furniture
- Bamboo furniture
- Wicker or rattan furniture
- Metal furniture
- Plastic furniture, also known as acrylic furniture
- Glass furniture
- Concrete furniture
- Bombay furniture, also known as blackwood furniture

== Other ==
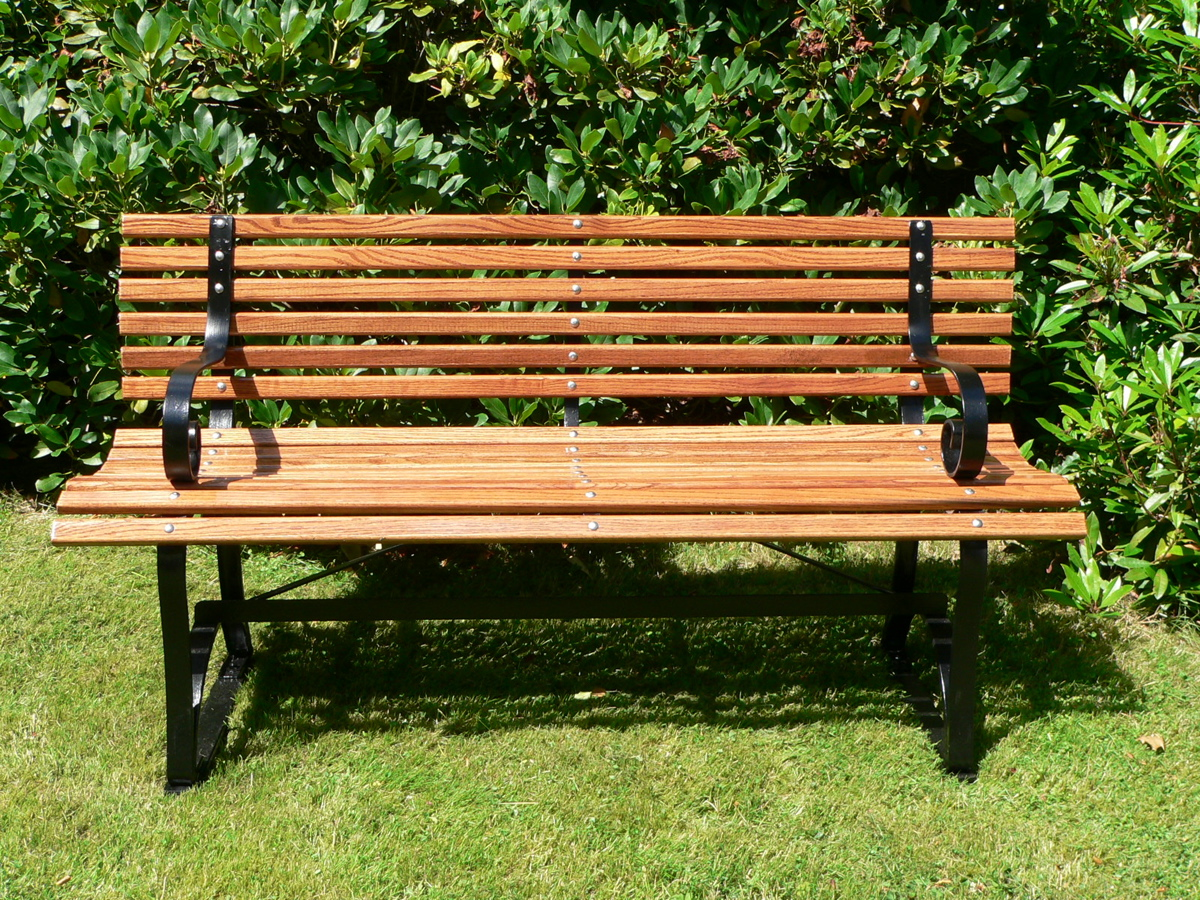
A garden bench

=== Definition 1: Objects usually kept in a house or other building to make it suitable or comfortable for living or working in ===
- Built-in furniture (see Frank Lloyd Wright)
- Campaign furniture – furniture specifically designed to break down or fold for ease of travel
- Clothes valet
- Credenza
- Divider, shōji or partition
- Folding screen
- Garden furniture
- Lamps are covered under furnishings or lighting.
- Taboret
- Tatami mats used for sitting
- Work furniture

=== Definition 2: Accessories or fittings that are required for a particular function, situation, or setting ===
- Aquarium furniture
- Bar furniture
- Children's furniture
- Door furniture
- Hutch
- Park furniture (such as benches and picnic tables)
- Stadium seating
- Street furniture
- Sword furniture – on Japanese swords (katana, wakizashi, tantō) all parts save the blade are referred to as "furniture".
- In firearms, parts aside from the action and barrel, such as the grip, stock, butt, and comb.

== See also ==
- A Taxonomy of Office Chairs
- Bedrooms
- Casegoods
- Decorative arts
- Living room
- List of chairs
- List of furniture designers
- Occasional furniture
- Upholstery
- Wood finishing
