= Medicine cabinet =

Cabinet used to store medications and other hygiene products

3D-illustration of a medicine cabinet.

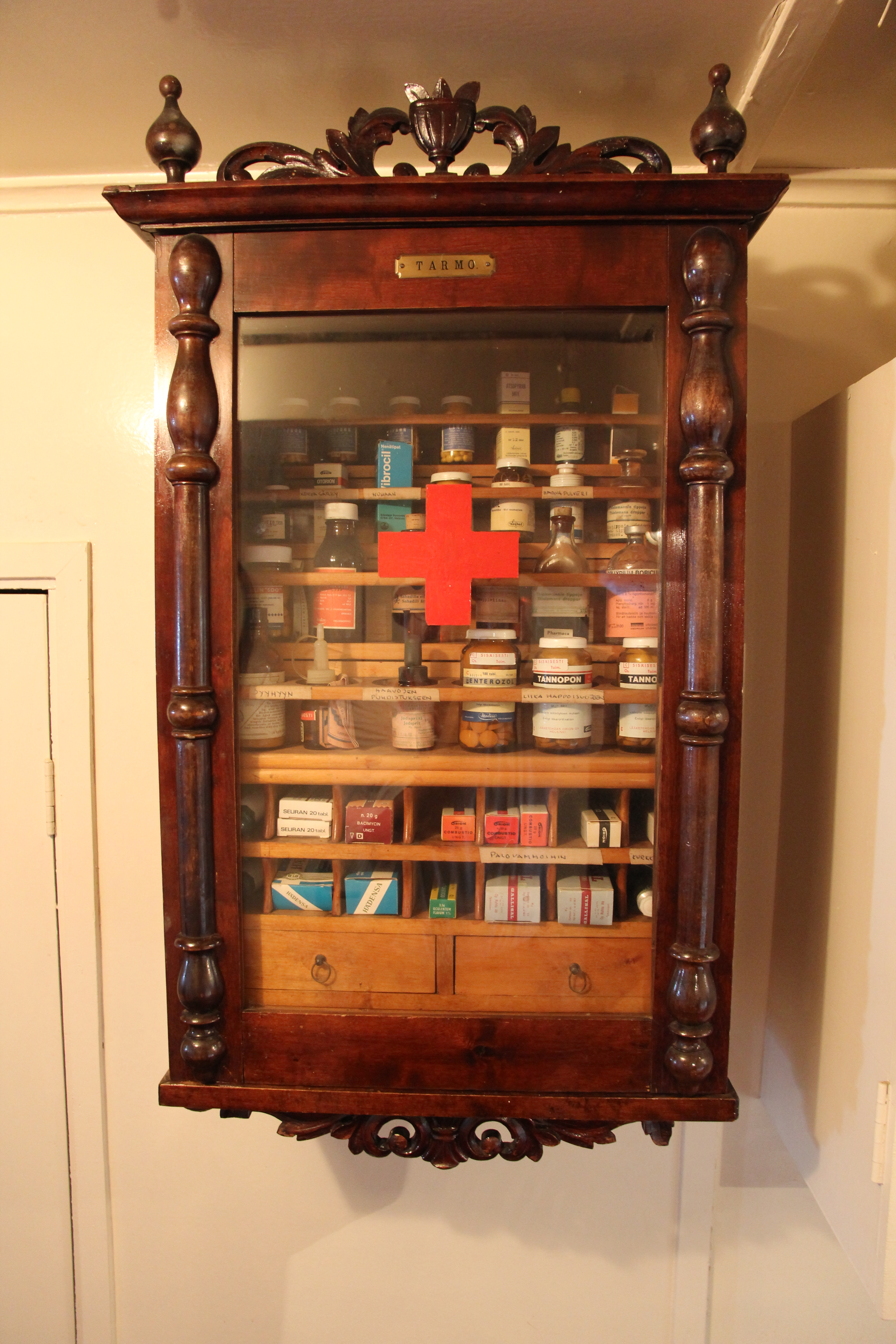
Picture of an older medicine cabinet.

A medicine cabinet is a cabinet used to store medications and other hygiene products. They are often locked and placed high enough such that it can not be accessed by small children. Medicine cabinets can be placed in many different places depending on the intended use and available space, and can for instance be found in workshops, bathrooms or hallways. Non-lockable bathroom cabinets are sometimes used as improvised medicine cabinets.

== Access ==
Many medicines can be dangerous if ingested in large doses or used incorrectly, and to avoid misuse by small children in particular, medicine cabinets are usually mounted high enough above the floor so that they can only be reached by adults. Medicine cabinets also often have locks, which restricts access by both adults and children. A drawback of having a locked medicine cabinet is in the event that the cabinet is locked and its contents are needed urgently. First aid kits should therefore be kept separately outside of lockable medicine cabinets.

== See also ==
- List of furniture types
- Shelf (storage)
- Toiletry kit
