= Nimura & Sato =

American furniture manufacture

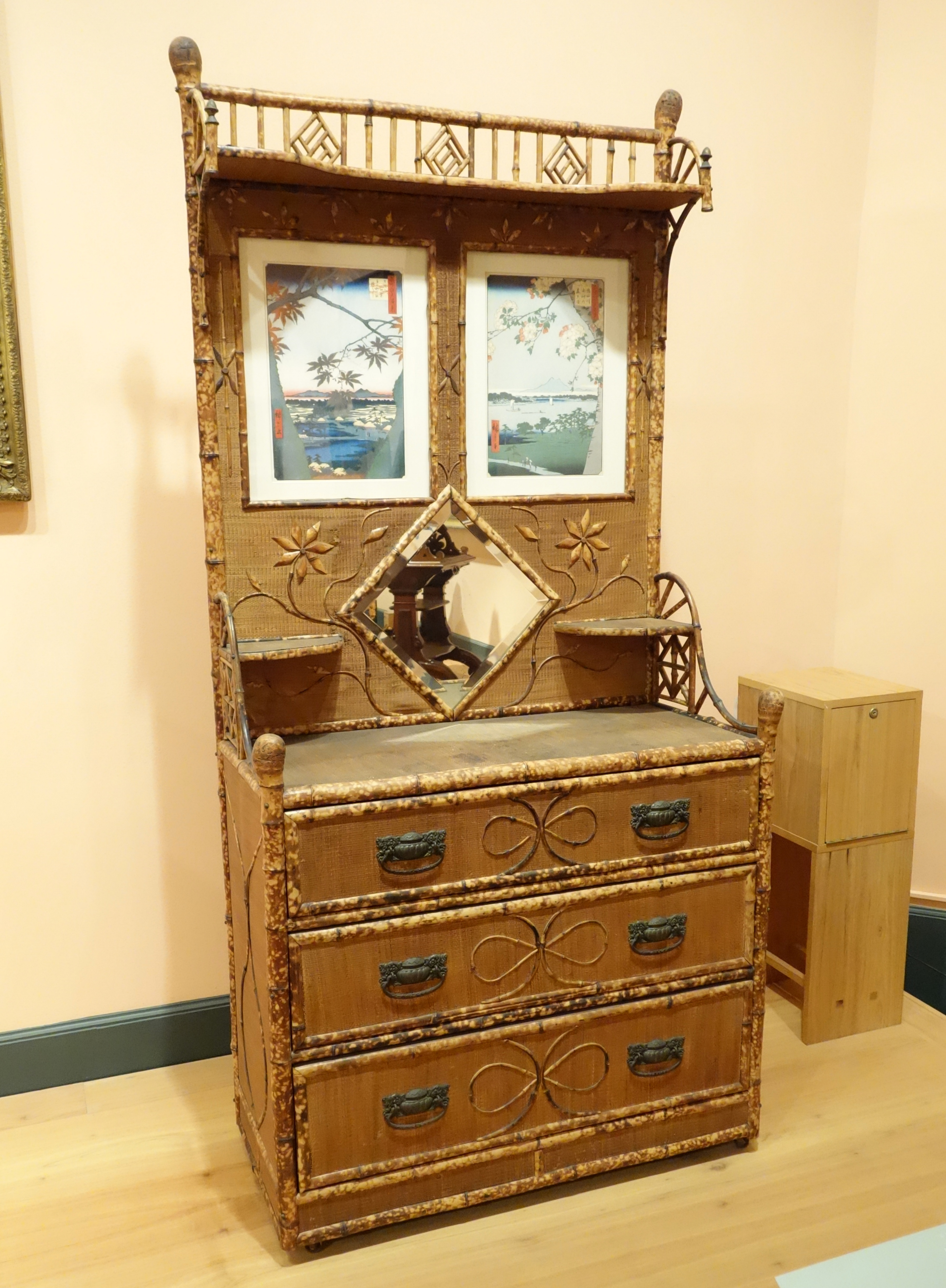
Chest of drawers, woven cane, bamboo, brass and mirror, by Nimura & Sato of Brooklyn, 1905-1915

Nimura & Sato Co. was an American furniture manufacturer best known for its Japanese inspired occasional furniture. It was located at 707 Fulton Street in Downtown Brooklyn, New York. Since Nimura & Sato also imported furniture from Asia, confusion sometimes arises as to whether a piece bearing the Nimura and Sato label was manufactured by the partnership or merely imported and retailed by them.

== Overview ==
In the late 18th and early 19th centuries, Japan was a pre-industrial society that infused every day objects with a sense of good design, and where handiwork and handcrafts were highly valued. While Japanese ceramics became popular in Britain and North America around the middle of the 19th century, it was not until the 1880s and 1890s that American manufactures, such as Nimura & Sato, began to produce significant quantities of Japanese influenced furniture. Such pieces often contained real or simulated (usually turned-maple) bamboo and woven cane in door panels or tabletops. The Japanese furniture contrasted dramatically with the massive, overstuffed, heavy, dark, and often gaudy Victorian furniture that had been in vogue.
