= Bathroom cabinet =

Cabinet in a bathroom

A bathroom cabinet is a cabinet in a bathroom, most often used to store hygiene products, toiletries, and sometimes also medications such that it works as an improvised medicine cabinet. There are two main types of bathroom cabinets: vanity cabinets which are usually placed under sinks and mirror cabinets which are usually placed over sinks or above toilets. Bathroom cabinets often either have an integrated electrical socket or are placed close to one so that appliances such as an electric shaver or hairdryer can be used. Bathroom cabinets have become much more technologically advanced with retailers today offering features like Bluetooth audio, mood lighting, and anti-fog technology.

== Vanity cabinet ==
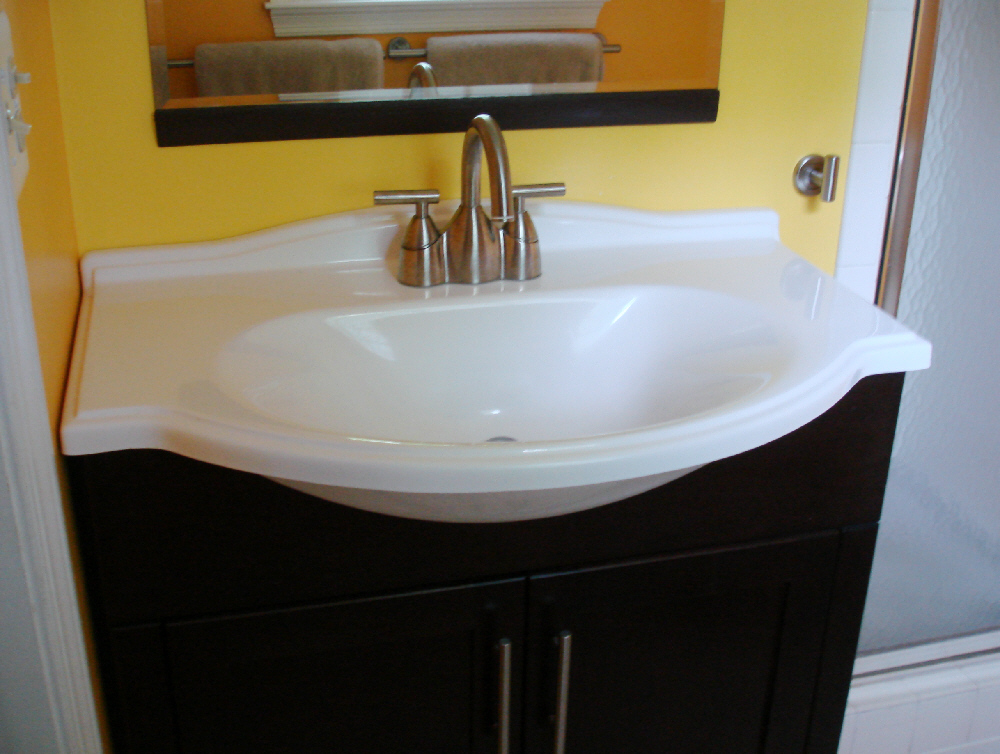
A vanity cabinet

Vanity cabinets are cabinets located under sinks and these are usually used to store larger items such as spare soap bottles or towels.

== Mirror cabinet ==
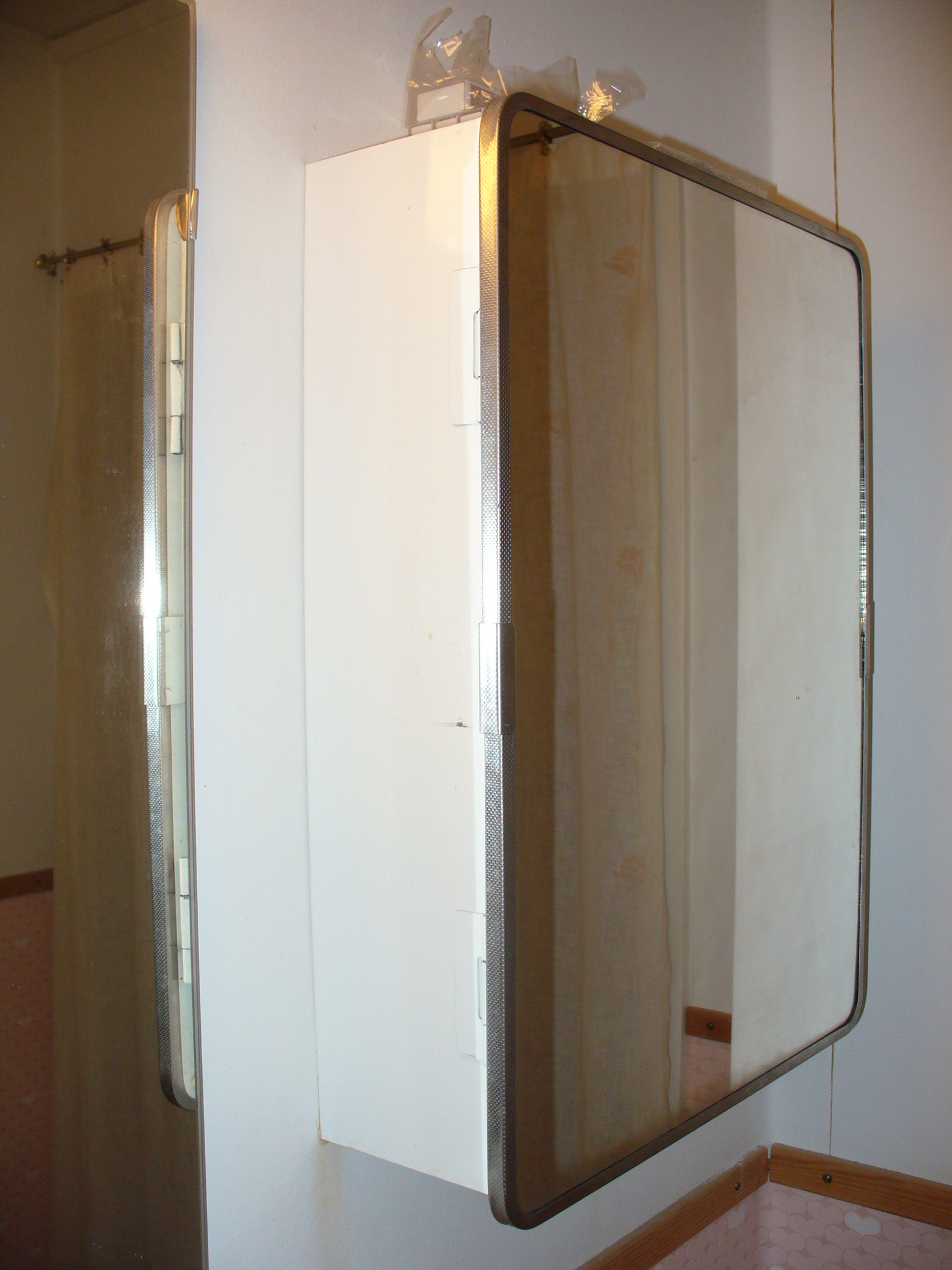
A mirror cabinet

Mirror cabinets are cabinets located over sinks or above toilets and are so named because the cabinet door has a mirror on it. Mirror cabinets are usually used to store smaller items such as spare toothpaste or medicine. Many mirror cabinets are combined with a lamp that illuminates the mirror and thereby (especially in small bathrooms) also the room.

In recent years, many bathroom mirror cabinets have incorporated integrated LED lighting to improve visibility during grooming tasks and to provide additional ambient lighting in bathrooms. These cabinets often include features such as touch sensors, anti-fog demisters, and adjustable color temperature lighting.

== History ==
In the 19th century bathrooms in grand houses were decorated with carpets, wallpaper and upholstered furniture like the other rooms in the house. This changed in the early 20th century with the introduction of non-porous, easily cleaned surfaces to improve sanitation. The bathroom cabinet fitted into this modern view of the bathroom. Modular bathroom systems were introduced from the 1920s, for example from American Standard and Kohler Co., and these would typically include bathroom cabinets as an option. To accommodate medicines, paper products and plastic items, built-in vanities and cabinets were a feature of bathrooms in the second half of the 20th century. From the 1980s considerations of wheelchair-accessibility influenced the design of bathroom cabinets for elderly people.

== See also ==
- List of furniture types
- Toiletry kit
- Shelf (storage)
