= Bathroom =

Room for personal hygiene activities, such as showering

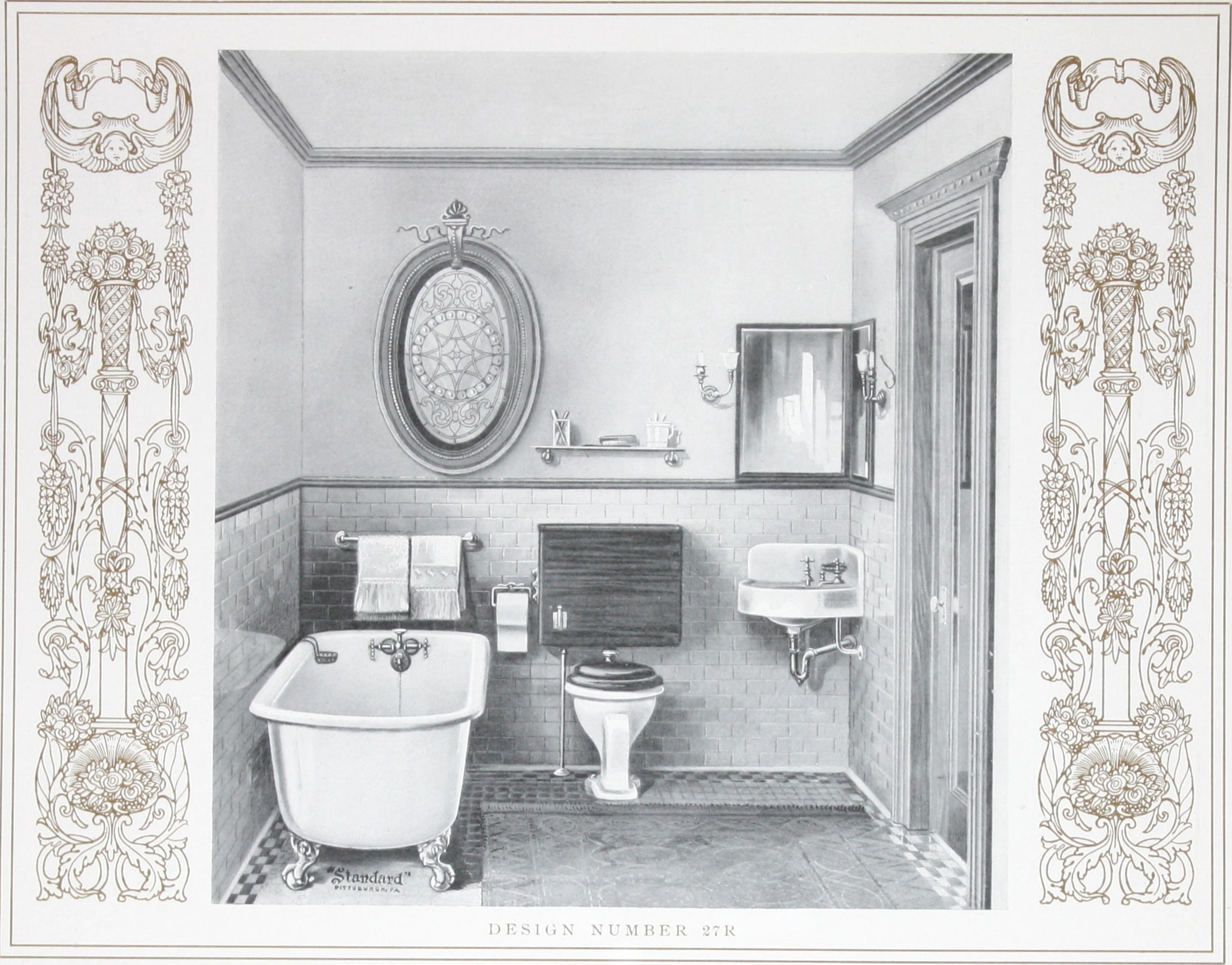
Illustration of a bathroom from the early 20th century, in which appear a bathtub, two towels, a toilet, a sink and two mirrors

A bathroom is a room in which people wash their bodies or parts thereof. It can contain one or more of the following plumbing fixtures: a shower, a bathtub, a bidet, and a sink (also known as a wash basin in the United Kingdom). A toilet is also frequently included. There are also specific toilet rooms, only containing a toilet (often accompanied by a sink). In North American English, these tend to be called "bathrooms" or "half bathrooms", "washrooms", or "powder rooms" as a euphemism. In British English, they are referred to as "the loo", "water closets" or "WC", "toilets", and occasionally "cloakrooms" – and also "lavatories" when they are public.

Historically, bathing was often a collective activity, which took place in public baths. In some countries, the shared social aspect of cleansing the body is still important, for example with sento in Japan and, throughout the Islamic world, the hammam (often known inaccurately in the West as a "Turkish" bath).

== Variations and terminology ==
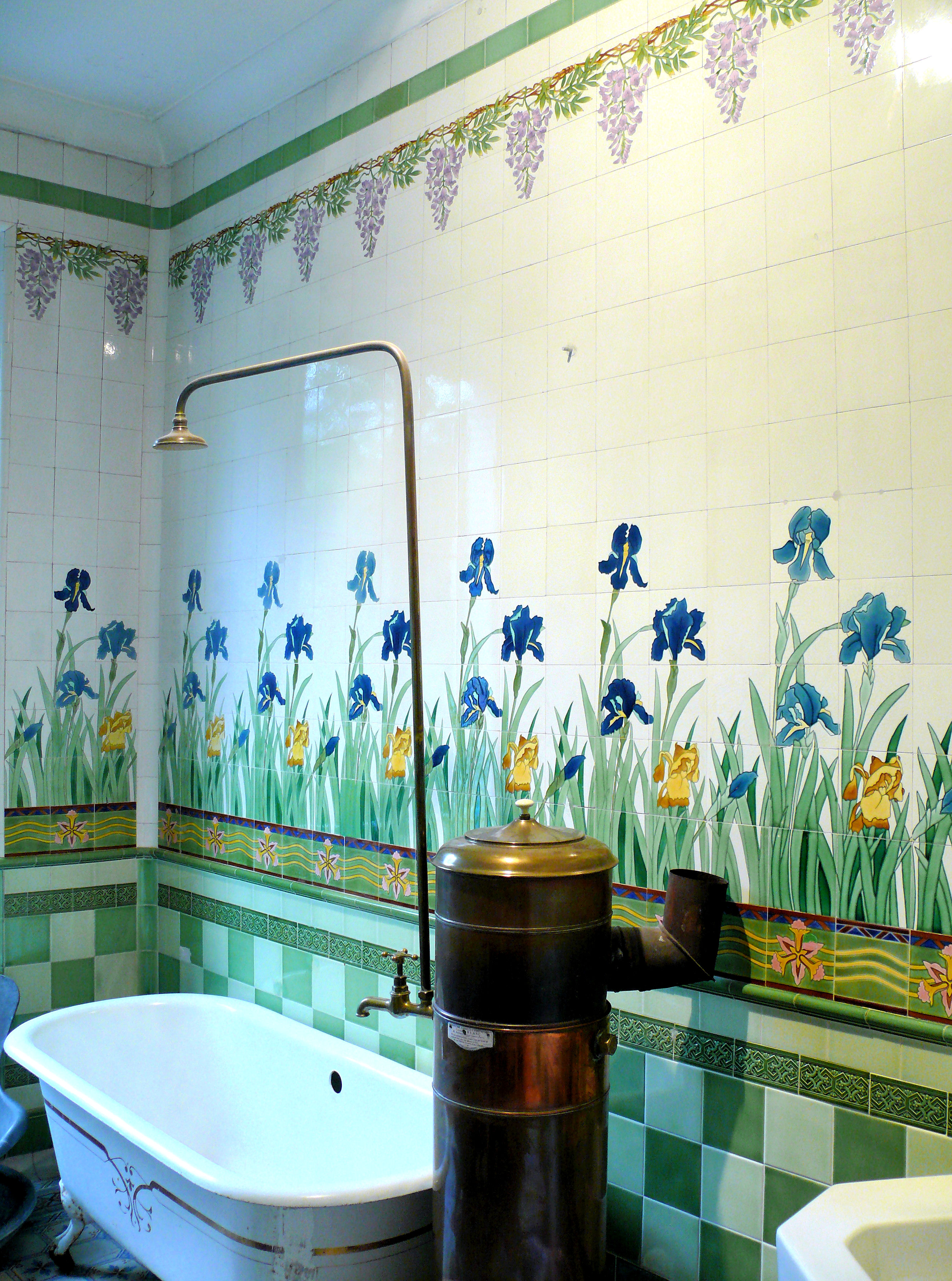
Bathroom in France, with a bathtub and a shower - and no toilet

The term for the place used to clean the body varies around the English-speaking world, as does the design of the room itself. A full bathroom generally contains a bath or shower (or both), a toilet, and a sink (wash basin). An en suite bathroom or en suite shower room is attached to, and only accessible from, a bedroom. A family bathroom, in British estate agent terminology, is a full bathroom not attached to a bedroom, but with its door opening onto a corridor. A Jack and Jill bathroom (or connected bathroom) is situated between and usually shared by the occupants of two separate bedrooms. It may also have two wash basins. A wetroom is a waterproof room usually equipped with a shower; it is designed to eliminate moisture damage and is compatible with underfloor heating systems.

In the U.S., there is a lack of a single definition. This commonly results in discrepancies between the advertised and actual number of baths in real estate listings. Bathrooms are generally categorized as: a "master bathroom", containing a shower and a bathtub, adjoining the largest bedroom; a "full bathroom" (or "full bath"), containing a toilet, a sink, and either a bathtub with a shower or a bathtub and a separate shower stall; "half bath" (or "powder room") containing just a toilet and a sink; or "3/4 bath" containing a toilet, a sink, and a shower. However, usage varies; in some U.S. markets, a toilet, sink, and shower are considered a "full bath", and outside real estate the term "bathroom" is commonly used for a room containing a toilet and a wash basin, and nothing else.

In Canada, "bathroom" is the common term for such a room in private homes, while "washroom" is the preferred term for public facilities.

== Design considerations ==
=== Towels ===
Bathrooms often have one or more towel bars or rings for hanging towels.

=== Furniture ===
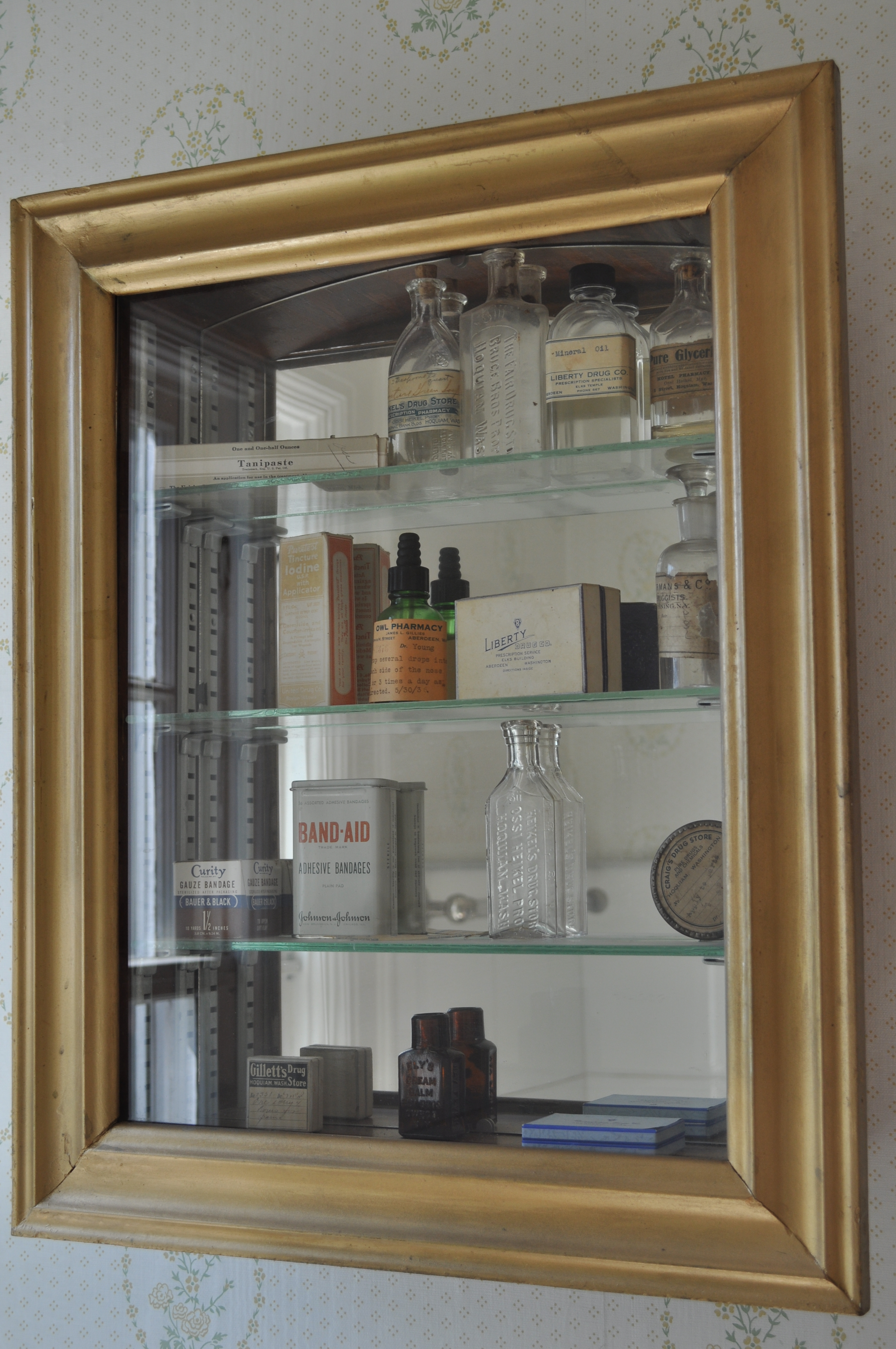
A bathroom cabinet

Some bathrooms contain a bathroom cabinet for personal hygiene products and medicines, and drawers or shelves (sometimes in column form) for storing towels and other items.

=== Bidet ===
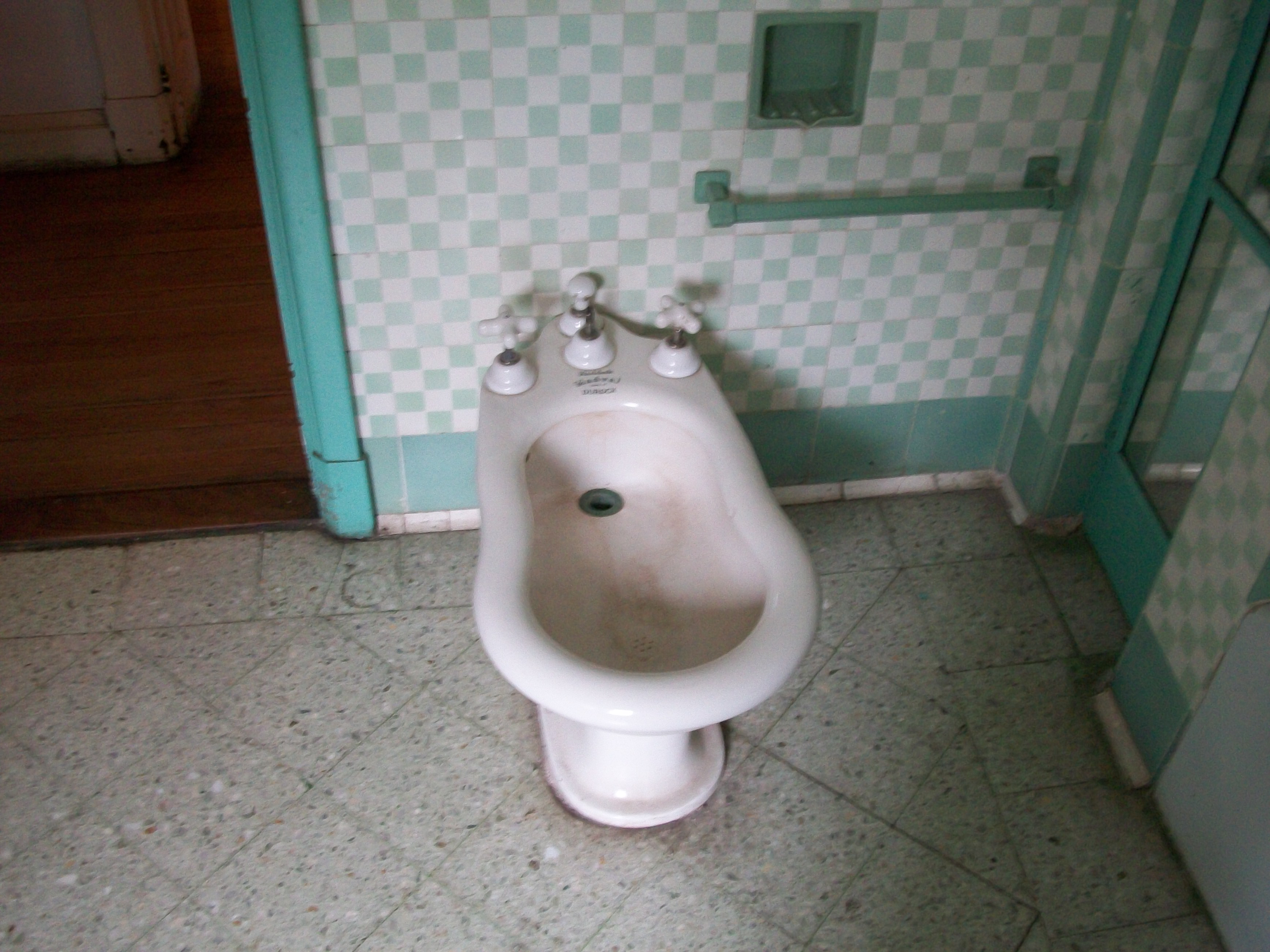
A modern bidet of the traditional type

Some bathrooms contain a bidet, which might be placed next to a toilet.

=== Plumbing ===
The bathroom design must account for the use of hot and cold water, in significant quantities, for cleaning the body. The water is also used for moving solid and liquid human waste to a sewer or septic tank. Water may be splashed on the walls and floor, and hot humid air may cause condensation on cold surfaces. From a decorating point of view, the bathroom presents a challenge. Ceiling, wall, and floor materials and coverings should be impervious to water and readily and easily cleaned. The use of ceramic or glass, as well as smooth plastic materials, is common in bathrooms for their ease of cleaning. Such surfaces are often cold to the touch, however, so water-resistant bath mats or even bathroom carpets may be used on the floor to make the room more comfortable. Alternatively, the floor may be heated, possibly by strategically placing resistive electric mats under the floor tile or radiant hot water tubing close to the underside of the floor surface.

=== Electricity ===
Electrical appliances, such as lights, heaters, and heated towel rails, generally need to be installed as fixtures, with permanent connections rather than plugs and sockets. This minimizes the risk of electric shock. Ground-fault circuit interrupter electrical sockets can reduce the risk of electric shock, and are required for bathroom socket installation by electrical and building codes in the United States and Canada. In some countries, such as the United Kingdom, only special sockets suitable for electric shavers and electric toothbrushes are permitted in bathrooms and are labelled as such.

UK building regulations also define what type of electrical fixtures, such as light fittings (i.e. how water-/splash-proof) may be installed in the areas (zones) around and above baths, and showers.

=== Lighting ===
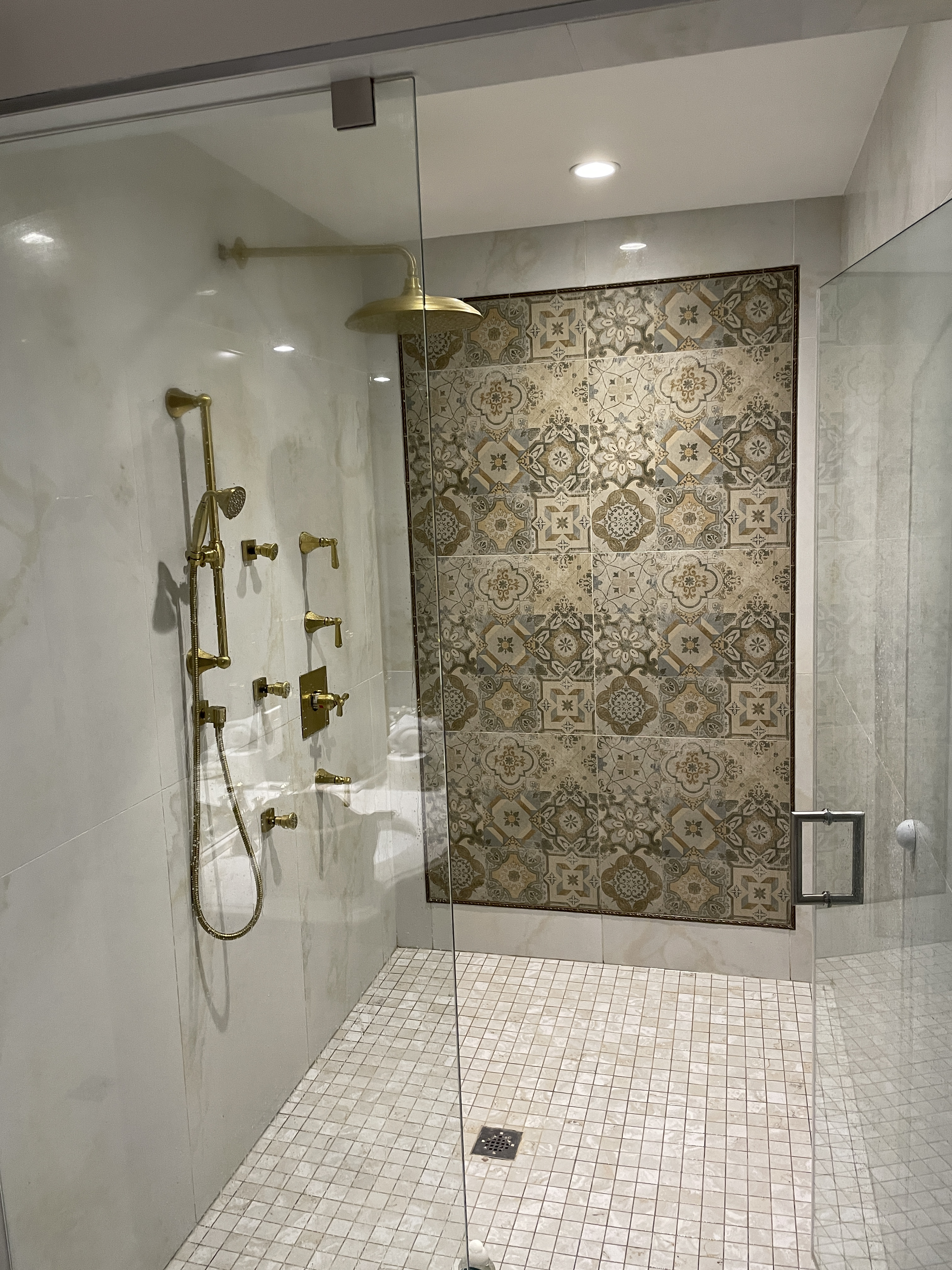

Bathroom lighting should be uniform, and bright and must minimize glare. For all the activities like shaving, showering, grooming, etc. one must ensure equitable lighting across the entire bathroom space. The mirror area should have at least two sources of light at least 1 foot apart to eliminate any shadows on the face. Skin tones and hair color are highlighted with a tinge of yellow light. Ceiling and wall lights must be safe for use in a bathroom (electrical parts need to be splashproof) and therefore must carry appropriate certification such as IP44.

All forms of bathroom lighting should be IP44 rated as safe to use in the bathroom.

== History ==
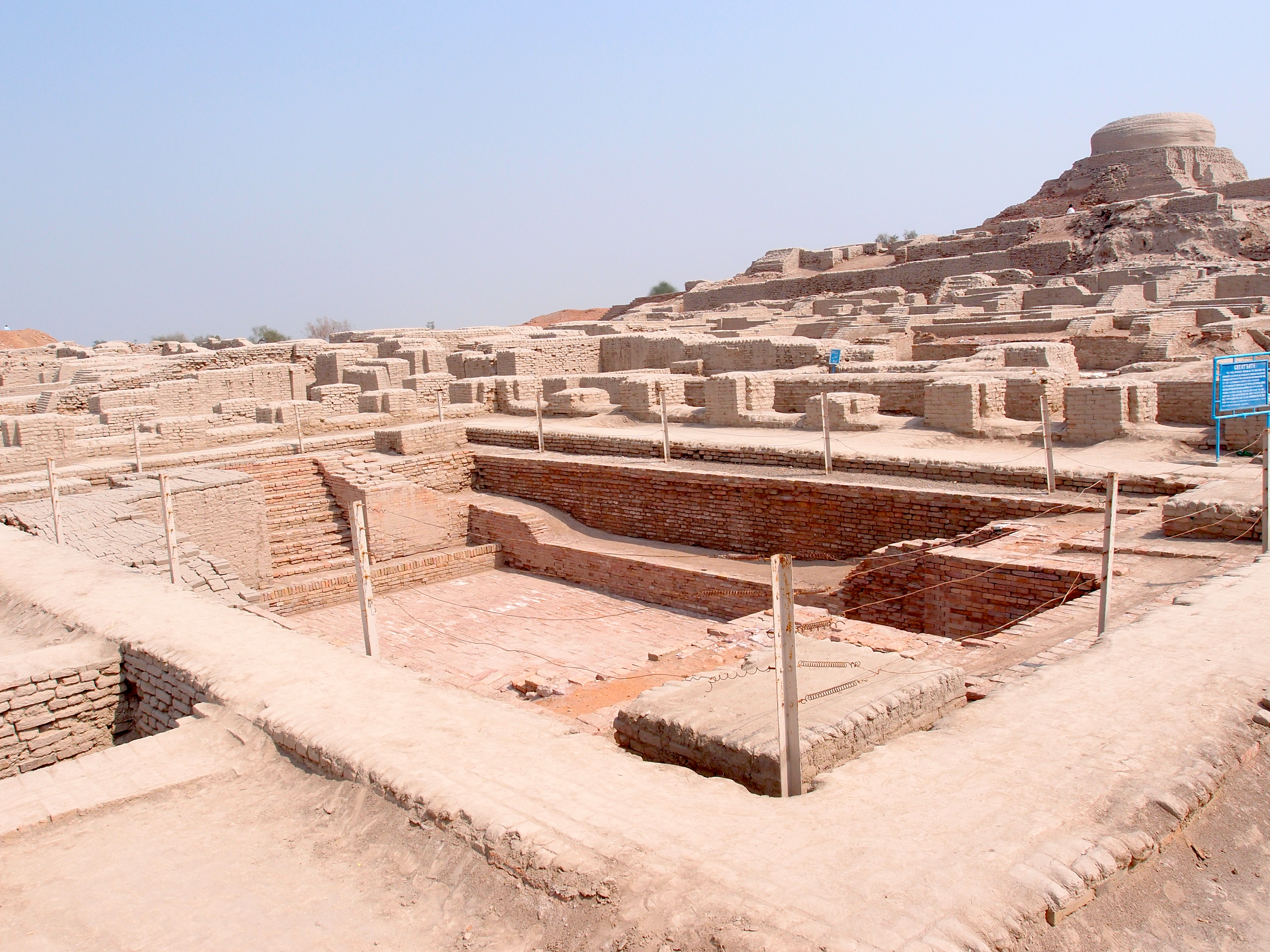
The Great Bath of Mohenjo-daro

The first records for the use of baths date back as far as 3000 B.C. At this time water had a strong religious value, being seen as a purifying element for both body and soul. So it was not uncommon for people to be required to cleanse themselves before entering a sacred area. Baths are recorded as part of village or town life throughout this period, with a split between steam baths in Europe and America and cold baths in Asia. Communal baths were erected in a distinctly separate area from the living quarters of the village.

The c. 2400 BCE, Pyramid of Sahure, and adjoining temple complex at Abusir, was discovered to have a network of copper drainage pipes.

=== Greek and Roman bathing ===
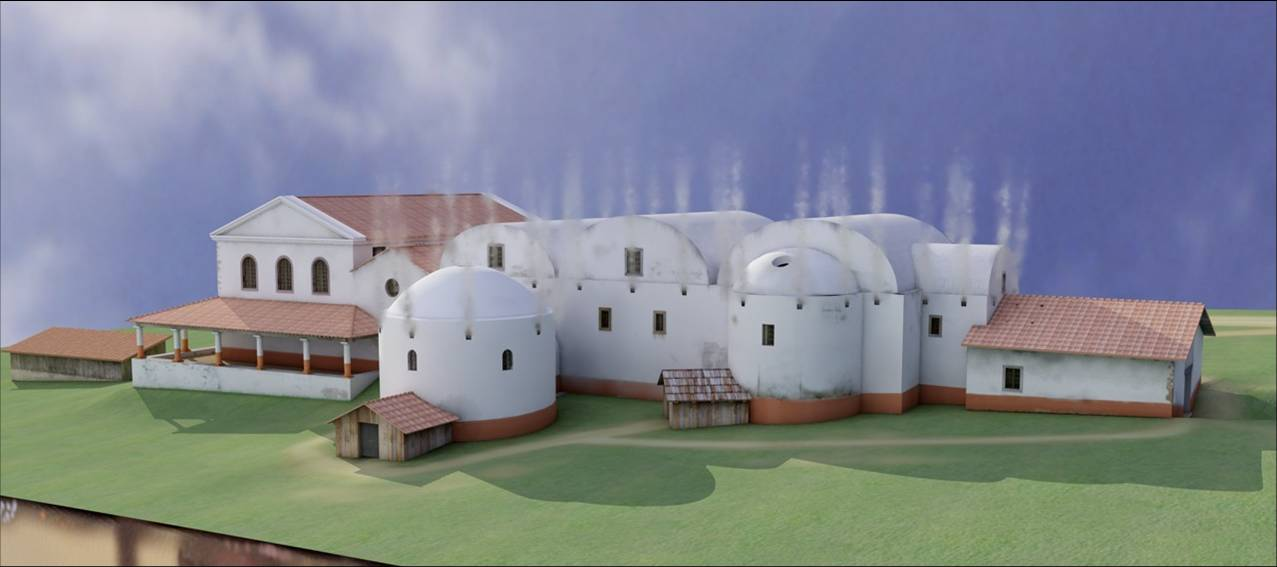
Virtual reconstruction of the Roman Baths in Weißenburg, Germany, using data from laser scan technology

The Roman attitudes towards bathing are well documented; they built large thermal baths (thermae), marking not only a significant social development but also providing a public source of relaxation and rejuvenation. Here was a place where people could meet to discuss the matters of the day and enjoy entertainment. During this period there was a distinction between private and public baths, with many wealthy families having their thermal baths in their houses. Despite this they still made use of the public baths, showing the value that they had as a public institution. The strength of the Roman Empire was telling in this respect; imports from throughout the world allowed Roman citizens to enjoy ointments, incense, combs, and mirrors. The partially reconstructed ruins can still be seen today, for example at Roman Baths (Bath) in Bath, England, then part of Roman Britain.

Not all ancient baths were in the style of the large pools that often come to mind when one imagines the Roman baths; the earliest surviving bathtub dates back to 1700 B.C and hails from the Palace of Knossos in Crete. What is remarkable about this tub is not only the similarity with the baths of today but also how the plumbing works surrounding it differ so little from modern models. A more advanced prehistoric (15th century BC and before) system of baths and plumbing is to be found in the excavated town of Akrotiri, on the Aegean island of Santorini (Thera). There, alabaster tubs and other bath fittings were found, along with a sophisticated twin plumbing system to transport hot and cold water separately. This was probably because of easy access to geothermic hot springs on this volcanic island.

Both the Greeks and the Romans recognized the value of bathing as an important part of their lifestyles. Writers such as Homer had their heroes bathe in warm water to regain their strength; it is perhaps notable that the mother of Achilles bathed him to gain his invincibility. Palaces have been uncovered throughout Greece with areas that are dedicated to bathing, spaces with ceramic bathtubs, as well as sophisticated drainage systems. Homer uses the word λοετρά, loetrá, "baths", later λουτρά, loutrá, from the verb λούειν, loúein, to bathe. The same root finds an even earlier attestation on Linear B tablets, in the name of the River Lousios ("bathing" [river]), in Arcadia. Public baths are mentioned by the comedian Aristophanes as βαλανεία, balaneía (sing.: βαλανείον, balaneíon, Latinized as balneum, a "balneary").

=== 16th century and beyond ===
Throughout the 16th, 17th, and 18th centuries, the use of public baths declined gradually in the West, and private spaces were favored, thus laying the foundations for the bathroom, as it was to become, in the 20th century. However, increased urbanization led to the creation of more baths and washhouses in Britain.

In Japan shared bathing in sento and onsen (spas) still exists, the latter being very popular.

Cultural historian Barbara Penner has written of the ambiguous nature of bathrooms as both the most private space and one most connected to the wider outside world.

== Gallery ==
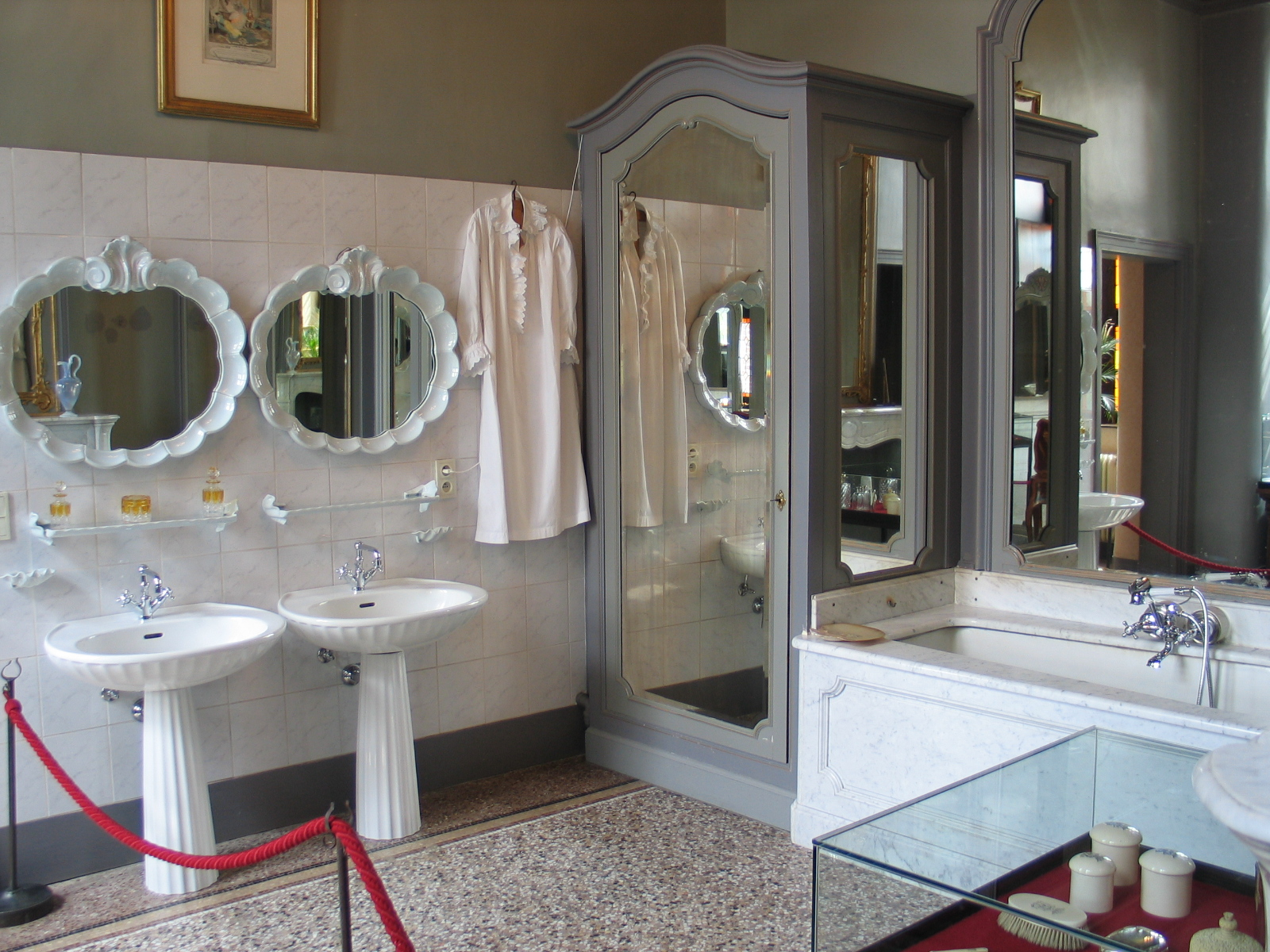
Bathroom in Belgium

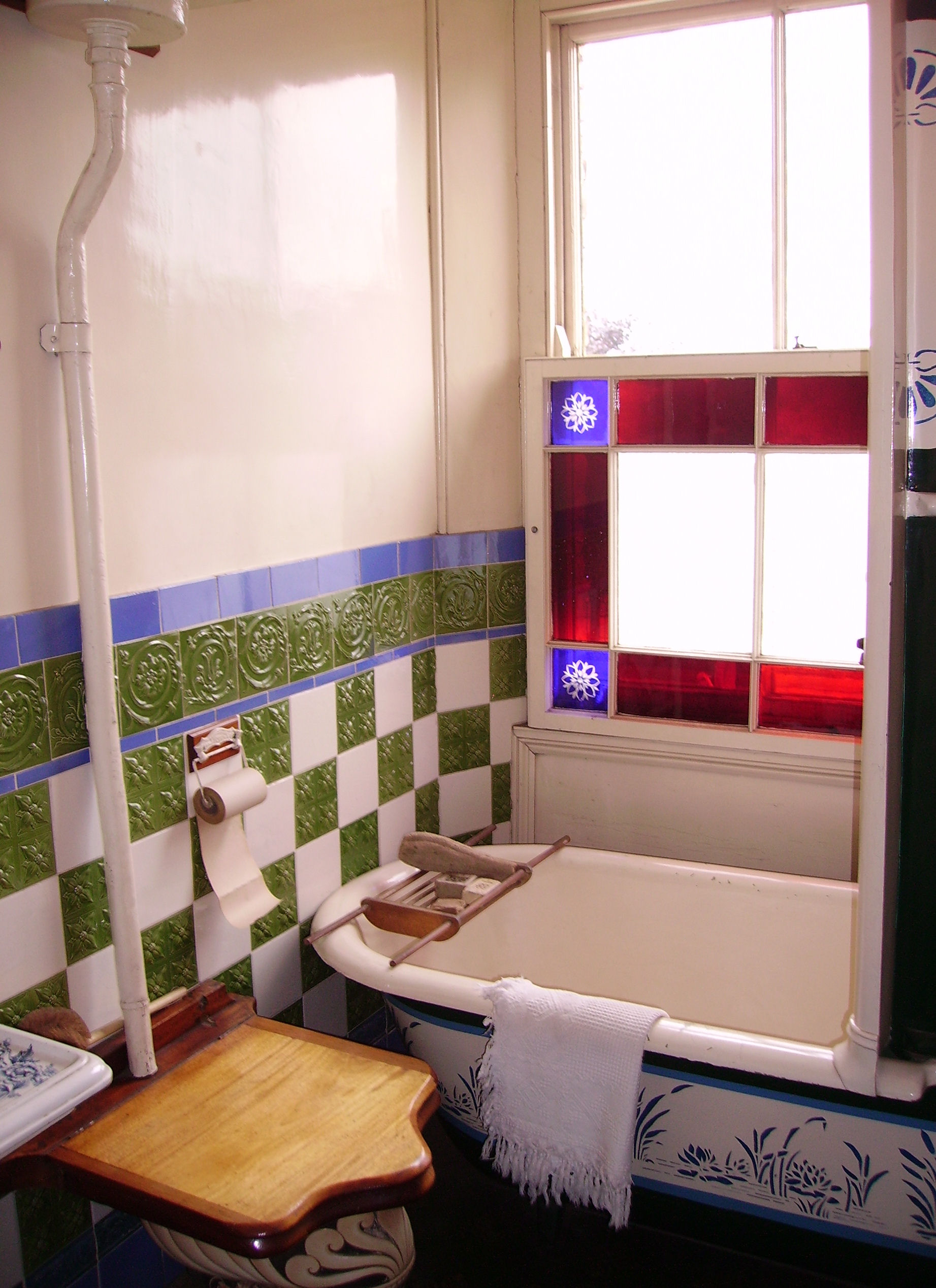
An early 20th century bathroom in the Beamish Museum, near Durham, England

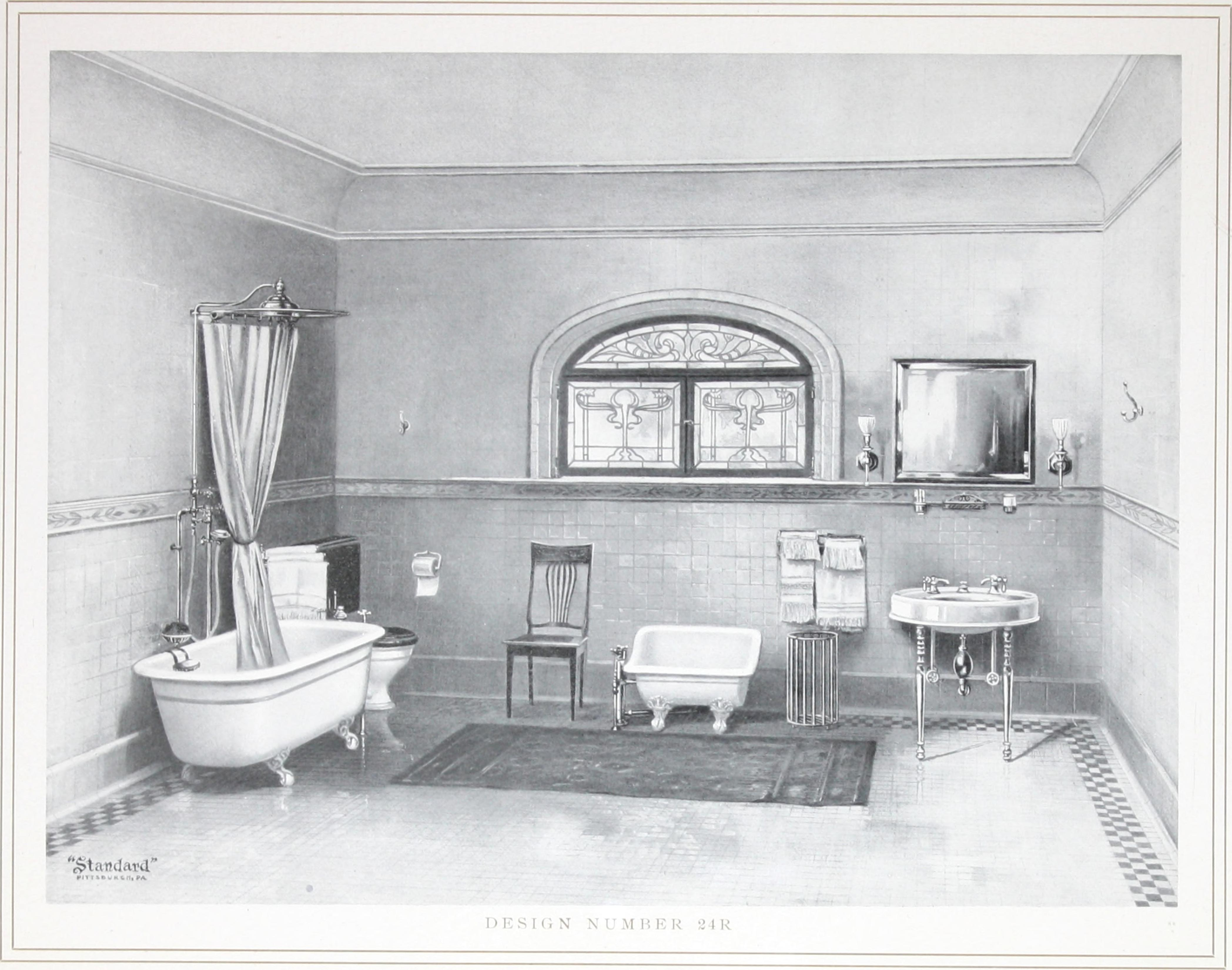
Illustration of a bathroom from 1903

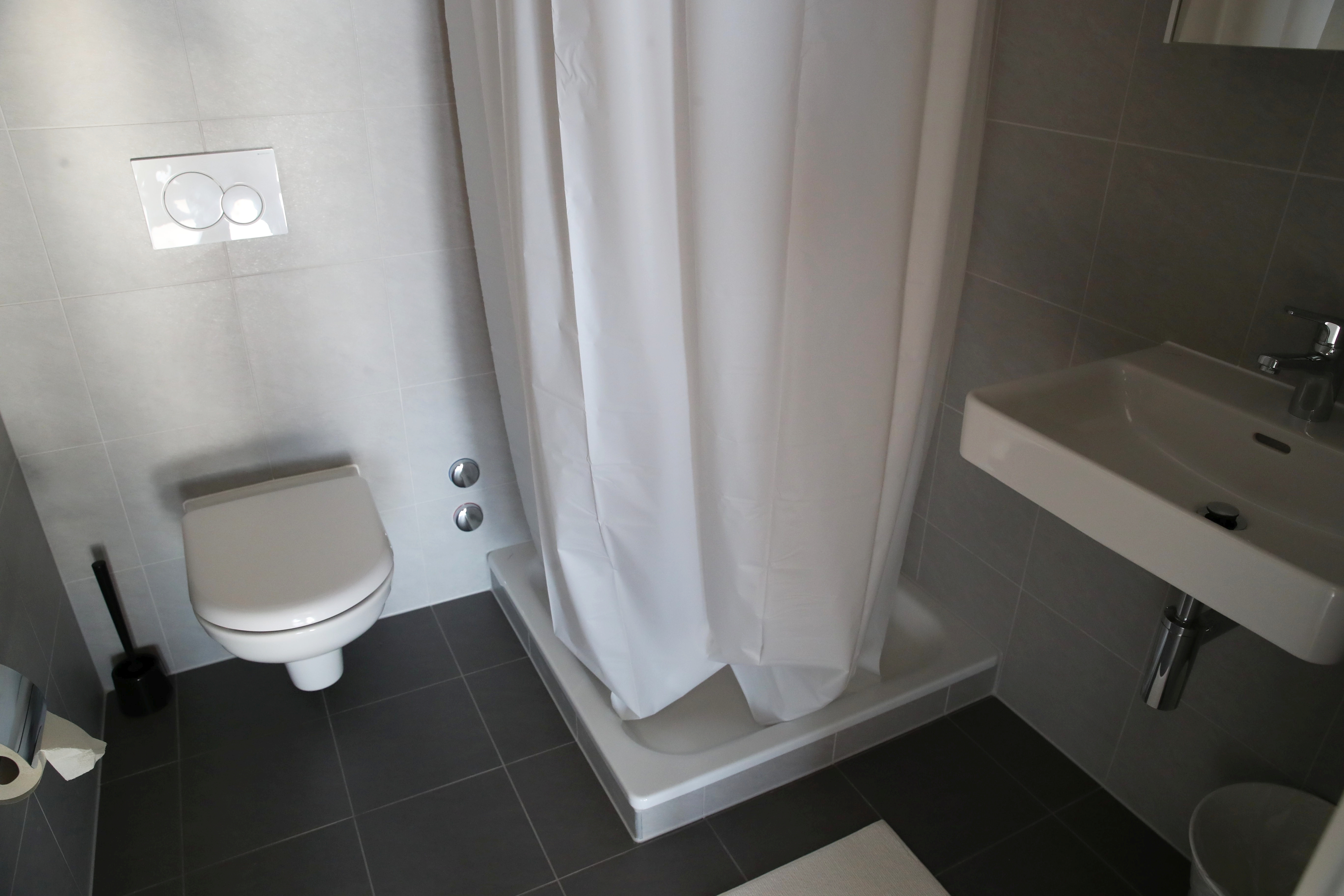
A bathroom in the Olympic village of the 2020 Winter Youth Olympics

== See also ==
- Accessible toilet
- Folding screen
- Furo - Japanese bathroom
- Washstand
