= Baker's rack =

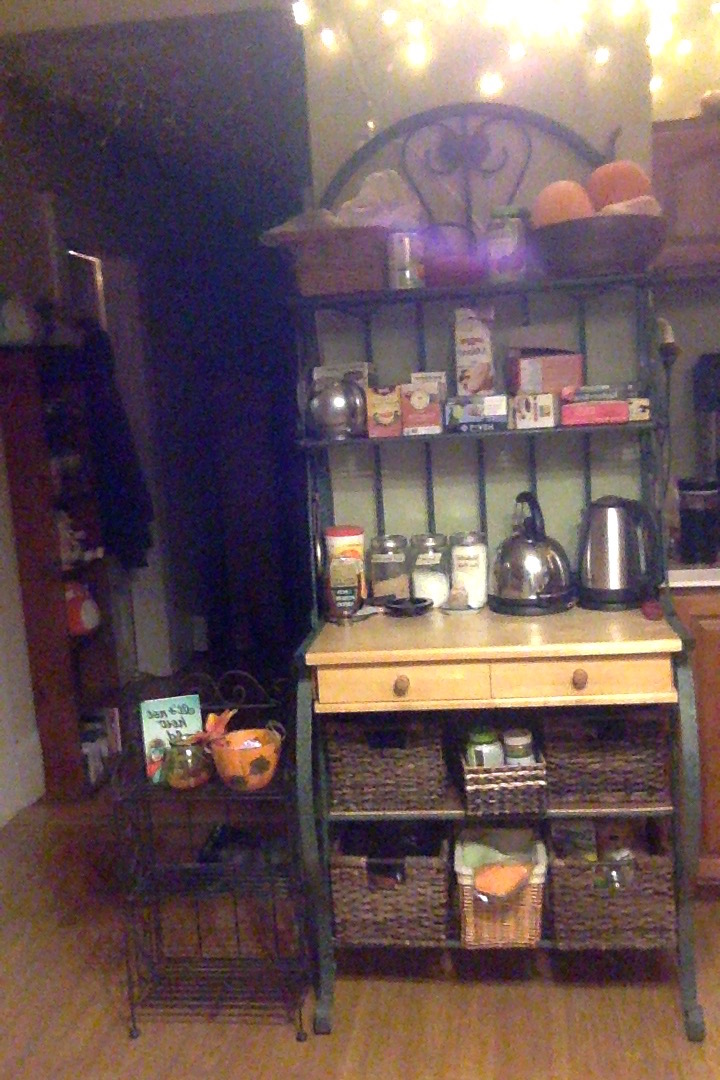
Both can be considered baker's racks despite very different designs

A baker's rack is a type of furniture with shelves, typically made of wrought iron or some other metal. "Since the 17th century, baker's racks have been part of many homes around the world. This versatile storage furniture has gained its name because it has been originally used by bakers." The shelves are made of a conductive material, often steel or iron, which served to help cool a baker's goods such as hot pies, breads, and pastries. The conductivity and thermal mass of metal not only allows for heat to be quickly transferred from the pan to the shelf, but held for a long time. This allowed the cooling process to be equally distributed so baked goods maintained their integrity.

"After cooling, bakers use the racks to let their neighbors preview the goods before selling. They use these racks to roll dough and store containers of flour, sugar, and other baking needs. Today, many bakers still use these racks for the same purposes, only with the addition of other baking materials such as modern day baking equipment, cookbooks, and ready-mix goods."

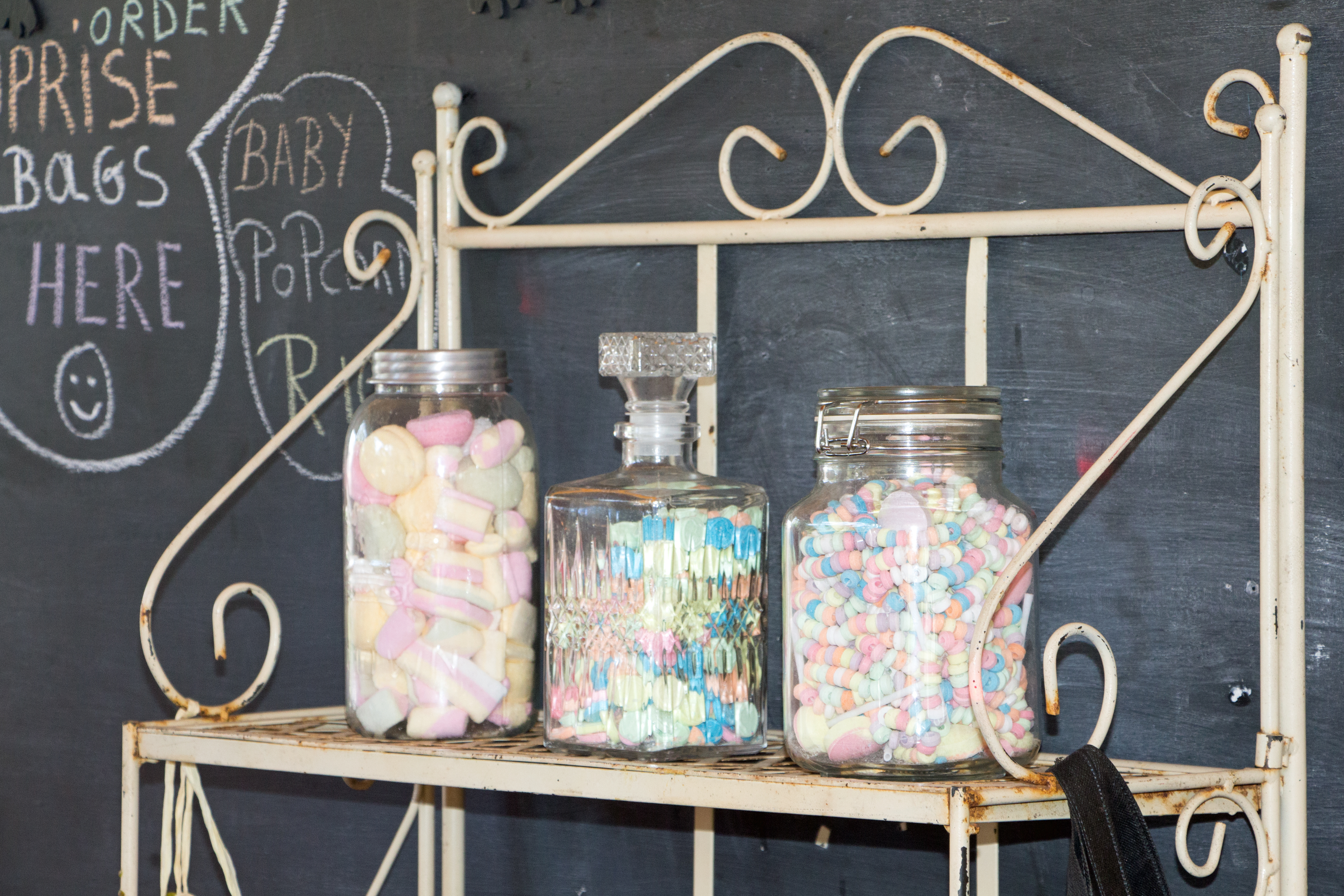
Root44 62

Non-bakers have been using baker's racks for storage, kitchen use, houseplants, and decor. Some people use it to store non-baked food products such as fruits, canned goods, coffee, or liquor while others use it to display books, game boards, or picture frames. As the baker's racks have been used for different functions, their structure has also changed. From having simple shelves, some baker's racks today now have cabinets, drawers, and other storage functions. In addition, baker's racks have now been more decorative and serve as accent pieces in the home. This is why their designs have also evolved. Modern incarnations have adapted to not just incorporate shelving but counters for working and/or wine bottle storage.

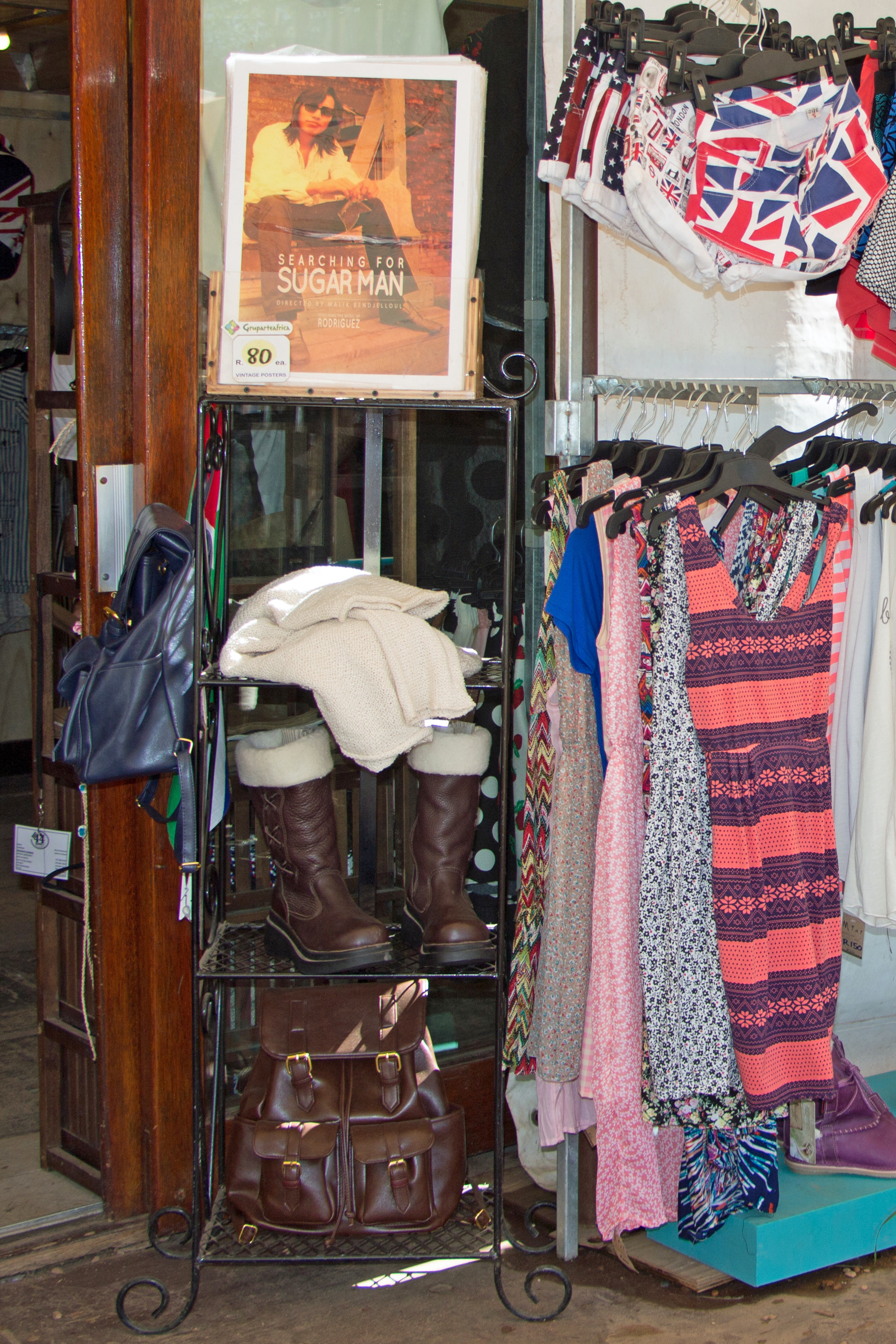
Wrought iron baker's rack used to display items for sale
