= Wine table =

A Wine-table is a late 15th-century device for facilitating after-dinner drinking, the cabinetmakers called it a "Gentleman's Social Table." It was always narrow and of semicircular or horseshoe form, and the guests sat round the outer circumference. In the earlier and simpler shapes, metal wells for bottles and ice were sunk into the surface of the table; they were fitted with brass lids.

In later and more elaborate examples, the tables were fitted with a revolving wine carriage, bottle holder, or tray working upon a balanced arm enabling the bottles to be passed to any guest without shaking. The side opposite the guests was often fitted with a network bag. It has been conjectured that this bag was intended to hold biscuits, but it is much more likely that its function was to prevent glasses and bottles which might be upset from falling to the floor. The wine table might be drawn up to the fire in cold weather without inconvenience from the heat. It was fitted with curtains hung upon a brass frame and running upon rings. Sometimes the table was accompanied by a circular bottle stand supported on a tripod into which the bottles were deeply sunk to preserve them from the heat of the fire. Yet another form was circular, with a socket in the center for the bottle. Wine tables followed the fashion of other tables and were often inlaid with wood or brass. They are now exceedingly scarce.

== See also ==
- Wine accessory
- Wine tasting
