= Barbara Penner =

British historian and educator (born 1970)

Barbara Penner (born 1970) is an architectural historian and Professor of Architectural Humanities at the Bartlett School of Architecture, University College London. She is a specialist in the history of small spaces, specifically the bathroom and toilet, and has written on the institution of the honeymoon in 19th century North America.

Penner received her BA in English literature and history of art from McGill University in 1994, her Master of Science in architectural history from University College London in 1996, and her PhD from Birkbeck College in 2003.

Barbara has received a variety of fellowships and awards, including from The Leverhulme Trust, The Clark Art Institute, Cornell University, the Winterthur Museum and the Gilder-Lehrman Institute for American History. She has recently concluded a major Humanities in the European Research Area Joint Research Programme grant, Printing the Past: Architecture, Print Culture, and Uses of the Past in Modern Europe, led by the Oslo School of Architecture and Design, with partners from digital media lab Factum Arte, Ghent University, Leiden University, Musée d’Orsay, and the Victoria & Albert Museum.

== Selected publications ==
- Gender space architecture: An interdisciplinary introduction. Routledge, London, 1999. (Edited with Iain Borden and Jane Rendell) ISBN 978-0415172530
- Ladies and gents: Public toilets and gender. Temple University Press, 2009. (Edited with Olga Gershenson) ISBN 978-1592139392
- Newlyweds on tour: Honeymooning in nineteenth-century America. University Press of New England, Lebanon, 2009. ISBN 9781584657736
- Bathroom. Reaktion Books, 2013. ISBN 9781780231938 (RIBA President's Award for Outstanding University-Located Research, 2014)
