= Bombay furniture =

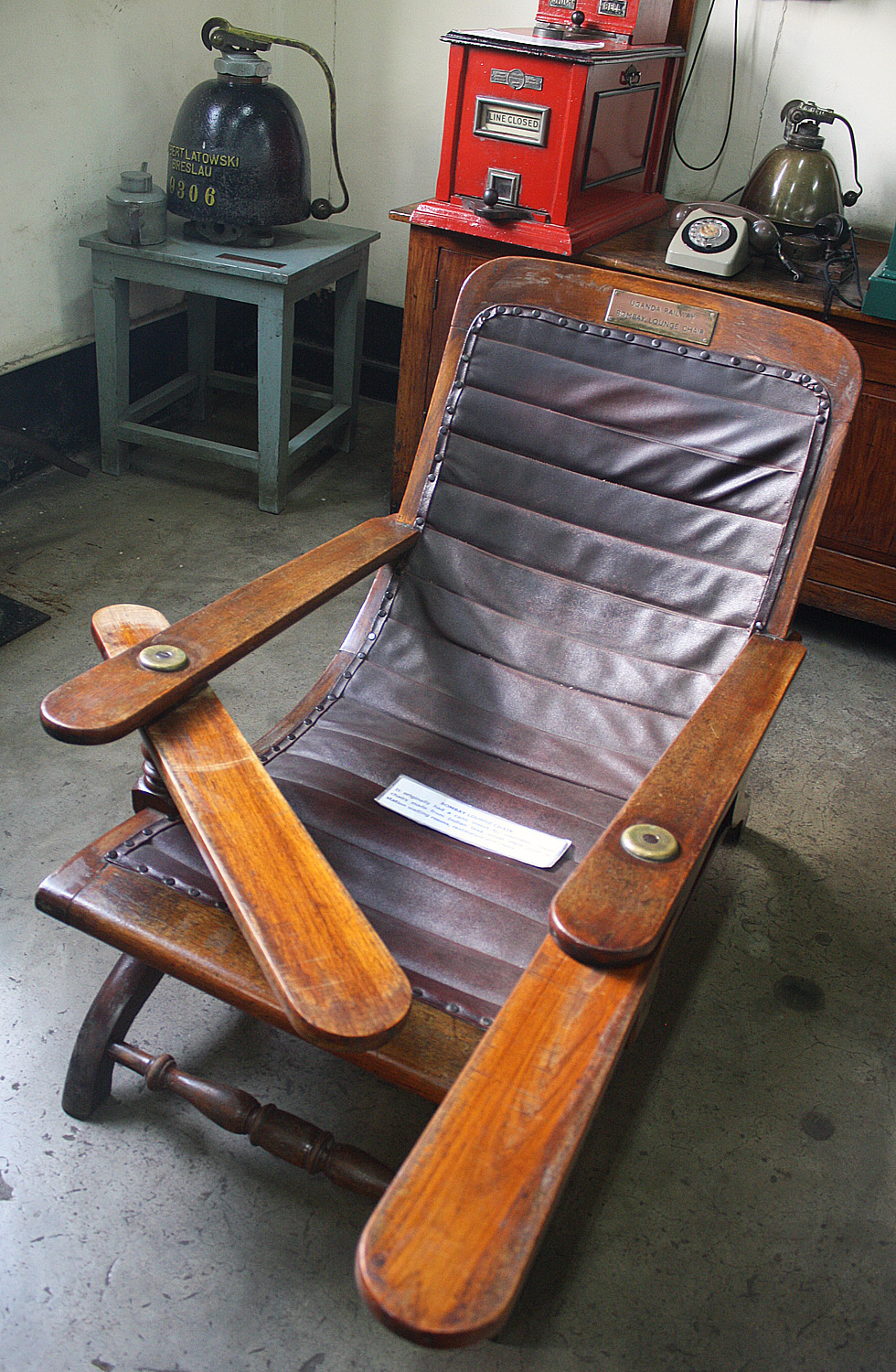
A Bombay lounge chair in Nairobi.

The term "Bombay" or "blackwood" applies to a rather extensive class of furniture pieces originally manufactured in the city of Bombay (now Mumbai) and in the towns of Surat and Ahmedabad in India.

Bombay furniture has influences from England, France, and Holland. In 1850 there were six main furniture shops in Bombay, with five to ten workmen in each shop.

The wood used is Shisham or blackwood (Dalbergia), a hard-grained dark-colored timber which with proper treatment assumes a beautiful natural polish. The blackwood was often brought from Cochin or further down the Malabar coast. Much of the so-called Bombay furniture is clumsy and inelegant in form, defects which it is suggested by experts, like Sir George Birdwood, it owes to the circumstance that the original models were Dutch. In some cases, intricate Indian carvings were applied to European shapes of furniture. Some of the smaller articles, such as flower stands, small tables, and ornamental stands, are, however, of exceedingly graceful contour, and good examples are highly prized by collectors. The carving at its best is lace-like in character, and apart from its inherent beauty is attractive on account of the ingenuity shown by the worker in adapting his design in detail to the purpose of the article he is fashioning.

The workmen who manufacture the most artistic Bombay furniture are a special class with inherited traditions. Shopkeepers were often Parsi while the workers commonly came from Gujarat and Kutch. Often a man knows only one design, which has been transmitted to him by his father, who in his turn had had it from his father before him. In the early 1900s under European auspices efforts were made with a certain measure of success to modernize the industry by introducing portions of the native work into furniture of Western design. In the main, however, the conventional patterns were still adhered to. Bombay boxes are inlaid in geometrical patterns on wood. The inlaying materials consist of the wire, sandal wood, sappanwood, ebony, ivory and stags' horns, and the effect produced by the combination of minute pieces of these various substances is altogether peculiar and distinctive. The pattern is first drawn on paper and subsequently on the wood. Furniture makers used the adze, chisel and drill.
