= Concrete furniture =

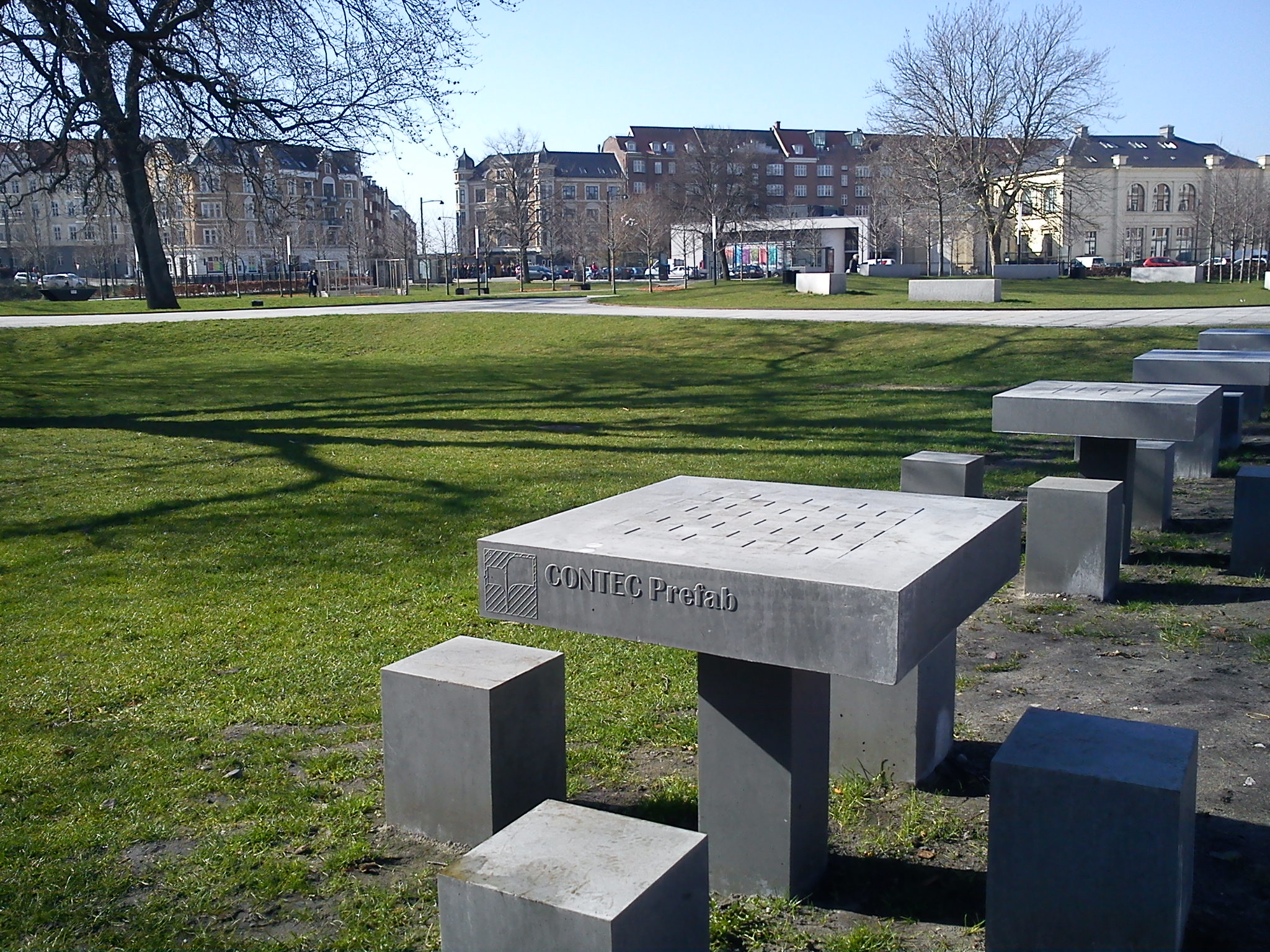
Mølleparken

The versatility of concrete has led to its appearance in numerous non-traditional formats such as furniture, sculpture and art.

Due to improved setting and molding techniques, it is now possible to create more sophisticated shaped furniture using concrete. The added durability of concrete means they can be placed indoors or outdoors, leading to many being located in local parks and community areas.

Concrete furniture design is evolving rapidly and cement furniture is making an appearance inside the contemporary home, such as cast concrete kitchen counters.

== History ==
Recent discoveries show that concrete has been used in Mesopotamia and Ancient Rome over 4,000 years ago. However, the application of concrete in interior design and furniture started much later, in the beginning of the 20th century. Thomas Edison is known as a pioneer of concrete development, and the first person to predict the use of concrete furniture. His company Edison Portland Cement Company combined ore milling technologies to develop more durable cement for construction of concrete houses and large building blocks. Edison created concrete phonograph cabinets and proposed the making of concrete musical instruments, refrigerators, and furniture.

== Interior concrete furniture ==
Most use cases of concrete are for exterior purposes however there are many companies that also provide interior furniture as well. The largest disadvantage of adding concrete inside of a property is the weight of the furniture piece. The advantages are amazing durability and unmatchable aesthetics. Interior pieces are generally created by building a form in the shape and design that you're looking for. The potential style, size, and design of the concrete piece are limited to individuals that create and design the mold. Many people love incorporating concrete in their bathrooms with concrete top vanities that have integrated sinks. There are also beautifully designed kitchens that have large concrete islands or dining tables.

== Example designers ==
Some example designers who create concrete furniture are Nico Yektai, Peter Harrison, Joël Urruty and Douglas Thayer.
