= Toiletry bag =

Portable container that holds hygiene and toiletry supplies

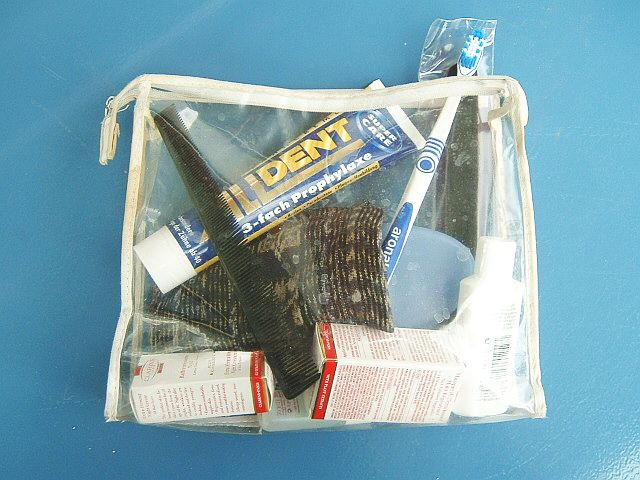
A clear plastic toiletry bag

A toiletry bag (also called a toiletry kit, dopp kit, bathroom bag, ditty bag, sponge bag, toilet bag, personal hygiene kit, amenity kit, travel kit, washkit, or soapbag) is a portable container—usually a pouch with a drawstring or zippered closure—that holds body hygiene and toiletry supplies such as toothbrush and toothpaste, dental floss, cotton swabs, deodorant, nail clippers, tweezers, soap, shaving supplies, hairbrush, contact lenses and feminine products. Toiletry bags are most often used for traveling and in living circumstances where permanent shelves and cupboards are unavailable for use.

Toiletry bags vary widely in size, but most are designed to be stored within a primary bag such as a backpack or suitcase. Designs range from simple plastic pouches to high-quality leather kits to roll-up bags that fold out for easy access. Toiletry bags are usually purchased separately from the supplies, which are added by the consumer; however, many companies from e-commerce websites to convenience stores also sell simple pre-packed toiletry kits.

== Terminology ==
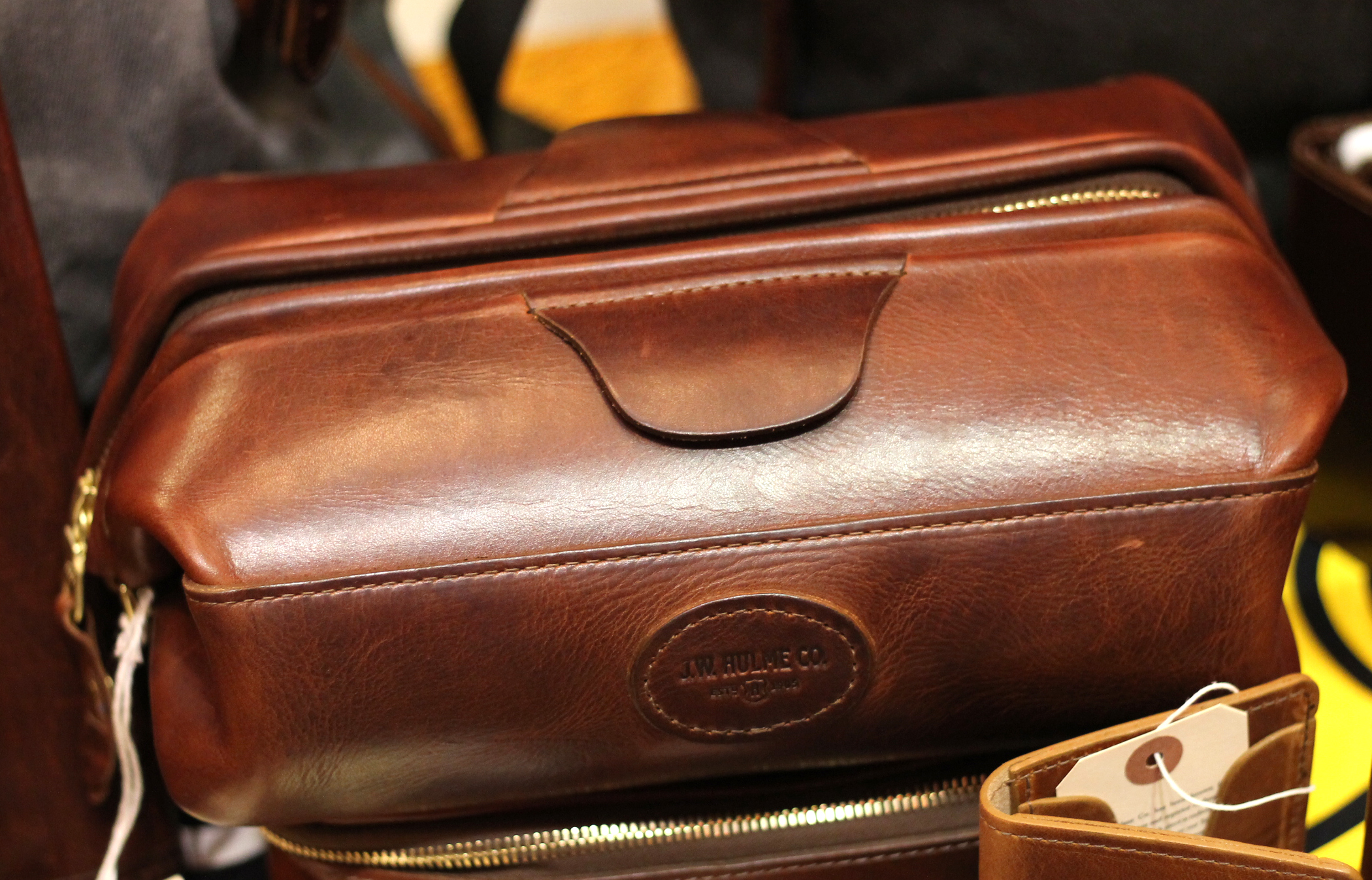
Leather dopp kit

Dopp kit is a term that originated in the early 20th century, originally referring to toiletry kits for men and World War II soldiers before later becoming a common term for toiletry kits, particularly ones made with leather or other high-quality materials. The word was coined by German leatherworker Charles Doppelt, who patented the idea of "Dopps" in 1919 and marketed them locally before landing a contract with the US Army during WWII. Dopp kits were once a common gift given to young men as they ascended from boyhood to adulthood. Doppelt's company was purchased by Samsonite in the early 1970s, and later acquired by Buxton in 1979. The trademark was cancelled in 2003, and then reacquired in 2017, with the U.S. Patent and Trademark Office listing Buxton as the current owner. The term is now generic.

Ditty bag originated as a term around 1860, referring to a bag used by sailors to hold small articles.
