= Occasional furniture =

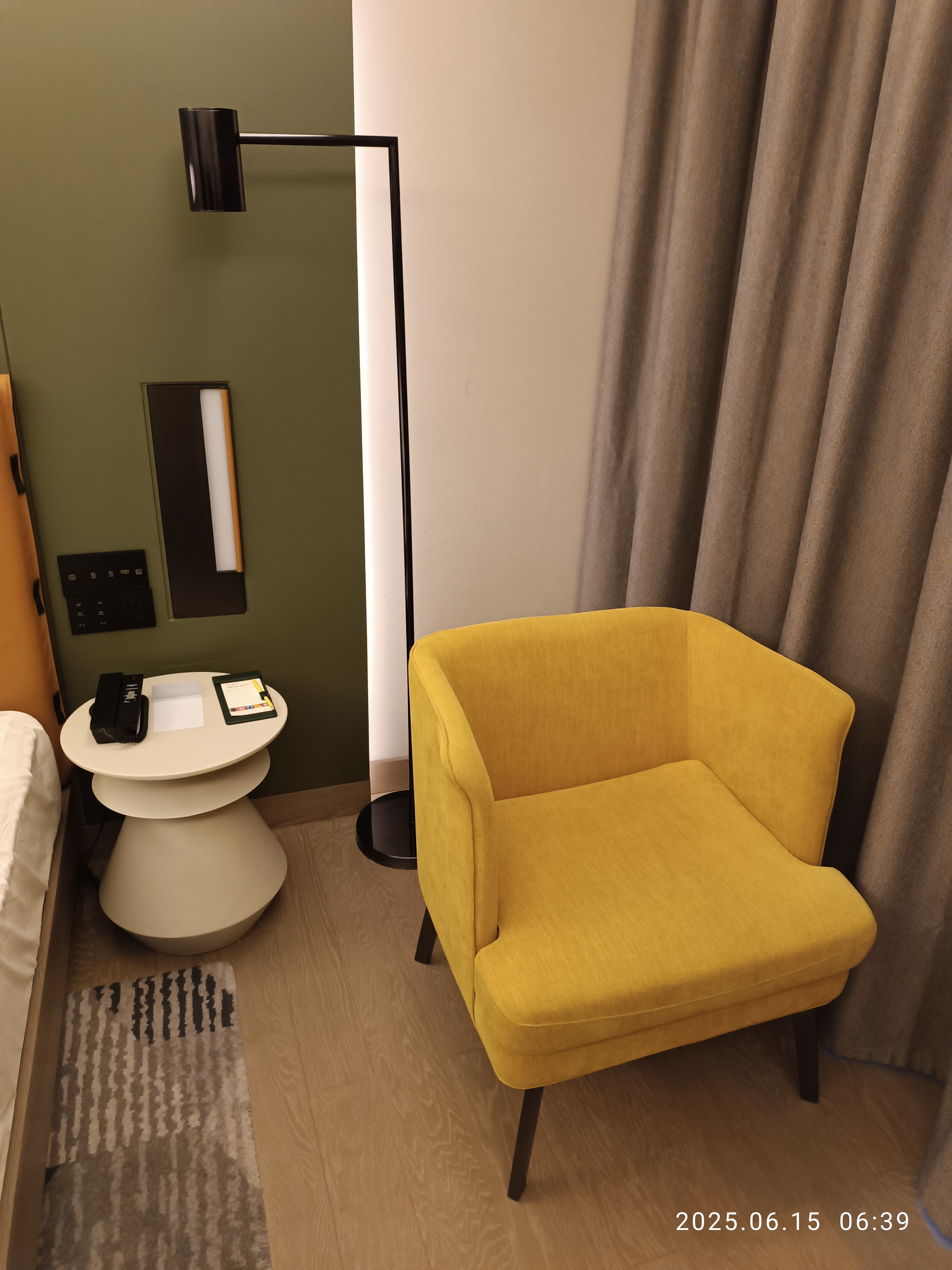
Hotel bedside table with lamps and occasional chair

Occasional furniture refers to small pieces of furniture that can be put to varied uses as the occasion demands. Items such as small tables, nightstands, chests, commodes, and easily moved chairs are usually included in this category.

The term occasional furniture is very generic. For example, occasional tables include end tables, lamp tables, sofa tables, coffee tables, and so forth.

In contrast to occasional furniture, accent furniture tends to be smaller in size, and to serve a more decorative than functional purpose.
