= Trestle =

Trestle or Trestles may refer to:

Structures and structural elements:

  - Trestle support, the structural element that supports a trestle bridge, trestle desk, trestle table, or similar structures
  - Trestle bridge, a bridge composed of trestle support elements
    - Trestles Bridge, a railroad viaduct in California
  - Trestle desk, a desk supported by trestle support elements
  - Trestle table, a table supported by trestle support elements
  - Trestle (mill), part of a post mill consisting of a structure of trestle support elements
  - Trestle tree, a structure that is part of a traditional square rigged sailing ship's top
- Trestle (heraldry), a charge in heraldry depicting a three-legged tripod traditionally used as a stool or table support
- Trestles (surfing), a surfing location in California with a name that refers to a nearby trestle bridge structure
- Trestle (also known as ATLAS-I), a non-nuclear electromagnetic pulse test facility for aircraft supported by the world's largest trestle structure made entirely of wood and glue

== See also ==
- Tressel (disambiguation)
