= Lattice stool =

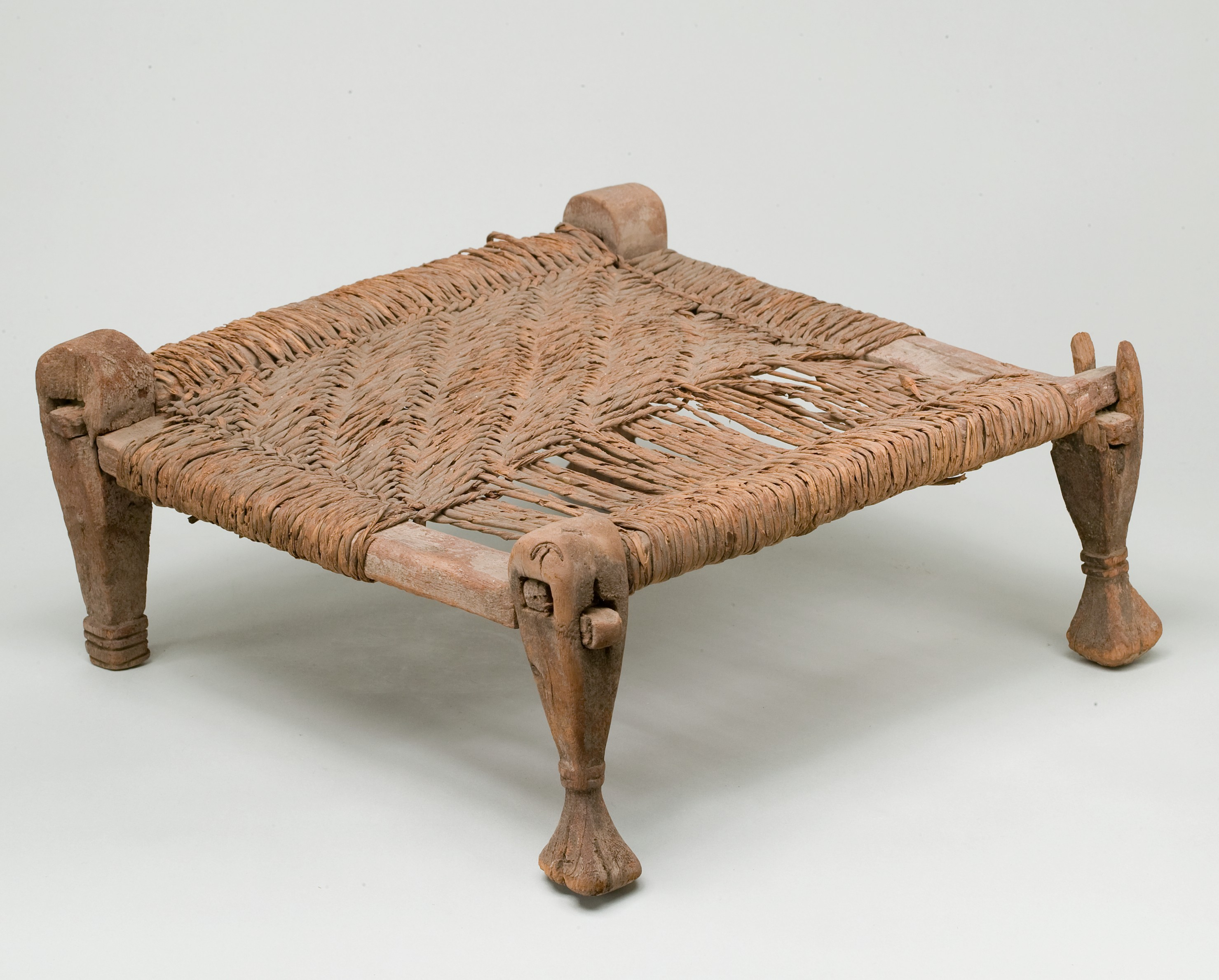
Stool with woven seat, 1991–1450 BC, wood and reed, height: 13 cm; Metropolitan Museum of Art

The lattice stool was the most popular type of stool in ancient Egypt. It is rectangular in form with a combination of features. These features would include: square section legs connected by a perimeter stretcher, a single cove, double cove or flat seat, vertical and diagonal struts joining the stretcher with the seat rail, and a seat surface material that consisted of woven reeds, wooden slats or various natural fibers. Holes were drilled into the seat rails in order to pass the woven material through the holes during the weaving process for a stronger integrity of the seat. Stools were one of the earliest types of seating and were used by all levels of society.

== See also ==
- Latticework
- Caning (furniture)
- Upholstery
