= Latticework =

Ornamental criss-crossed framework

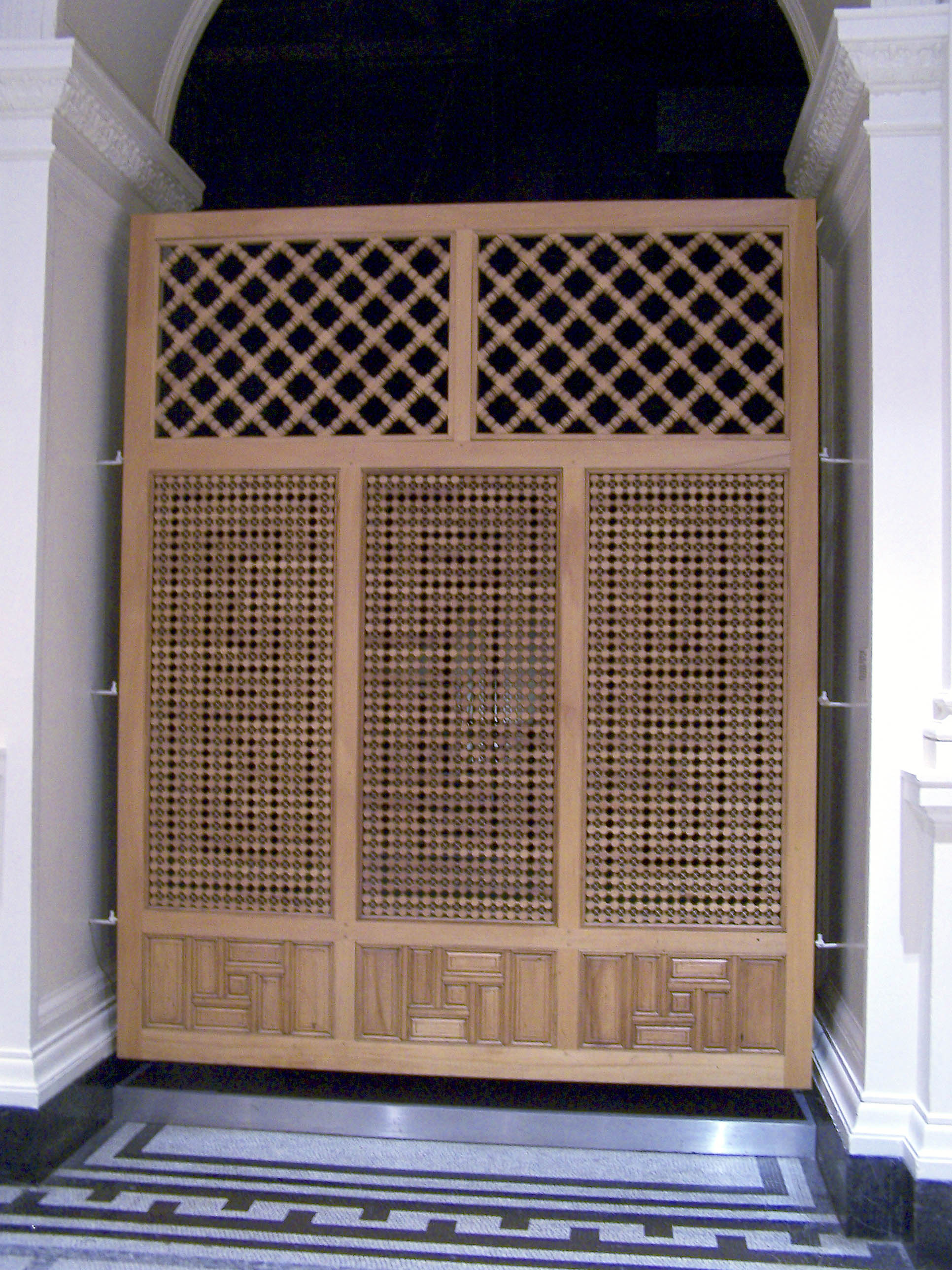
Mashrabiya screen on display at the British Museum

Latticework is an openwork framework consisting of a criss-crossed pattern of strips of building material, typically wood or metal. The design is created by crossing the strips to form a grid or weave. Latticework may be functional – for example, to allow airflow to or through an area; structural, as a truss in a lattice girder; used to add privacy, as through a lattice screen; purely decorative; or some combination of these.

Latticework in stone or wood from the classical period is also called Roman lattice or transenna (plural transenne).

In India, the house of a rich or noble person may be built with a baramdah or verandah surrounding every level leading to the living area. The upper floors often have balconies overlooking the street that are shielded by latticed screens carved in stone called jalis which keep the area cool and give privacy.

== Examples ==
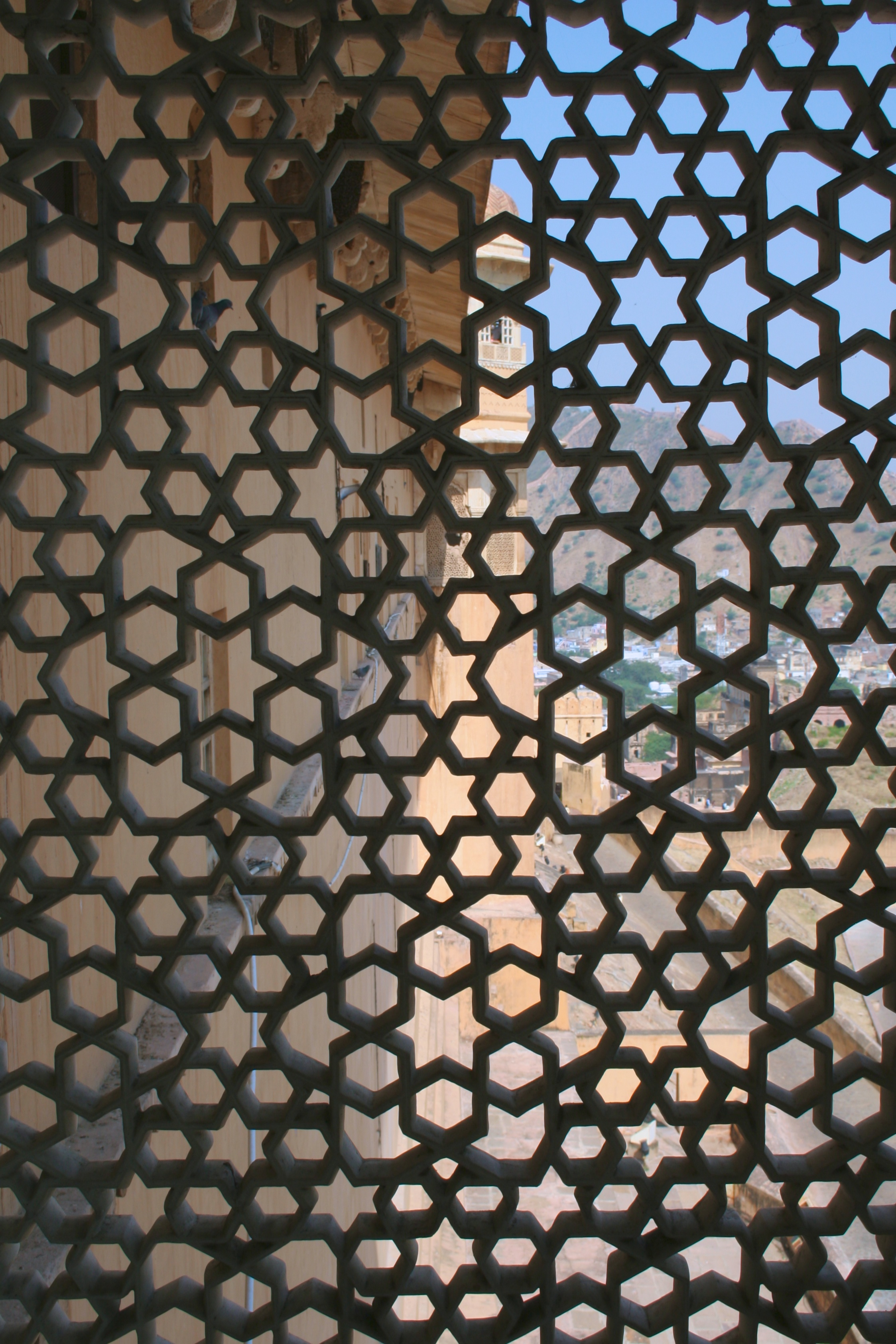
Lattice screen at Amber Fort, c. 1592 CE

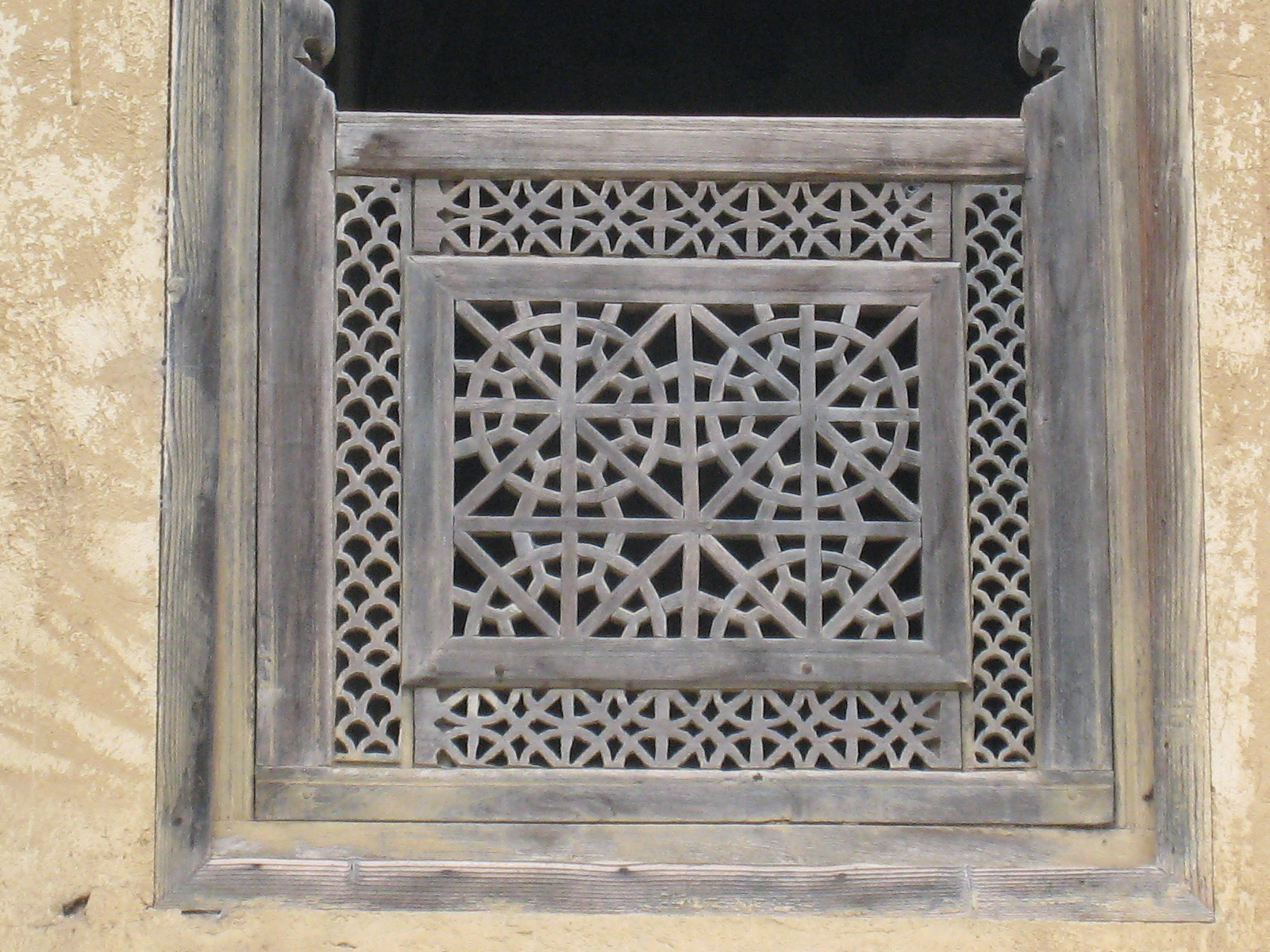
Latticework window in Iran

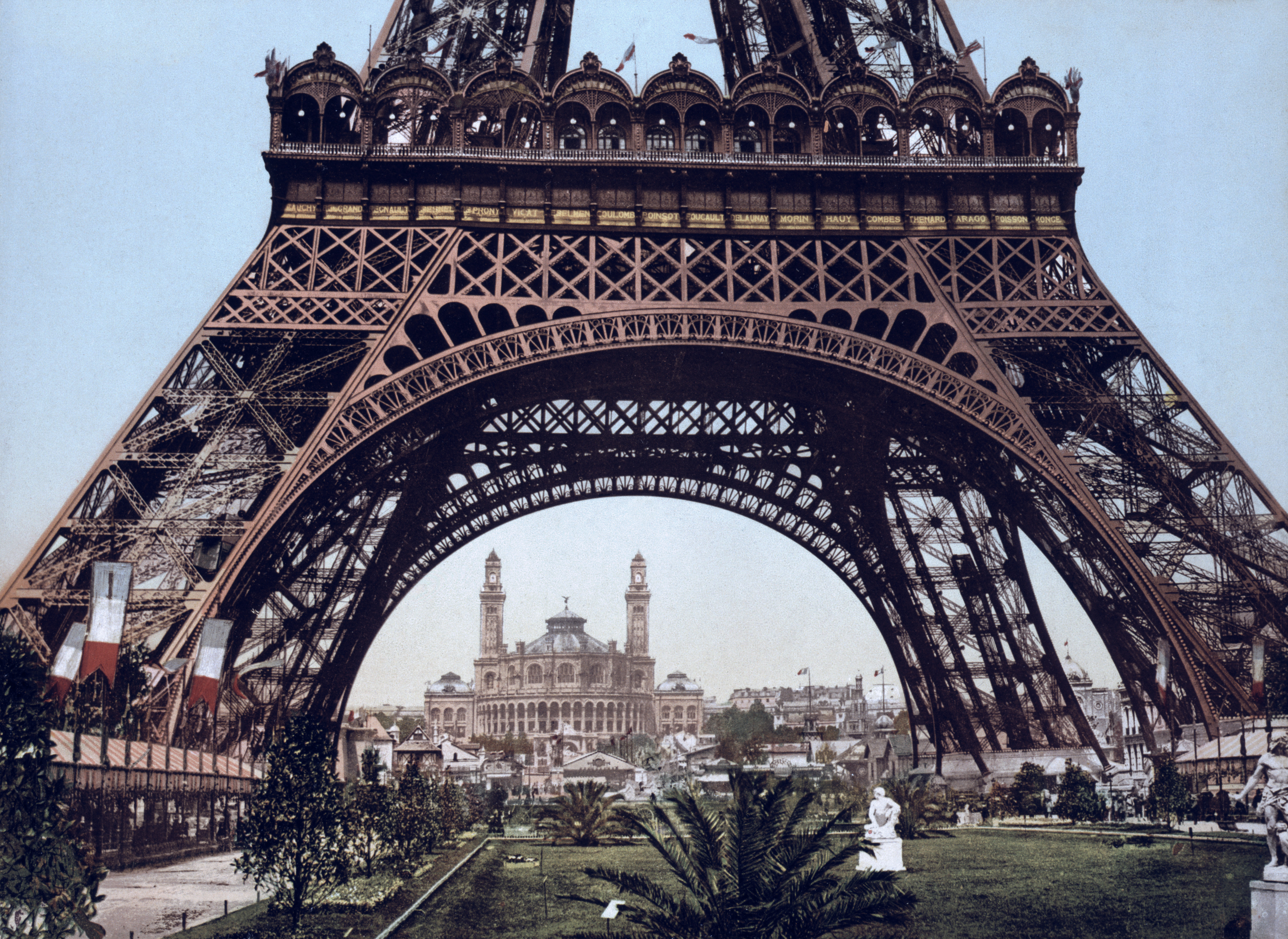
Eiffel Tower structural latticework, c. 1889 CE

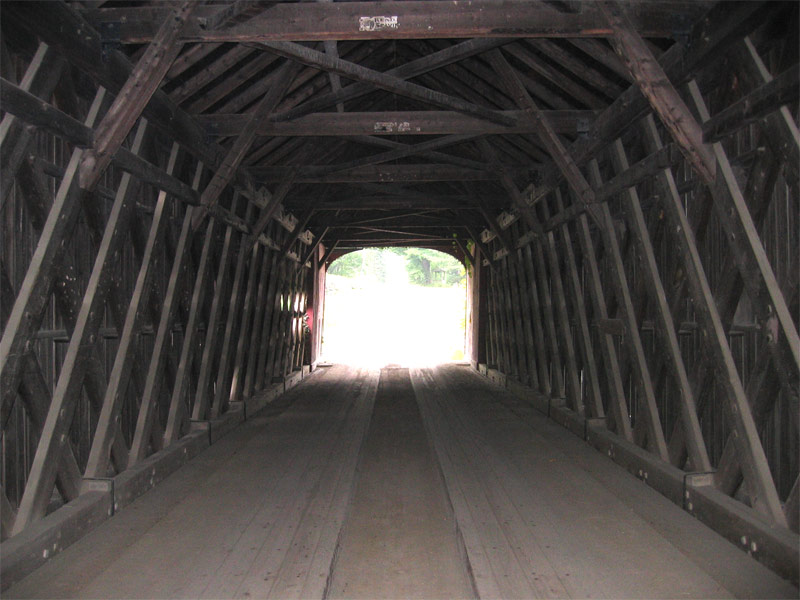
Lattice truss bridge in Vermont

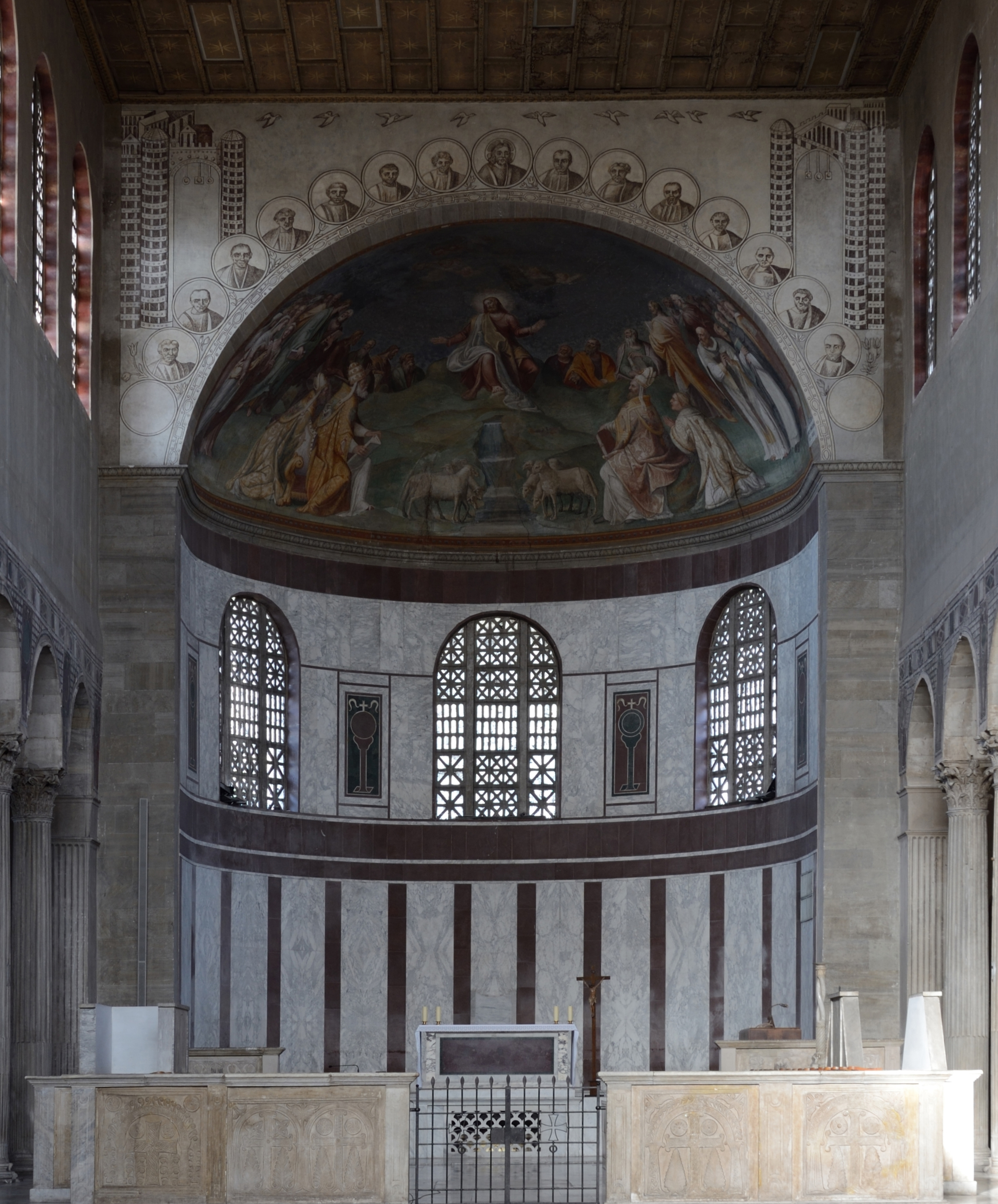
Apse of Santa Sabina, Rome, c. 430 CE

== See also ==
- Brise soleil – Architectural sunshade
- Fretwork – Interlaced decorative design
- Jali – Architectural decoration in Indian architecture
- Lattice tower – Freestanding framework tower
- Lattice truss bridge – Type of truss bridge
- Lattice stool
- Mashrabiya – Islamic architectural element
- Mesh – Interwoven strands of material
- Pergola – Outdoor garden feature forming a shaded walkway
- Reticulum – Constellation in the southern celestial hemisphere
- Tessellation – Covering by shapes without overlaps or gaps
- Trellis (architecture) – Architectural structure often used to support plants
- Truss – Rigid structure that consists of two-force members only
- Wattle (construction) – Panel made by weaving branches
- Yurt – Portable, round tent covered with skins or felt
