= Refectory table =

Elongated rectangular table

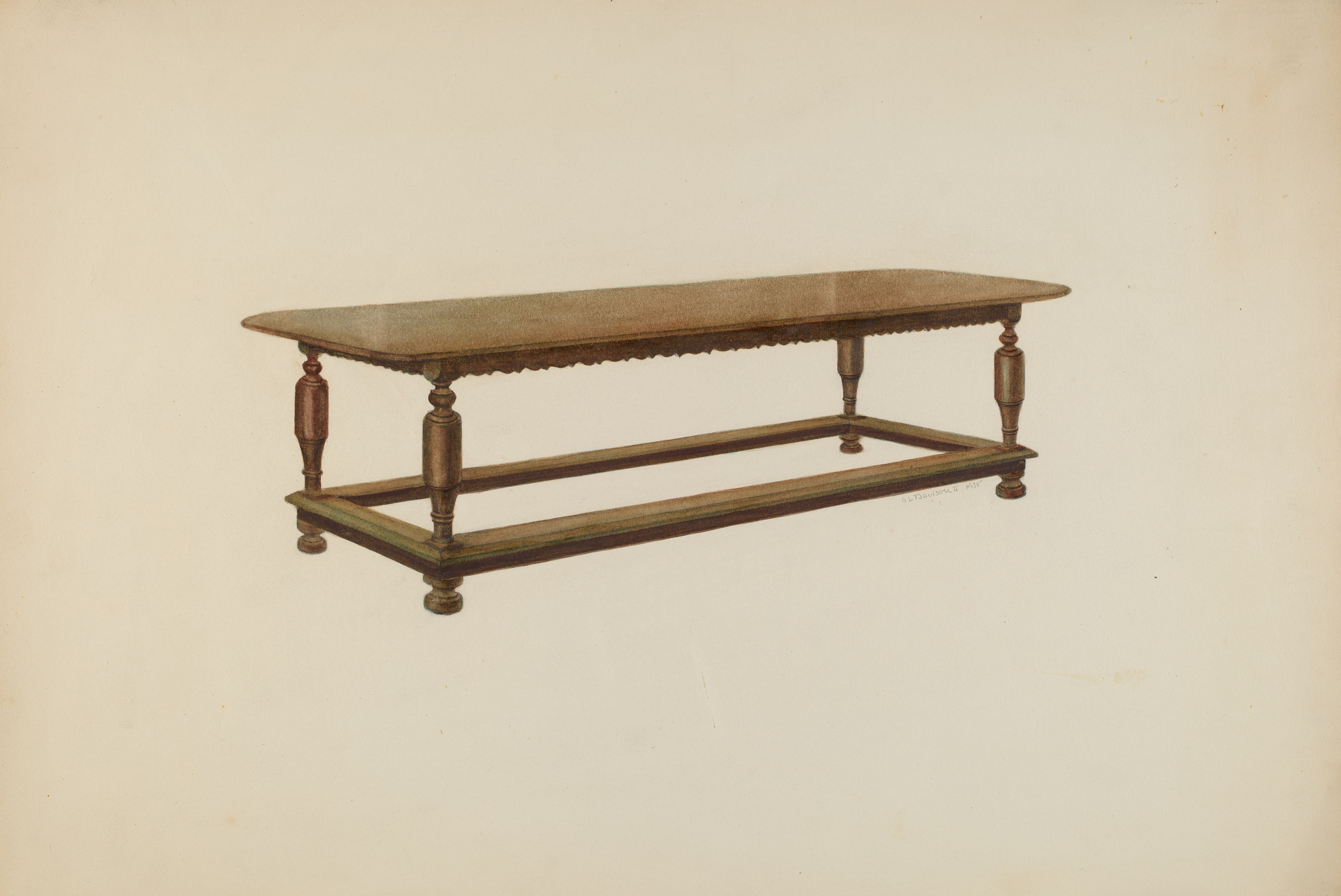
Illustration of a refectory table

Refectory tables in the refectory at the Convent of Christ in Tomar, Portugal

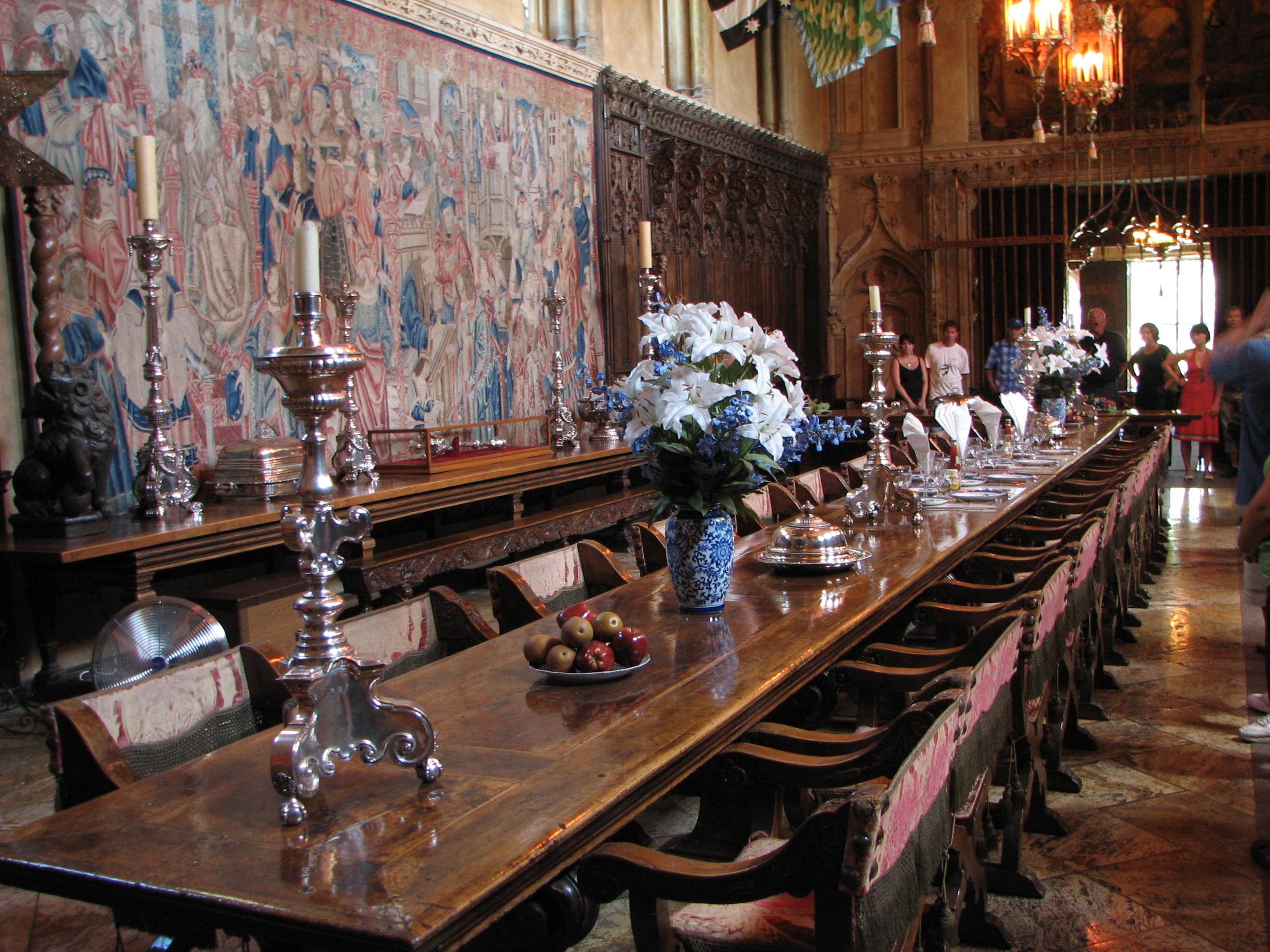
A long refectory table at Hearst Castle in San Simeon, California

A refectory table is a highly elongated table used originally for dining in monasteries during Medieval times. In the Late Middle Ages, the table gradually became a banqueting or feasting table in castles and other noble residences. The original table manufacture was by hand and created of oak or walnut; the design is based on a trestle style. Typically, the table legs are supported by circumferential stretchers positioned very low to the floor.

== History ==
In its original use, one or more refectory tables were placed within the monks' dining hall or refectory. The larger refectories would have a number of refectory tables where monks would take their meals, often while one of the monks read sacred texts from an elevated pulpit, frequently reached from a stone staircase to one side of the refectory. Secular use of the refectory table is thought to have originated in the Mediterranean regions of Europe, where increasingly ornate designs were adopted by Italian and other craftsmen. Adaptation of the refectory table outside the monasteries traveled to central and northern parts of Europe in the late 16th century. For example the Italian artist Giulio Romano traveled to France in the first half of the 16th century and brought concepts of the Italian style to the French court of Francis I. Later in the 16th century the secular refectory table spread to Flemish and German locales. While the Mediterranean refectory tables emphasized the use of walnut, oak wood became equally common in these more northern parts of Europe.

== Notable examples ==
Stanford Hall in Leicestershire, England has numerous areas of early furnishings including one room with original 17th-century furnishings including a refectory table and set of Charles II chairs.

== See also ==
- Great hall
