= Tressell =

Tressell may refer to:

- Robert Tressell, a British writer
- Tressell Ward, a local government ward in Hastings, East Sussex, named after the writer

== See also ==
- Tressel (disambiguation)
