= Hayrake table =

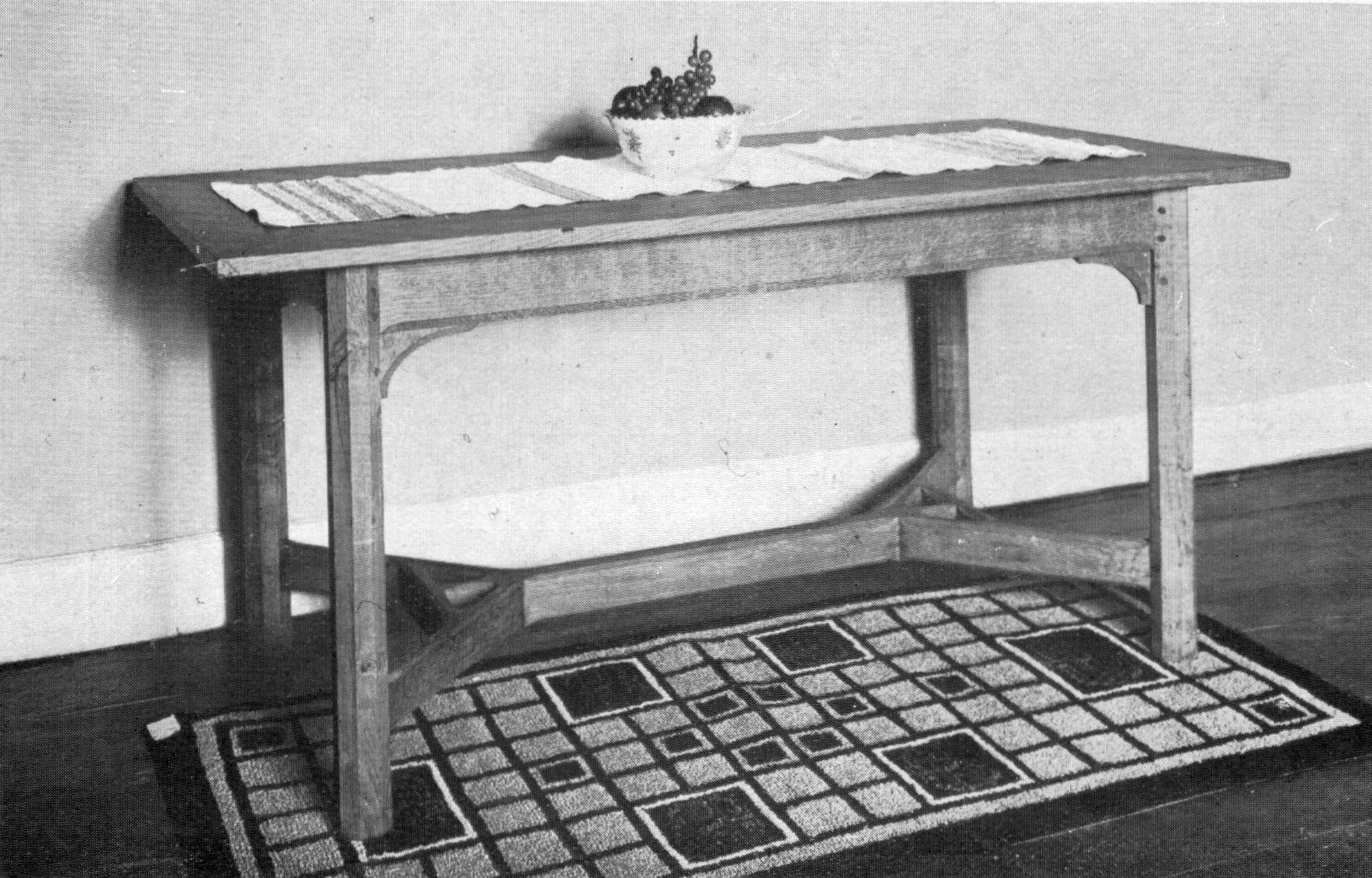
Hayrake table in oak by Gordon Russell

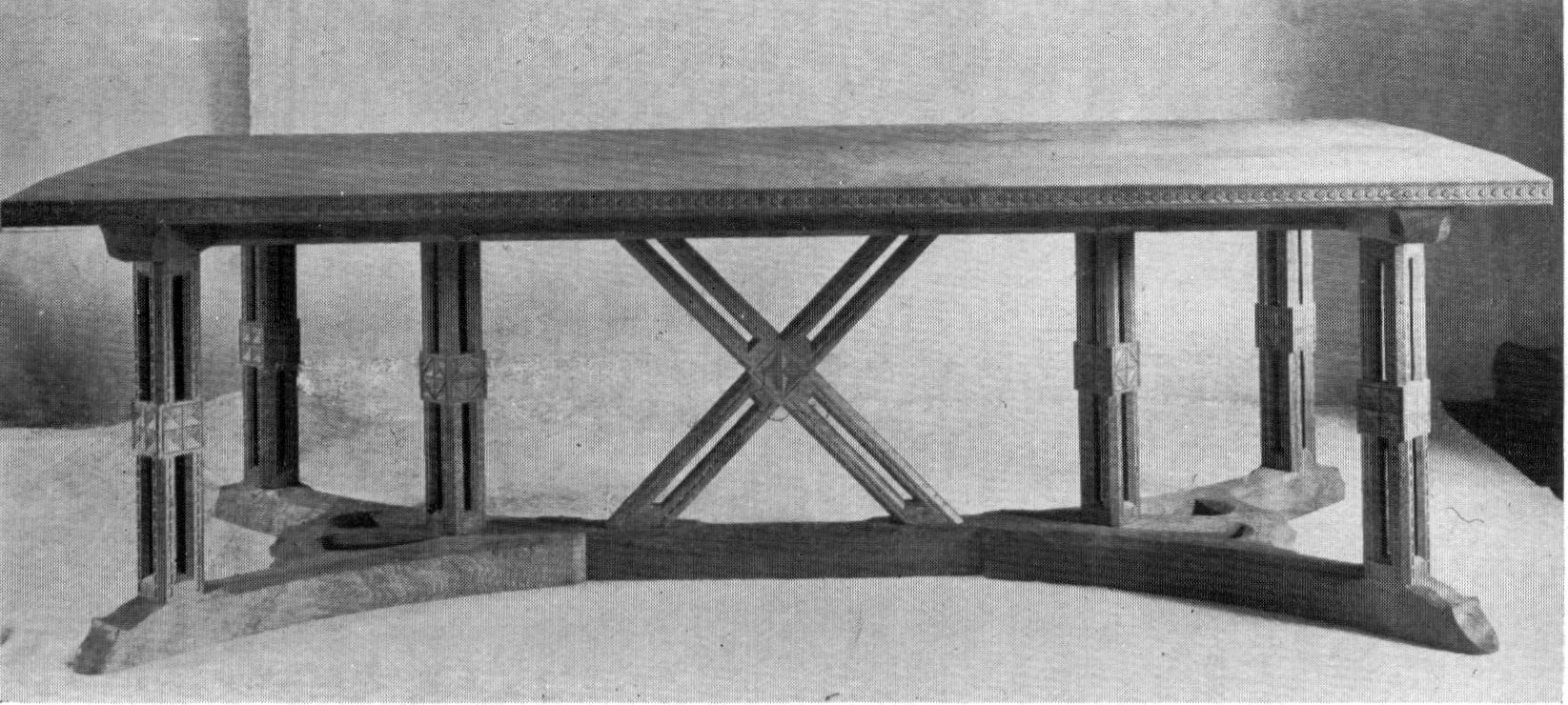
Hayrake table in oak by Peter Waals

A hayrake table is a distinct pattern of table produced as part of the English Arts and Crafts movement in the early part of the twentieth century.

Its distinctive feature is the arrangement of the lower stretcher between the legs as a double-ended Y-shape. The shape of each end, and their joinery, was based on traditional English craft woodworking and the construction of wooden hay rakes. The stretcher is not merely a simple Y shape, but its junction is braced by a T-shaped joint, as was needed for the work of a rake. Some modern reproductions simplify this to a plain Y, abandoning the design's original roots.

These tables are best known as the work of Ernest Gimson and his associates the Barnsley brothers and Peter Waals at their Daneway workshops in Sapperton, Gloucestershire. Other Arts and Crafts designers of the period also produced them, particularly those in the Cotswolds such as Gordon Russell

Timber used in their construction was, as for other Arts and Crafts work, locally grown English hardwoods. Most were produced in oak although some, like the original hay rakes, were made in ash.

The design varies between makers, mostly in its details. Gimson's tables are considered the finest and the canonical example of the design. Their edges are heavily chamfered, a typically Gimson feature, which is derived from the finishing of the original agricultural tools. This chamfer also has the practical benefit for a table stretcher of reduced wear from feet on an otherwise sharp edge. Gimson's distinctive use of gentle stopped chamfers evokes the framing of Gloucestershire wagons. Gimson's tables also have their edges finished with bands of chip carving or sometimes with inlaid bands of light holly and dark bog oak. Peter Waals produced the tables for some time after the death of Gimson and, as with many of his pieces, updated their Arts and Crafts detailing to follow the post-war fashions of Modernism and Art Deco.

Although less well-known than some other iconic Arts and Crafts pieces, the hayrake table remains a popular design to this day. They are produced both commercially and as plans for hobbyists.
