= Refectory =

Dining room in institutions

The refectory of the Convent of Christ in Tomar, Portugal

A refectory (also frater, frater house, fratery) is a dining room, especially in monasteries, boarding schools and academic institutions. One of the places the term is most often used today is in graduate seminaries. The name derives from the Latin reficere 'to remake or restore', via Late Latin refectorium, which means 'a place one goes to be restored' (cf. restaurant).

== Refectories and monastic culture ==
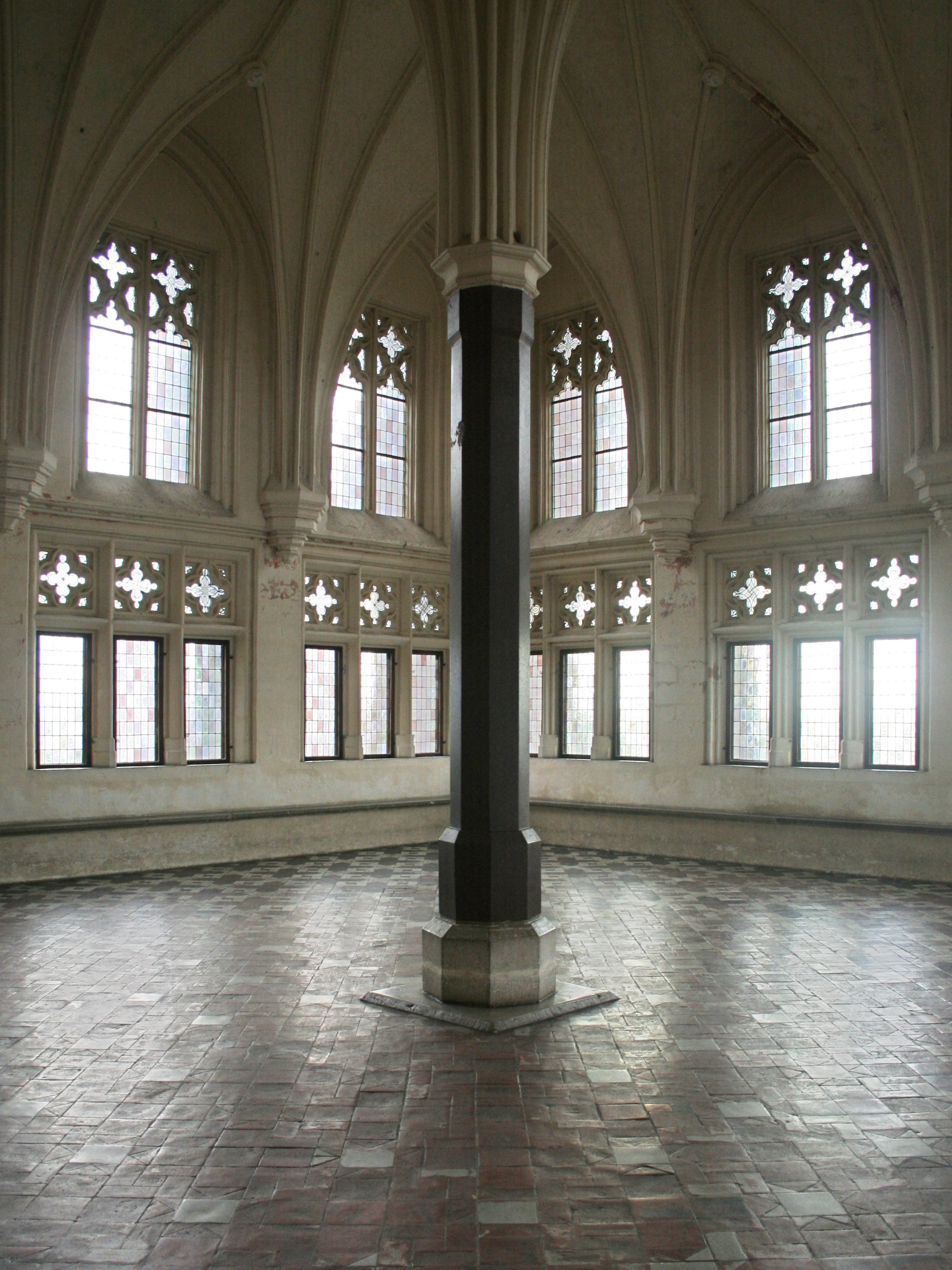
Summer Refectory in the Grand Masters' Palace, Malbork Castle

Communal meals are the times when all monks of an institution are together. Diet and eating habits differ somewhat by monastic order, and more widely by schedule. The Benedictine rule is illustrative.

The Rule of St Benedict orders two meals. Dinner is provided year-round; supper is also served from late spring to early fall, except for Wednesdays and Fridays. The diet originally consisted of simple fare: two dishes, with fruit as a third course if available. The food was simple, with the meat of mammals forbidden to all but the sick. Moderation in all aspects of diet is the spirit of Benedict's law. Meals are eaten in silence, facilitated sometimes by hand signals. A single monk might read aloud from the Scriptures or writings of the saints during the meals.

== Size, structure, and placement ==
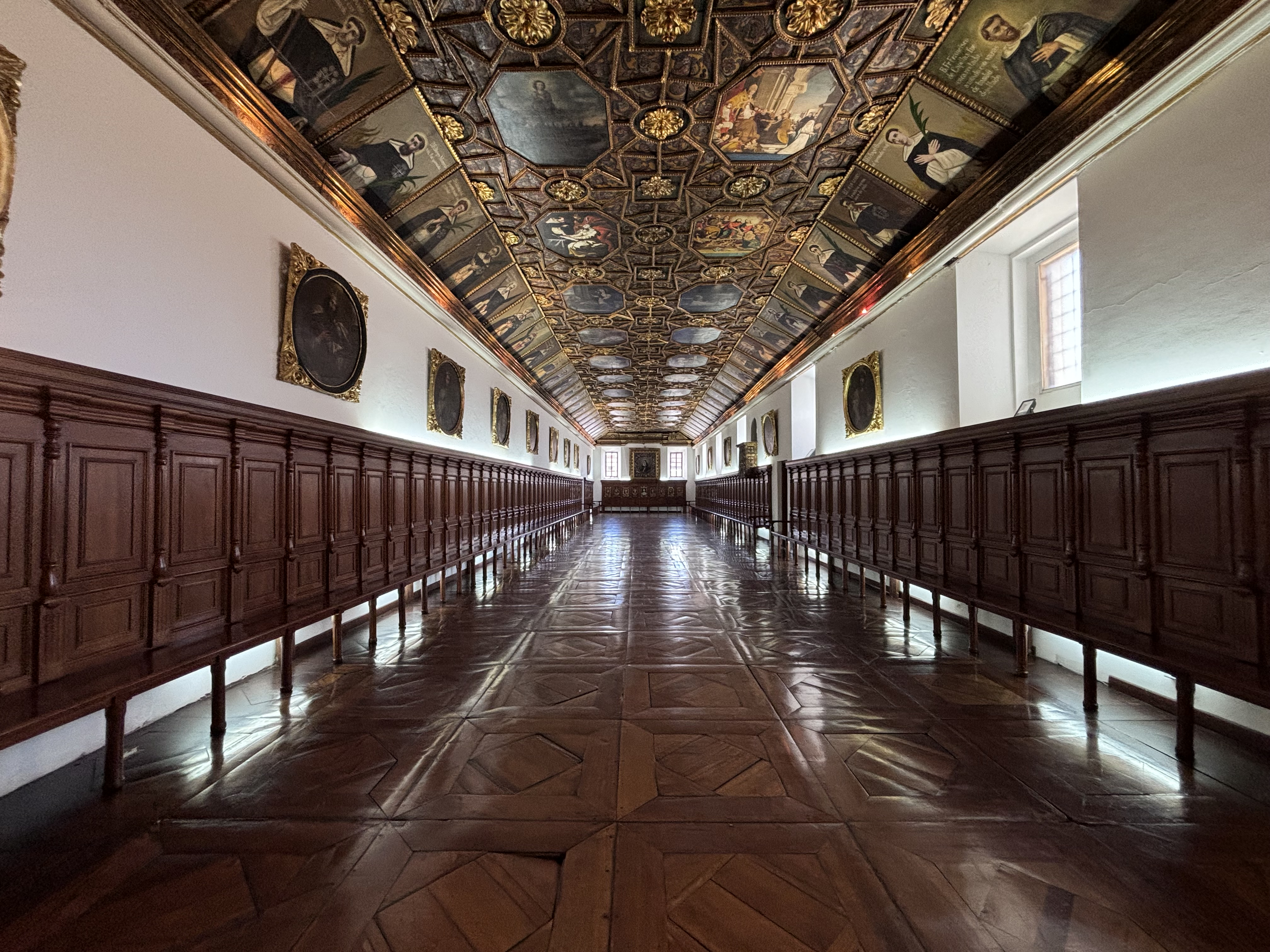
Refectory of the Convent of Santo Domingo, Quito.

Refectories vary in size and dimension, based primarily on wealth and size of the monastery, as well as when the room was built. They share certain design features. Monks eat at long benches; important officials sit at raised benches at one end of the hall. A lavabo, or large basin for hand-washing, usually stands outside the refectory.

Tradition also fixes other factors. In England, the refectory is generally built on an undercroft (perhaps in an allusion to the upper room where the Last Supper reportedly took place) on the side of the cloister opposite the church. Benedictine models are traditionally generally laid out on an east–west axis, while Cistercian models lie north–south.

Norman refectories could be as large as 160 feet (49 m) long by 35 feet (11 m) wide (such as the abbey at Norwich). Even relatively early refectories might have windows, but these became larger and more elaborate in the high medieval period. The refectory at Cluny Abbey was lit through thirty-six large glazed windows. The twelfth-century abbey at Mont Saint-Michel had six windows, five feet wide by twenty feet high.

== Eastern Orthodox ==
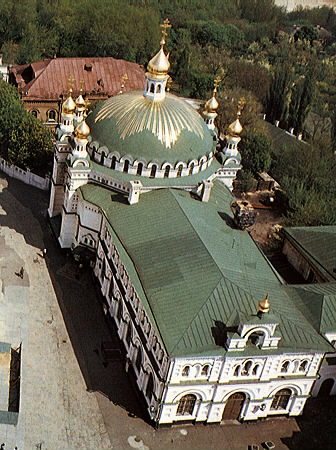
Trapezna (refectory church) at the Kyiv Pechersk Lavra

In Eastern Orthodox monasteries, the trapeza (Greek: τραπεζαρία, refectory) is considered a sacred place, and in some cases is even constructed as a full church with an altar and iconostasis. Some services are intended to be performed specifically in the trapeza. There is always at least one icon with a lampada (oil lamp) kept burning in front of it. The service of the Lifting of the Panagia is performed at the end of meals. During Bright Week, this service is replaced with the Lifting of the Artos. In some monasteries, the Ceremony of Forgiveness at the beginning of Great Lent is performed in the trapeza. All food served in the trapeza should be blessed, and for that purpose, holy water is often kept in the kitchen.

== Modern usage ==
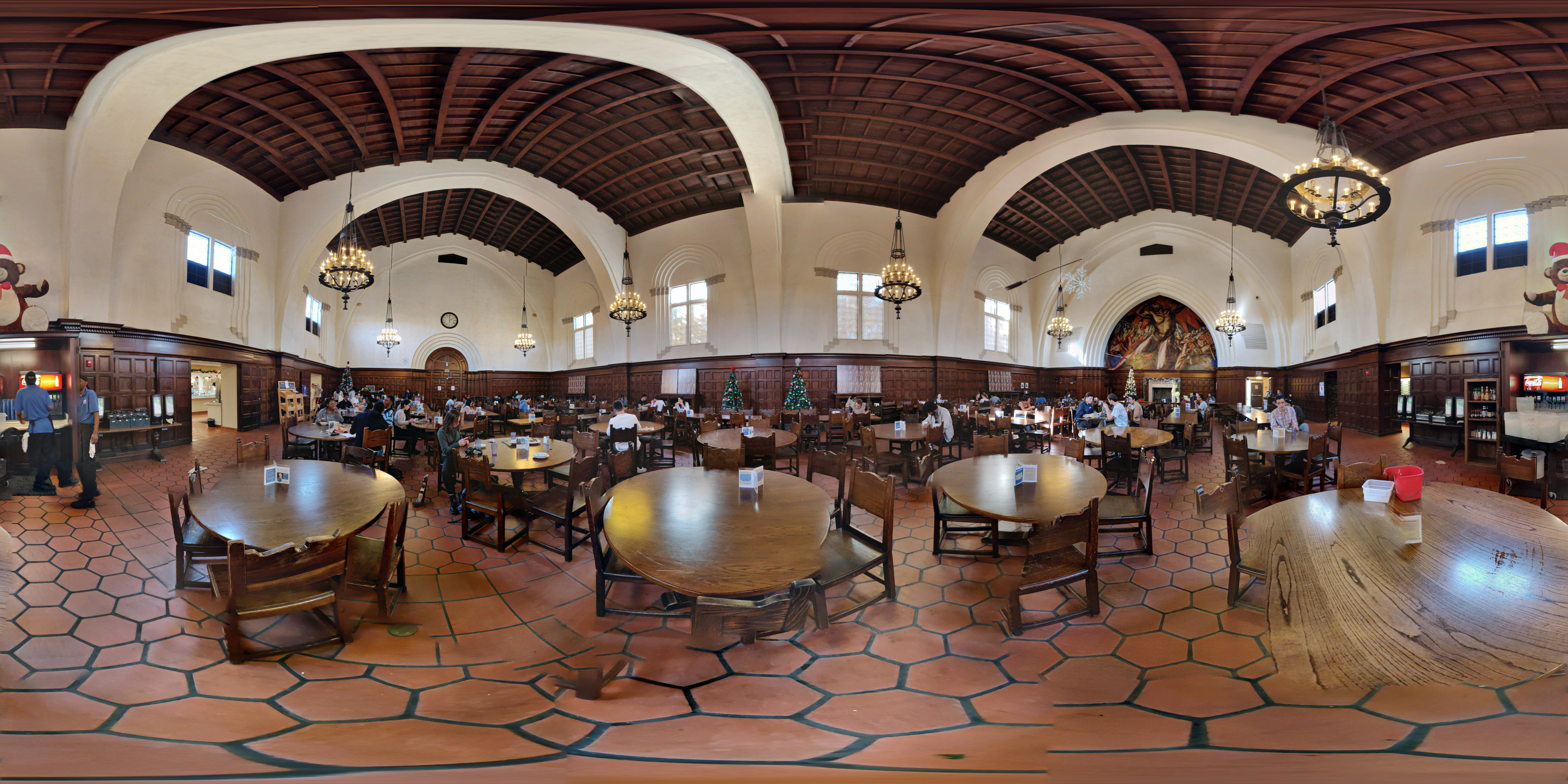
The refectory at Pomona College's Frary Dining Hall in 2018 (View as a 360° panorama)

As well as continued use of the historic monastic meaning, the word refectory is often used in a modern context to refer to a café or cafeteria that is open to the public—including non-worshipers such as tourists—attached to a cathedral or abbey. This usage is particularly prevalent in Church of England buildings, which use the takings to supplement their income.

Many universities in the UK also call their student cafeteria or dining facilities the refectory. The term is rare at American colleges, although Brown University calls its main dining hall the Sharpe Refectory, the main dining hall at Rhodes College is known as the Catherine Burrow Refectory, and, in August of 2019, Villanova University chose the name 'The Refectory' for the "sophisticated-yet-casual restaurant service" (open to students and the public) to purposefully acknowledge and recognize the history of the refectory name to connote "a dining room for communal meals at academic institutions and monasteries".

== See also ==
- Refectory table

== Sources ==
- Adams, Henry, Mont Saint-Michel and Chartres. New York: Penguin, 1986.
- Fernie, E. C. The Architecture of Norman England. Oxford: Oxford University Press, 2000.
- Harvey, Barbara. Living and Dying in England, 1100-1450. Oxford: Clarendon Press, 1995.
- Singman, Jeffrey. Daily Life in Medieval Europe. Westport, CT: Greenwood Press, 1999.
- Webb, Geoffrey. Architecture in Britain: the Middle Ages. Baltimore: Penguin, 1956.
