= Hay rake =

Type of rake

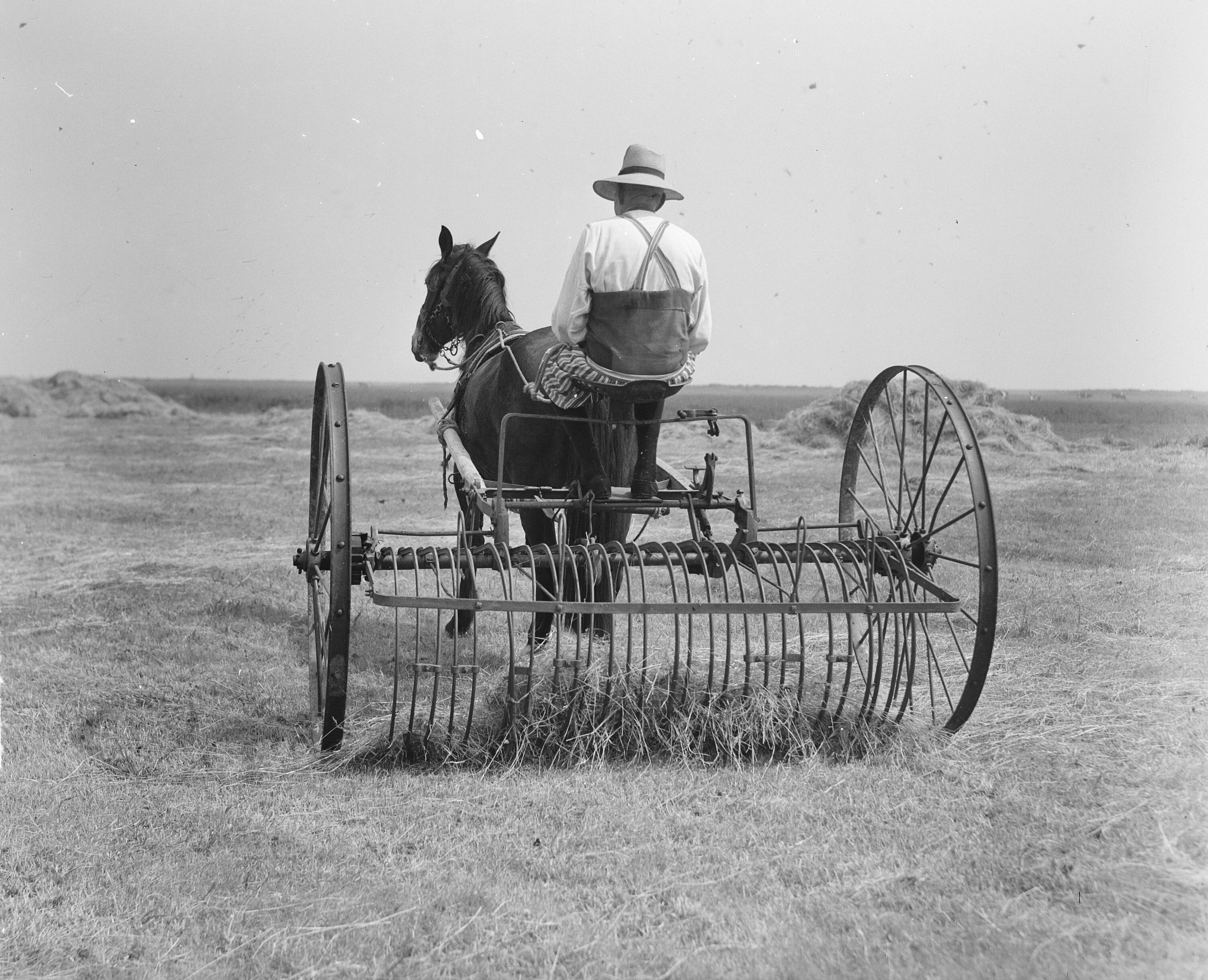
Dump rake

A Molon 120 Mini side-delivery belt rake raking hay into a windrow.

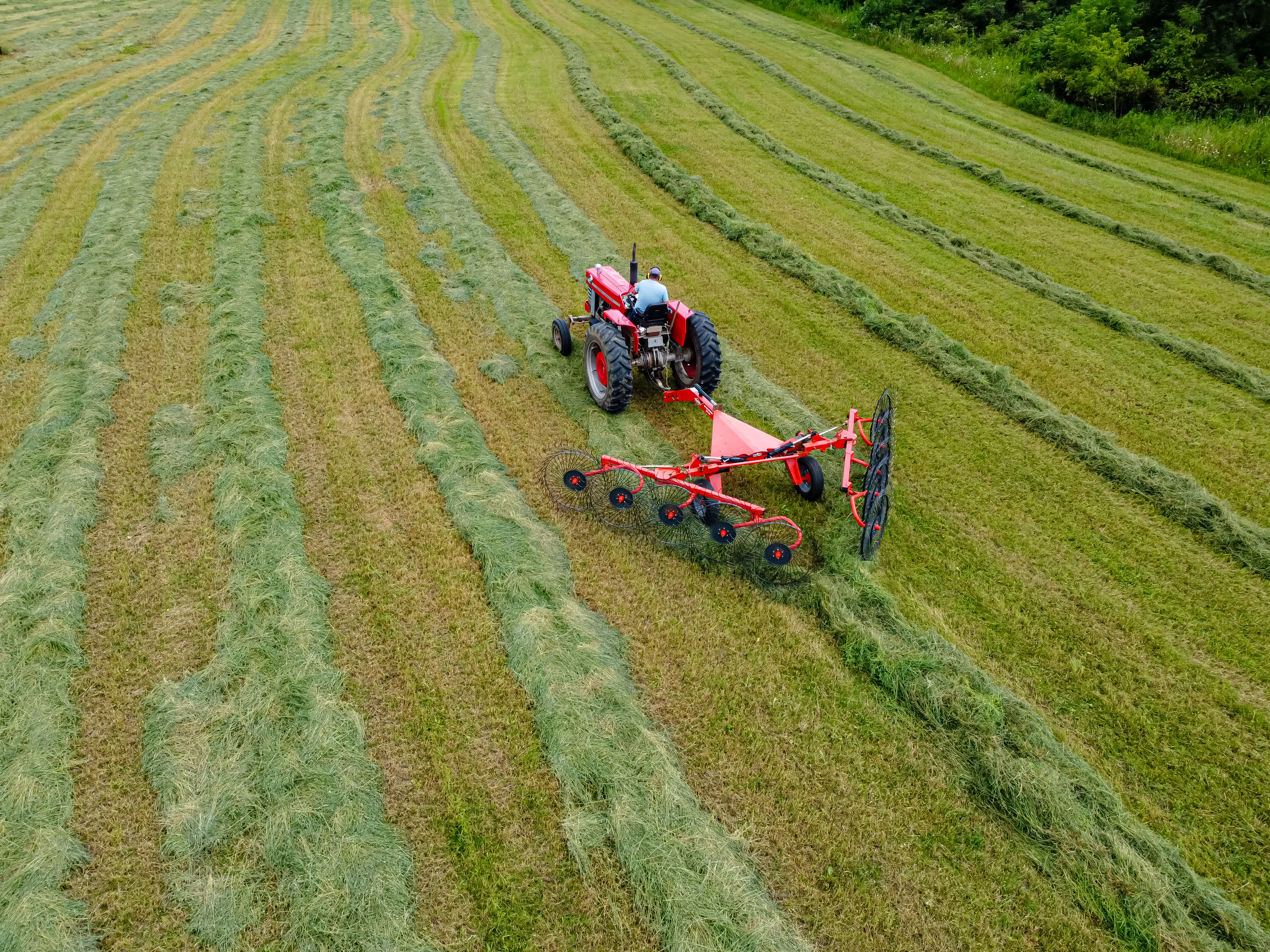
Wheeled hay rake (Click for video)

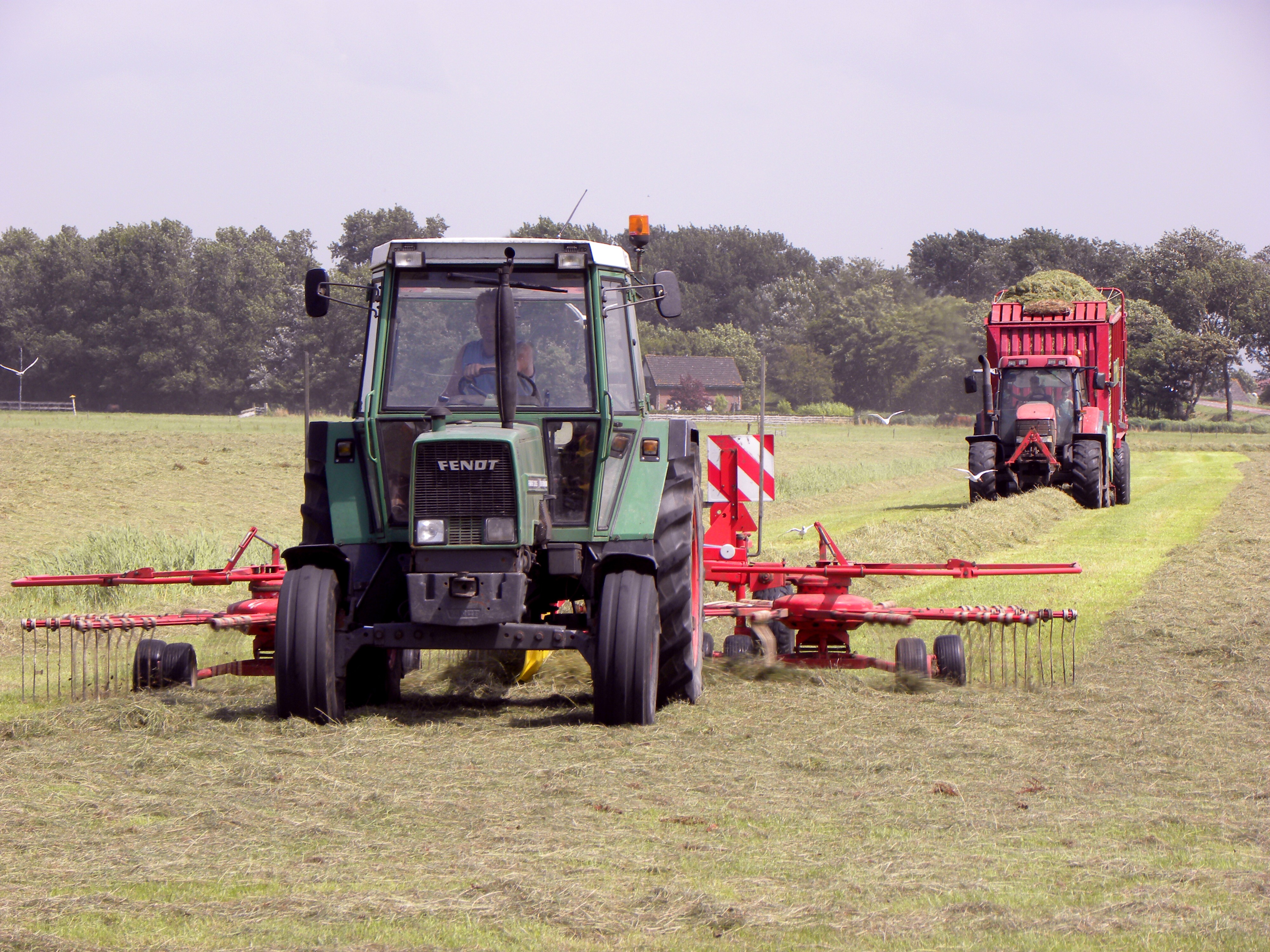
A tractor with a rotary rake forms a windrow, another one with a loader wagon follows and collects the hay for silage.

A hay rake is an agricultural rake used to collect cut hay or straw into windrows for later collection (e.g. by a baler or a loader wagon). It is also designed to fluff up the hay and turn it over so that it may dry. It is also used in the evening to protect the hay from morning dew. The next day a tedder is used to spread it again, so that the hay dries more quickly.

== Types ==
A hay rake may be mechanized, drawn by a tractor or draft animals, or it may be a hand tool. The earliest hay rakes were nothing more than tree branches, but wooden hand rakes with wooden teeth, similar in design to a garden rake but larger, were prevalent in the 19th and early 20th centuries, and still are used in some locations around the world. Hay rakes were among the first agricultural tools to become popular in the shift from human manual labor to animal labor in the 19th century.

The typical early horse-drawn hay rake was a dump rake, a wide two-wheeled implement with curved steel or iron teeth usually operated from a seat mounted over the rake with a lever-operated lifting mechanism. This rake gathered cut hay into windrows by repeated operation perpendicular to the windrow, requiring the operator to raise the rake, turn around and drop the teeth to rake back and forth in order to form the windrow. In some areas, a sweep rake, which could also be a horse-drawn or tractor-mounted implement, could then be used to pick up the windrowed hay and load it onto a wagon.

Later, a mechanically more complicated rake was developed, known as the side delivery rake. This usually had a gear-driven or chain-driven reel mounted roughly at a 45-degree angle to the windrow, so the hay was gathered and pushed to one side of the rake as it moved across the field. A side delivery rake could be pulled longitudinally along the windrow by horses or a tractor, eliminating the laborious and inefficient process of raising, lowering, and back-and-forth raking required by a dump rake. This allowed for the continuous spiraling windrows of a classic mid-20th-century farm hayfield. Later versions of the side delivery rake used a more severe transverse angle and a higher frame system, but the basic principles of operation were the same.

Still later, a variety of wheel rakes or star wheel rakes were developed, with 5, 6, 7 or more spring-tooth encircled wheels mounted on a frame and ground driven by free-wheeling contact as the implement was pulled forward. These rakes were variously promoted as being mechanically simpler and trouble-free, gentler on the hay than a side-delivery rake, and cheaper to operate.

Currently a newer design called the rotary rake is in common use in Europe, and less frequently seen in the United States and Canada.

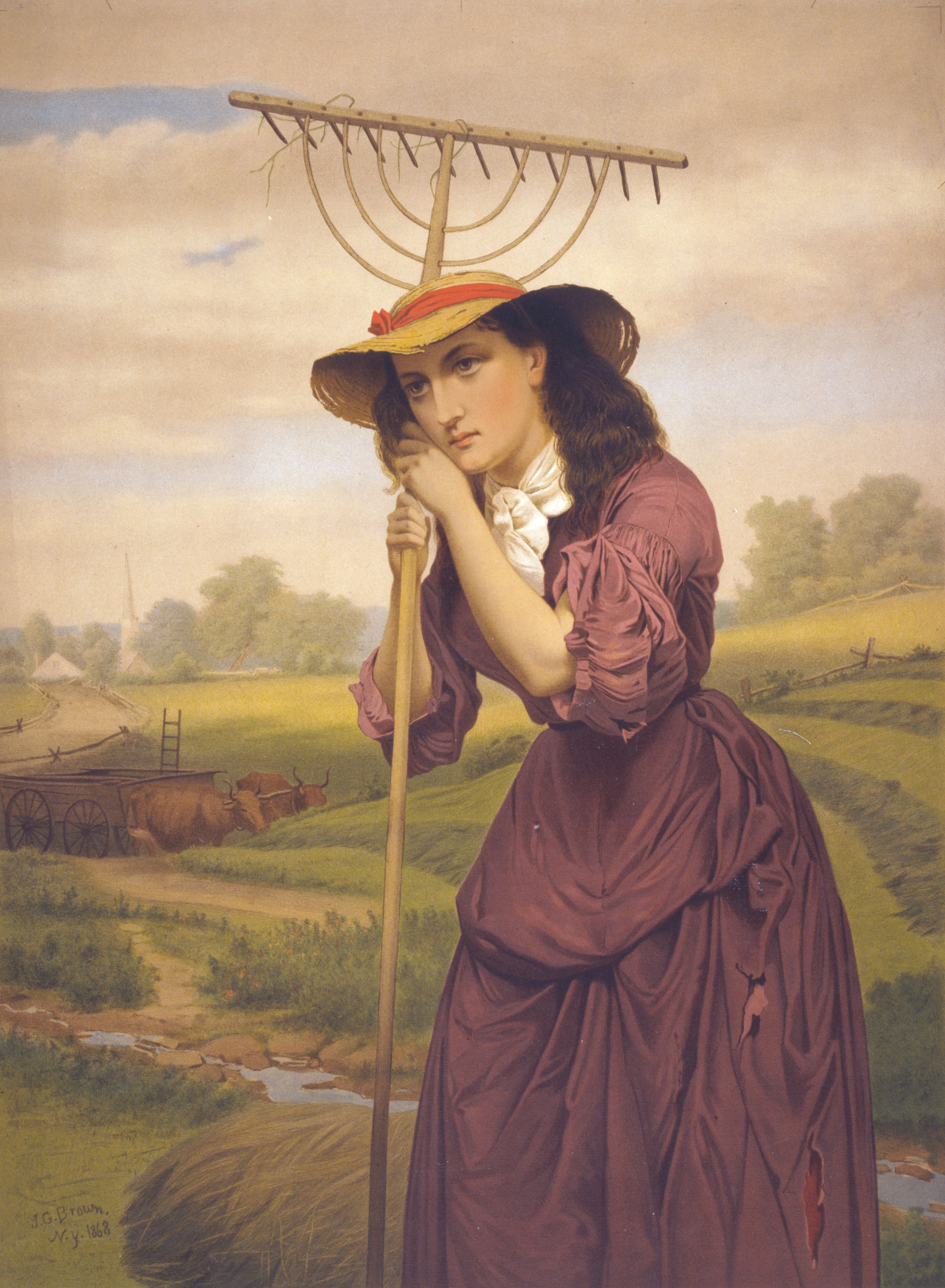
A 19th-century hand-tool hay rake

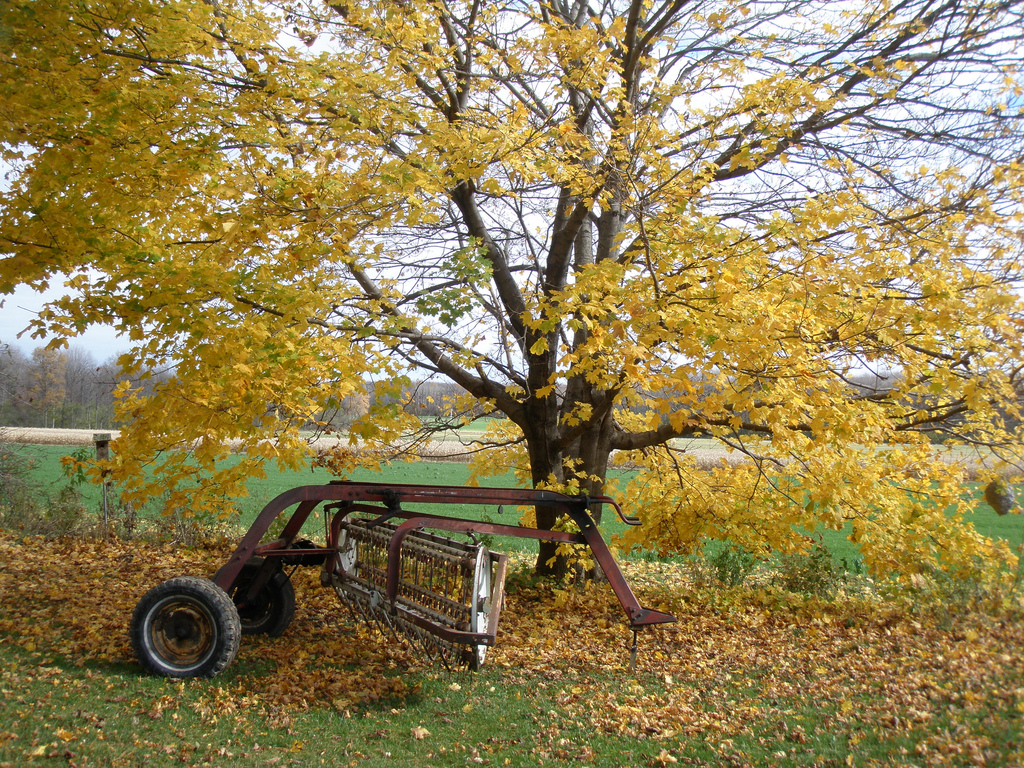
A late version of the side delivery rake

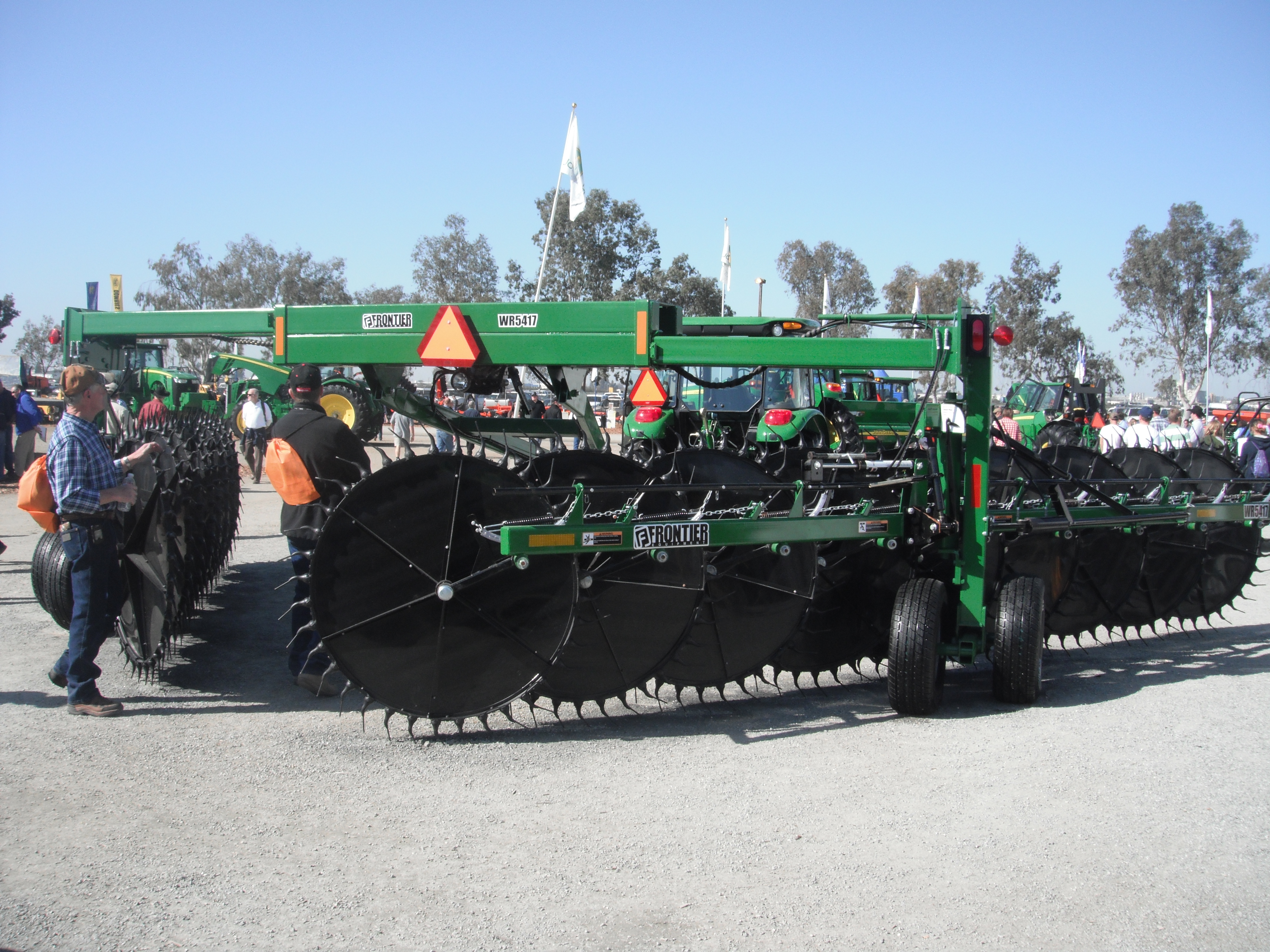
A wheel rake

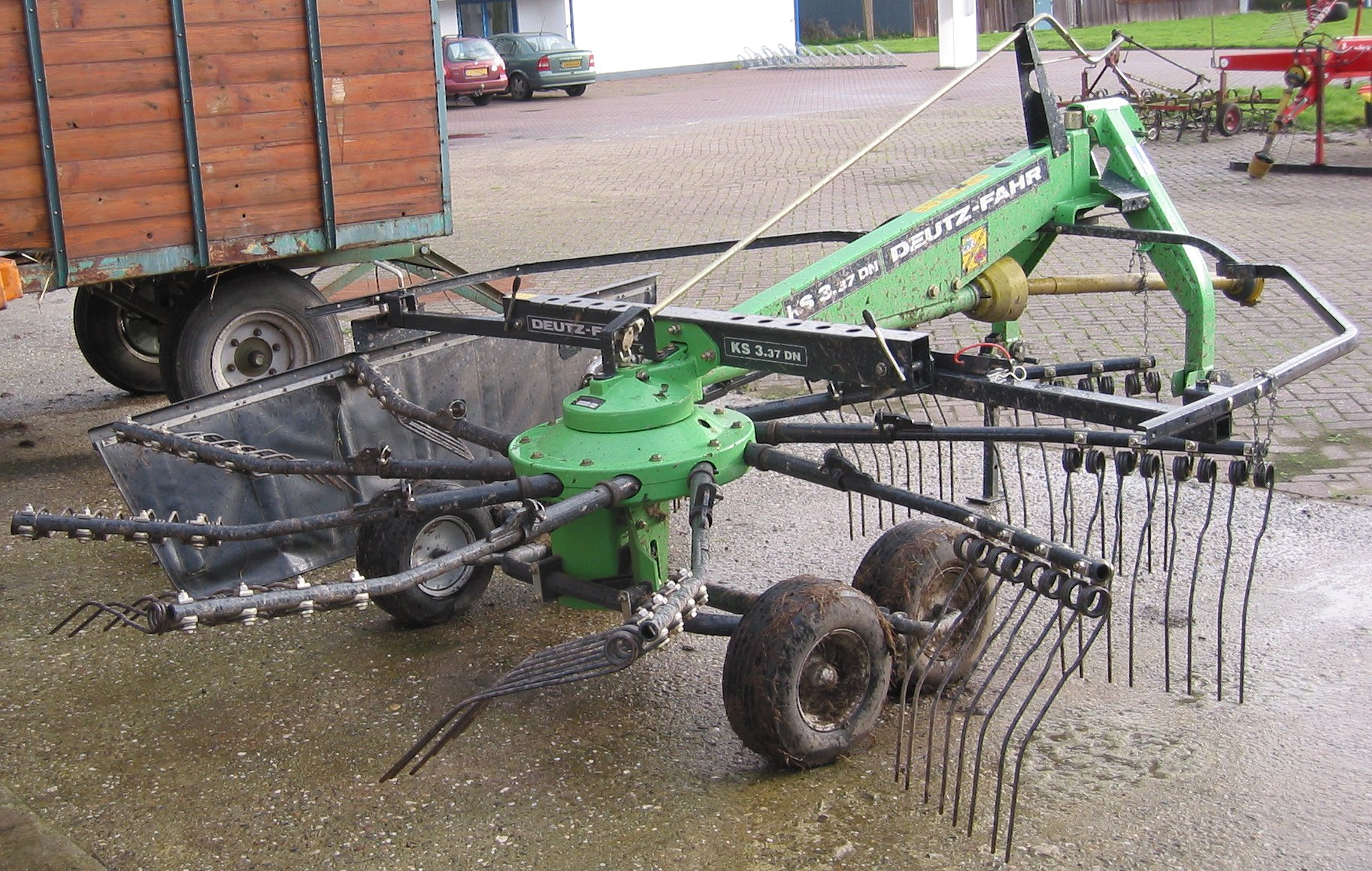
A rotary rake

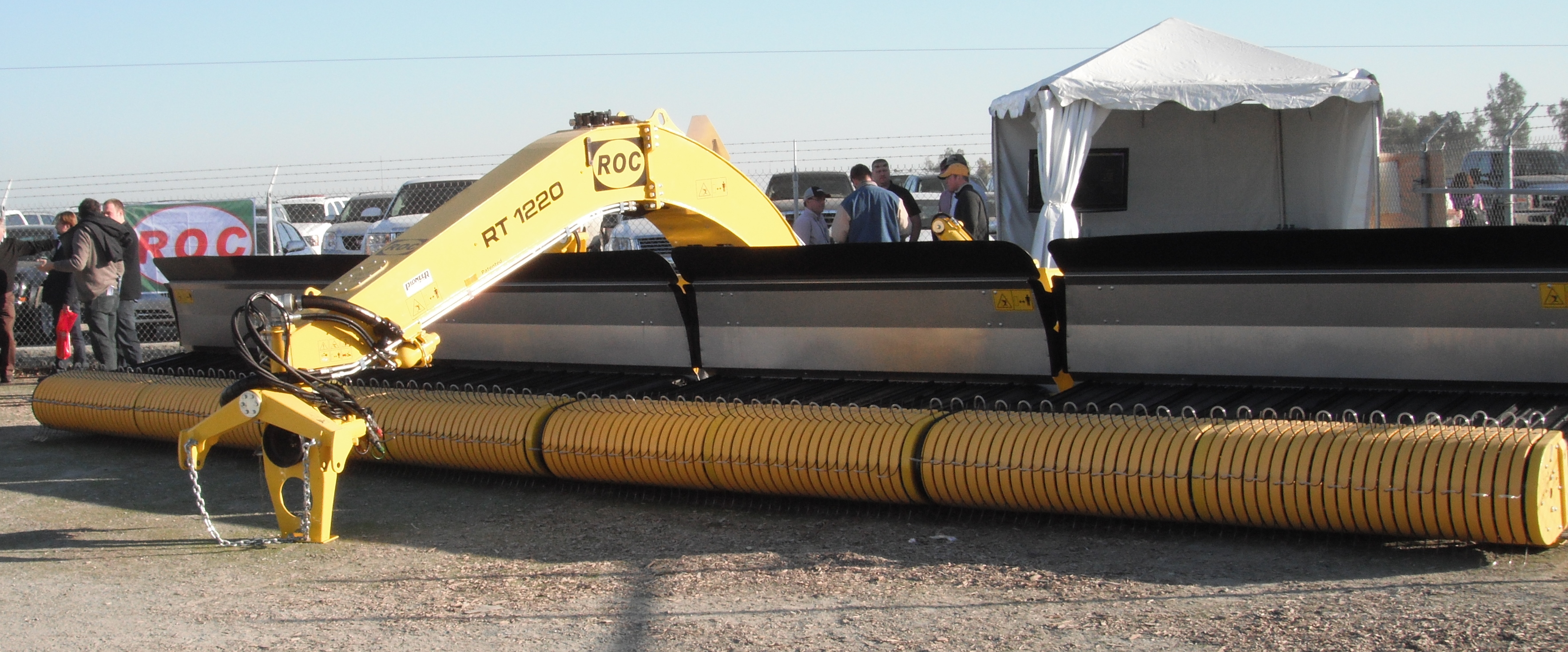
A pick-up belt rake ("continuous belt merger")

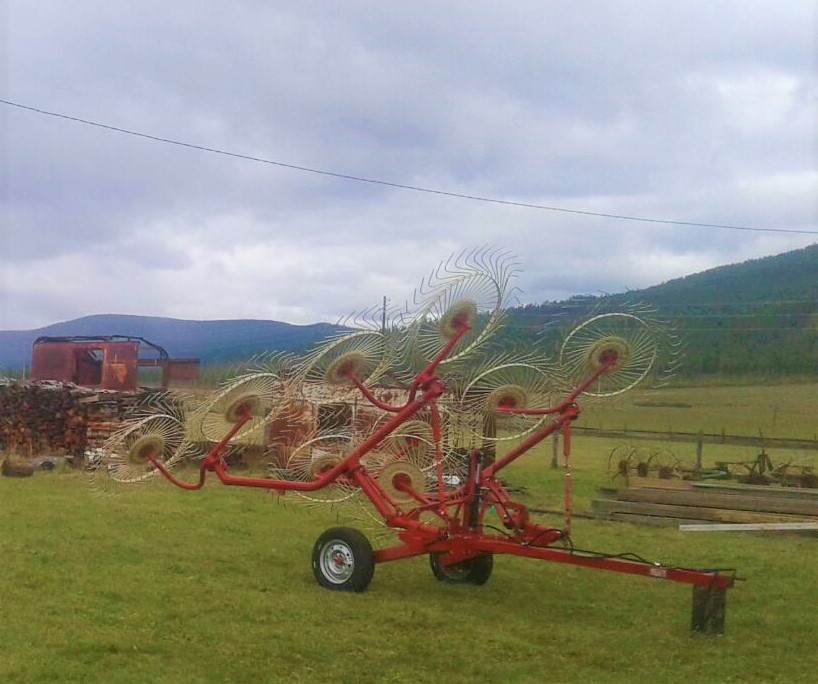
Wheel-finger rake (in folded transport position) for raking hay or straw into windrows for the baler

== List of notable manufacturers ==
- New Holland
- Claas
- Molon
- Fella
- Kverneland with the Brands Vicon and Deutz-Fahr

== See also ==
- List of agricultural machinery
- Hayrake table
