= Tressel =

Tressel may refer to:

- Gertrude Tressel Rider (1876–1968), American librarian
- Dick Tressel (born c. 1948), American football coach
- Jim Tressel (born 1952), American football coach
- Lee Tressel (1925–1981), American football coach
- Mária Tressel (born 1946), Hungarian gymnast
- Markus Tressel (born 1977), German politician
- Mike Tressel (born 1973), American football coach
- A character in the play Richard III
- Stackton Tressel, a fictional English village

== See also ==
- Tressell (disambiguation)
- Tressel Field
- Trestle bridge, a type of bridge
- Trestle table, an item of furniture
- Trestles, a surf spot
