= Trestle desk =

Type of furniture

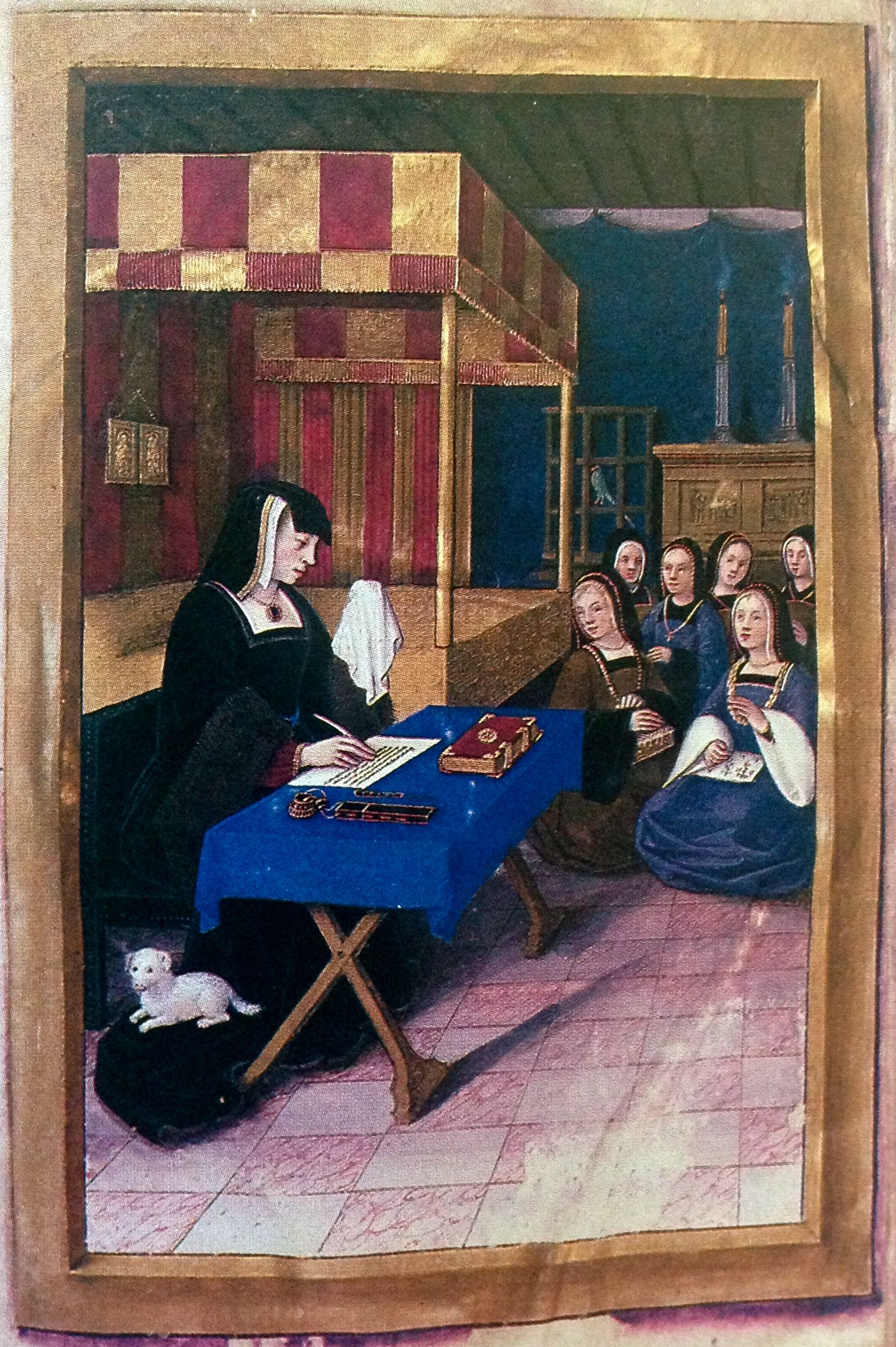
Anne of Brittany writes to her husband Louis XII of France, at a desk supported by two trestles, each with two legs joined by a pinned halved joint. The trestles may be joined beneath the cloth, so as to be wide enough not to tip.

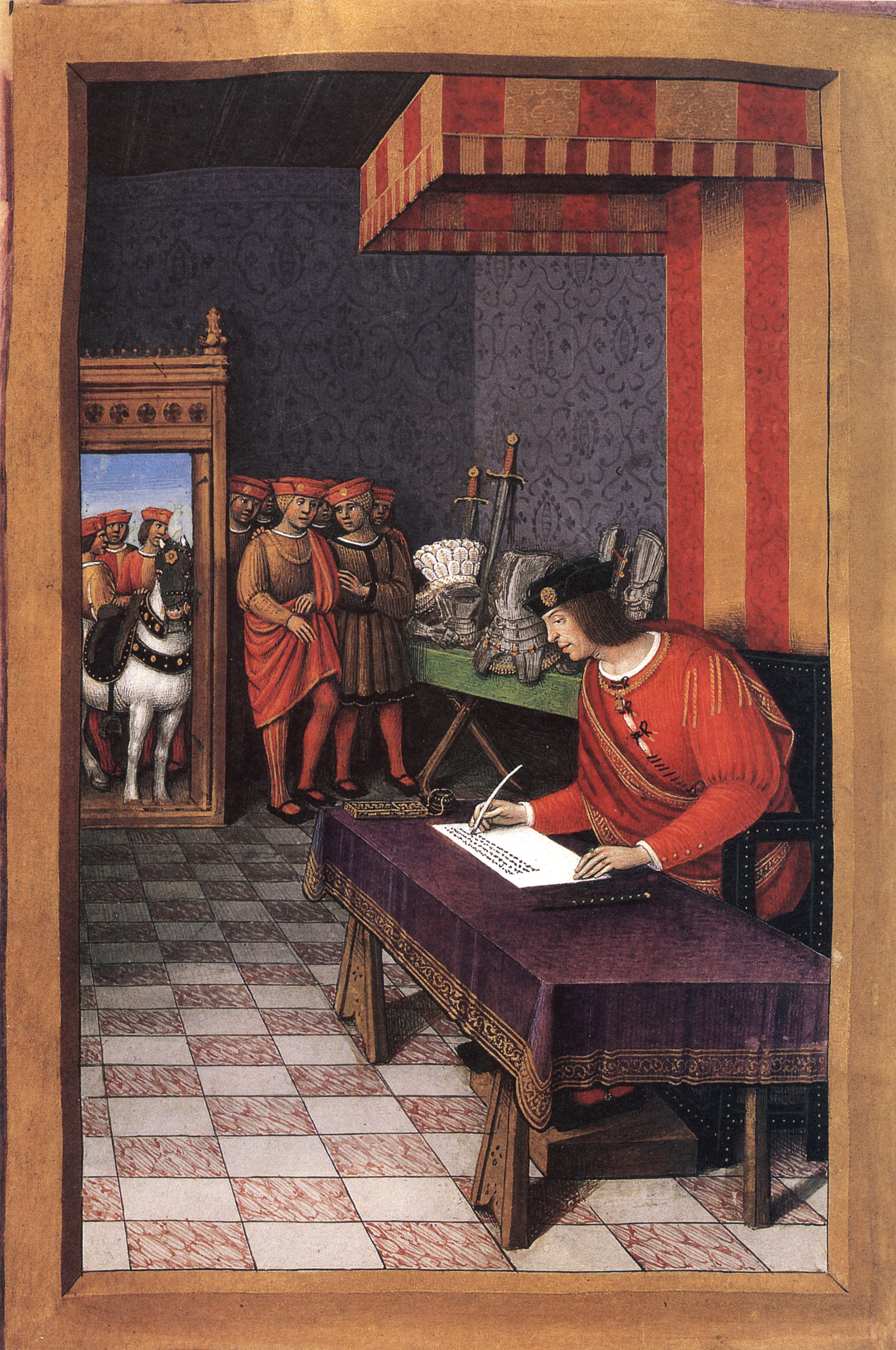
Louis XII of France writes back, from a similar desk, supported by two three-legged trestles, which may be free-standing. Both illustrations early 1500s.

There are two kinds of trestle desk: as with trestle tables, some have trestles joined by one or more stretchers (and sometimes to the desktop), and some have free-standing trestles. They can be dismantled, with the desktop removed from the trestles, for storage or transport.

== Antique trestle desk (linked trestles) ==
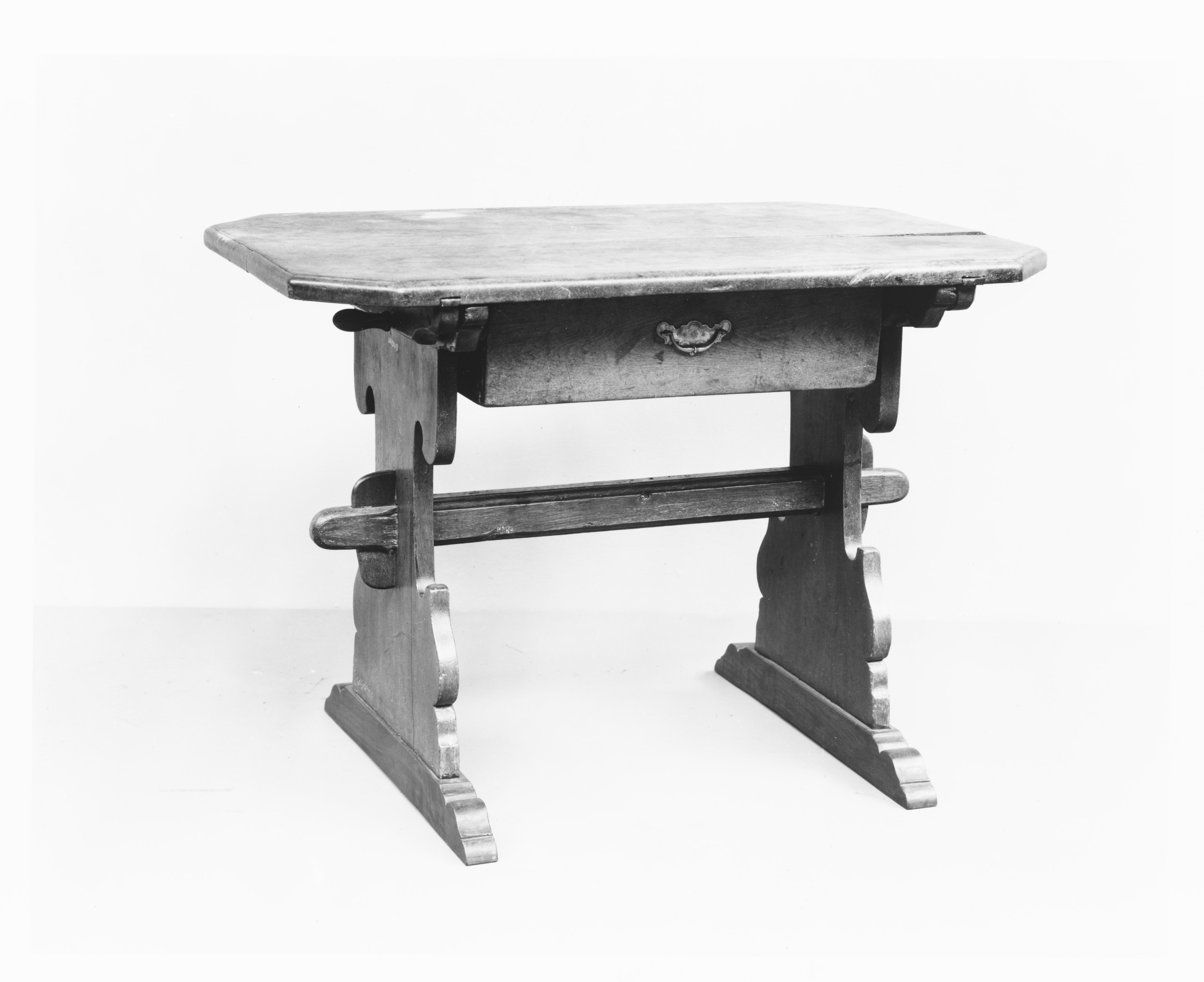
Walnut trestle desk. US, 1740–80

The antique trestle desk has linked trestles. It is usually very much like the writing table desk form, which offers a simple flat desktop surface with a few drawers underneath it. Unlike the writing table the trestle desk is supported by two legs instead of four, and the legs are designed to be dismantled easily in order to store or move the desk efficiently. More precisely, the two legs are two strong side supports which branch out in two feet each (for a total of four) at the bottom. These trestles are fastened together, and sometimes to the desktop, to make a rigid support.

Some antique trestle desks are fitted with small cubbyholes and nooks or small drawers at the extremity of the work surface, and thus resemble a bureau à gradin.

As with most antique desk forms, this trestle desk surface is usually 29 inches (73.7 cm) from the floor (suitable for handwriting).

== Modern trestle desk ==
The modern trestle desk is not so much a desk form as a desk improvisation. In shape and manufacture it sometimes resembles certain variations of the antique field desk which was used by officers not too far from the battlefield. Basically, the modern trestle desk improv is a plank of wood set on two trestles.

It is eminently portable, and eminently practical, when care is taken to provide stable trestles. The advent of the cubicle desk created a market for independent desk elements of all kinds, such as short, rolling filing cabinets. These proved suitable for use under a trestle desk and encouraged improvisation.

In the United States, a desk or a table set on X-shaped trestles is sometimes called a sawbuck table.

See also the list of desk forms and types.
