= Trestle support =

Structural element made of two Λ- or A-shaped frames joined at their apices

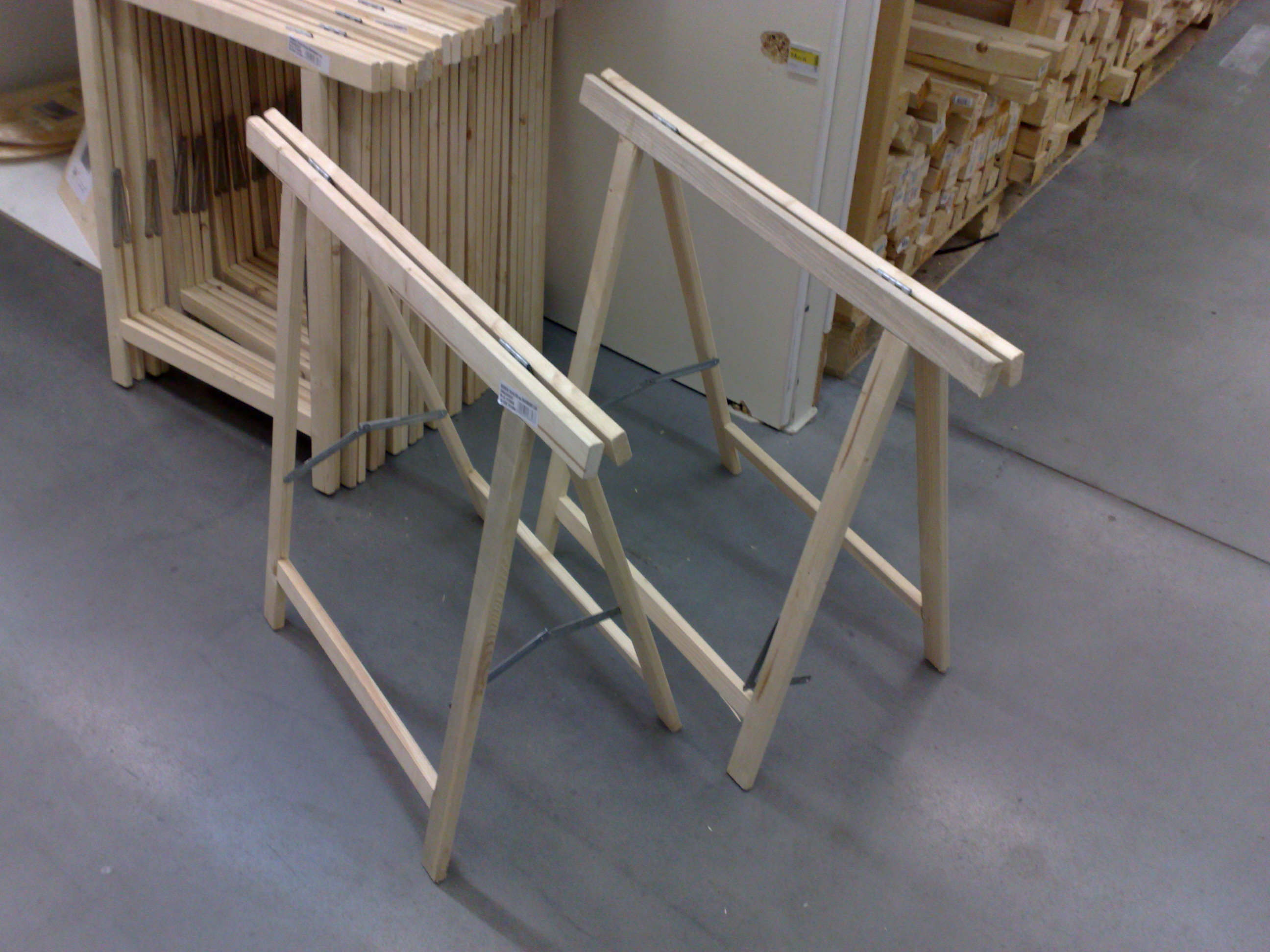
Folding trestles

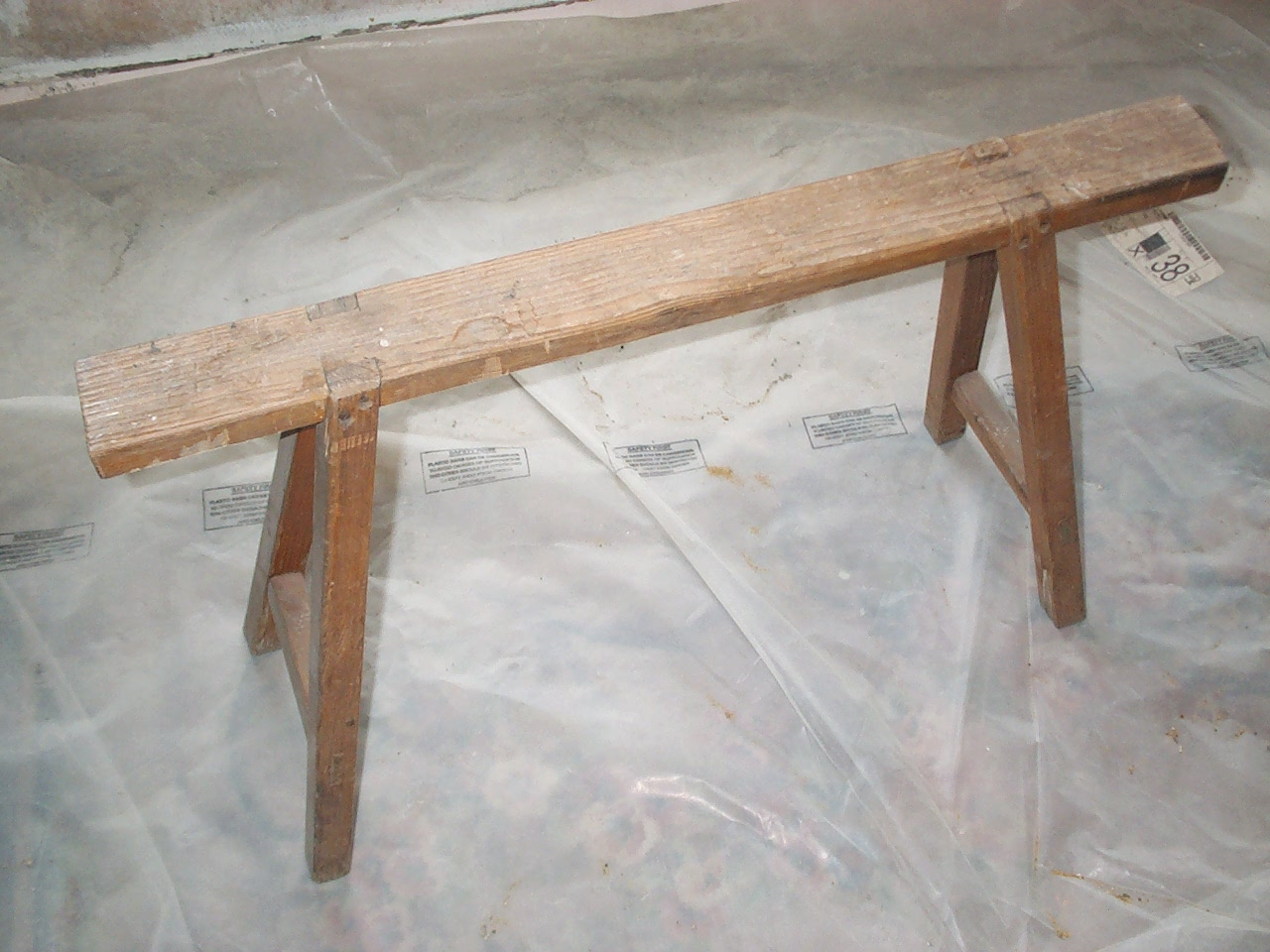
Fixed trestle

In structural engineering, a trestle support (or simply trestle) is a structural element with rigid beams forming the equal sides of two parallel isosceles triangles, joined at their apices by a plank or beam. Sometimes additional rungs are stretched between the two beams. A pair of trestle legs can support one or several boards or planks, forming a trestle table or trestle desk. A network of trestle supports can serve as the framework for a trestle bridge, and a trestle of appropriate size to hold wood for sawing is known as a sawhorse.

== Trestle table ==
A trestle table is a table with trestle legs. In shape and manufacture, it sometimes resembles variations of the antique field desk, which were used by officers close to the battlefield.

Trestle legs come in two kinds:

- Fixed trestle legs, where the angle between the legs is a fixed joint.
- Folding trestle legs, where the angle is hinged, to make them more compact and portable.

In the United States, a table or desk supported by X-shaped trestles is usually called a sawbuck table.

== Trestle bridge ==
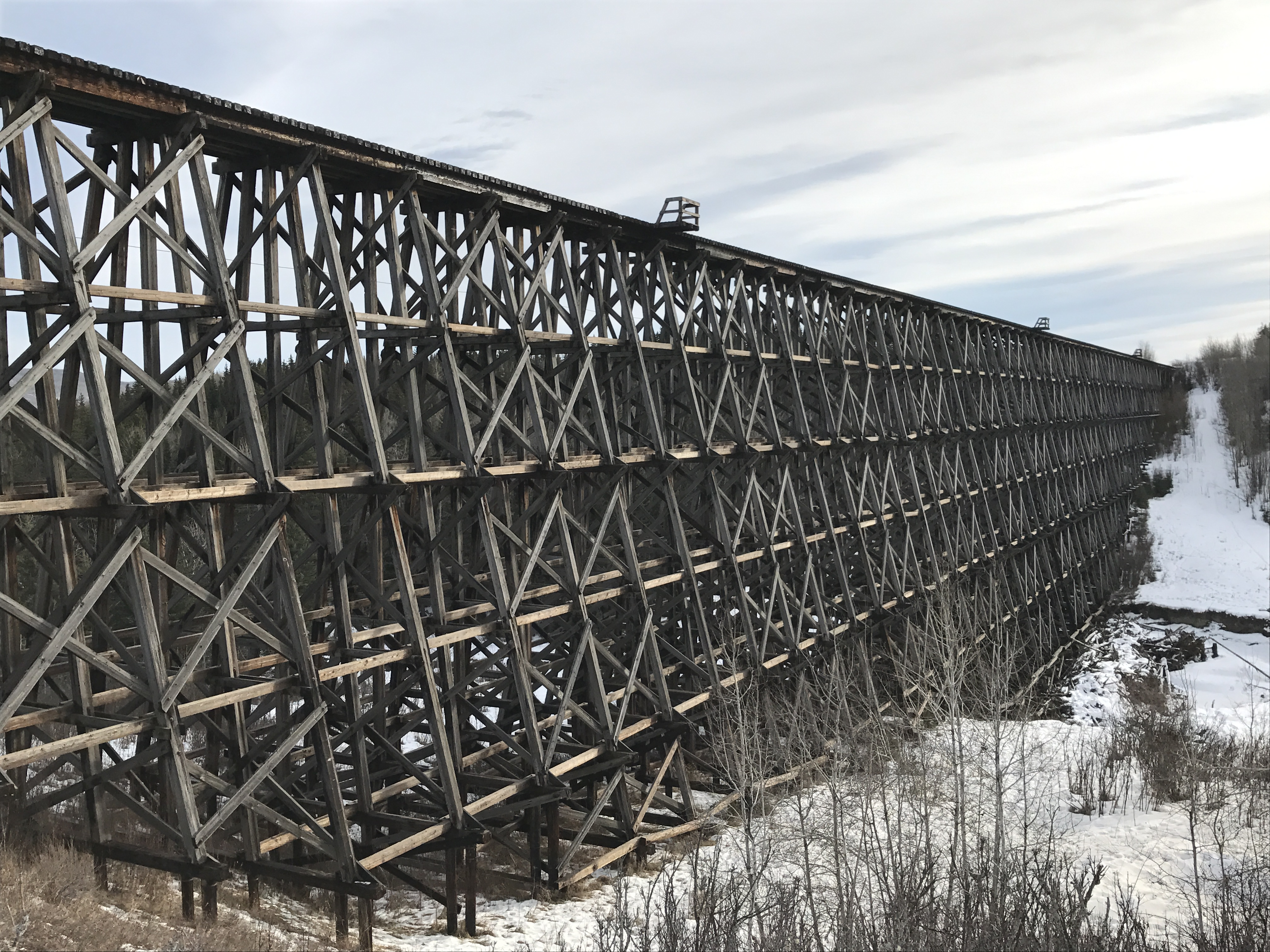
Railway trestle bridge in Dawson Creek, British Columbia

A trestle bridge is composed of a number of short spans supported by closely spaced trestle frames. Each supporting frame is a bent. A trestle differs from a viaduct in that viaducts have towers that support much longer spans and typically have a higher elevation.

Timber and iron trestles (i.e. bridges) were extensively used in the 19th century, particularly for railroads. In the 21st century, steel and sometimes concrete trestles are occasionally used to bridge particularly deep valleys, while timber trestles remain common in certain areas. Timber trestles remain common in some applications, most notably for bridge approaches crossing floodways, where earth fill would dangerously obstruct floodwater.

Many timber trestles were built in the 19th and early 20th centuries with the expectation that they would be temporary. Timber trestles were used to get the railroad to its destination. Once the railroad was running, it was used to transport the material to replace trestles with more permanent works, transporting and dumping fill around some trestles and transporting stone or steel to replace others with more permanent bridges.

== See also ==
- Bent (structural)
- Truss
- Trestle desk
- List of desk forms and types
- Stretcher (furniture)
- Sawhorse
