= Trestle table =

Table made from two linked A- or X-shaped supports

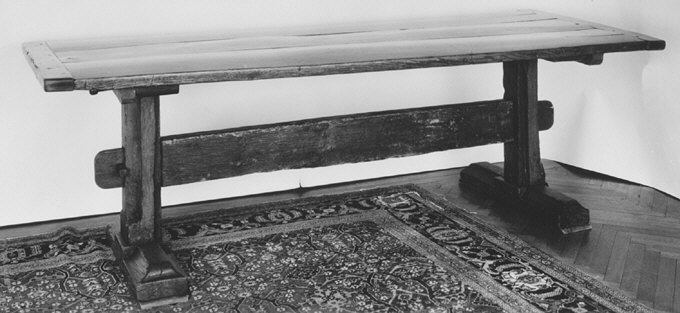
English trestle table, 16th century. Trestles are joined at the stretcher and tabletop.

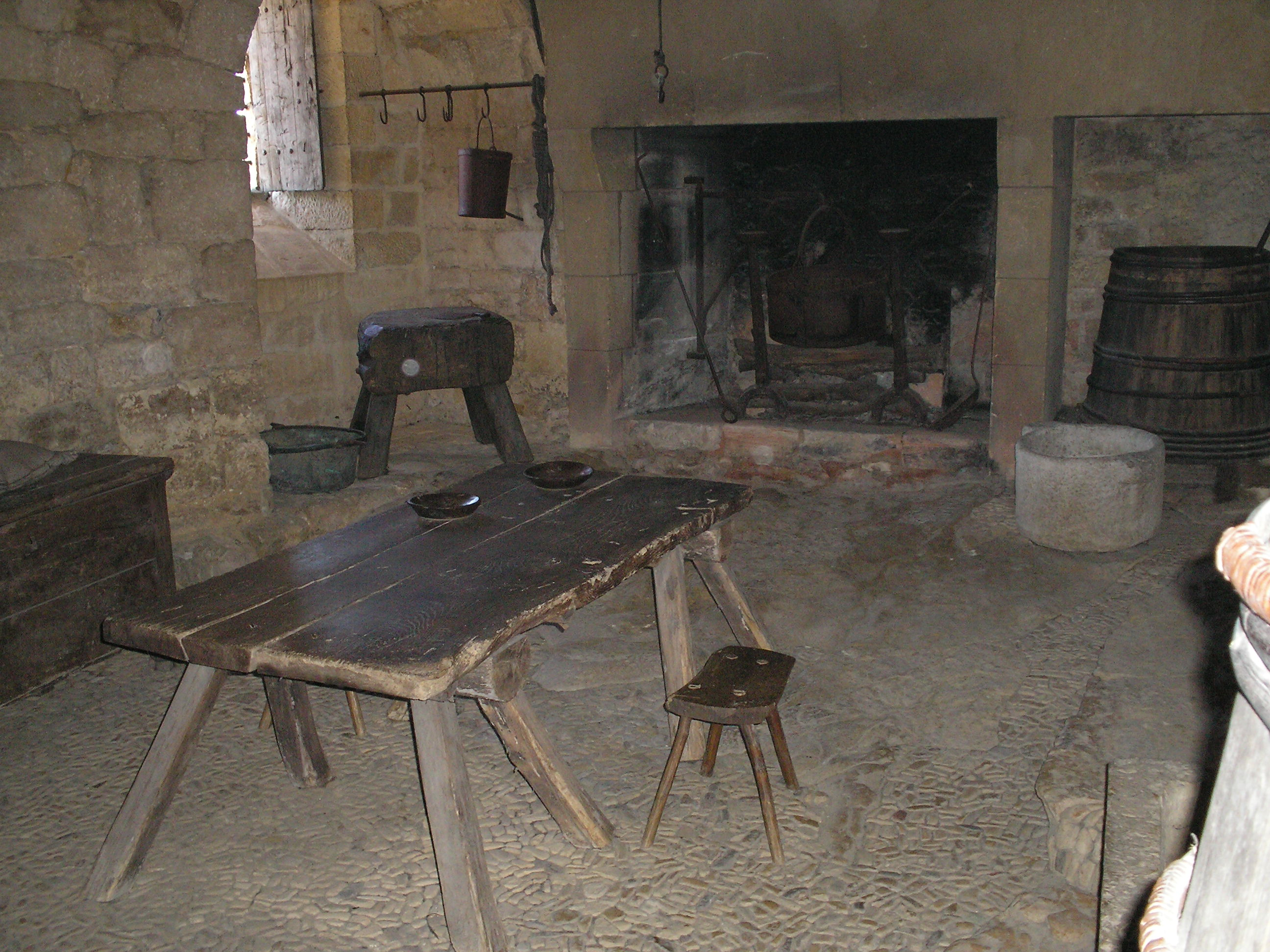
Table with two free-standing four-legged trestles. Château de Beynac, France.

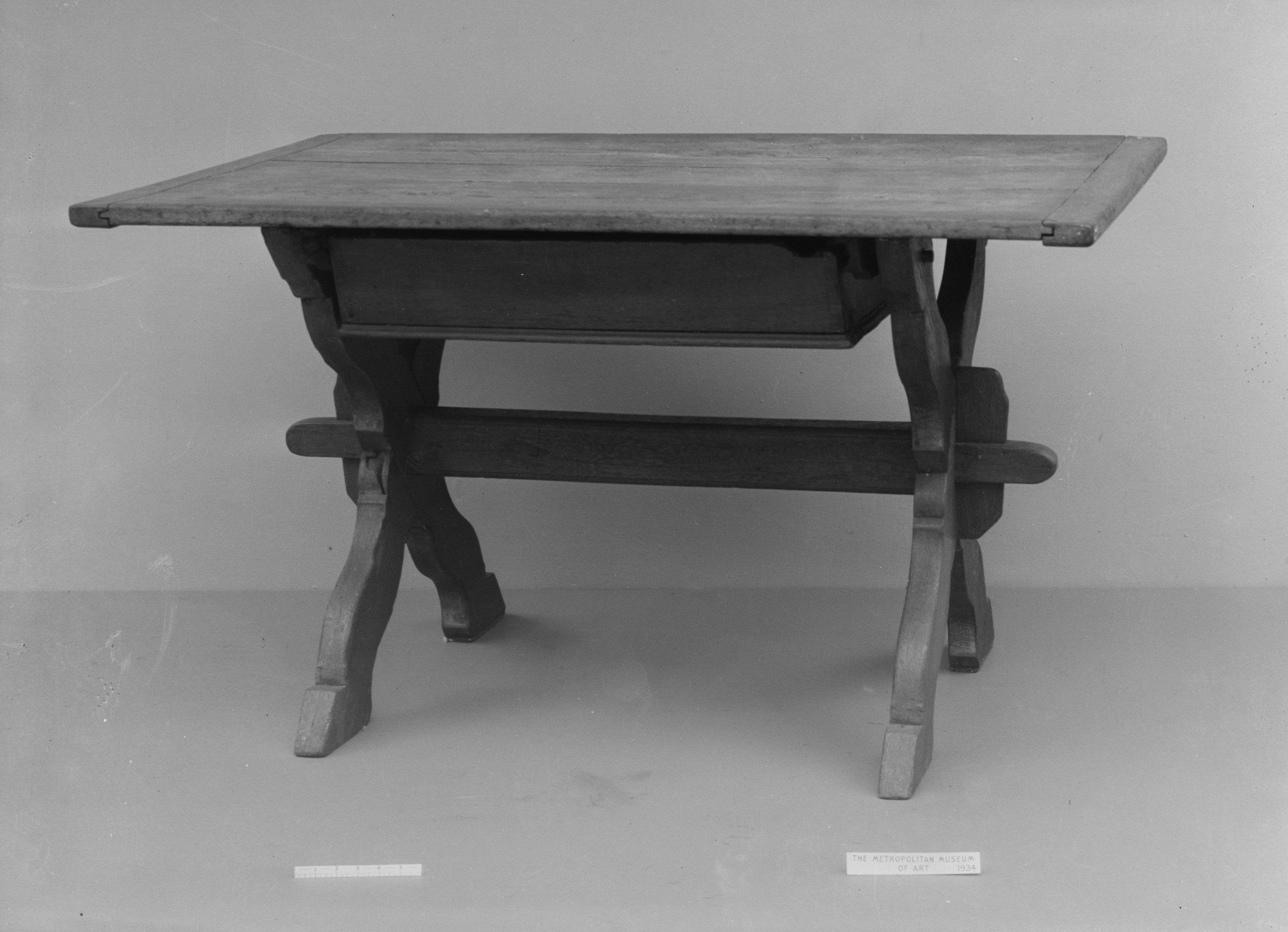
American trestle table, 18th century

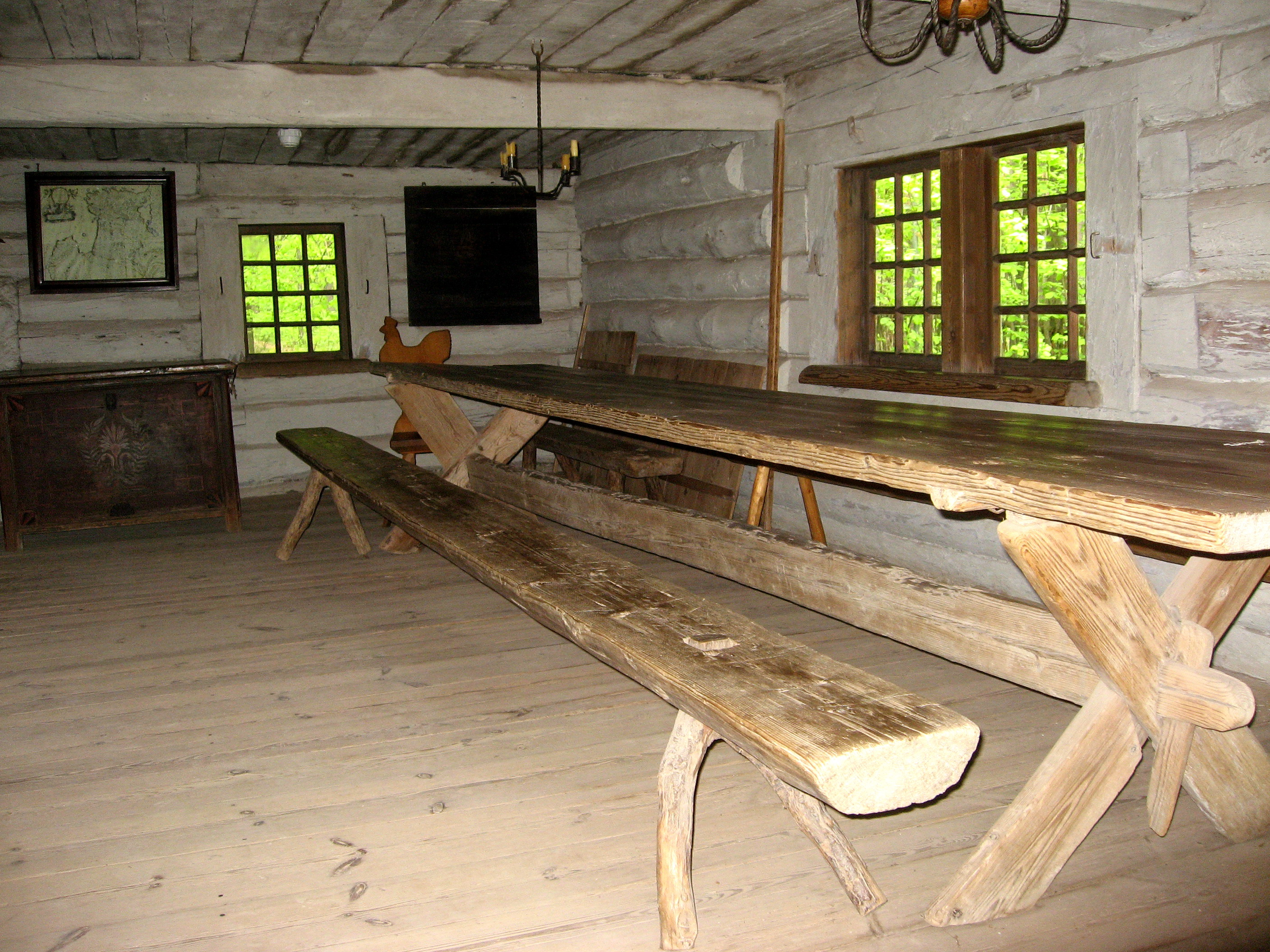
Trestle table at the Ethnographic Open-Air Museum of Latvia

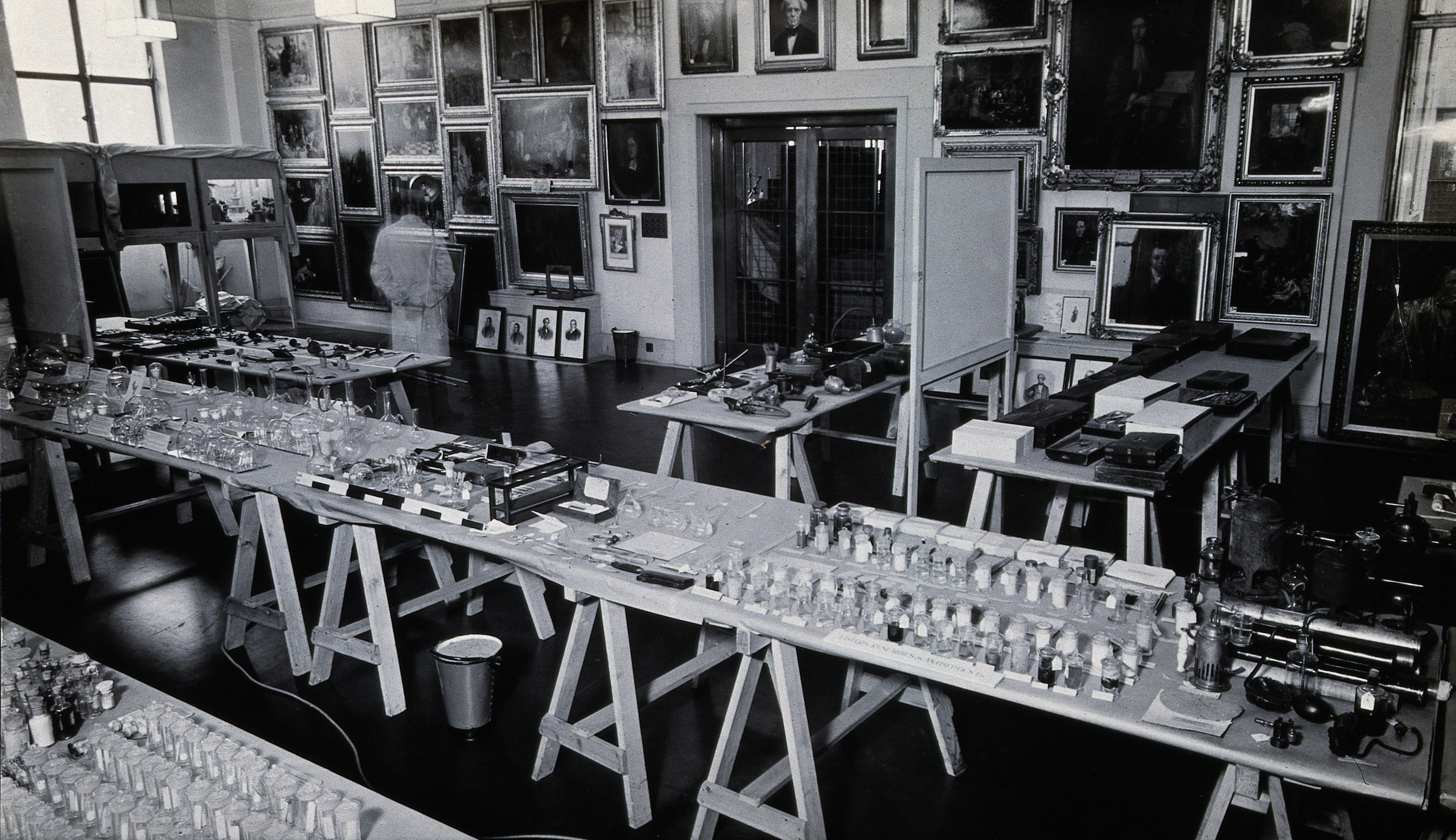
Trestle tables with free-standing trestles in the c.1955 microbiology lab of Joseph Lister.

In woodworking, a trestle table is a table consisting of two or three trestle supports, often linked by a stretcher (longitudinal cross-member), over which a board or tabletop is placed. In the Middle Ages, the trestle table was often little more than loose boards over trestle legs for ease of assembly and storage. This simple, collapsible style remained the most common Western form of table until the 16th century, when the basic trestle design gave way to stronger frame-based structures such as gateleg and refectory tables. Ease of assembly and storage has made it the ideal occasional table, and it remains a popular form of dining table, as those seated are not so inconvenienced as they might be with the more usual arrangement of a fixed leg at each corner.

== Construction and uses ==
Trestle tables figure prominently in the traditional American style of household furnishings, usually accompanied by spindle-backed chairs. The trestles in this case are normally of much higher quality, often made of oak and braced with a stretcher beam using a keyed tenon through the centre of each trestle. These typically support a high-quality waxed oak tabletop. Trestle tables are also used in the event furniture industry, they are the main table used at weddings and other types of venues today.

== Heraldry ==
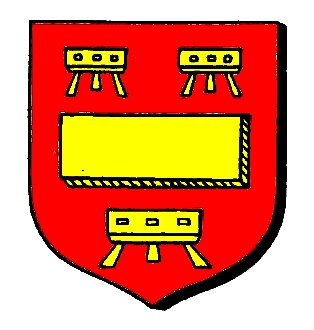
Trestles in the medieval House of Stratford coat of arms

The trestle (also tressle, tressel and threstle) is (rarely) used as a charge in heraldry. It is symbolically associated with hospitality (as historically the trestle was a tripod used both as a stool and to support tables at banquets).

== See also ==
- Picnic table
- Refectory table
- Sawbuck table
- Table (furniture)
- Trestle desk
