= Stretcher (furniture) =

Horizontal support element of an item of furniture

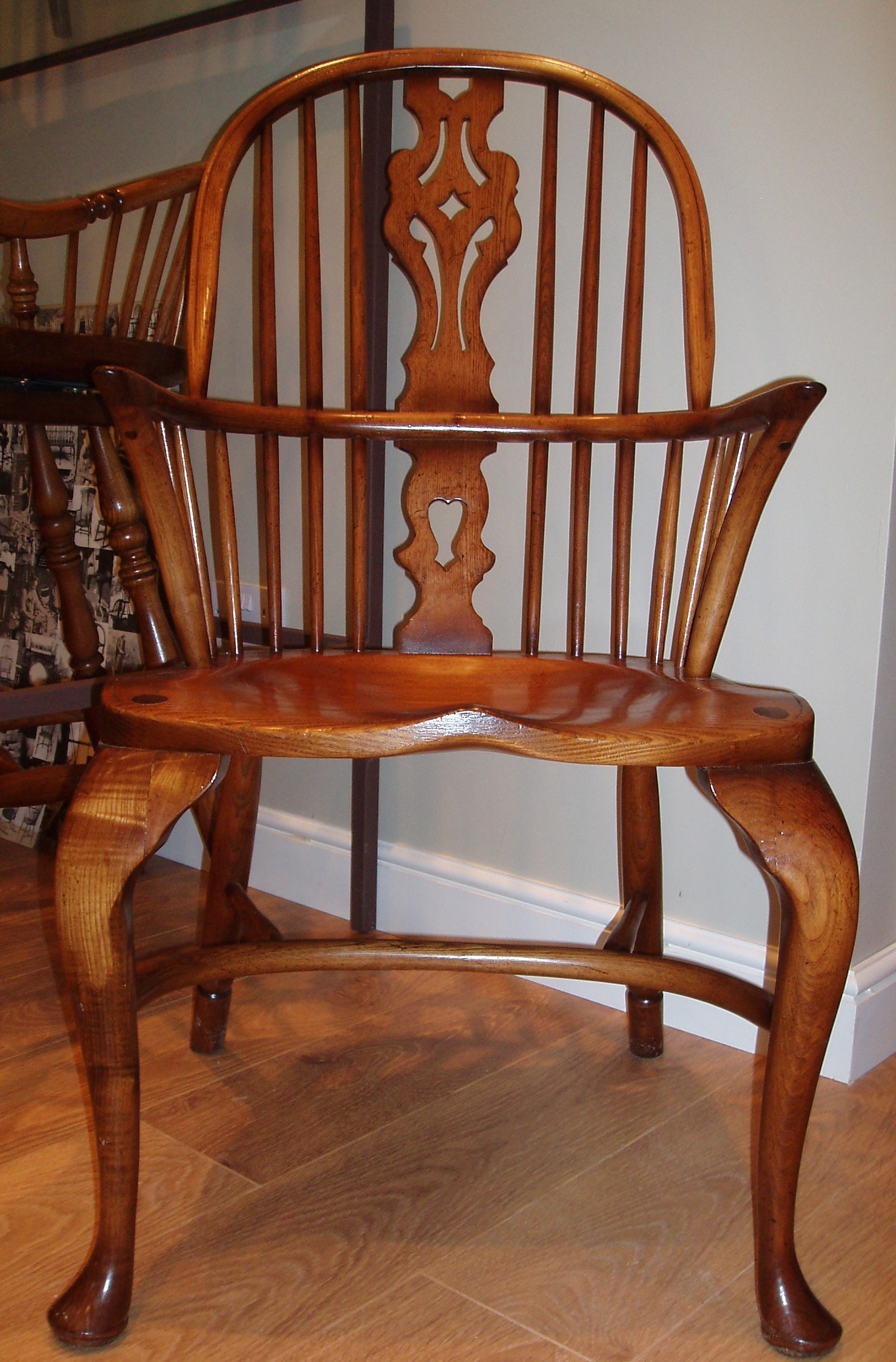
A Windsor Georgian double bow with cabriole legs

A stretcher is a horizontal support element of a table, chair or other item of furniture; this structure is normally made of exposed wood and ties vertical elements of the piece together. There are numerous styles of the stretcher including circumferential, double and spindle design. This term is sometimes referred to as a stretcher beam. A very common pattern for chairs has each front leg connected to the back by the lateral stretchers, which in turn are connected by a medial stretcher. In the William and Mary period chi (from the Greek letter chi - Χ) stretchers were common, connecting the legs diagonally, frequently with a finial where the stretchers crossed.

== See also ==
- Gateleg table
- Hayrake table
- Refectory table
- Palisander chair
- Trestle support
