= Poker table =

Table designed for card games

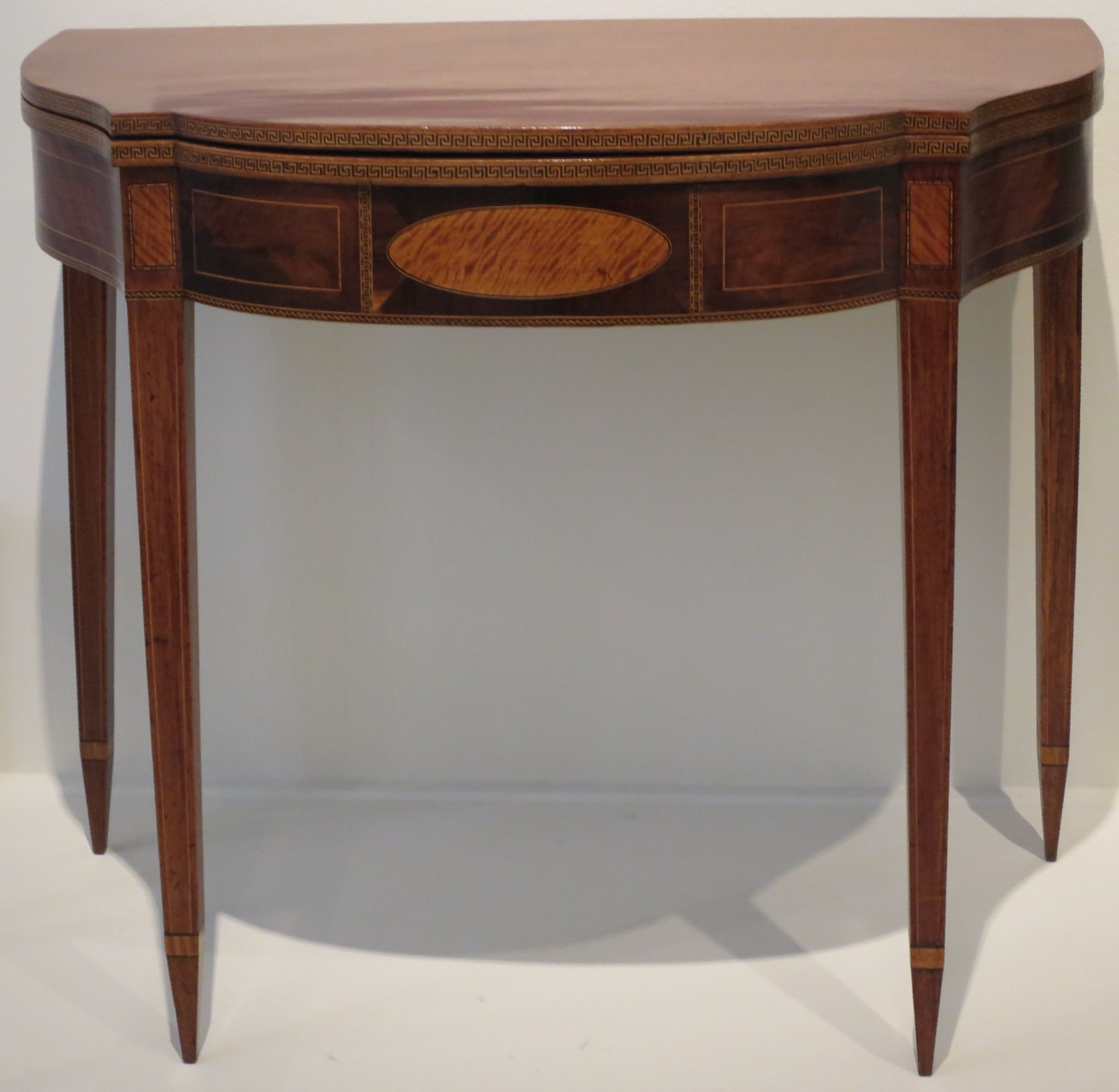
A card table made about 1800 by New Englander Elisha Tucker.

A poker table or card table is a table specifically designed for playing card games.

== Traditional card tables ==
The card table arose around 1700 as card games became wildly popular in Europe. The manufacture of card tables as fine home furniture lasted to the middle of the 1800s. Card tables made in this era often had a folding top, which enabled them to serve as pier tables, console tables, or end tables when not in use. Styles ranged from simple to elaborate, with higher-end card tables featuring inlaid wood or stone, extensive delicate carvings, and expensive veneers. Some even had indentations carved into the playing surface to hold playing tokens, and slots around the rim which served as candle-holders. Semicircular (or "D" or "half-round") tables 36 inches (91 cm) in diameter (when opened) were the most popular card table in both North America and Europe.

Former President Harry Truman sitting at a poker table in 1956.

Typical American card tables from the late colonial and early American periods feature simple, straight lines, an ovolo corner, and square-tapered legs. Furniture makers in New York often created card tables with a fifth leg (to support the opened top) hinged to the rear of the table, long reeded legs with swelled feet that end in cylinders, and veneered sides and crossbanded edges around the leaves and table.

== Modern poker tables ==
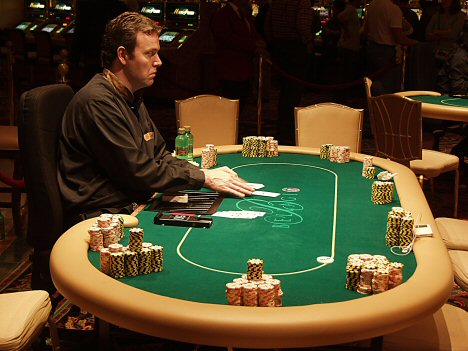
Poker table at the 2004 World Poker Tour at the Bellagio hotel and casino in Las Vegas.

The modern poker table is a form of card table which is often covered with baize (a type of felt) or speed cloth (a Teflon-coated fabric) to help the cards slide easily across the surface. It is either an actual table or a fold-out tabletop surface. Those used in professional televised poker feature "pocketcams" which can view a player's pocket, or hole cards. Such tables are usually fairly oval-shaped, with the players sitting around a curve of the table with a dealer facing them in an indented area of the table made specifically for the dealer. In amateur poker, tables are often oval, round or octagonal, using a rotating dealer position. The edge of the table is usually padded and raised slightly for the players to rest their arms, and this section is called the "rail". There is often a section of wood between the rail and the playing surface; this is called the "race track" and often features cup holders as well. The center of the table often features an image, usually the name or logo of the casino or house where the game is being played.

== Bibliography ==
- Landon, Eugene E. (1991). "Making a Hepplewhite Card Table". In Burrows, Dick (ed.). The Best of Fine Woodworking: Traditional Furniture Projects. Newtown, Conn.: Taunton Press. ISBN 9780942391930.
- Taylor, Lonn; Warren, David B. (2012). Texas Furniture: The Cabinetmakers and Their Work, 1840-1880. Austin, Tex.: University of Texas Press. ISBN 9780292739420.
- Zimmerman, Philip D.; Butler, Tom; Hutchins, Catherine E. (2004). American Federal Furniture and Decorative Arts from the Watson Collection. Columbus, Ga.: Columbus Museum. ISBN 9781882650170.

== See also ==
- Shoe (cards)
