= Table (furniture) =

Piece of furniture with a flat top

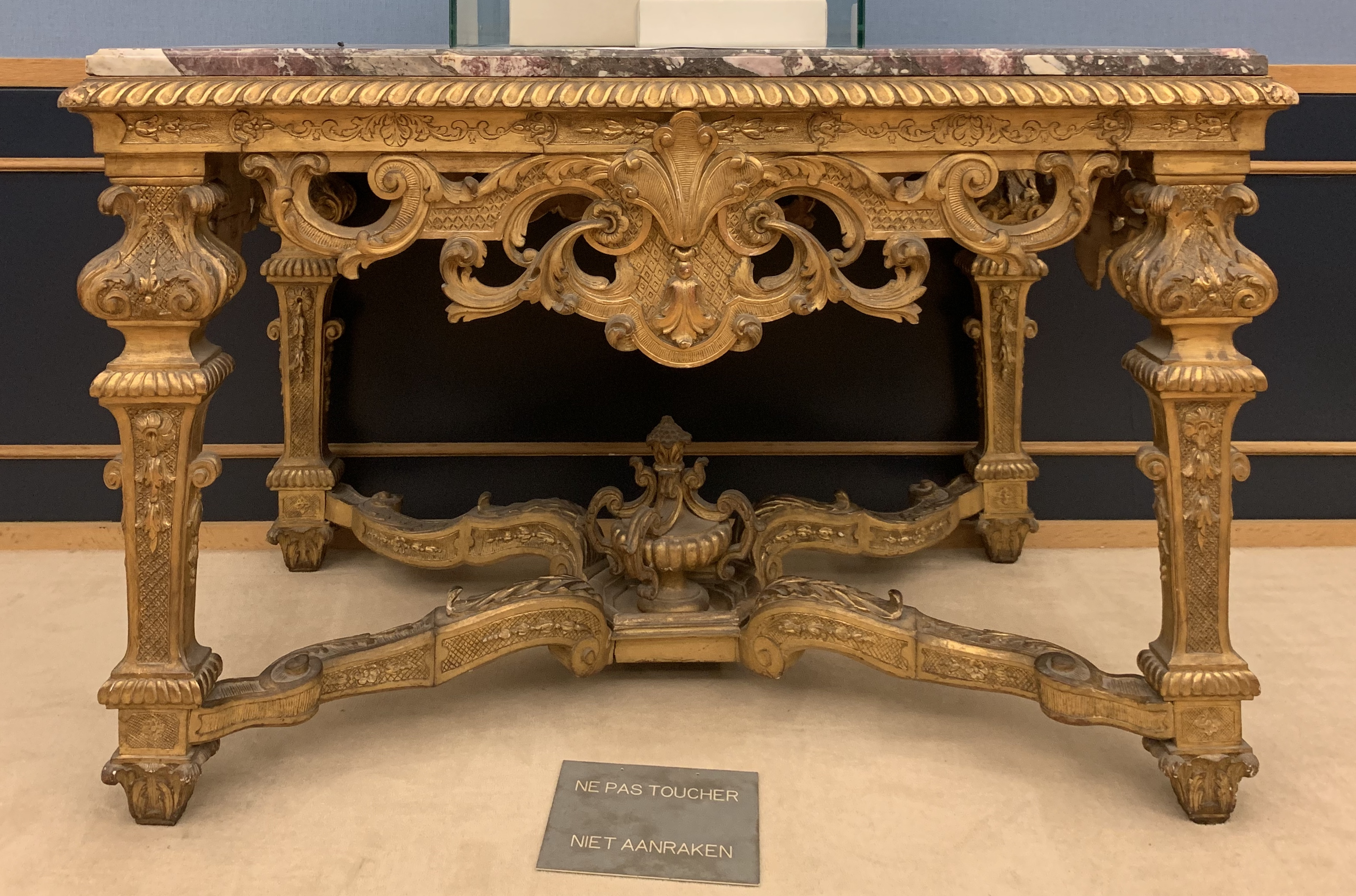
A gilded Baroque table, with a stone top (most probably marble), from the Cinquantenaire Museum (Brussels, Belgium)

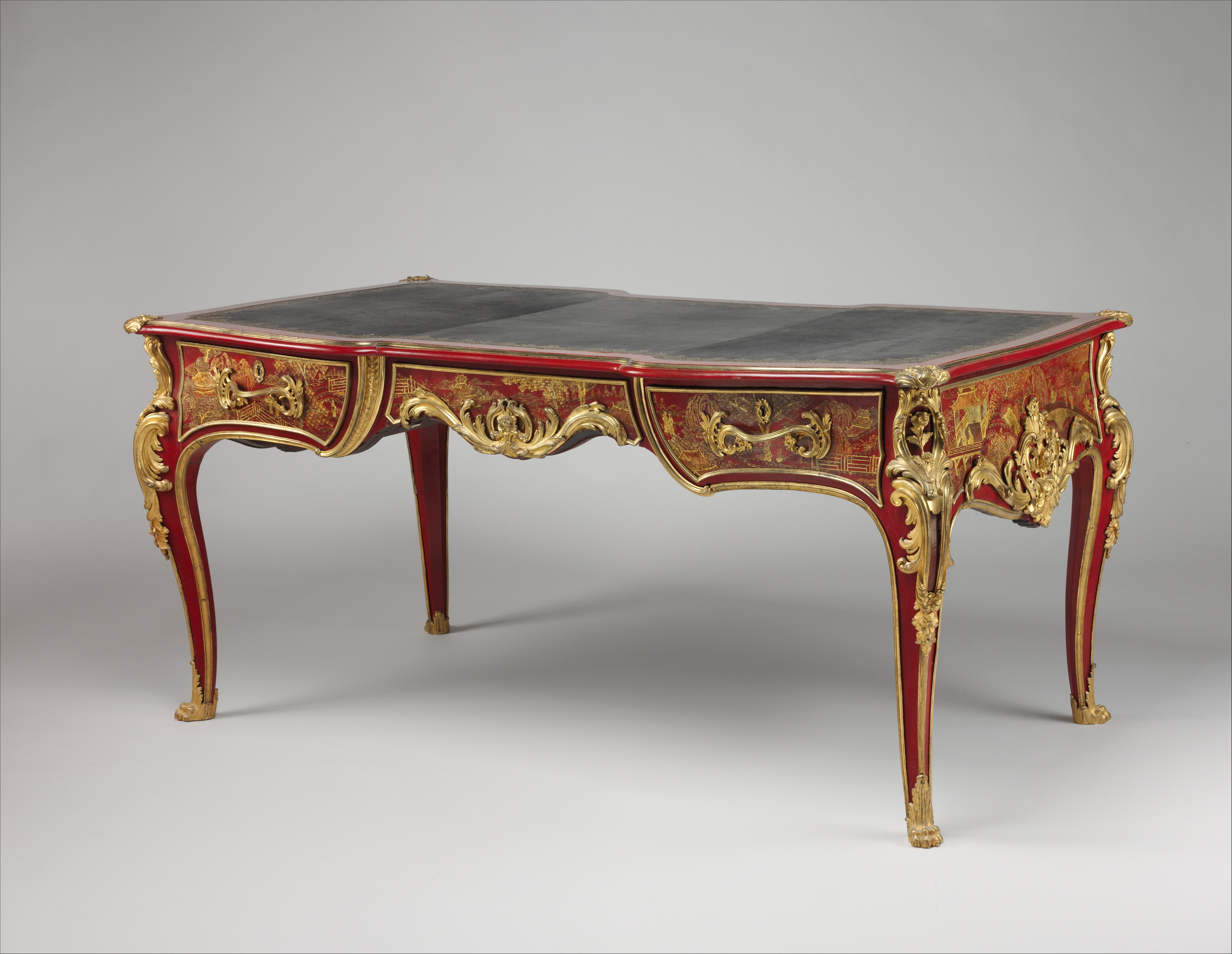
Rococo writing table; 1759; lacquered oak, gilt-bronze mounts and lined with modern leather; height: 80.6 cm, width: 175.9 cm; Metropolitan Museum of Art (New York City)

A table is a piece of furniture with a raised flat top and is supported most commonly by 1 to 4 legs (although some can have more). It is used as a surface for working, eating or placing things. Some common types of tables are the dining room tables, which are used for seated persons to eat meals; the coffee table, which is a low table used in living rooms to display items or serve refreshments; and the bedside table, which is commonly used to place an alarm clock and a lamp. There are also a range of specialized types of tables, such as drafting tables, used for doing architectural drawings, and sewing tables.

Common design elements include:

- Top surfaces of various shapes, including rectangular, square, rounded, semi-circular or oval
- Legs arranged in two or more similar pairs. It usually has four legs. However, some tables have three legs, use a single heavy pedestal, or are attached to a wall.
- Several geometries of folding table that can be collapsed into a smaller volume (e.g., a TV tray, which is a portable, folding table on a stand)
- Heights ranging up and down from the most common 18–30 inches (46–76 cm) range, often reflecting the height of chairs or bar stools used as seating for people making use of a table, as for eating or performing various manipulations of objects resting on a table
- A huge range of sizes, from small bedside tables to large dining room tables and huge conference room tables
- Presence or absence of drawers, shelves or other areas for storing items
- Expansion of the table surface by insertion of leaves or locking hinged drop leaf sections into a horizontal position (this is particularly common for dining tables)

== Etymology ==
The word table is derived from Old English tabele, derived from the Latin word tabula ('a board, plank, flat top piece'), which replaced the Old English bord; its current spelling reflects the influence of the French table.

== History ==
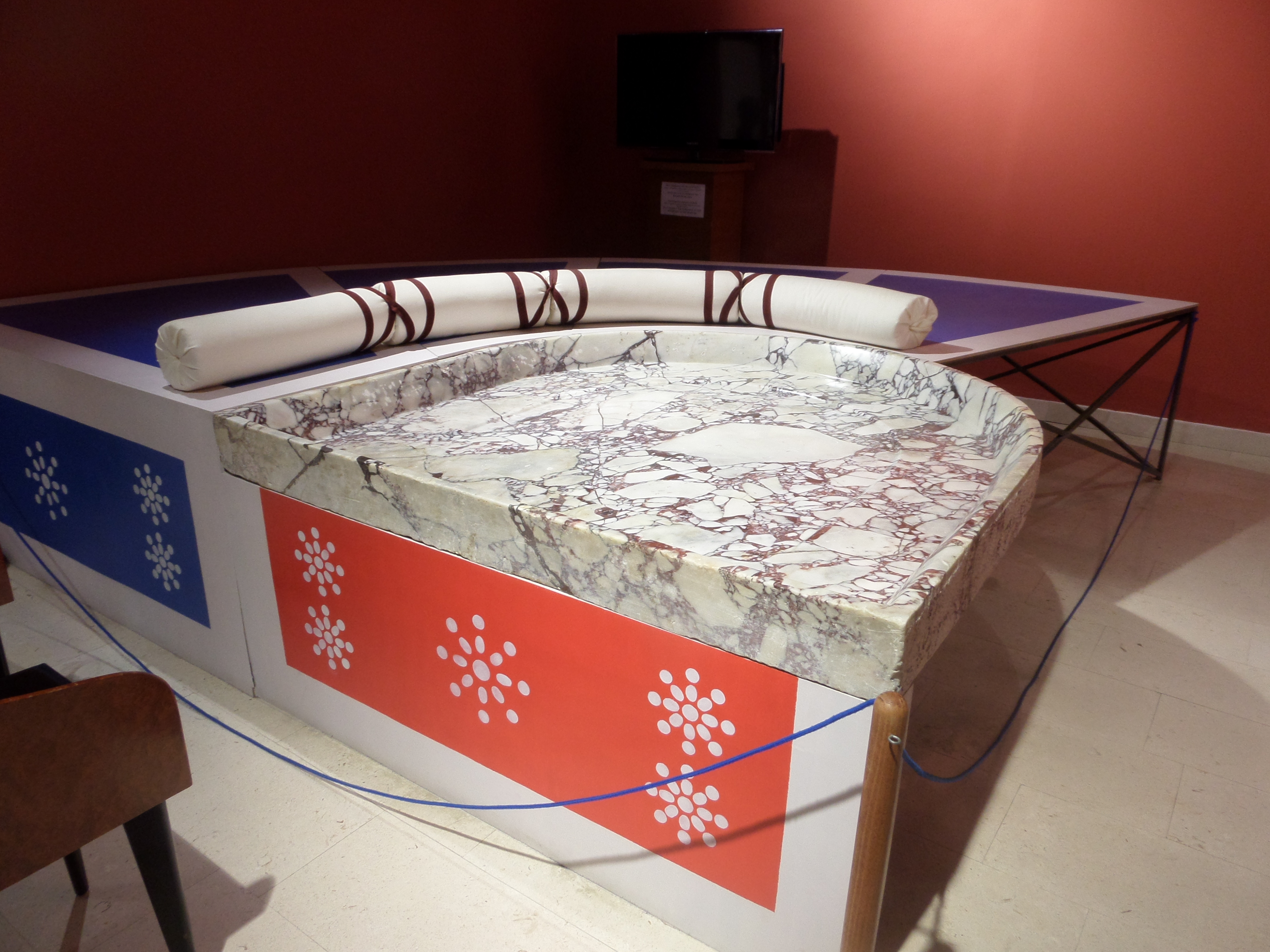
Roman dining table: mensa lunata

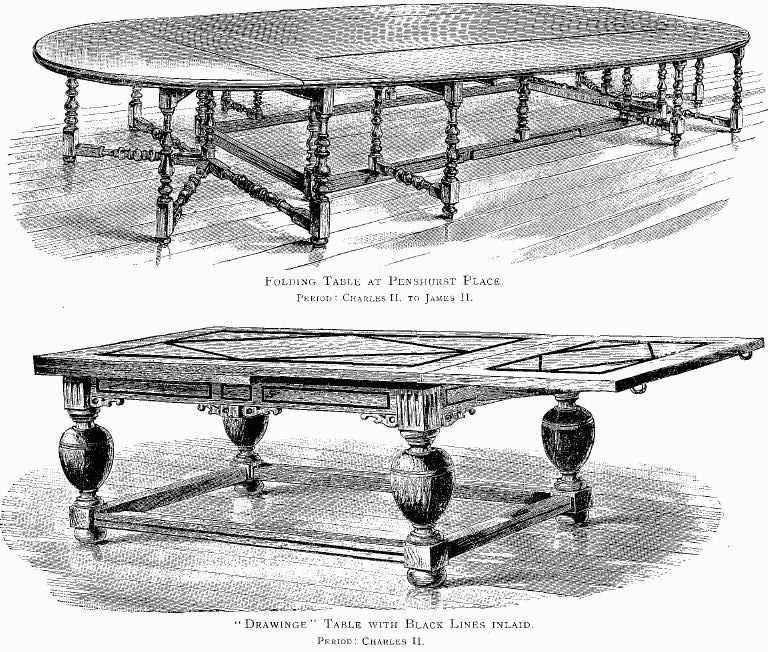
Large 17th-century English folding tables

Some very early tables were made and used by the Ancient Egyptians around 2500 BC, using wood and alabaster. They were often little more than stone platforms used to keep objects off the floor, though a few examples of wooden tables have been found in tombs. Food and drinks were usually put on large plates deposed on a pedestal for eating. The Egyptians made use of various small tables and elevated playing boards. The Chinese also created very early tables in order to pursue the arts of writing and painting, as did people in Mesopotamia, where various metals were used.

The Greeks and Romans made more frequent use of tables, notably for eating, although Greek tables were pushed under a bed after use. The Greeks invented a piece of furniture very similar to the guéridon. Tables were made of marble or wood and metal (typically bronze or silver alloys), sometimes with richly ornate legs. Later, the larger rectangular tables were made of separate platforms and pillars. The Romans also introduced a large, semicircular table to Italy, the mensa lunata. Plutarch mentions use of "tables" by Persians.

Furniture during the Middle Ages is not as well known as that of earlier or later periods, and most sources show the types used by the nobility. In the Eastern Roman Empire, tables were made of metal or wood, usually with four feet and frequently linked by x-shaped stretchers. Tables for eating were large and often round or semicircular. A combination of a small round table and a lectern seemed very popular as a writing table.

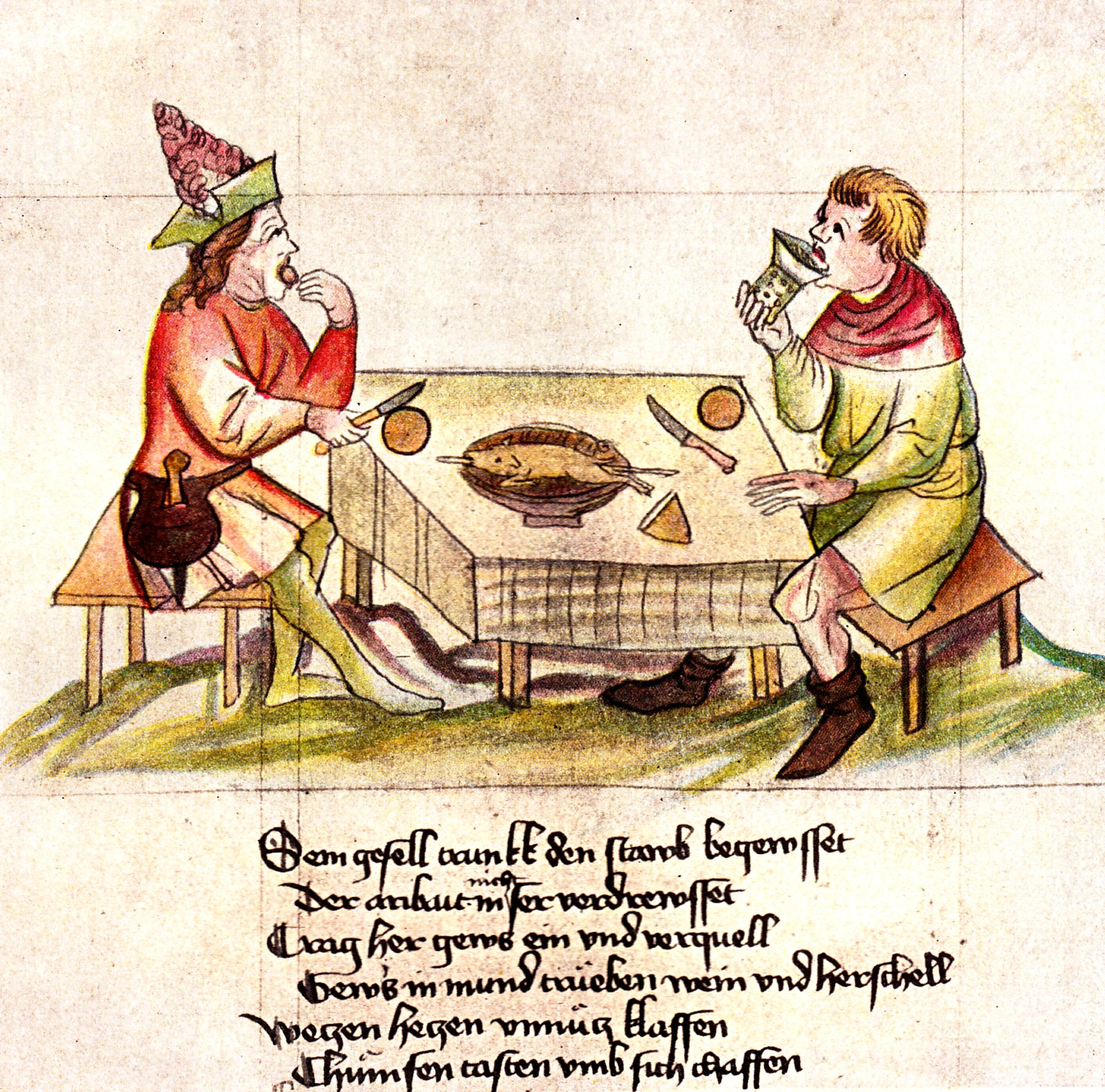
A dining scene in medieval Germany

In western Europe, although there was variety of form—the circular, semicircular, oval and oblong were all in use—tables appear to have been portable and supported upon trestles fixed or folding, which were cleared out of the way at the end of a meal. Thus Charlemagne possessed three tables of silver and one of gold, probably made of wood and covered with plates of the precious metals. The custom of serving dinner at several small tables, which is often supposed to be a modern refinement, was followed in the French châteaux, and probably also in the English castles, as early as the 13th century.

Refectory tables first appeared at least as early as the 17th century, as an advancement of the trestle table; these tables were typically quite long and wide and capable of supporting a sizeable banquet in the great hall or other reception room of a castle.

== Shape, height, and function ==
Tables come in a wide variety of materials, shapes, and heights dependent upon their origin, style, intended use and cost. Many tables are made of wood or wood-based products; some are made of other materials including metal and glass. Most tables are composed of a flat surface and one or more supports (legs). A table with a single, central foot is a pedestal table. Long tables often have extra legs for support.

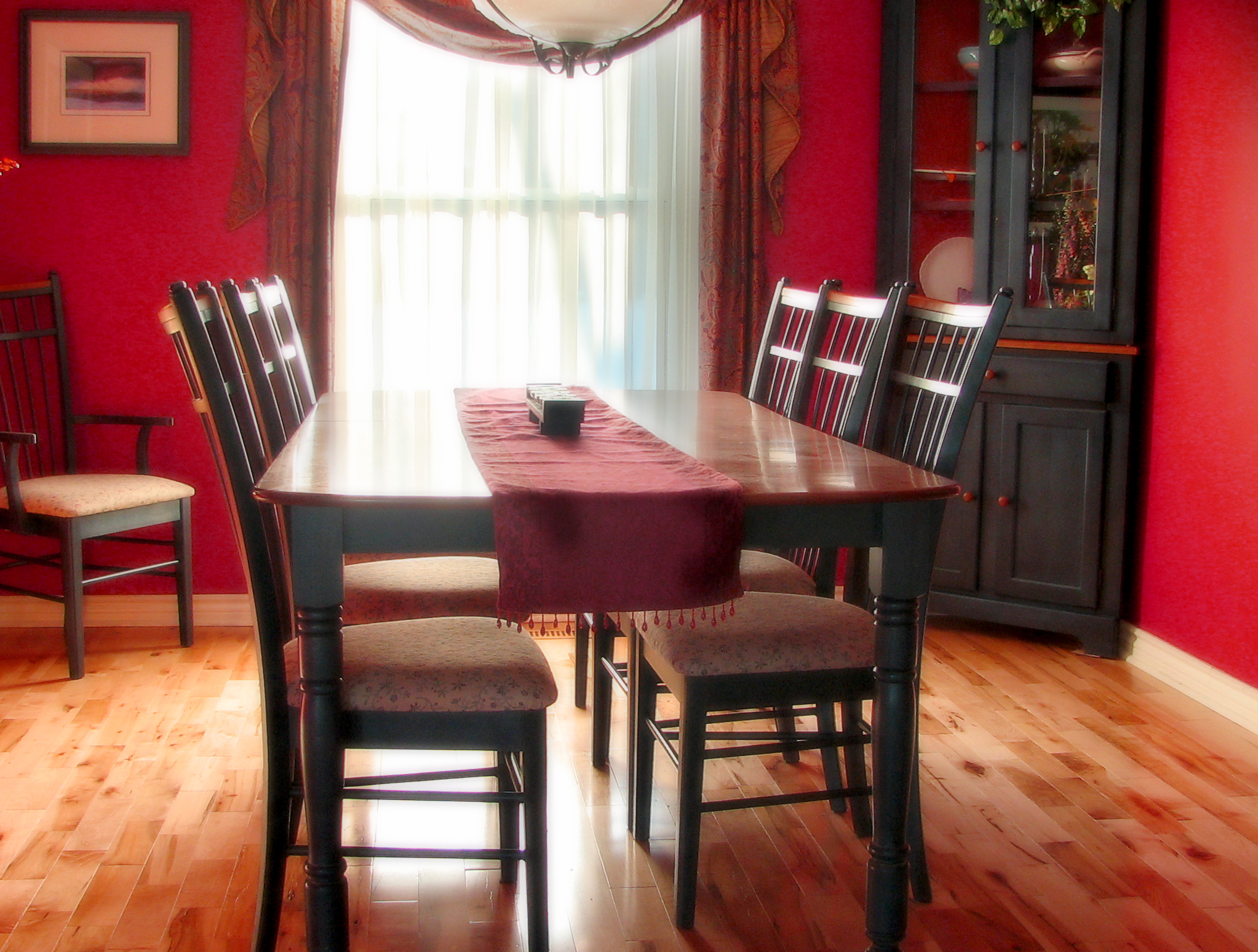
Dinner table and chairs

Table tops can be in virtually any shape, although rectangular, square, round (e.g. the round table), and oval tops are the most frequent. Others have higher surfaces for personal use while either standing or sitting on a tall stool.

Many tables have tops that can be adjusted to change their height, position, shape, or size, either with foldable, sliding or extensions parts that can alter the shape of the top. Some tables are entirely foldable for easy transportation, e.g. camping or storage, e.g., TV trays. Small tables in trains and aircraft may be fixed or foldable, although they are sometimes considered as simply convenient shelves rather than tables.

Tables can be freestanding or designed for placement against a wall. Tables designed to be placed against a wall are known as pier tables or console tables (French: console, "support bracket") and may be bracket-mounted (traditionally), like a shelf, or have legs, which sometimes imitate the look of a bracket-mounted table.

== Types ==
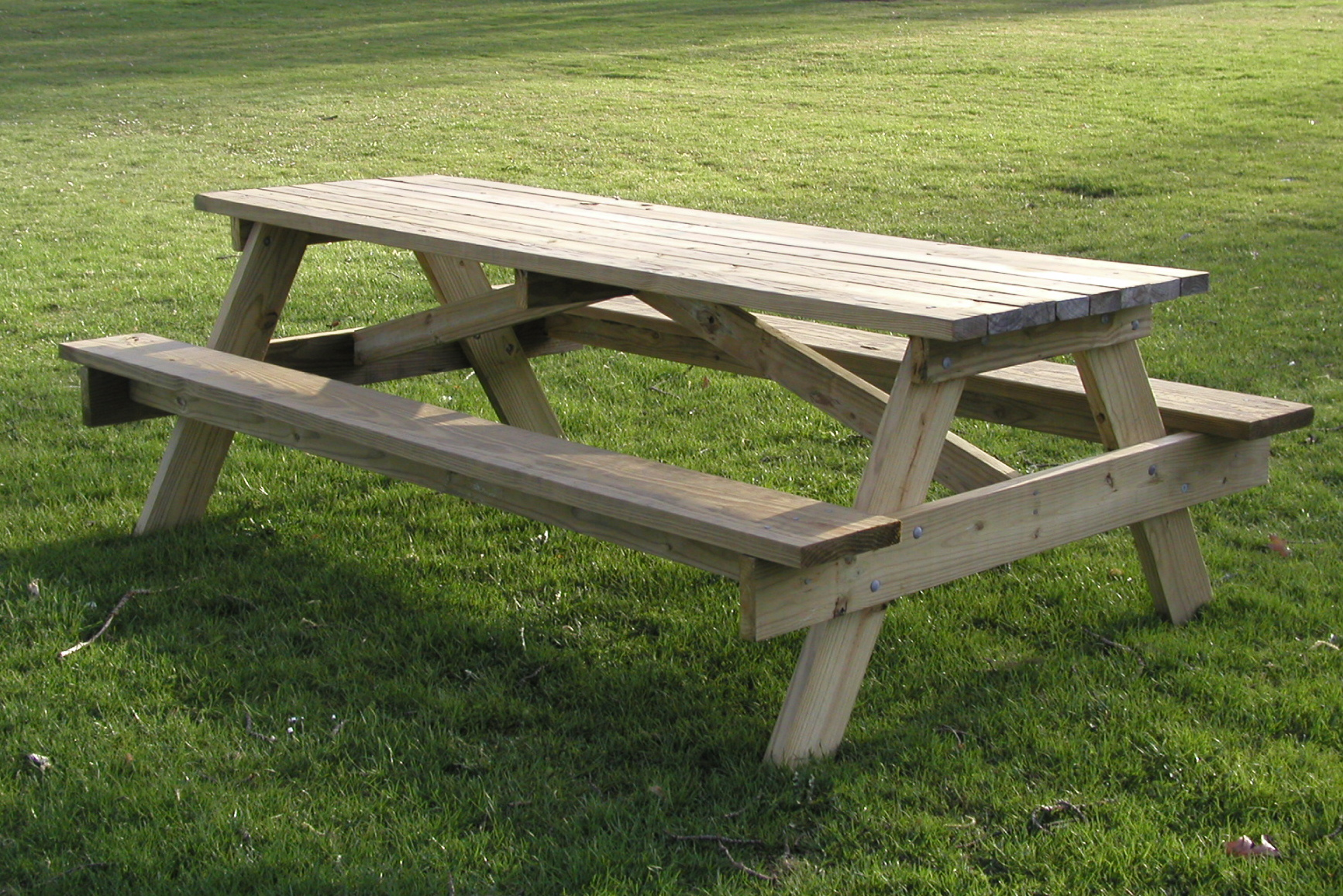
A combination of a table with two benches (picnic table) as often seen at camping sites and other outdoor facilities

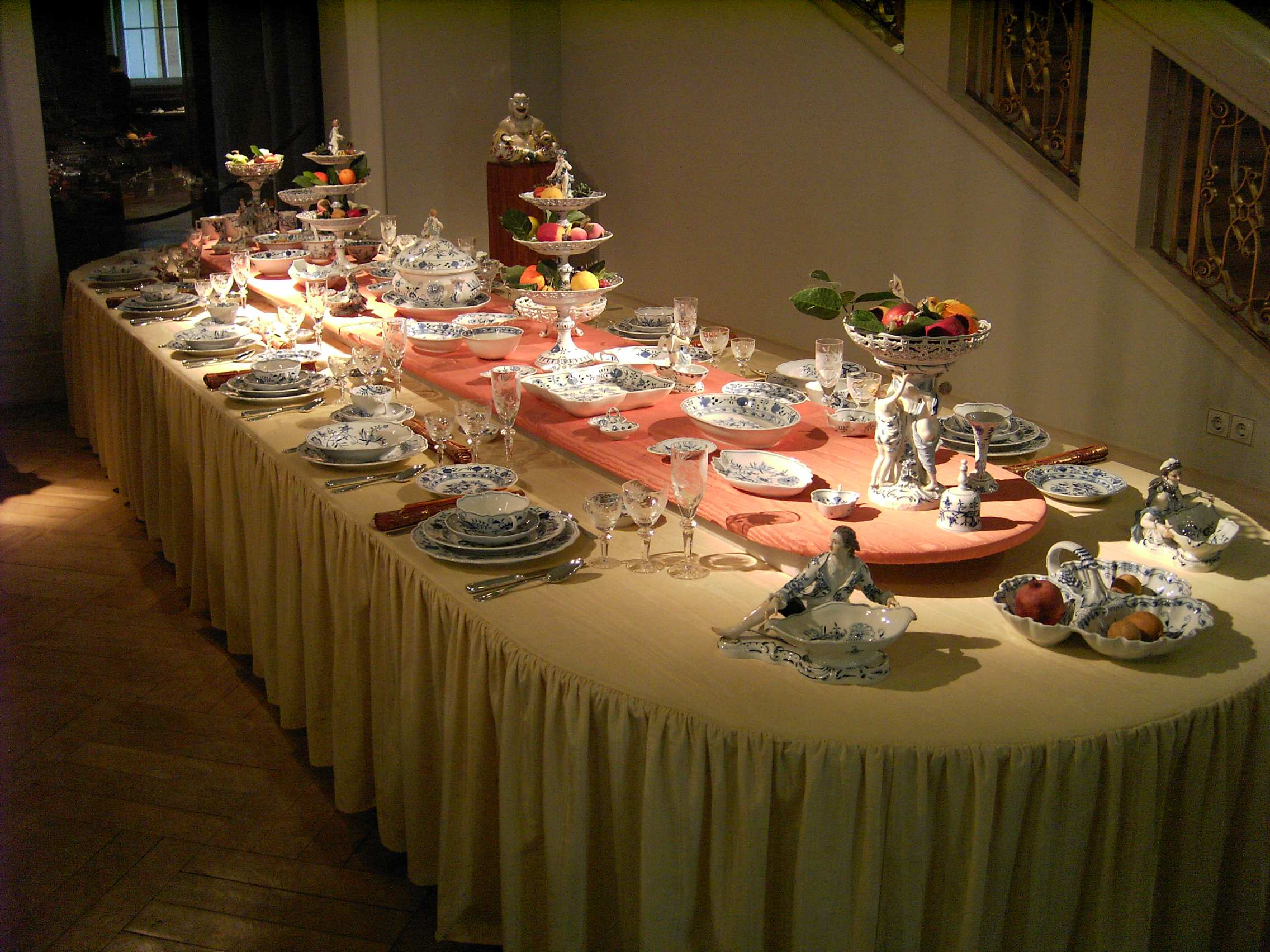
A formally laid table, set with a dinner service

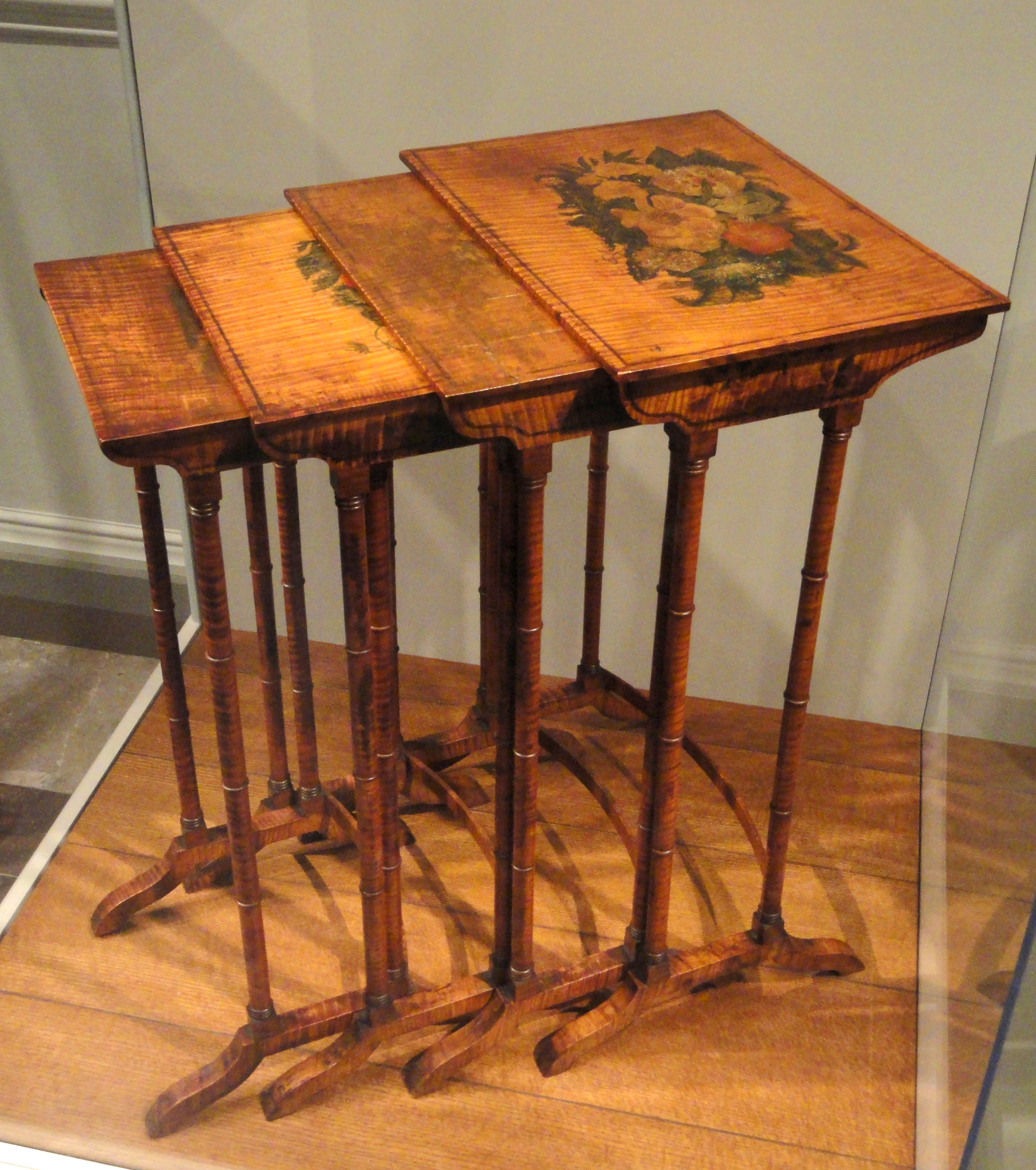
Nested tables

Tables of various shapes, heights, and sizes are designed for specific uses:

- Dining room tables are designed to be used for formal dining.
- Bedside tables, nightstands, or night tables are small tables used in a bedroom. They are often used for convenient placement of a small lamp, alarm clock, glasses, or other personal items.
- Drop-leaf tables have a fixed section in the middle and a hinged section (leaf) on either side that can be folded down.
- Gateleg tables have one or two hinged leaves supported by hinged legs.
- Coffee tables are low tables designed for use in a living room, in front of a sofa, for convenient placement of drinks, books, or other personal items.
- Refectory tables are long tables designed to seat many people for meals.
- Drafting tables usually have a top that can be tilted for making a large or technical drawing. They may also have a ruler or similar element integrated.
- Workbenches are sturdy tables, often elevated for use with a high stool or while standing, which are used for assembly, repairs, or other precision handwork.
- Nested tables are a set of small tables of graduated size that can be stacked together, each fitting within the one immediately larger. They are for occasional use (such as a tea party), hence the stackable design.

== Specialized types ==
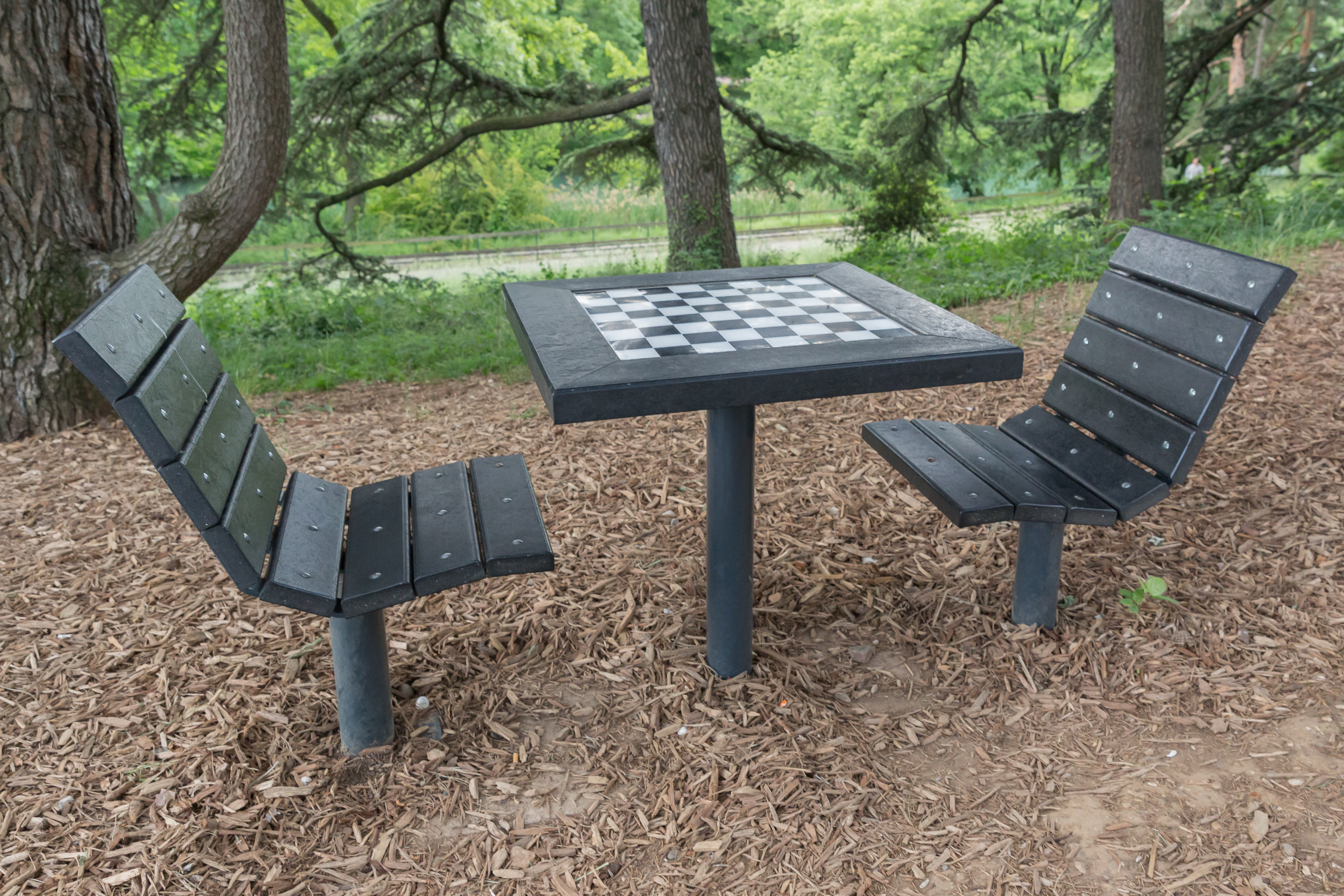
Chess table

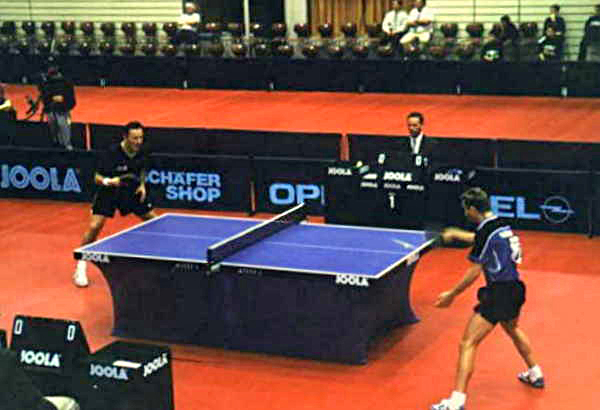
Competitive table tennis

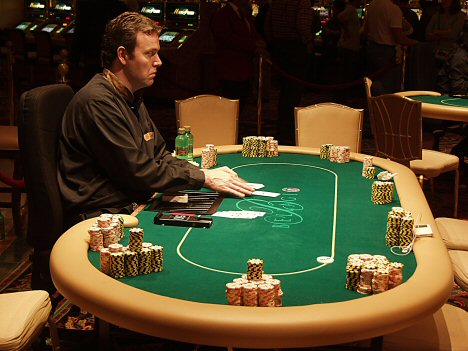
Poker table

Historically, various types of tables have become popular for specific uses:

- Billiards tables are bounded tables on which billiards-type games are played. All provide a flat surface, usually composed of slate and covered with cloth, elevated above the ground.
- Chess tables are a type of games table that integrates a chessboard.
- Drum tables are round tables introduced for writing, with drawers around the platform.
- End tables are small tables typically placed beside couches or armchairs. Often lamps will be placed on an end table.
- Loo tables were very popular in the 18th and 19th centuries as candlestands, tea tables, or small dining tables, although they were originally made for the popular card game loo or lanterloo. Their typically round or oval tops have a tilting mechanism, which enables them to be stored out of the way (e.g. in room corners) when not in use. A further development in this direction was the "birdcage" table, the top of which could both revolve and tilt.
- Overbed tables are narrow rectangular tables whose top is designed for use above the bed, especially for hospital patients.
- Pembroke tables, first introduced during the 18th century, were popular throughout the 19th century. The main characteristic of these drop-leaf tables was a rectangular or oval top with folding leaves on each side. Most examples have one or more drawers and four legs, sometimes connected by stretchers. Their design meant they could easily be stored or moved about and conveniently opened for serving tea, dining, writing, or other occasional uses. One account attributes the design of the Pembroke table to Henry Herbert, 9th Earl of Pembroke (1693–1751).
- Poker tables or card tables are used to play poker or other card games.
- Work tables were small tables designed to hold sewing materials and implements, providing a convenient work place for women who sewed. They appeared during the 18th century and were popular throughout the 19th century. Most examples have rectangular tops, sometimes with folding leaves, and usually one or more drawers fitted with partitions. Early examples typically have four legs, often standing on casters, while later examples sometimes have turned columns or other forms of support.
- Sofa tables are similar to Pembroke tables and usually have longer and narrower tops. They were specifically designed for placement directly in front of sofas for serving tea, writing, dining, or other convenient uses. Generally speaking, a sofa table is a tall, narrow table used behind a sofa to hold lamps or decorative objects.
- Table tennis tables are usually masonite or a similar wood, layered with a smooth low-friction coating. they are divided into two halves by a low net, which separates opposing players.

== Gallery ==
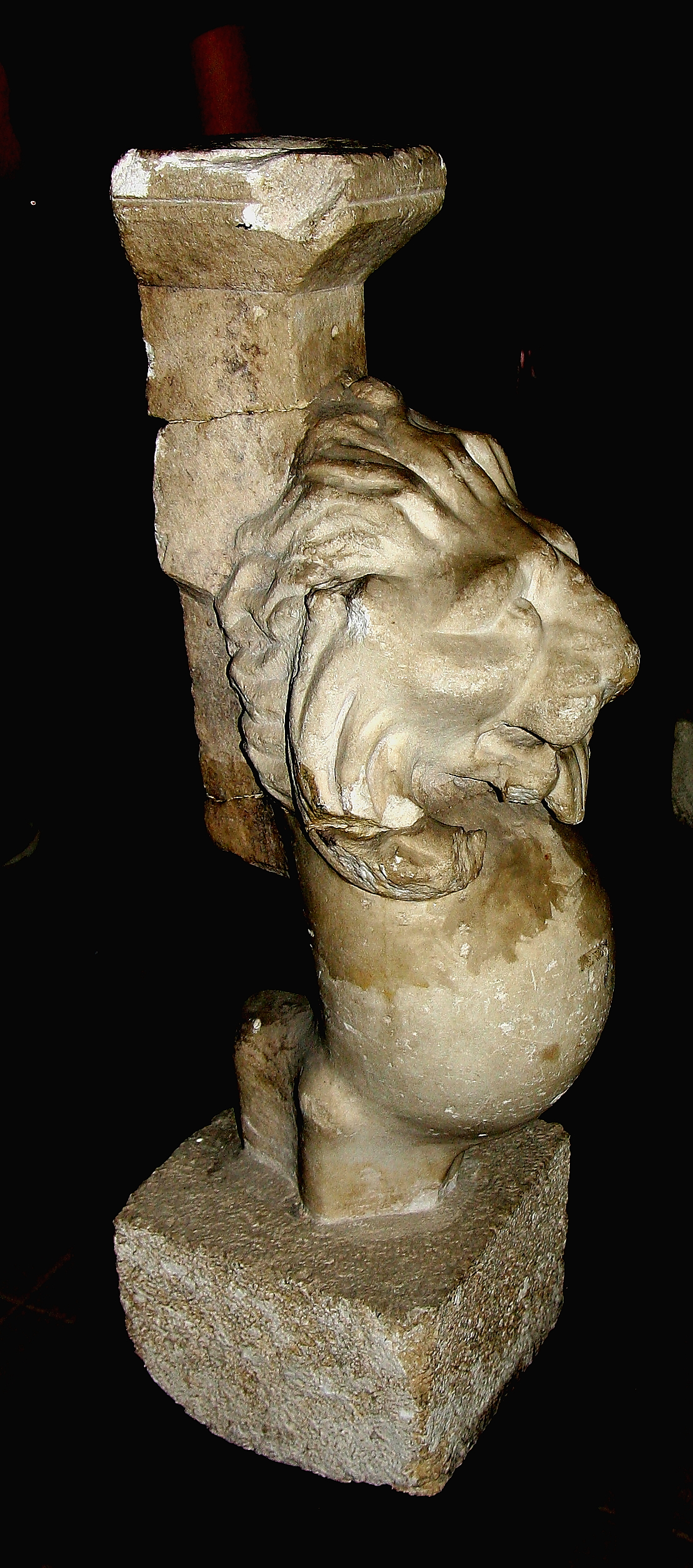
Roman richly ornate table leg

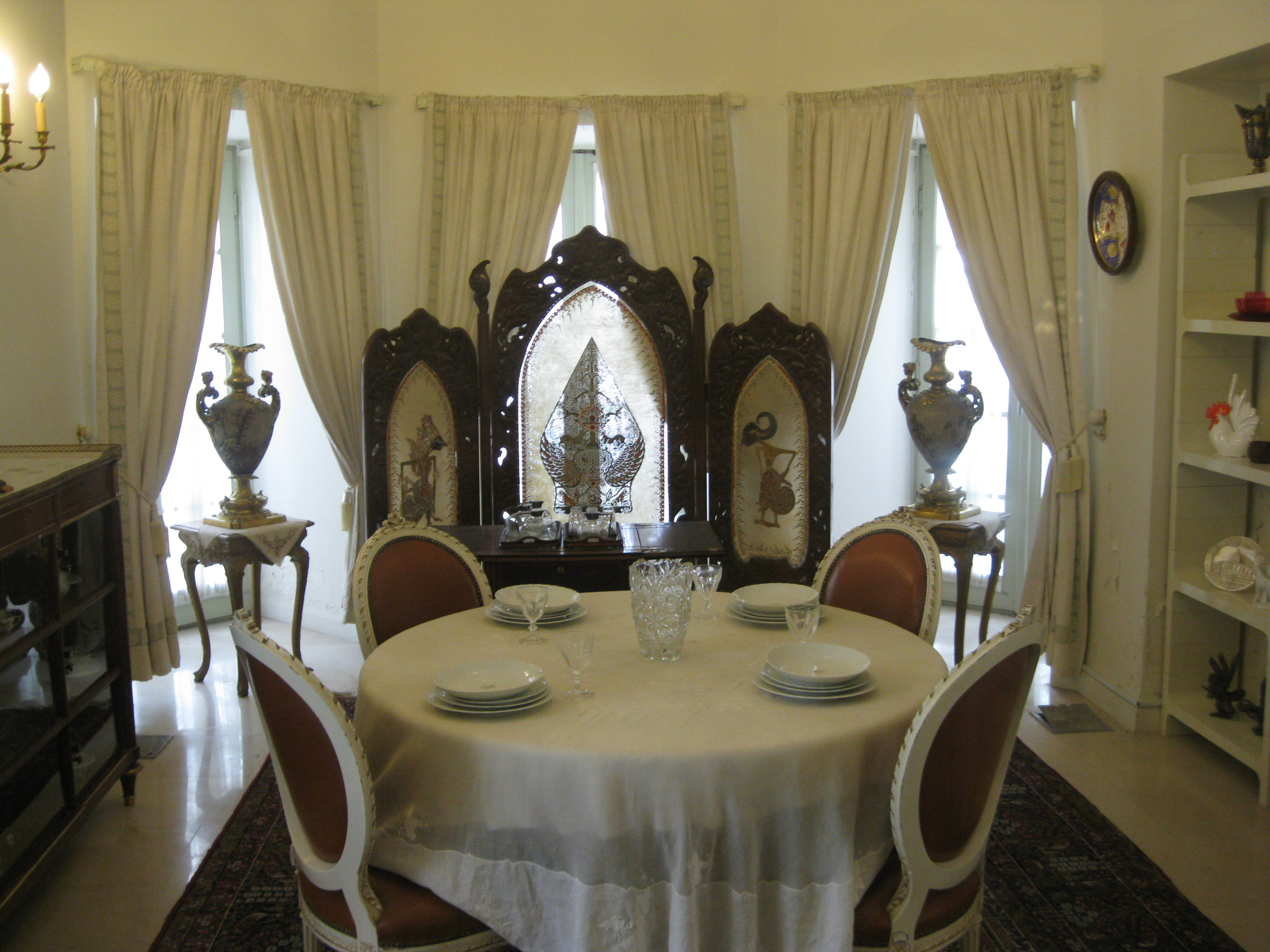
A chic table in an Iranian palace

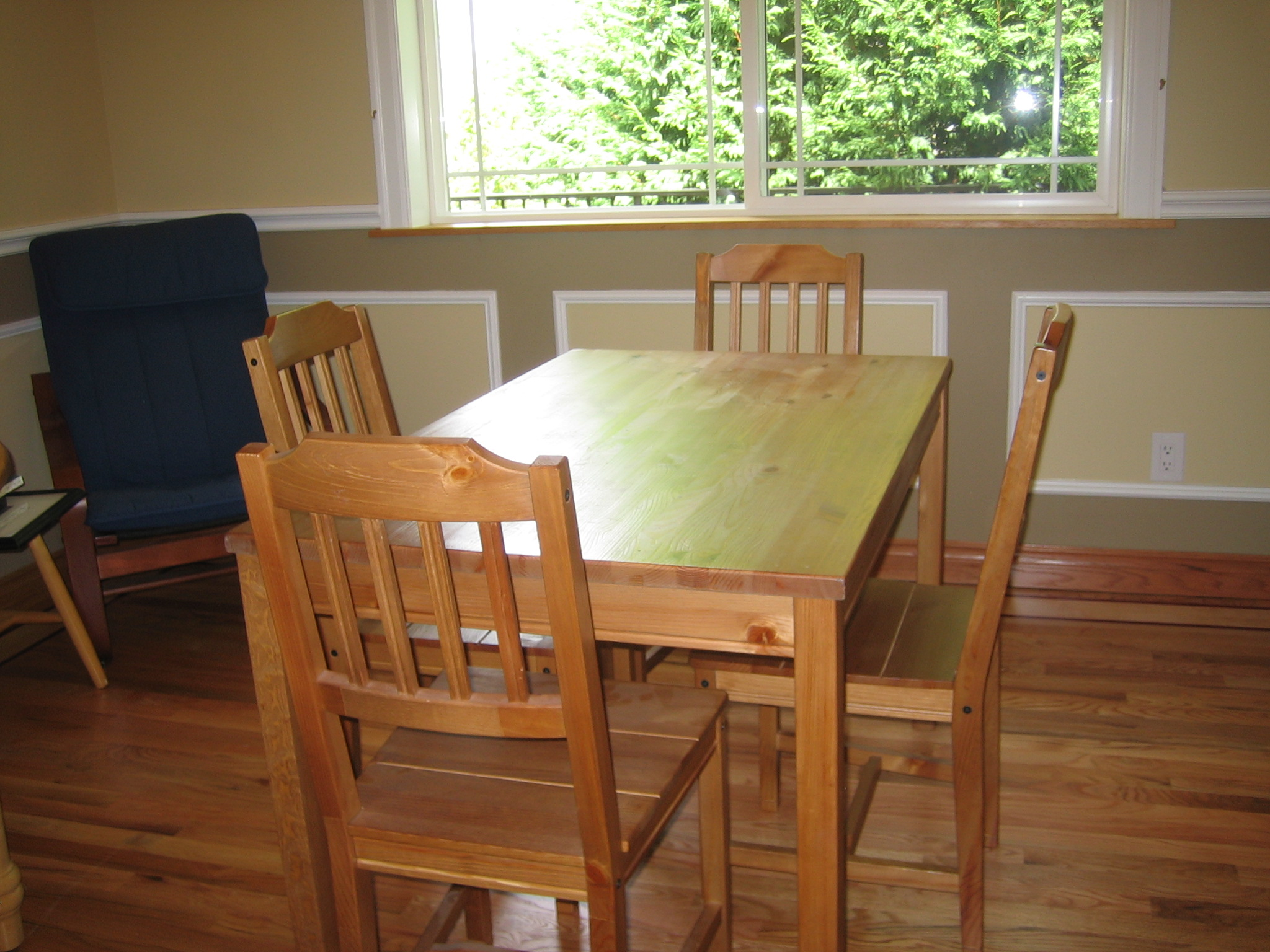
A wooden dining table and chairs

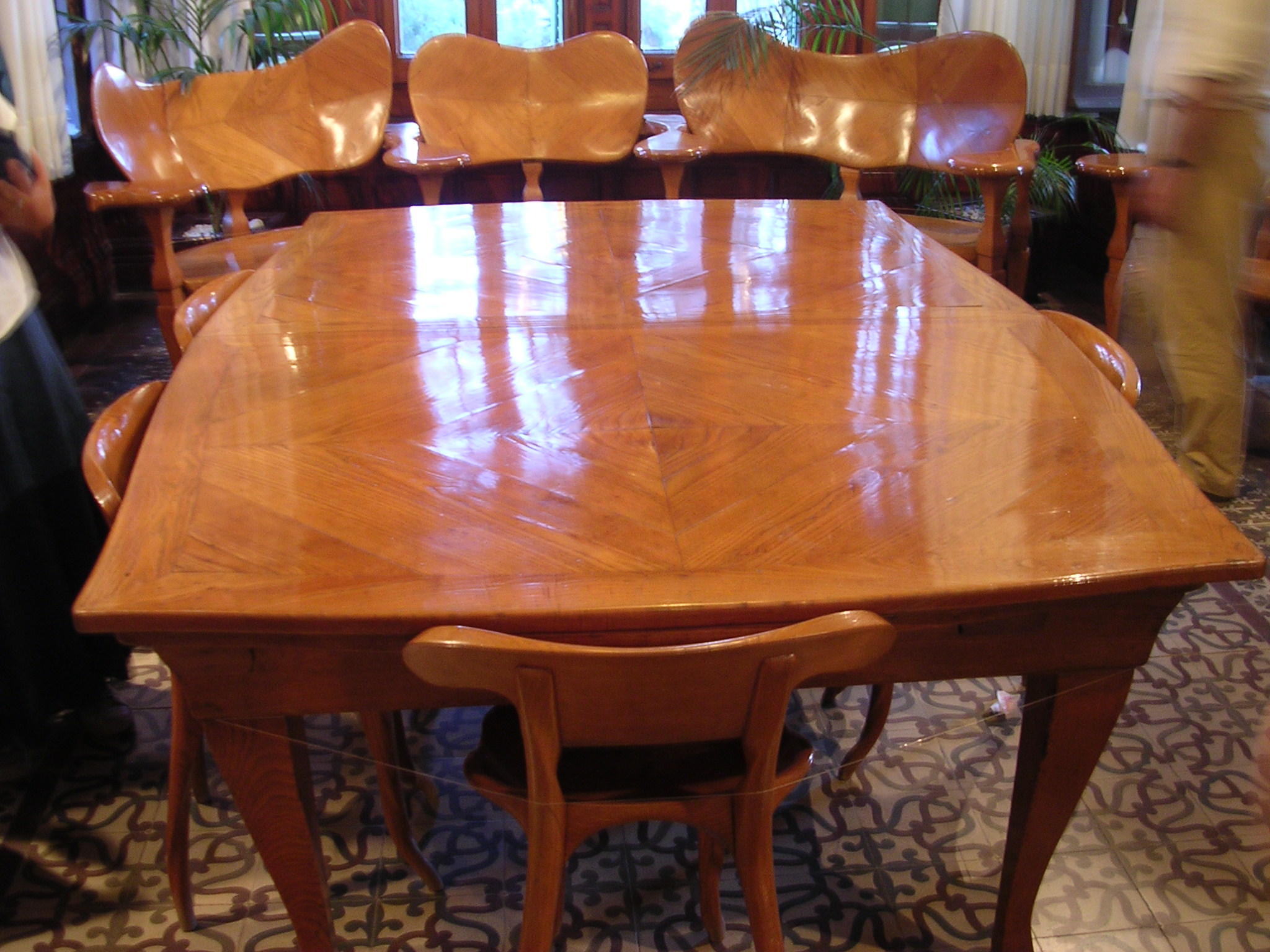
Dining table by Antoni Gaudí

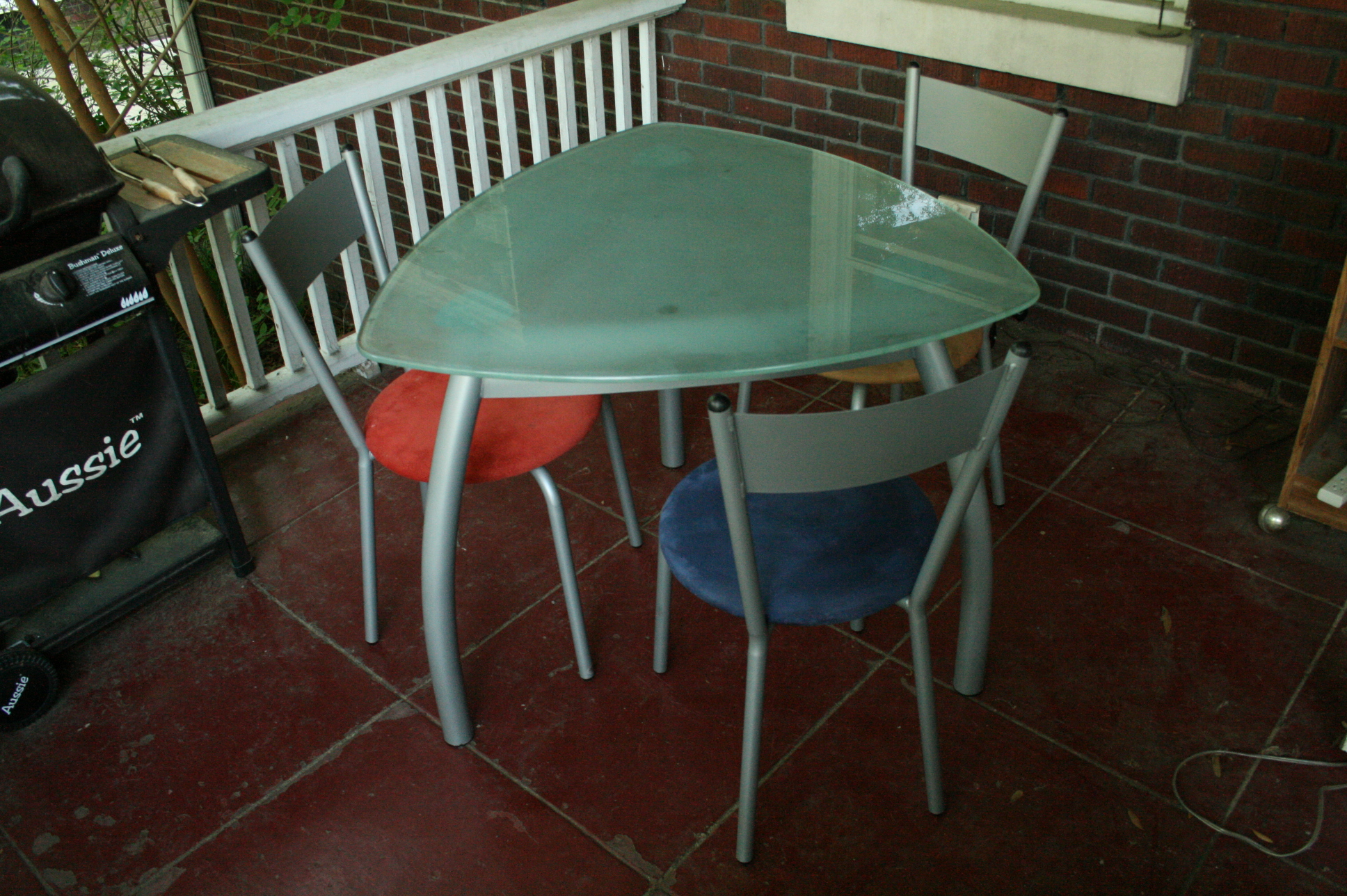
Solid glass tabletop on an outdoors patio

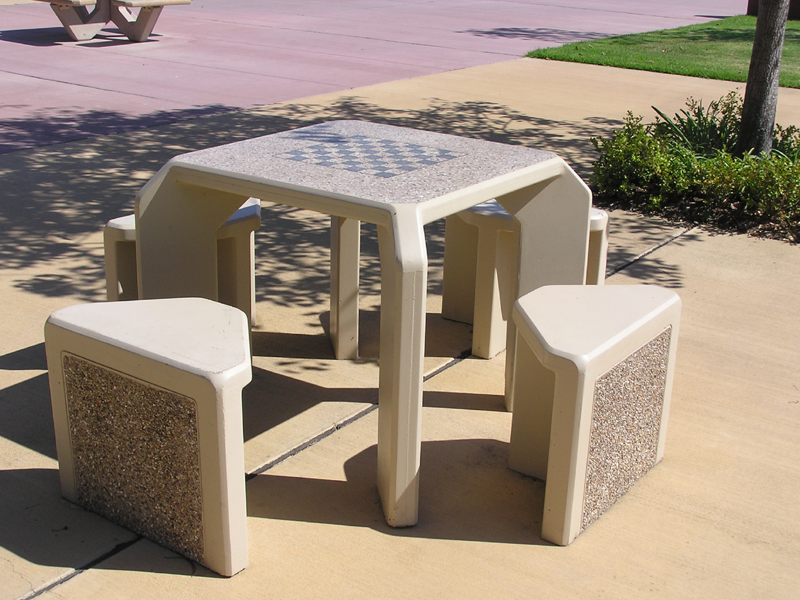
Outdoors table with a chessboard built into its top

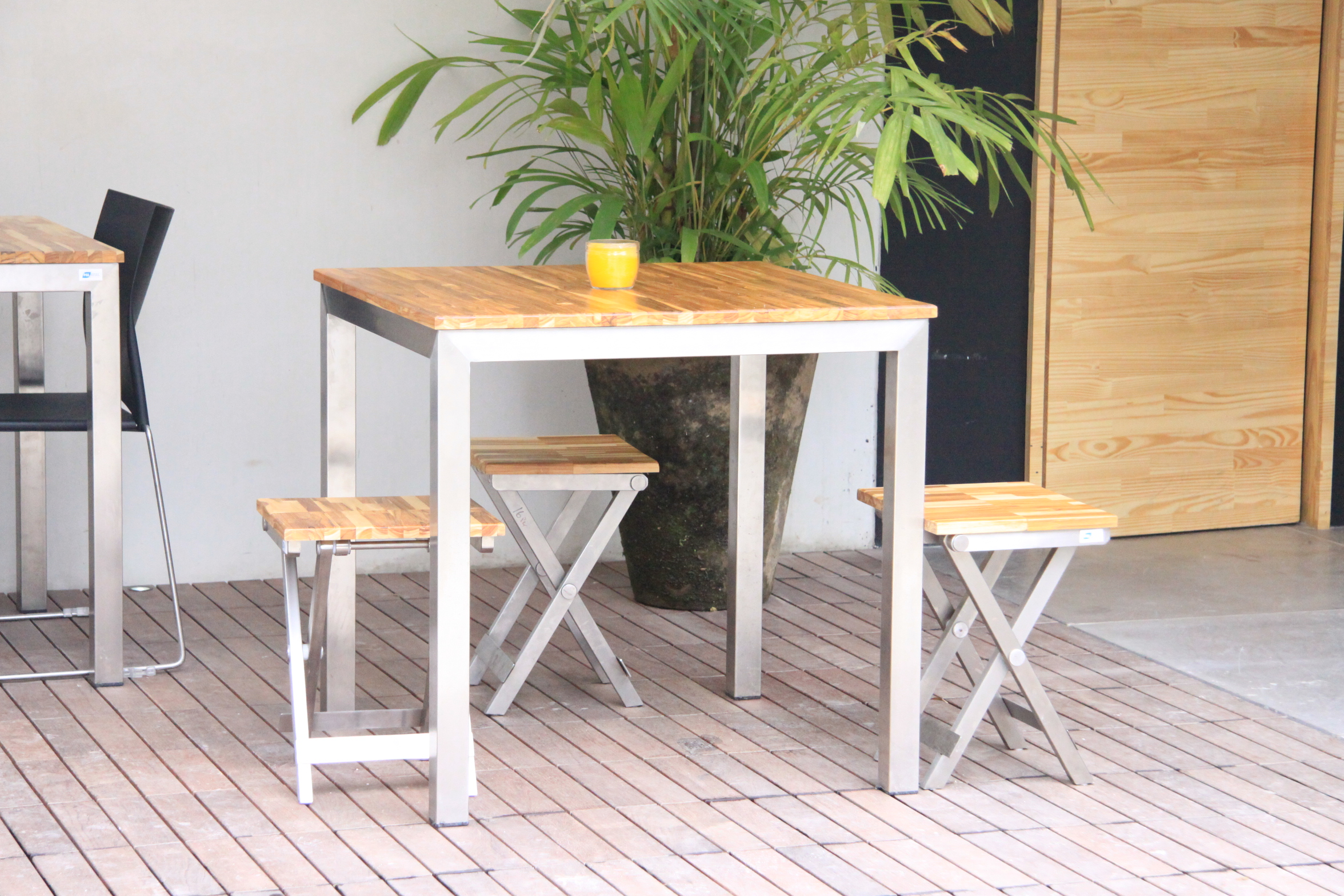
A modern Brazilian stainless steel table made with FSC-certified eucalyptus

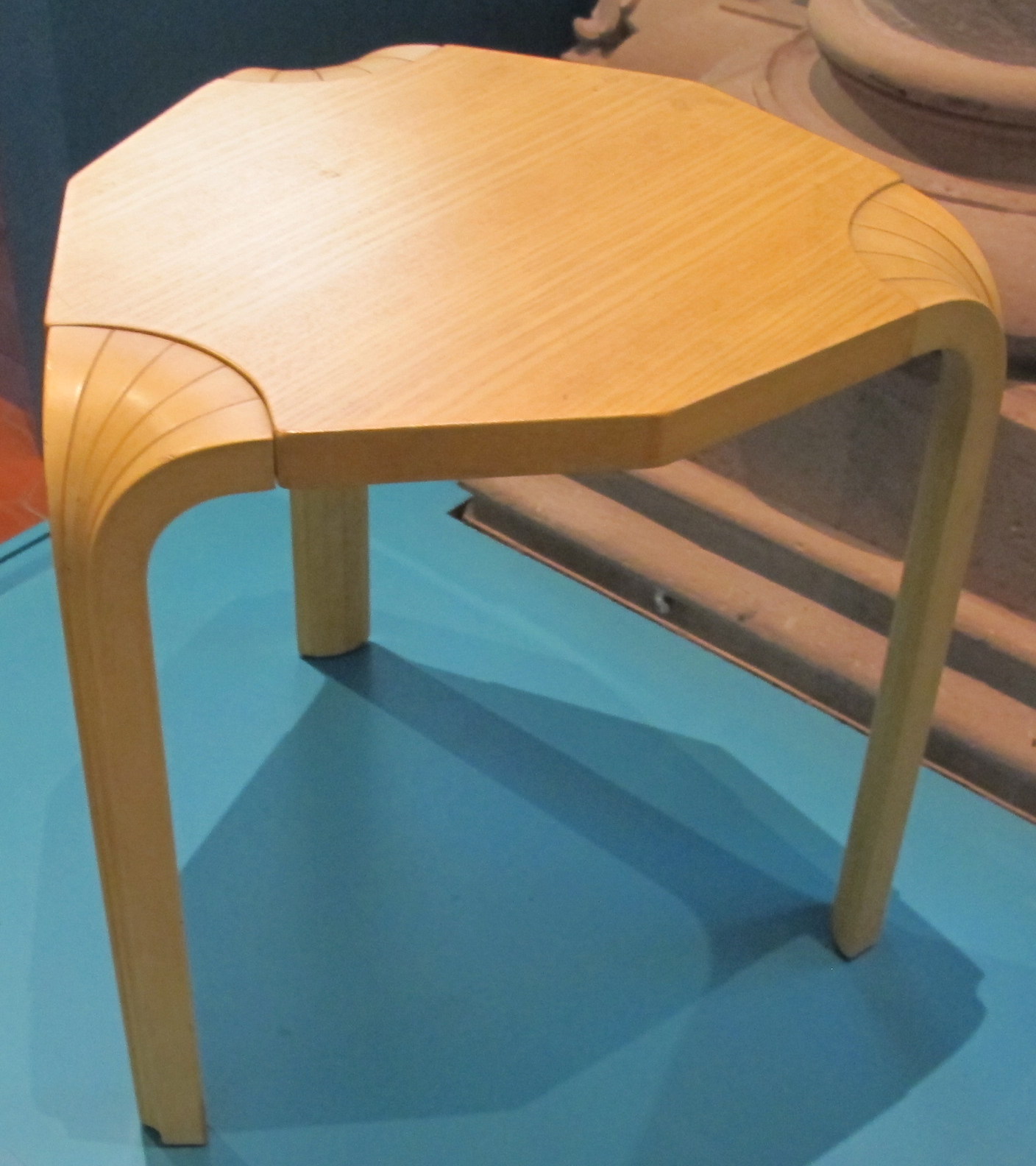
Modernist sidetable by Alvar Aalto

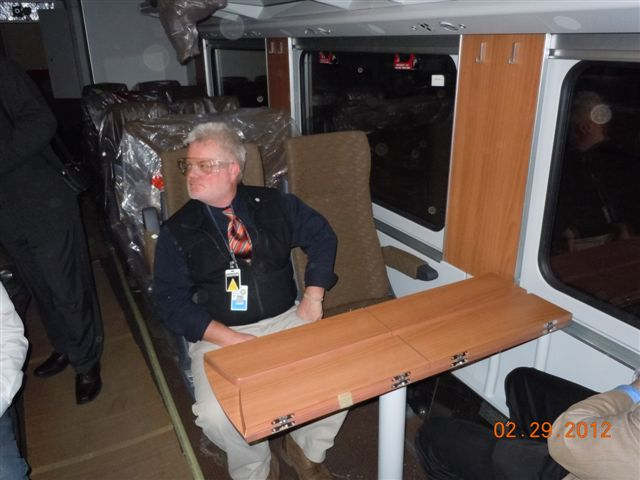
A pedestal table surface can be folded down in a passenger train

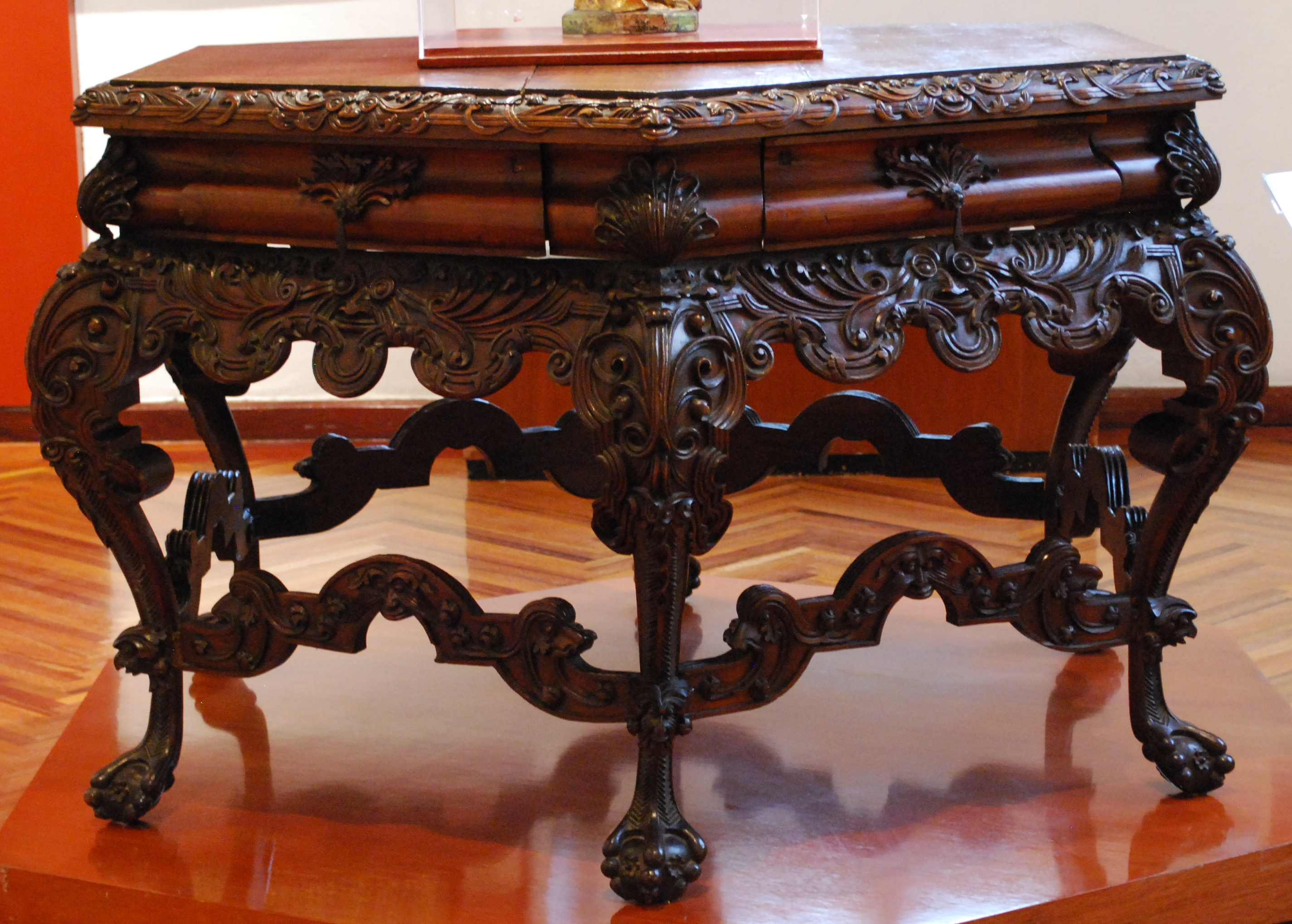
Carved wooden table from unknown century at the Franz Mayer Museum in Mexico City

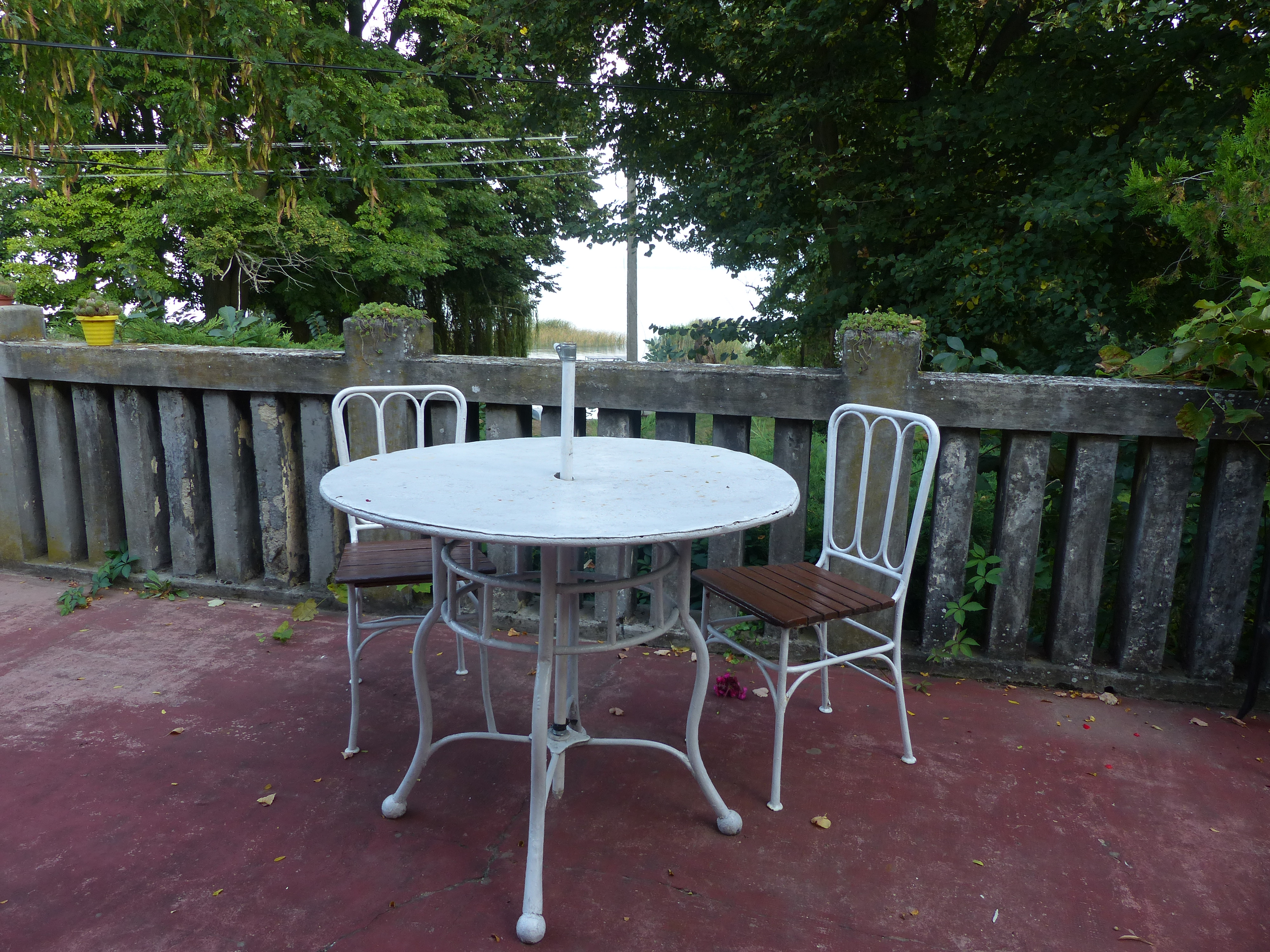
Metal dining table and chairs on the terrace

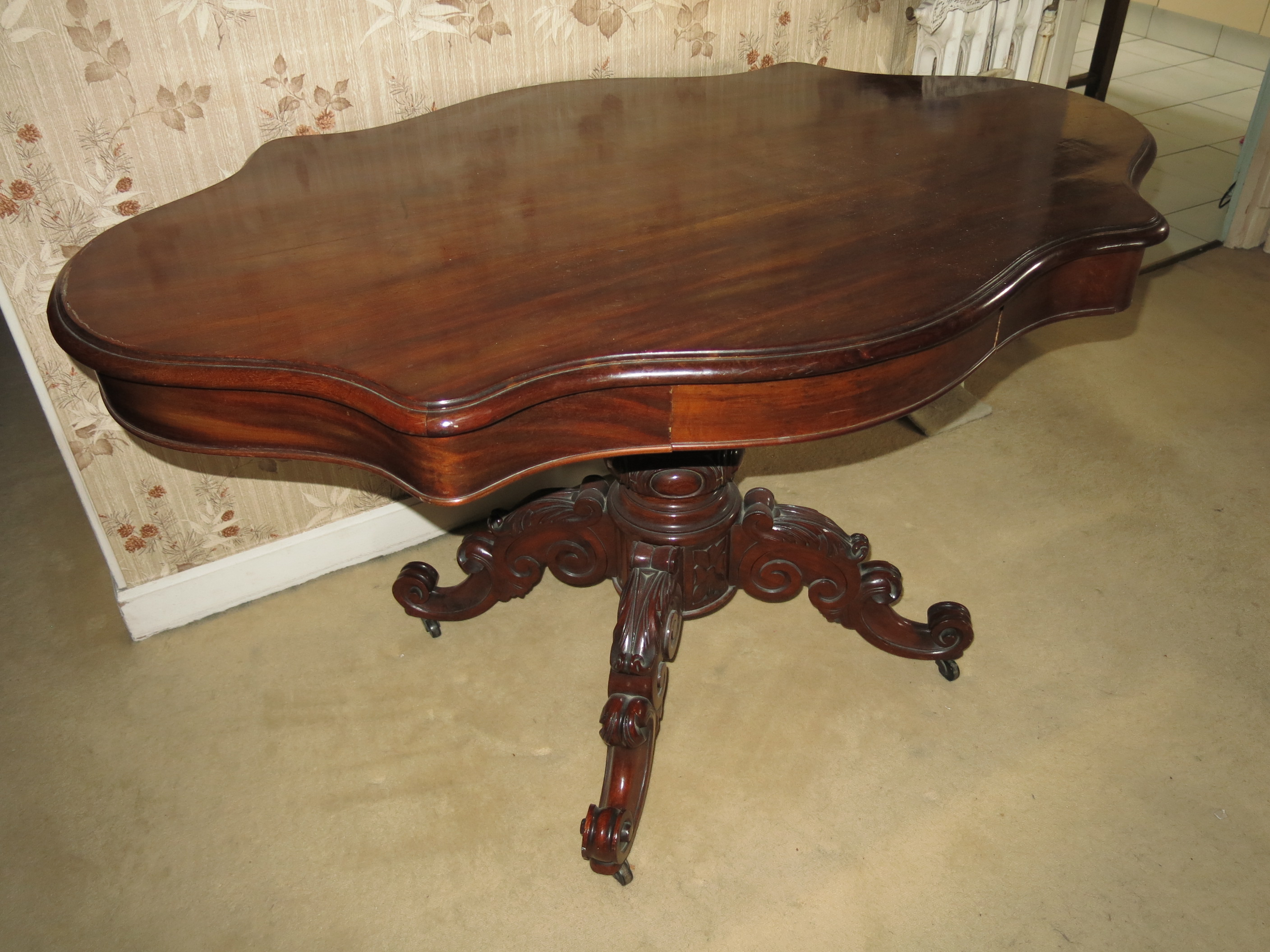
Violin table

=== Pedestal tables ===
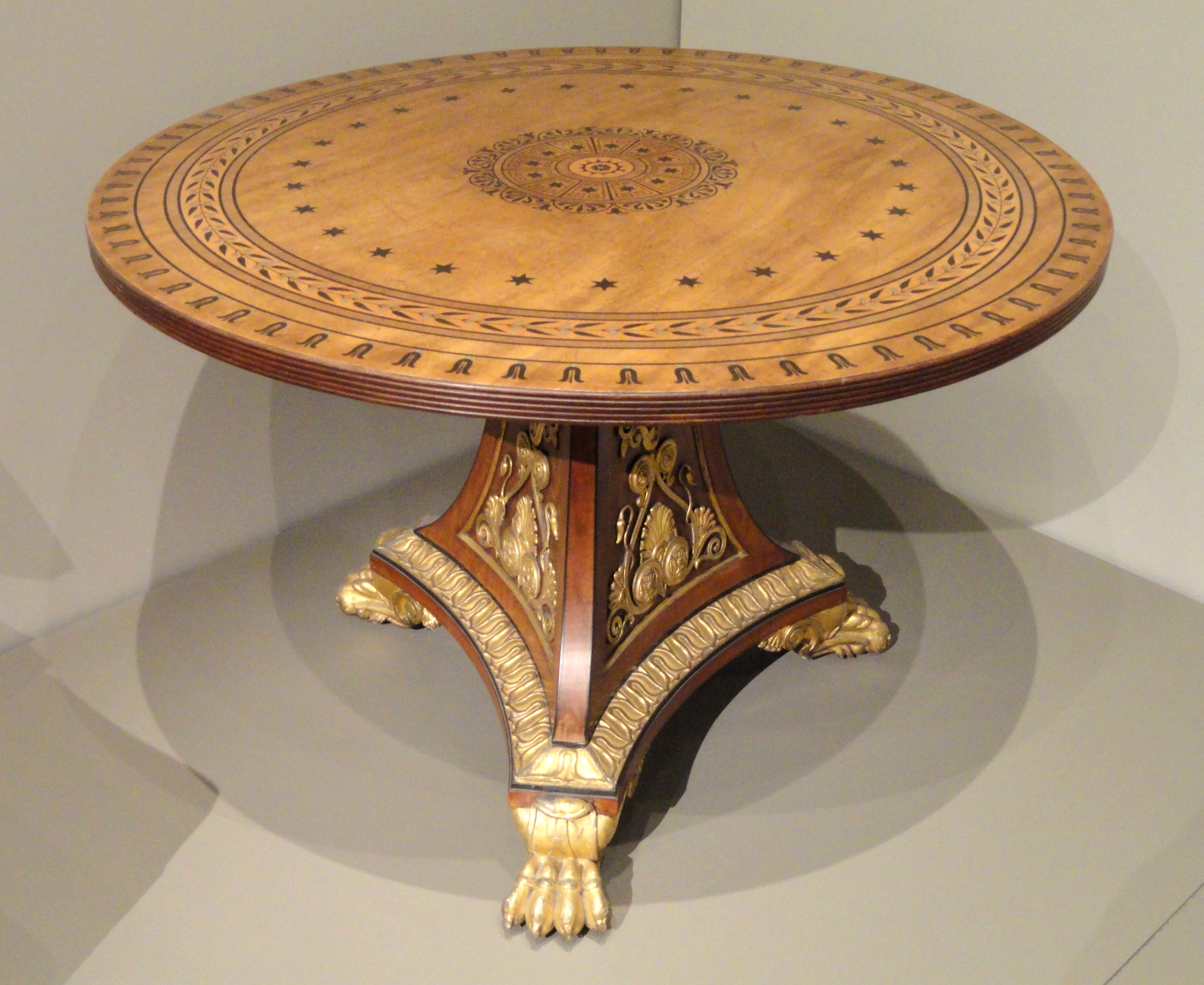
Single pedestal

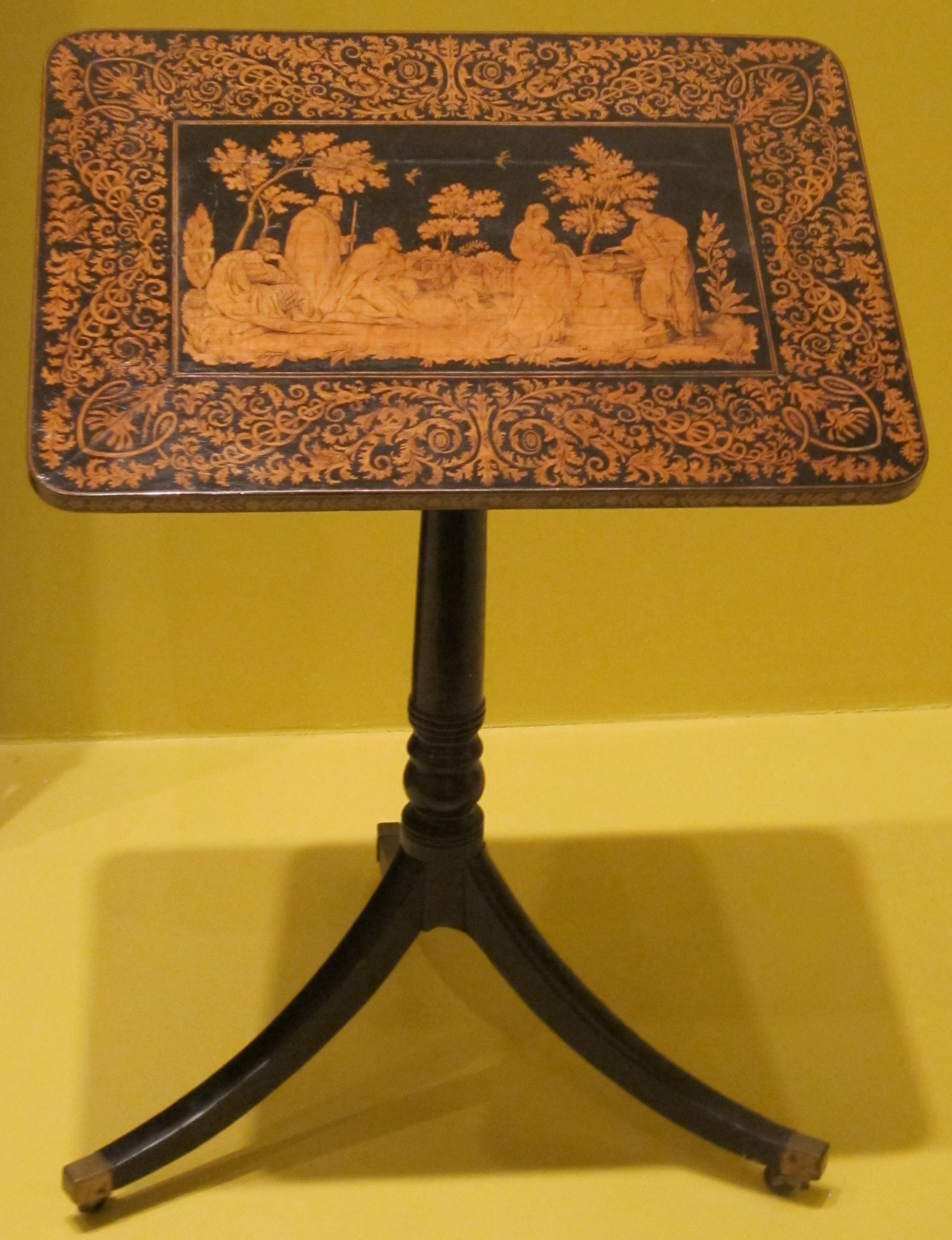
Small single pedestal

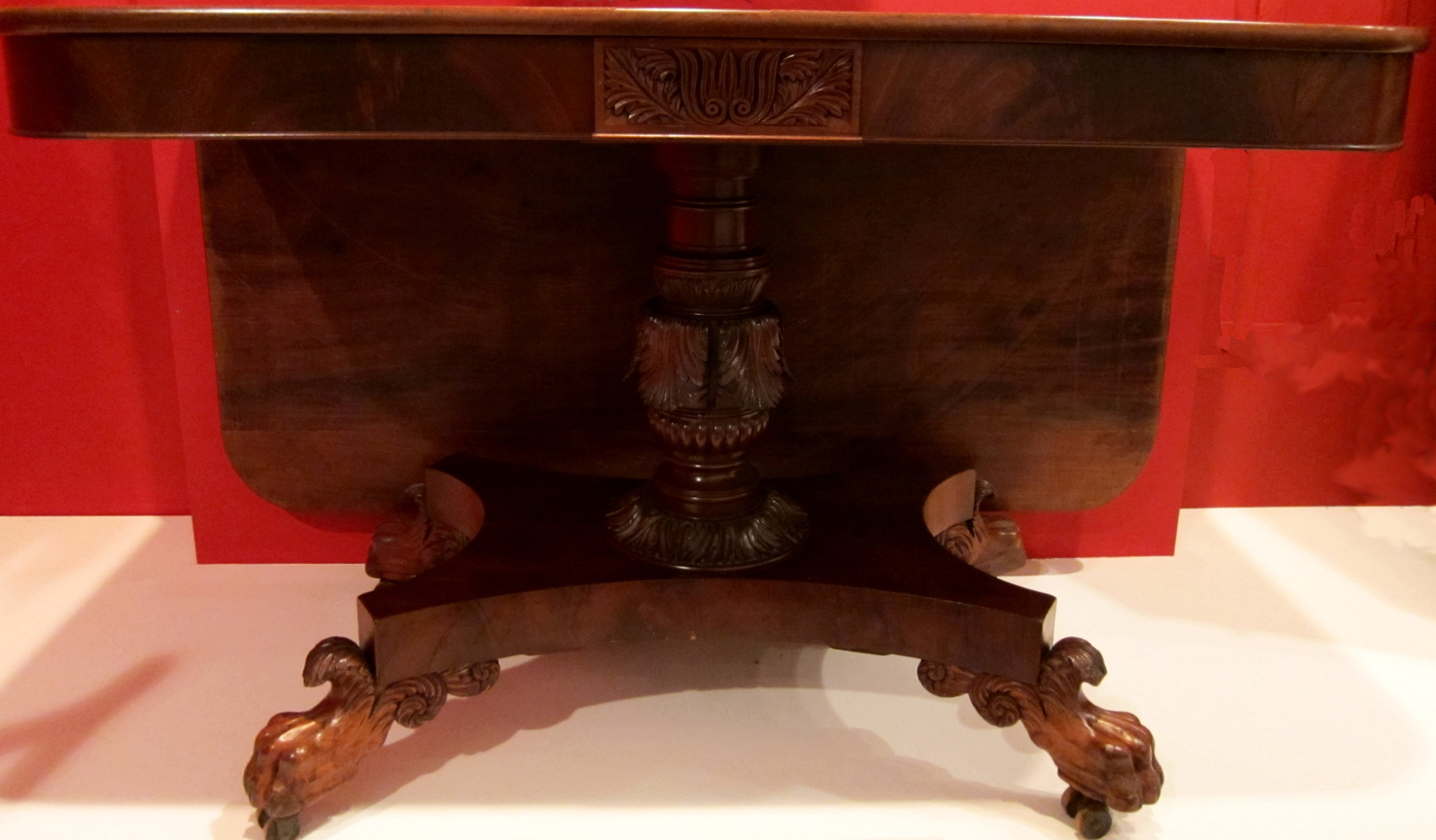
Dropleaf single pedestal

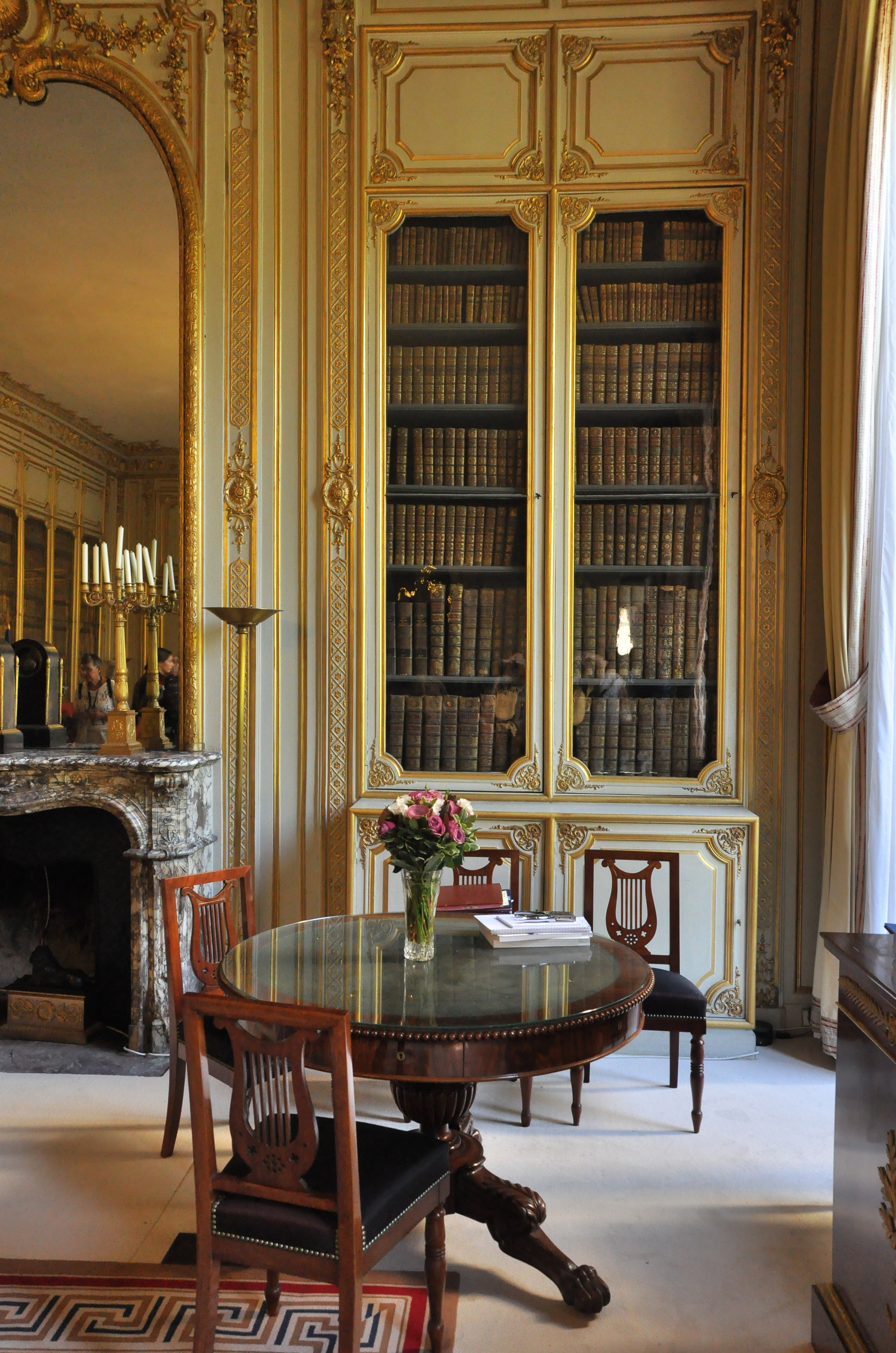
Oval single pedestal

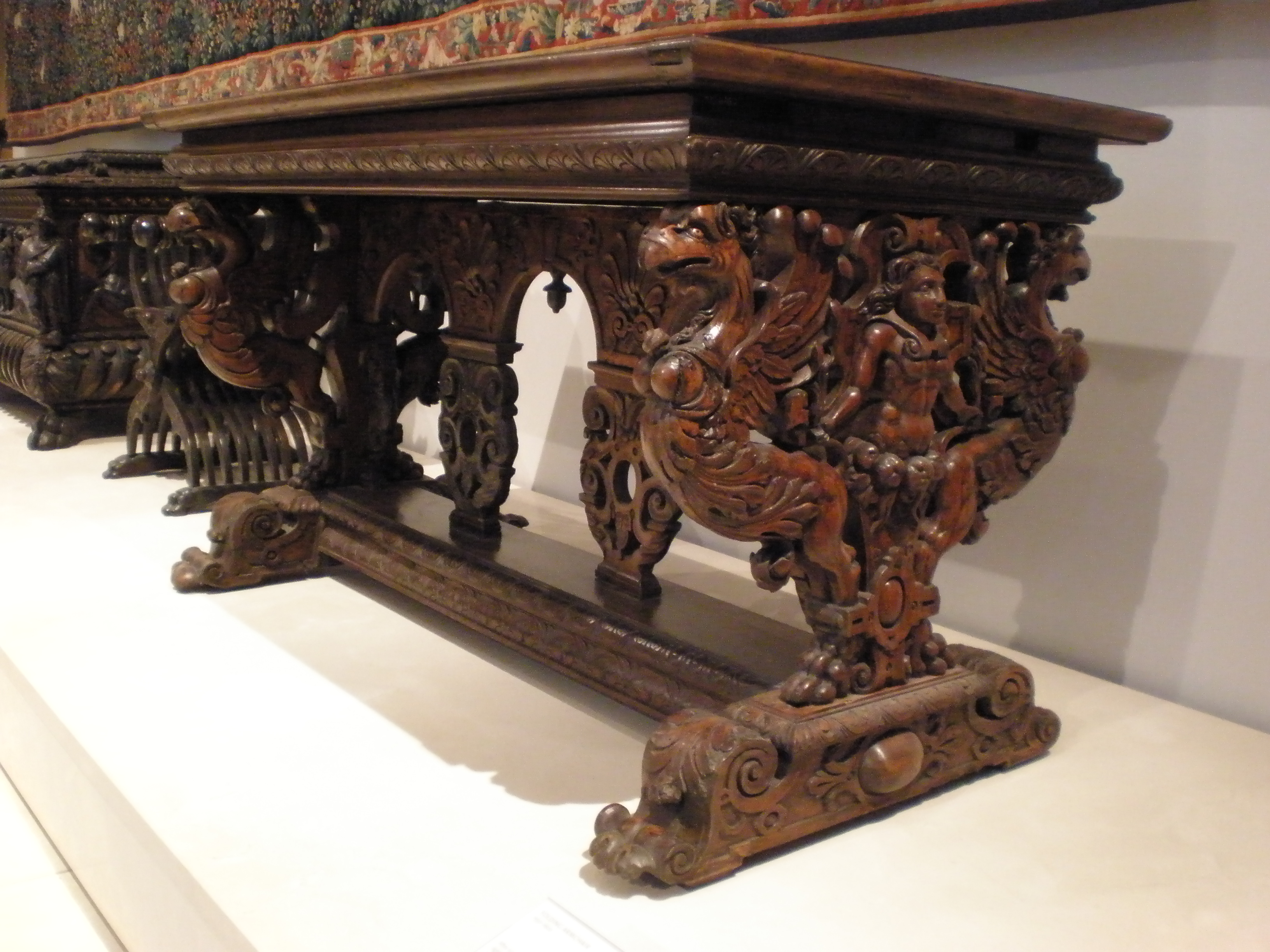
Multiple pedestal

== See also ==
- Folding table
  - Chabudai—Japanese small table
- Kitchen table
- Nightstand
- Parsons table
- Picnic table
- Table tennis
- Trestle table
- TV tray table

== Bibliography ==
- Kenny, Peter M.; Brown, Michael K.; Bretter, Frances F.; Thurlow, Matthew A. (2011). Duncan Phyfe: Master Cabinetmaker in New York. New York: Metropolitan Museum of Art. ISBN 9780300155112.
