= Pier glass =

Decorative wall mirror

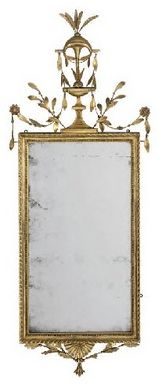
Late-19th century giltwood pier glass, with classical urn foliage and wheat ear cresting. This is the classic form of the pier glass. Christie's South Kensington, 14 March 2008

A pier glass or trumeau mirror is a mirror which is placed on a pier, i.e. a wall between two windows supporting an upper structure.

It is therefore generally of a long and tall shape to fit the space. It may be as a hanging mirror or as mirrored glass affixed flush to the pier, in which case it is sometimes of the same shape and design as the windows themselves. This was a common decorating feature in the reception rooms of Neoclassical 18th-century houses.

A pier table or console table typically stood below the pier glass; very often these were made as a matching set.

== Trumeau mirrors ==
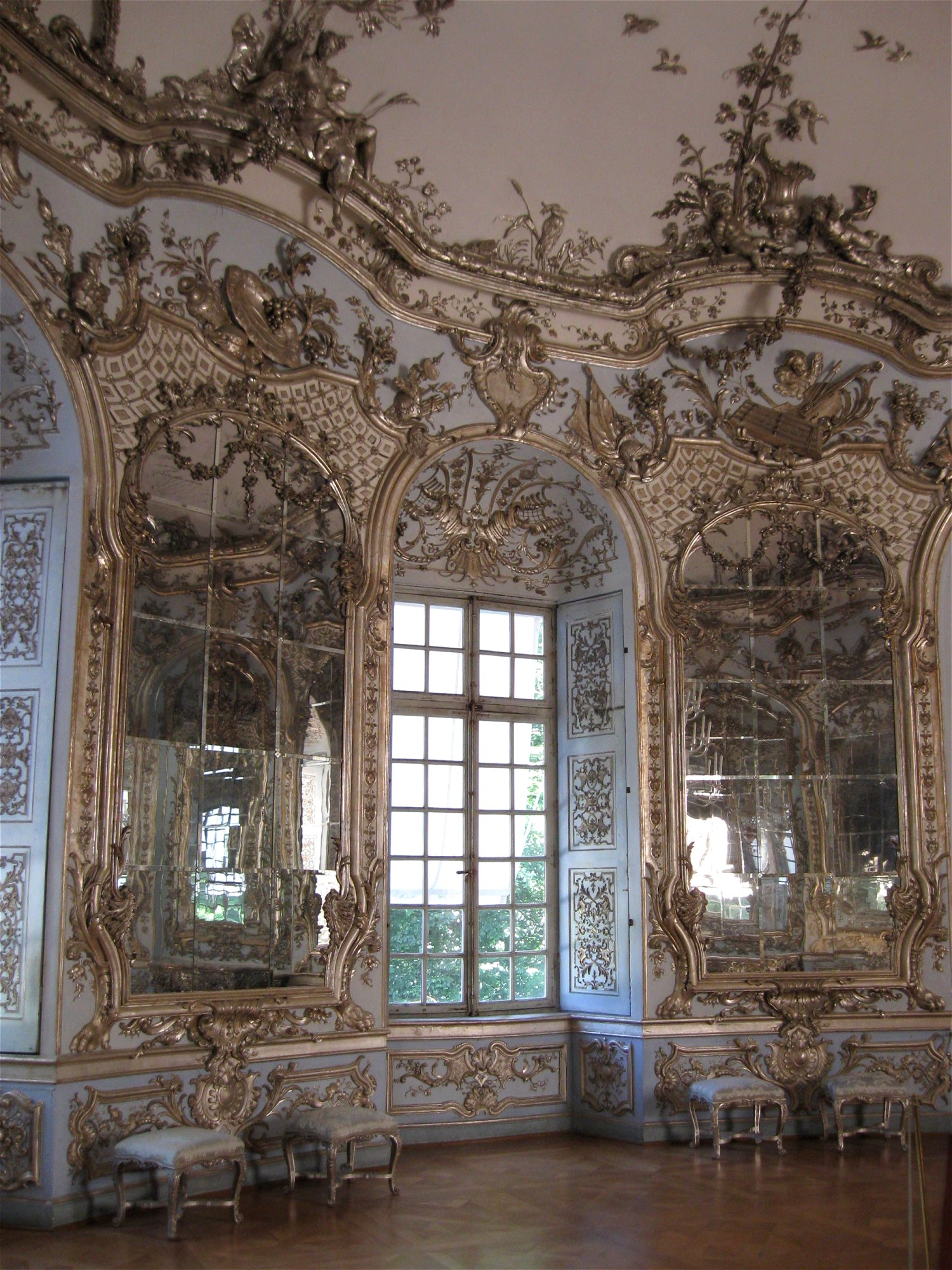
Large 18th-century Rococo pier glass in the Amalienburg Pavilion, Schloss Nymphenburg.

A trumeau mirror is a type of wall mirror originally manufactured in France in the later 18th century. It takes its name from the French word trumeau, which designates the space between windows. Such a mirror, usually rectangular, could also hang above an overmantel. A decorative carved or painted scene was the prominent characteristic, and could dominate the actual mirror.
