= Nightstand =

Bedroom furniture

A modern style nightstand

A nightstand, alternatively night table, bedside table, daystand or bedside cabinet, is a small table or cabinet designed to stand beside a bed or elsewhere in a bedroom. Modern nightstands are usually small bedside tables, often with one or sometimes more drawers and/or shelves and less commonly with a small door. They are often used to support items that might be useful before going to sleep or after waking up, such as a table lamp, reading matter, cell phone, eyeglasses, tissues, a drink, or medication.

Before indoor flush toilets became commonplace, the main function of a nightstand was to contain a chamber pot. As a result, early nightstands were often small cabinets, sometimes fitted with a drawer, and usually containing an enclosed storage space below covered by one or more doors. Another term sometimes given to such cabinets was commode.

French, Italian and Spanish antique nightstands usually have one drawer and an enclosed storage space with one door. They can be embellished with gold leaf finish, bronze or parquetry inlaid.

Wood and pressboard are the most common materials used for nightstands.
