= Sewing table =

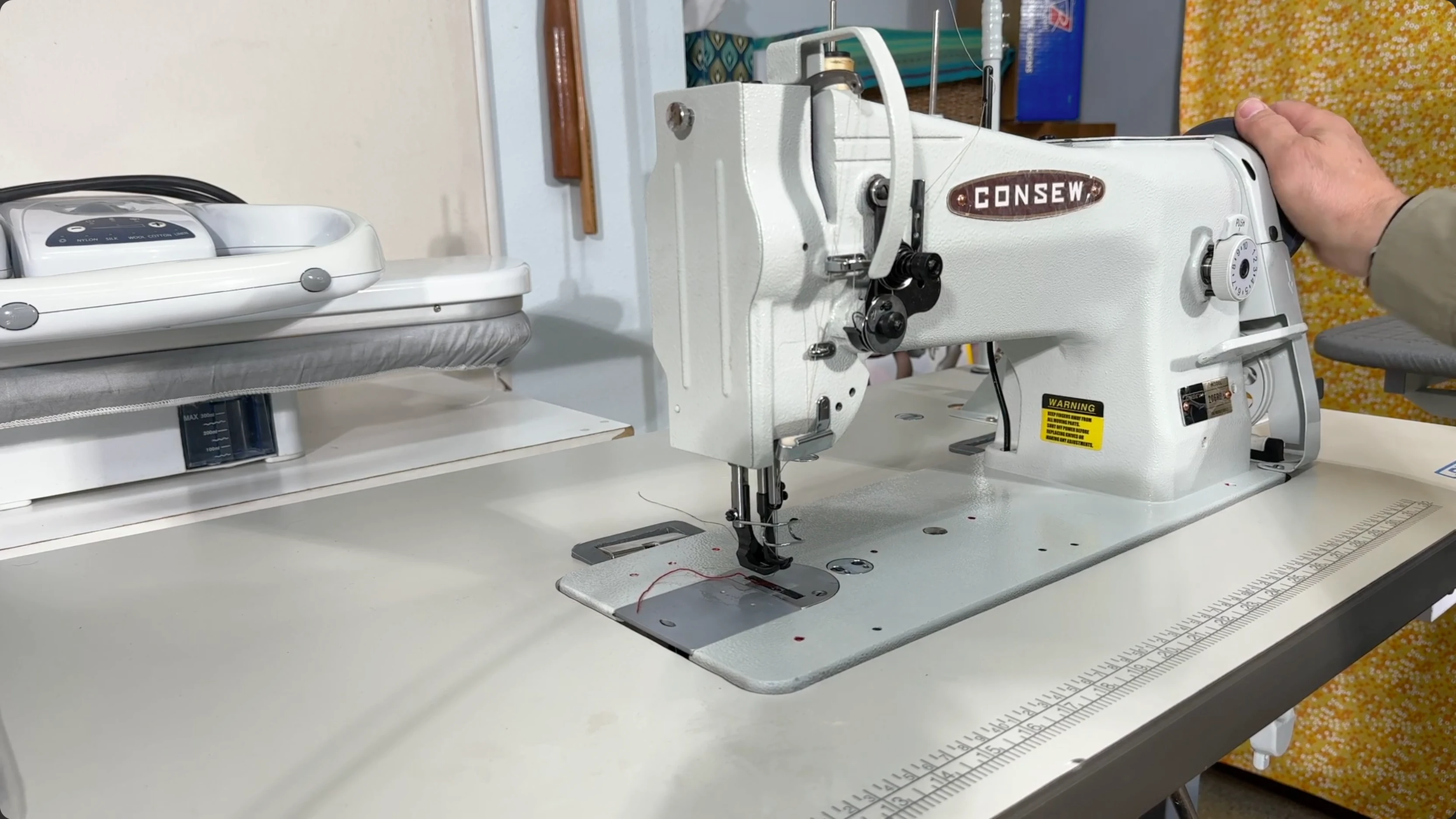
Sewing table for upholstery

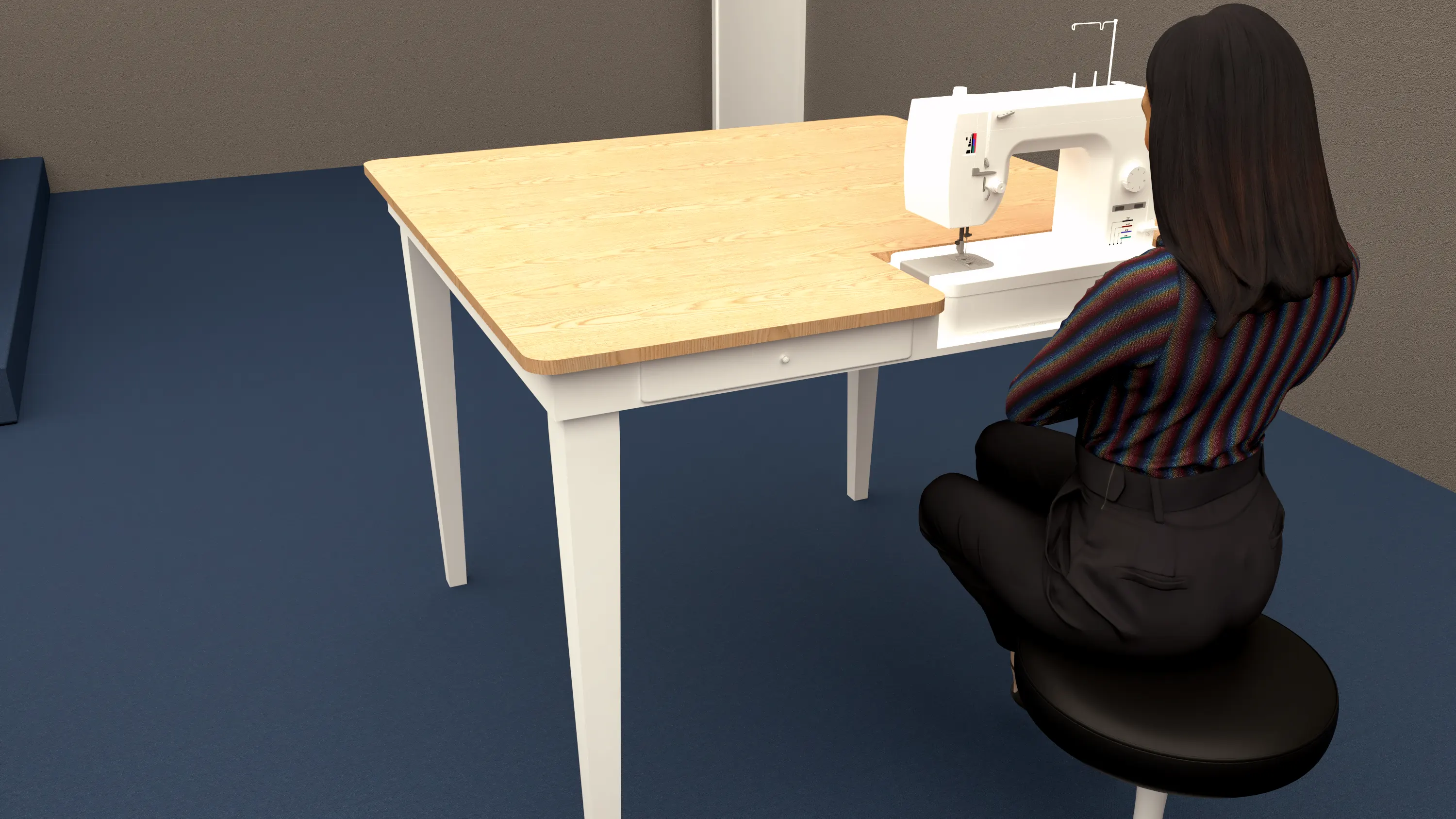
3D design of a sewing table

A sewing table, or work table, is a table or desk used for sewing. It generally has a large work surface and a full set of sewing tools. A chair and a waste bin are typically placed nearby. A common attachment is a dropleaf to give expanded space. Other attachments may include a cloth bag for storing sewing materials, drawers, or shelves.

== History ==
The sewing table originated in England around 1770 and was adopted in post-Revolutionary War America. Prior to the use of the sewing table, women kept needlework in a basket or bag. It was designed to provide a surface and storage for a gentlewoman’s needlework or other leisure activities, including basket-weaving, crochet, macramé, and painting, as it was customary for women to gather around the table to work. Most tables created in the U.S. during this time were in the Sheraton or Empire styles and constructed of mahogany.

In the mid-1800s, sewing machines were developed, and sewing tables were altered to accommodate them. The Singer cabinet works was established in 1868 as a contractor constructing the Singer Company’s sewing tables in South Bend, Indiana. The plant was initially designed for sewing table distribution in the western United States. In 1891, the plant expanded covering 60 acres and 20 acres of lumber yards with a factory railroad. The new plant handled all Singer operations with tables being shipped to the Eastern U.S. as well as Europe, South America, and Asia.
