= Console table =

Furniture

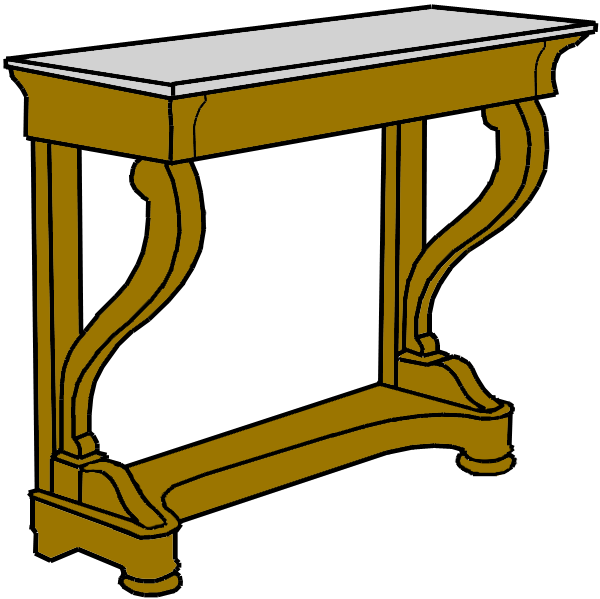
Self-supporting form of the console table. The bracket supports are frequently highly decorative

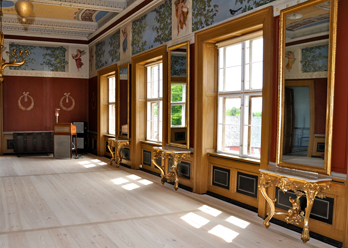
Console tables serving as pier tables underneath pier glasses, Denmark

A console table is a table whose top surface is supported by corbels or brackets rather than by the usual four legs. It is thus similar to a supported shelf and is not designed to serve as a stand-alone surface. It is frequently used as pier table (which may have legs of any variety), to abut a pier wall.

The term console derives from the compound Latin verb consolor "to alleviate, lighten", from the verb solor, "to assuage, soothe, relieve, mitigate", plus the preposition con/com/cum, "with".

A console shelf is a shelf fulfilling the same function as a console table.

== Types ==
Low console: Positioned at table height, or sometimes slightly higher, with its flat side against the wall. The front may be rounded or straight, depending on the period and style. Its support may consist of a single or double base, with the top attached to the wall; four legs curved inward in scrolls in the Empire style; or four straight legs in the modern style.

High console: A small shelf placed at about standing height, once used to hold a small lamp, a candle, or similar object.

From the 18th century onward, the term console came to refer to a small movable piece of furniture, previously known as the “foot” or “base” of a trumeau mirror or painting. It consists of a top supported by two or four legs joined by an ornamental strut.
