= Pier table =

Table designed to be placed against a wall

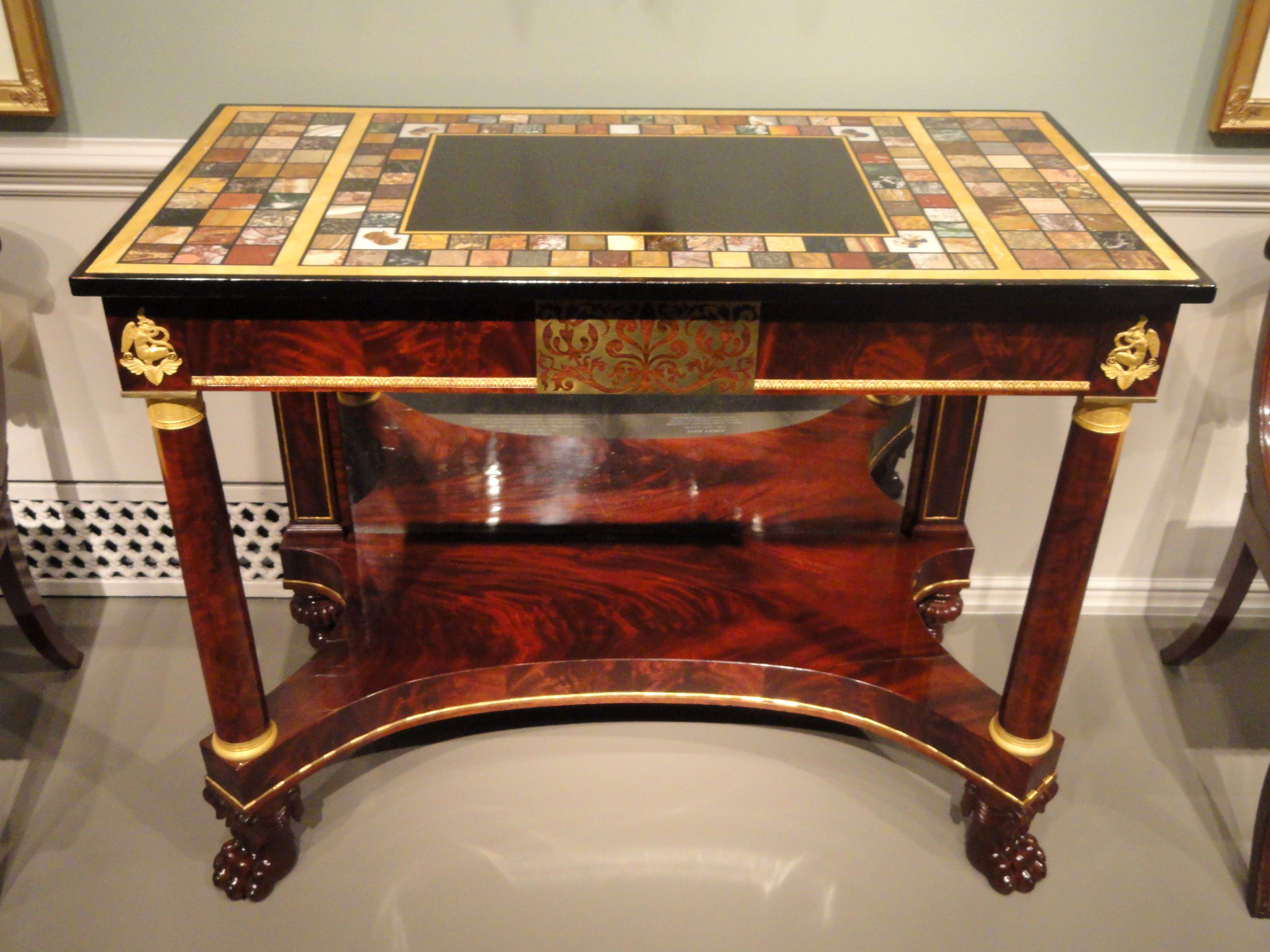
A pier table made in Boston, Massachusetts, between 1815 and 1825.

A pier table is a table designed to be placed against a wall, either between two windows or between two columns. It is also known as a console table (French: console, "support bracket"), although furniture historians differentiate the two types, not always consistently. (Note: Furniture historian Edgar G. Miller argues for a distinction between a console table and a pier table. Pier tables are designed with a flat edge to be against the wall, whereas a console table may have any edge against the wall or be freestanding. Ralph Edwards and John Gloag say console tables should only have legs at the front, and be fixed to the wall, or held in place by gravity.)

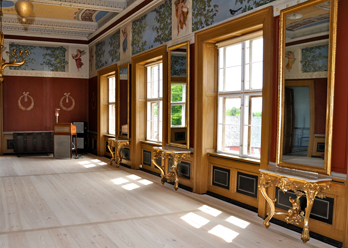
Pier tables (console form) with pier glasses above, Gyldenholm

Above the table there was very often a tall pier glass on the wall, the two typically made to match.

The pier table takes its English name from the "pier wall", the space between windows. The table was developed in continental Europe in the 1500s and 1600s, and became popular in England in the last quarter of the 1600s. The pier table became known in North America in the mid-1700s, and was a popular item into the mid to late 1800s. It was common for the space between the rear legs of the pier table to contain a mirror to help hide the wall. Later pier tables were designed to stand in any niche in a room.

The pier table may often be semicircular, the flat edge against the wall. Pier tables from later periods are often large and quite ornate. Well-known designers such as Duncan Phyfe, Robert Adam, George Hepplewhite, and Thomas Sheraton all designed and manufactured notable examples of pier tables.

Over time, the pier table evolved into the sideboard.

== Bibliography ==
- Gloag, John, John Gloag's Dictionary of Furniture, 1990, London, Unwin Hyman, ISBN 0044407742
- Hinchman, Mark (2013). The Fairchild Books Dictionary of Interior Design. New York: Fairchild Books. ISBN 9781609015343.
- Kenny, Peter M.; Brown, Michael K.; Bretter, Frances F.; Thurlow, Matthew A. (2011). Duncan Phyfe: Master Cabinetmaker in New York. New York: Metropolitan Museum of Art. ISBN 9780300155112.
- Marshall, Patricia Phillips; Leimenstoll, Jo Ramsay (2010). Thomas Day: Master Craftsman and Free Man of Color. Chapel Hill, N.C.: North Carolina Museum of History. ISBN 9780807833414.
- Miller, Edgar George (1937). American Antique Furniture: A Book for Amateurs. New York: Barrows.
