= Trapezophoron =

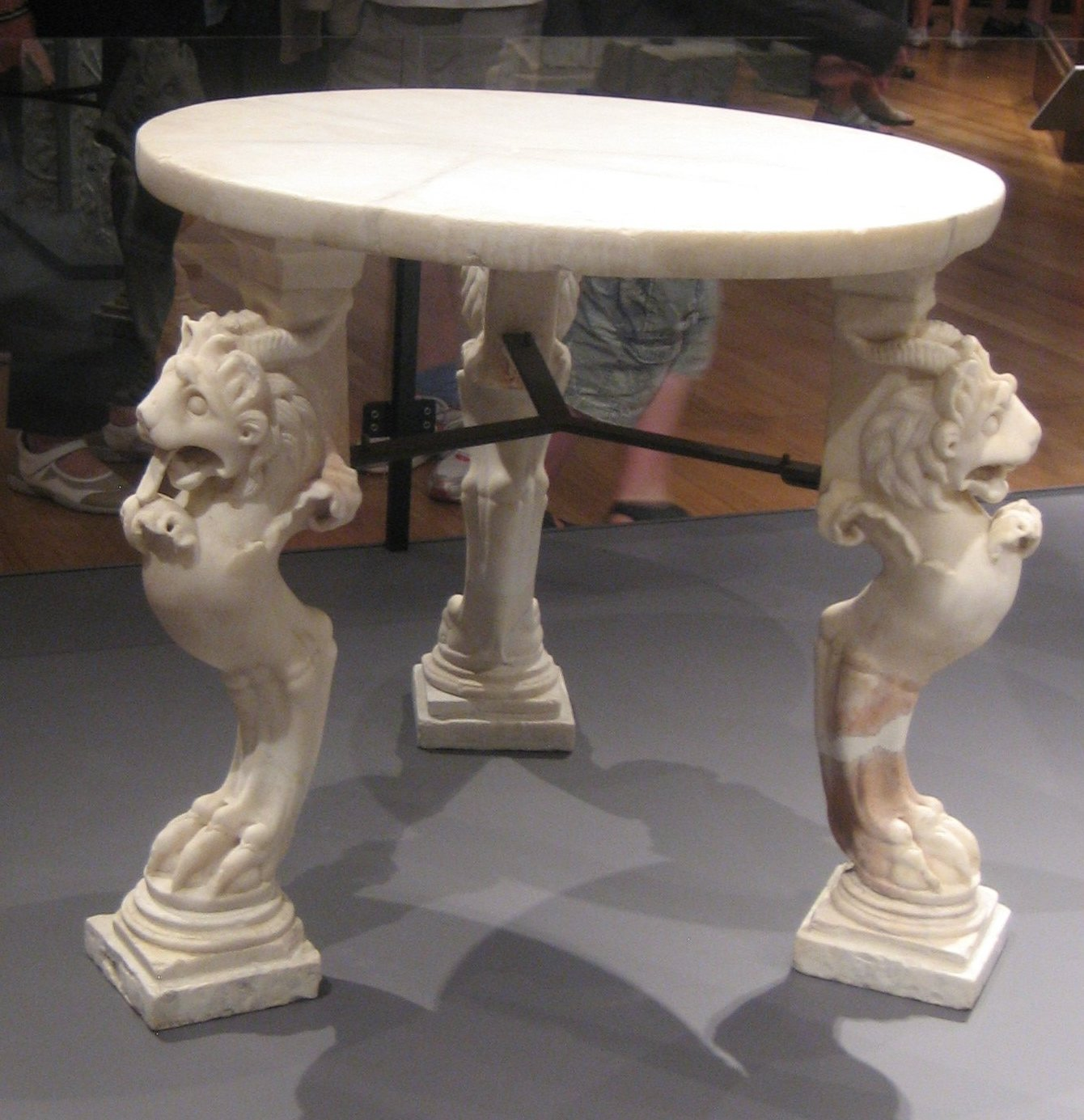
Marble table on trapzophora from ancient Pompeii

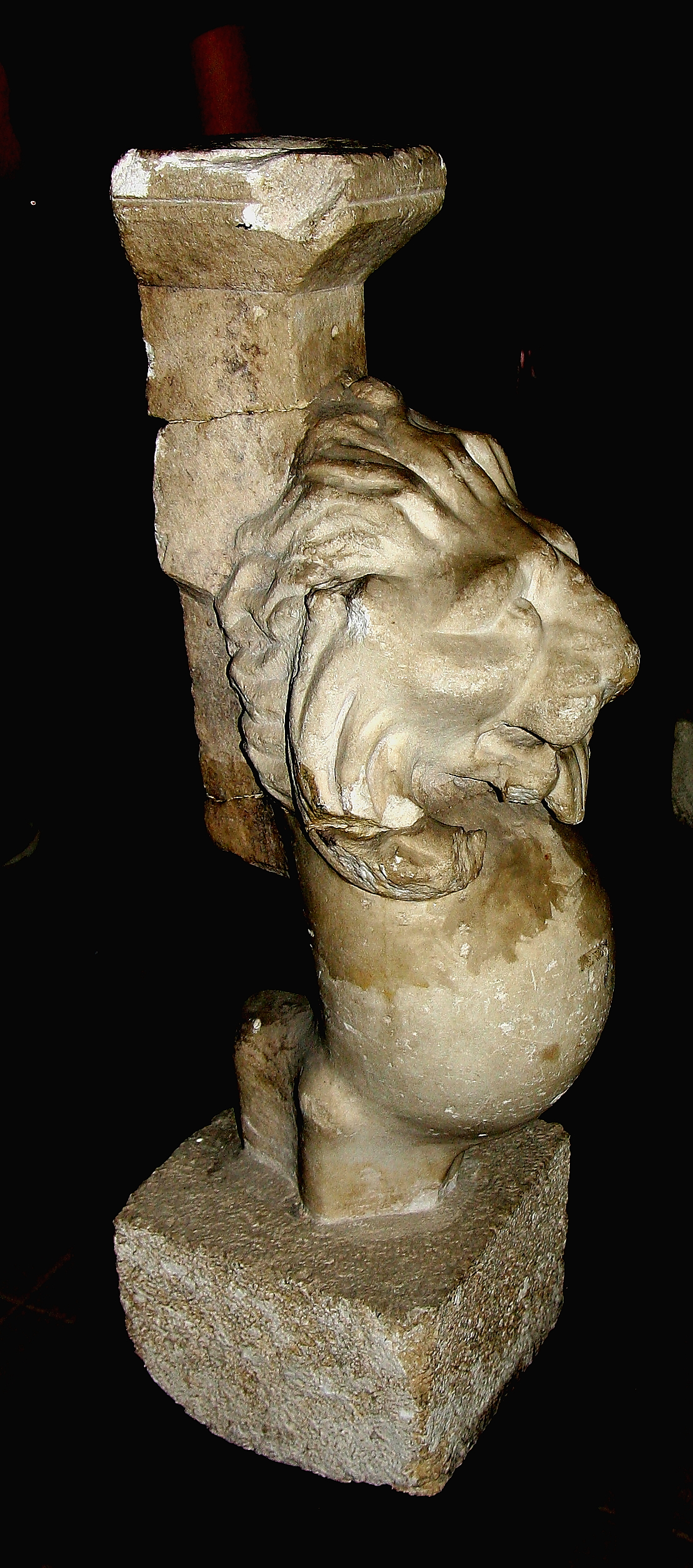
Marble foot

A trapezophore, trapezophorum or trapezophoron (Ancient Greek: Τραπεζοφόρον, romanized: trapezophoron, lit. 'table-bearer') is the leg or pedestal of a small side table, generally in marble, and carved with winged lions or griffins set back to back, each with a single leg, which formed the support of the pedestal on either side. In Pompeii there was a fine example in the house of Cornelius Rufus, which stood behind the impluvium. These side tables were known as mensae vasariae and were used for the display of vases, lamps, and such. Sometimes they were supported on four legs, the example at Pompeii (of which the museums at Naples and Rome contain many varieties) had two supports only, one at each end of the table. The term is also applied to a single leg with lion's head, breast and forepaws, which formed the front support of a throne or chair.
