= Dining table =

Furniture

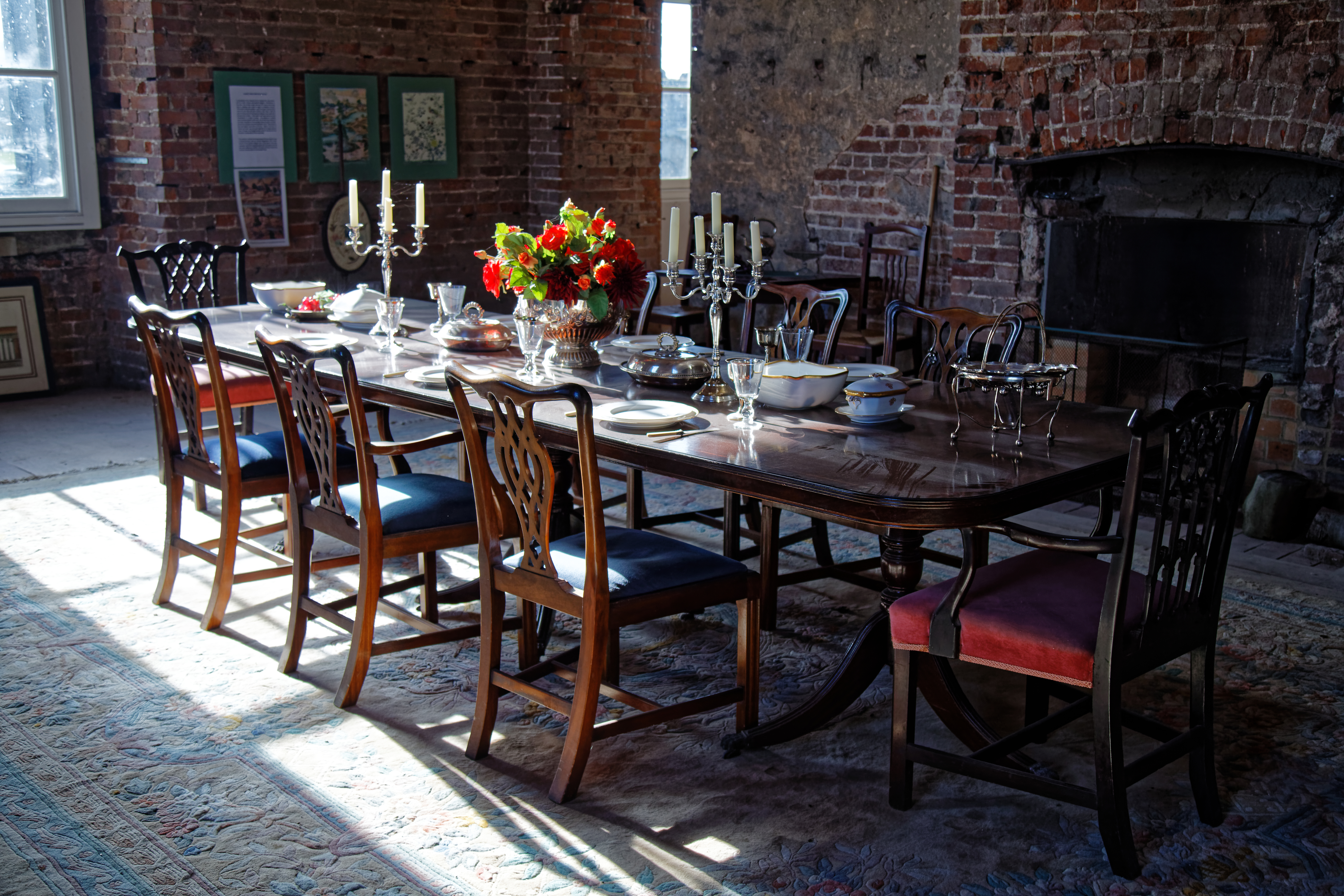

A dining table is a table designed for people to eat meals together. It typically accommodates multiple individuals and serves as a focal point for shared dining. While the term often describes a table placed in a dedicated dining room for formal or main meals (particularly in American English), dining tables are also common in kitchens or open-plan living areas. The term dinner table is frequently used as a synonym, especially with the table used for the day's main meal, and can sometimes refer to the meal occasion itself.

== History ==
In Ancient Egypt, the dining tables were small and low (at most for two participants, usually sitting on the ground) of a single-legged design that Romans would later call monopodium. Alternatively, similar tables were used to serve the food, while the meal participants were sitting in chairs nearby.

Ancient Greeks slowly acquired, probably from further East, a habit of reclining on the couches during the meals. A small table, slightly lower than the couch, was placed next to it and intended for a single participant. A separate table on the side was used to hold the food for serving. For drinking at the symposia, mensa delphica tables were also used with the central stem splitting into three legs often decorated with animal paws.

An Ancient Roman dining arrangement was a triclinium, with the central table, usually a small round monopodium, surrounded by couches on three sides. In the late antiquity, c. 4 AD, the triclinium was being replaced by stibadium, a semi-circular couch wrapping the shared table.

The trestle table that can be easily disassembled for storage became popular in the Middle Ages, and was later replaced by the refectory table, a long and narrow table featuring diners on one side, with the other left free for the servers. The servants needed unimpeded access to the table in order to preserve the fancy and expensive tablecloths (in these times, for example, the wine was poured on the sideboard and served already in goblets). While the trestle tables with detachable boards are mostly gone, their design is still reflected in the use of the word "board" to designate a meal (cf. Room and board).

During the Renaissance in Italy, the simple trestles that supported tables gradually evolved into more elegant, carved supports. Overtime, and again in Italy, the two supports at the ends of the table were replaced by four legs, so that people could also be seated along the narrow sides of the table. As dining tables became more common among populations with smaller homes, extendable tables similar to modern ones emerged, featuring draw-leaves (primitive trestle tables were always easy to lengthen by simply adding more trestles and boards). The gateleg table first appeared in England during the Restoration.

The hutch table was an early piece of multifunctional furniture. This chair-table combined a table with a chest and settle.

Round tables have often symbolized equality, from the legends of King Arthur to Cardinal Mazarin, who seated his subordinates at a round table without regard to title (though he himself dined at a small table nearby). They became widespread in France at the end of the reign of Louis XIV. The problem of the limited number of seats at a standard round table was solved in 1764 by the Frenchman Antoine-Joseph Loriot, who invented the table with an expandable round tabletop popular at the turn of the 20th century.

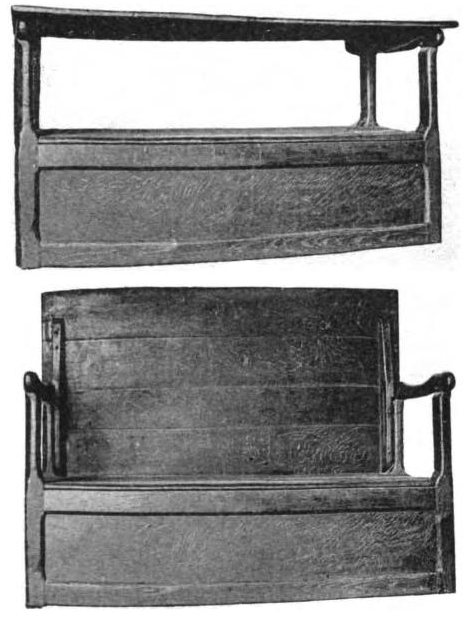
Hutch table configured as a table (top) and settle (bottom)

=== 20th century ===
Habegger and Osman highlight several 20th-century designs as innovative dining tables (out of 107 total tables, including conference tables, listed in their catalog):

- 1928: The LC/6 table – the tabletop floats above its supporting frame of oval-shaped metal parts (Le Corbusier);
- 1933: The 4-905 multi-section table (A. Aalto) – allows for the reconfiguration of its four sections (two semi-circular and two rectangular), which stand on bent legs;
- 1954: The X800 fan-legged table – A. Aalto sawed the end of each bent leg into five parts and fastened the resulting fan to the tabletop;
- 1968: The "Superellipse" table, which combines the advantages of rectangular and round tabletops. Designers B. Mathsson and P. Hein borrowed the superelliptical shape from the outline of the traffic circle at Sergels torg square in Stockholm (also designed by P. Hein);
- 1972: The segmented base table (Charles and Ray Eames). The table's modular base allows for the creation of a long, elliptical-topped table suitable for conferences;
- 1975: A free-form dining table (by Jerryll Habegger) features tabletops of various sizes for different items; diners can face in different directions;
- 1975: The "Dinnerelement" dining table (J. C. Colombo). This mobile table for six included devices for cooling and heating food and storage for cutlery;
- 1978: The "Inca" dining table by designer A. Mangiarotti, a development of his previous "Eros" table – flat surfaces and their supporting parts connect at a single point, held together only by their own weight;
- 1980: The 2R dining table (designers Leif Eric Rasmunssen and Henrik Rolff). The table's additional sections attach without tools; the bent metal fasteners are stored in the hollow table pedestal;
- 1983: A table by Andrew Belschner, whose tabletop construction allows for on-site repairs using only sandpaper and furniture polish.

M. Stimpson highlights the following dining tables as "reliable classics" between 1855 and 1985:

- 1920s: The Parsons table. Its minimalist design is attributed both to J. M. Frank, who taught at the Paris branch of the Parsons School of Design, and to Russian constructivists. The table is distinguished by its rectangular form, legs with a square cross-section, and a top with no overhang that is equal in thickness to the legs;
- 1957: The "Tulip" pedestal table by E. Saarinen. Part of the set that included the "Tulip chair", this single-pedestal furniture revolutionized modern design by eliminating the "slum of legs" under the table. Saarinen had been working on the concept since the 1940s.
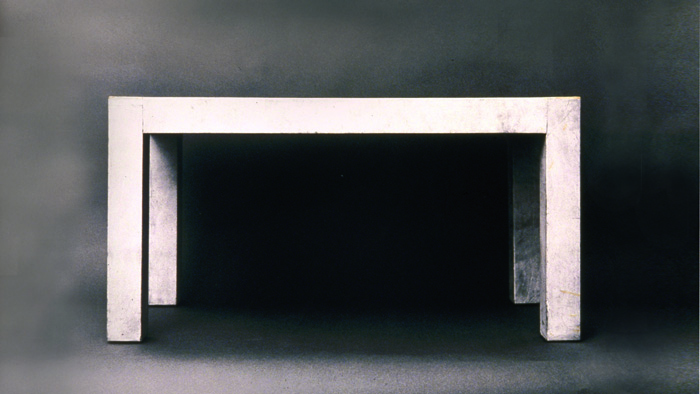
Parsons table

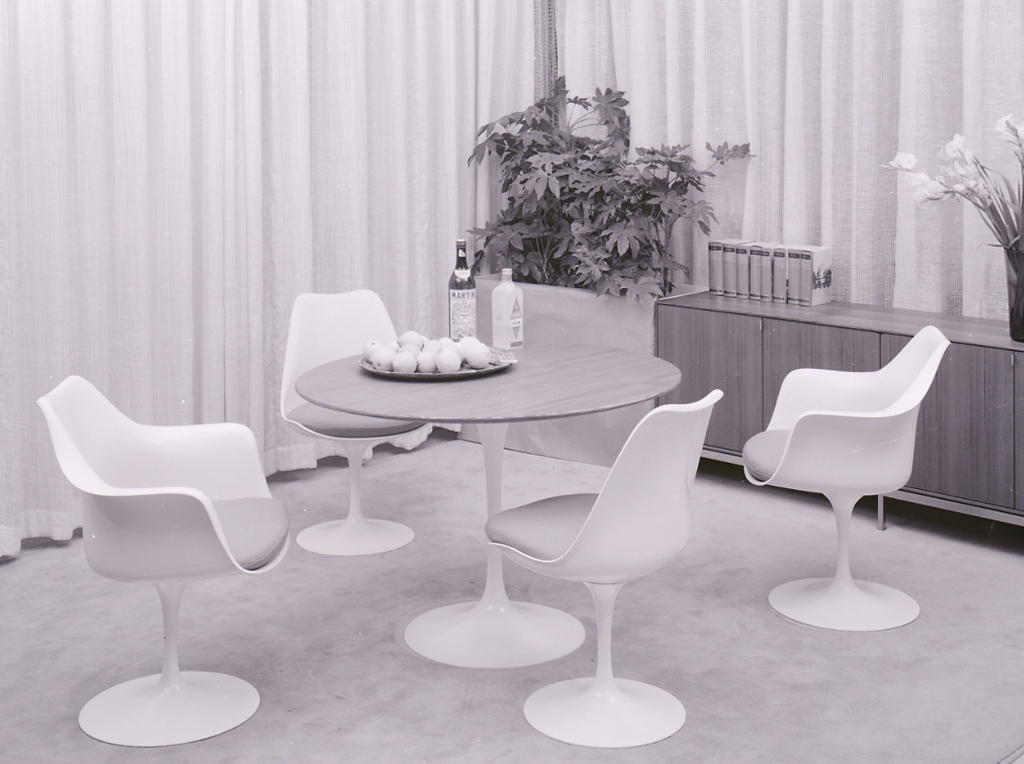
Tulip furniture

== Construction ==
A dining table consists of two main parts: the tabletop and the undercarriage (base). The base can be a central pedestal or, more commonly, a set of legs. The legs are often connected by rails or aprons for stability, and sometimes further reinforced by stretchers that connect the legs to each other.

Tables can be classified by their construction:

- Non-extendable: A table with a solid, single-piece tabletop.
- Extendable: A table whose tabletop can be decreased in size when a smaller table will suffice. Common mechanisms include:
  - Draw-leaf: Leaves are pulled out from under the main tabletop at either end.
  - Drop-leaf: Hinged sections of the tabletop hang vertically at the sides and can be raised and supported by a bracket or leg (such as on a gateleg table).
  - Extension table: The tabletop splits in the middle, and separate leaves are inserted into the gap ("extra leaf") or unfolded from beneath ("butterfly extension").
- Folding: A table designed to be folded for storage, such as a card table or banquet table.
- Flip-top: The surface area can be halved by folding the hinged tabletop.
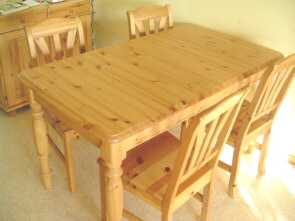
Non-extendable dining table and chairs

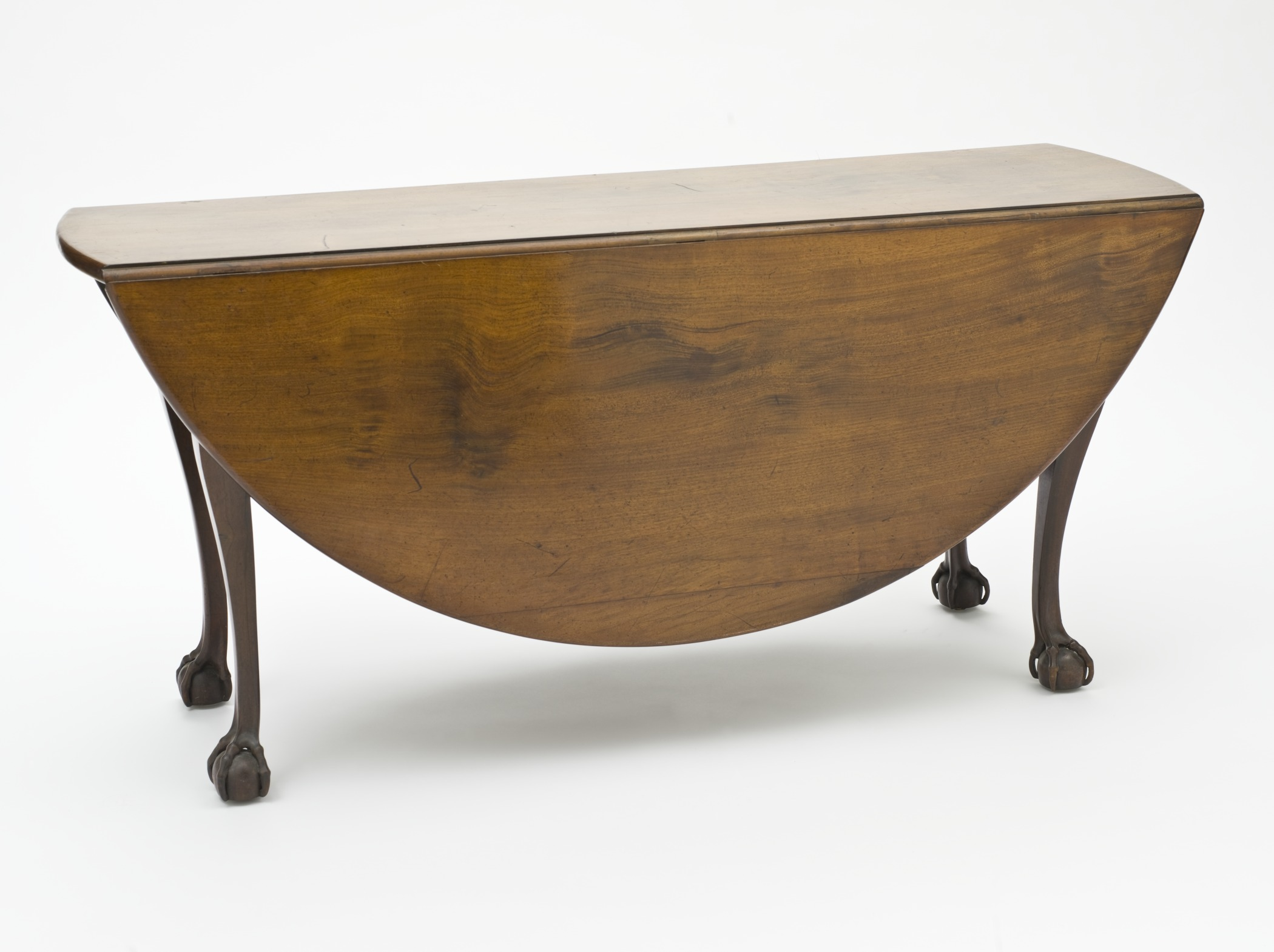
Drop-leaf table

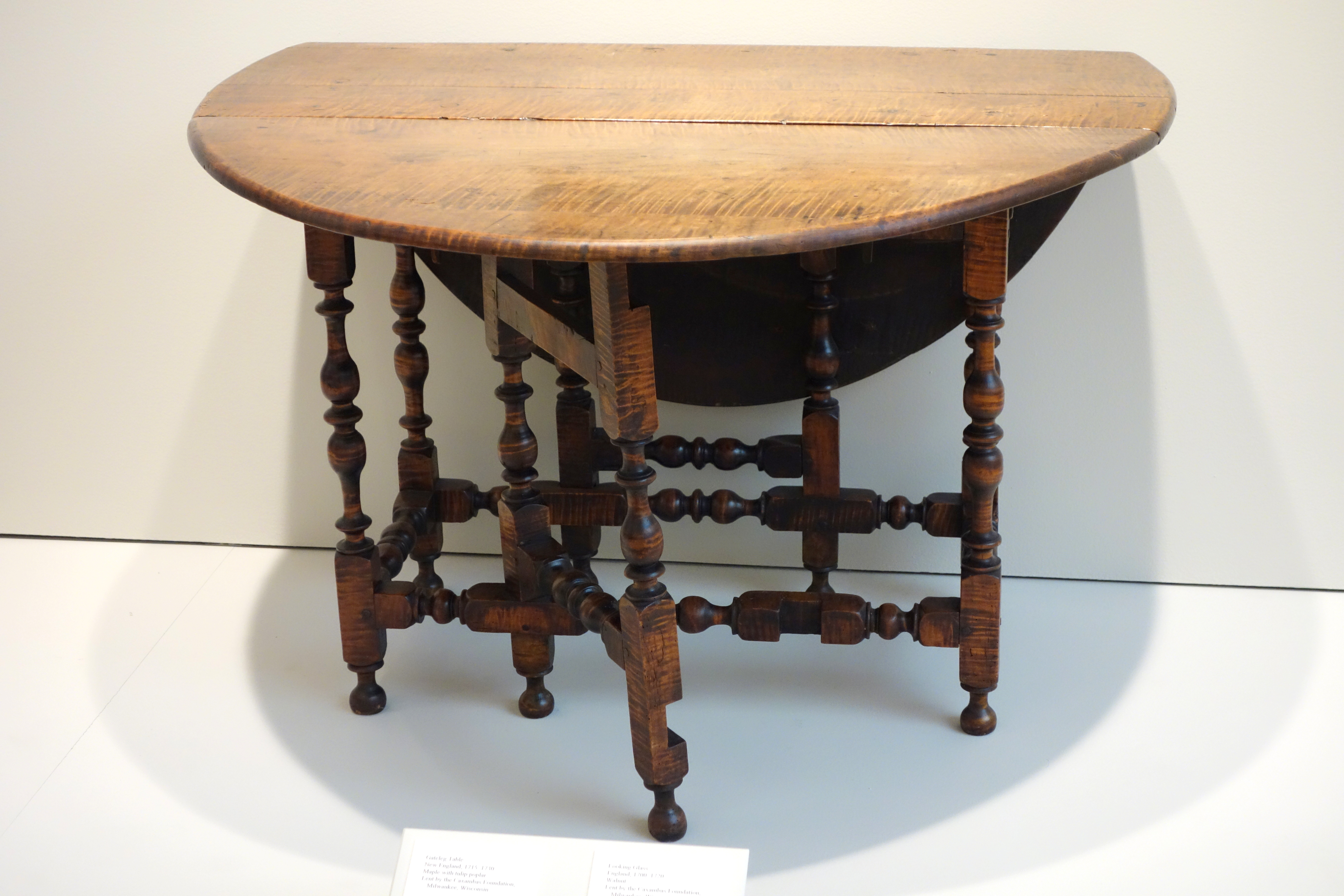
Gateleg table half-folded

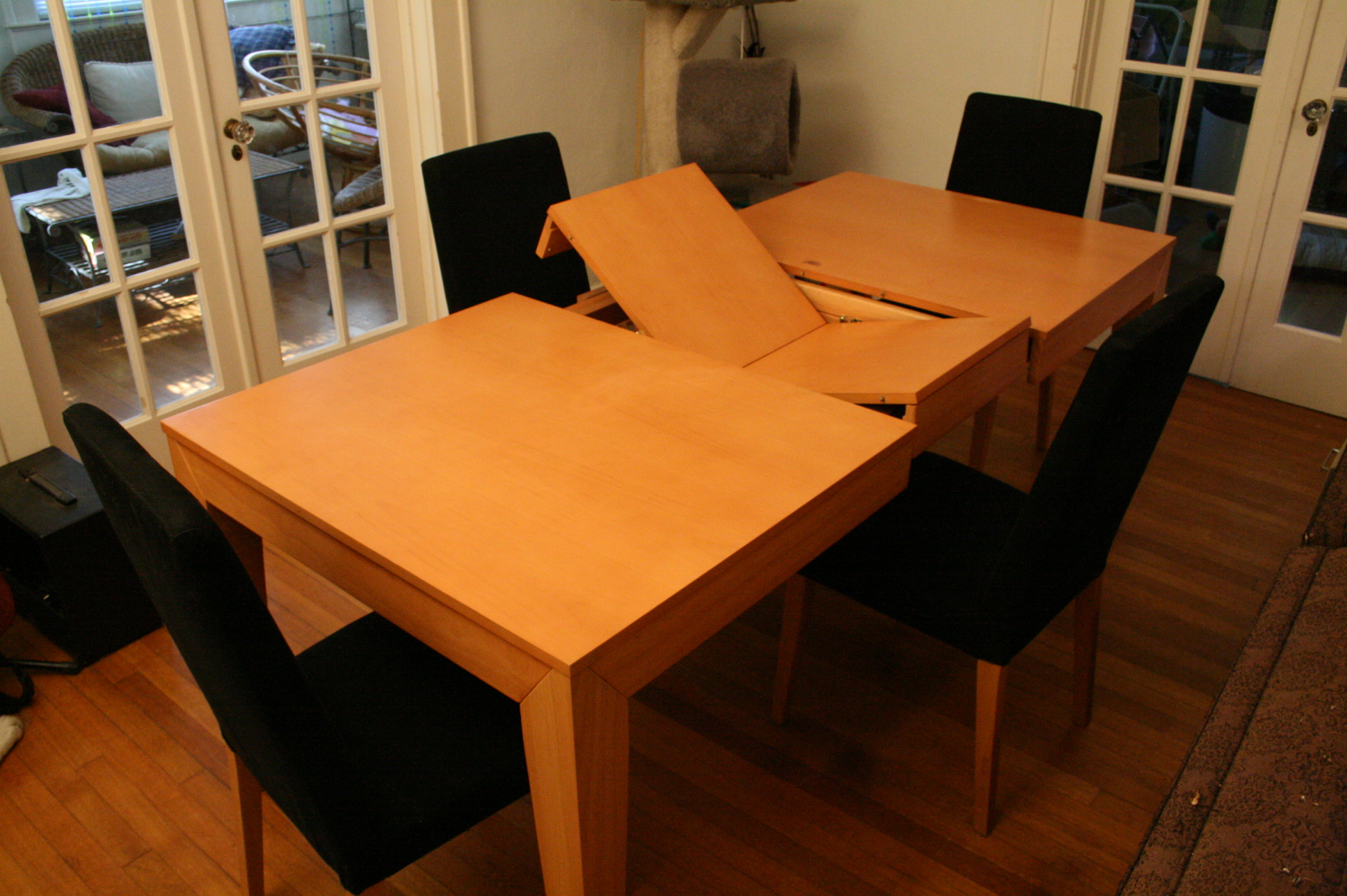
Butterfly extension

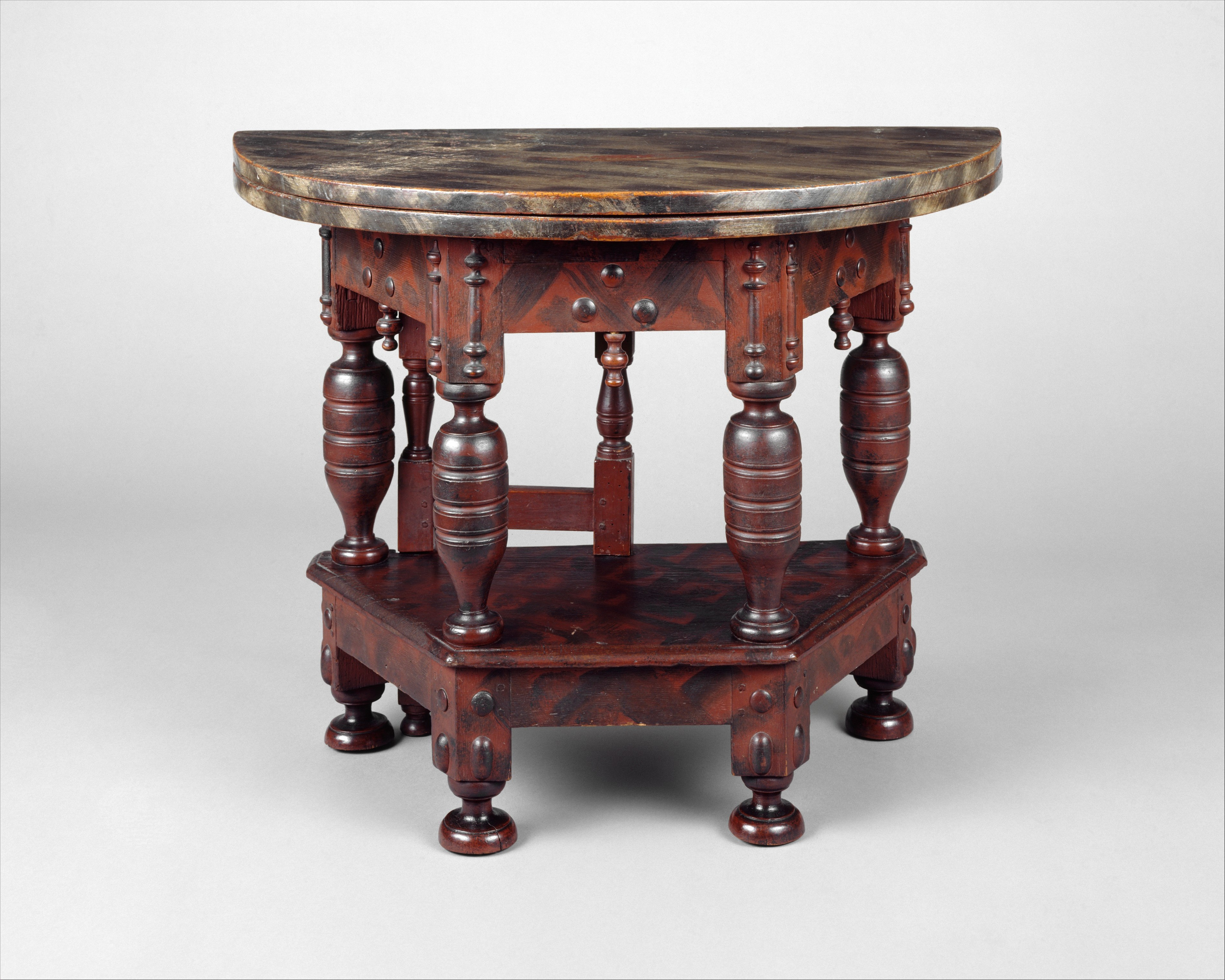
Flip-top round gateleg table

=== Dimensions ===
The standard height for a dining table is typically between 29 and 30 in (74 and 76 cm). To comfortably seat someone, a space of about 24 in (61 cm) in width is recommended, with additional 8 in (20 cm) in the corners.

=== Materials ===
Tabletops for dining tables are made from a wide variety of materials, including:

- Wood
- Wood laminate
- Metal
- Plastic
- Glass

== Non-Western ==
=== Japan ===
The form of a Japanese dining table in the late 19th and 20th centuries went through two major changes. The older tradition had each diner served with their own box, hakozen. This low (20 cm) box was used for storage of the personal utensils and, when turned over during the meal, formed a small (30 cm by 30 cm) individual table. Early in the 20th century, a chabudai (lit. 'tea table') became popular, at first in the white-collar families, but eventually becoming widespread in the society. The second half of the 20th century saw yet another transition, to western-style tables, likely spurred by the Japan Housing Corporation's introduction of three-room apartments with dedicated dining/kitchen rooms.

=== China ===
Until the 10th century AD and the mass introduction of chairs, the dining tables in China were low to match the mats and platforms used for sitting. The switch to chair-level living caused, among other things, an introduction of entirely new furniture. The use of the old low tables still continued through placing them up on a bed or a kang bed-stove, hence they became known as kang tables (Chinese: 炕桌). Kang tables are usually elongated, often highly decorated and might have removable legs for easier storage or extension legs so they can be converted to standalone high tables.

The square tables (called eight immortals tables, Chinese: 八仙桌) have a long history in China (at least since Western Zhou in the 8th century BC) and remain an important piece of furniture in modern Chinese homes. Square tables were originally low, with the tall ones appearing during the Tang dynasty for food preparation. At first, the transition to chair-level living did not affect dining tables, with diners sitting on the benches and in chairs around large low tables. Common use of high tables for dining arrived during the Song dynasty.

== In culture ==
For many centuries, the dining table has been a place for the regular gathering of groups of people (like family members or monks in a monastery); eating alone is uncomfortable. As late as the 1940s, American sociologists noted that a family spent most of their time in the dining and living rooms, and highlighted the important role of shared meals in family discussions and in passing culture from parents to children. If the dining room is considered to be the stage for daily performance of family drama, then the dining table is "the most important prop".

With the advent of television, the role of the dining table in family life diminished. By the mid-20th century in the U.S., informal family gatherings began to take place around the television in the living room. The dining table came to be used mainly for a few formal occasions, and its previous role was largely taken over by the coffee table. In the late 20th and early 21st centuries, popular television programs about cooking led to a revival of interest in entertaining guests at the dining table.

Since at least the Middle Ages, the design and decoration of the dining table have emphasized the hierarchy and status of diners. In Northern European castles, the table for the feudal lords, their children, and other honored persons was located on a dais at the end of the hall furthest from the doors. The tables for other participants in the meal were arranged along the length of the hall at a right angle to the head table.

== See also ==
- Kitchen table

== Sources ==
- Bossard, James H. S. (1943). "Family Table Talk—An Area for Sociological Study" (PDF). American Sociological Review: 295–301. doi:10.2307/2085083. JSTOR 2085083. Archived from the original (PDF) on 12 August 2017.
- Brown, Peter (2001). "Dining by design". The Meal: Proceedings of the Oxford Symposium on Food and Cookery. Oxford Symposium. pp. 58–65. ISBN 978-1-903018-24-8.
- DK (2012-04-02). Step-by-Step Home Design and Decorating. Penguin. ISBN 978-1-4654-0089-5.
- Habegger, Jerryll; Osman, Joseph H. (2005). Sourcebook of Modern Furniture. W. W. Norton & Company. ISBN 978-0-393-73170-5.
- Handler, Sarah (2002a). "11. On a New World Arose: A Kang Table". Austere Luminosity of Chinese Classical Furniture. Berkeley: University of California Press. pp. 161–179. doi:10.1525/9780520353336-014.
- Handler, Sarah (2002b). "12. A Square Table Where the Immortals Dine". Austere Luminosity of Chinese Classical Furniture. Berkeley: University of California Press. pp. 180–202. doi:10.1525/9870520353336-015 (inactive 6 November 2025). ISBN 978-0-520-35333-6.
- Lukanuski, Mary (1998). "A place at the Counter: The Onus of Oneness". Eating Culture. SUNY Press. pp. 112–120. ISBN 978-0-7914-3859-6.
- Niblack, E. M. (July 1918). "Antique Furniture in American Homes. IX. The Evolution of the Dining Table". Good Furniture & Decoration. National Trade Journals: 18–26.
- Postell, Jim (2012). Furniture Design. Hoboken, New Jersey: John Wiley & Sons. ISBN 978-1-118-09078-7.
- Snodgrass, Mary Ellen (2004). "Tables". Encyclopedia of Kitchen History. Routledge. pp. 977–981. ISBN 978-1-135-45572-9.
- Stimpson, Miriam (1987). Modern Furniture Classics. Whitney Library of Design. ISBN 0823073769.
- Tadashi, Inohe (1993). "Changes in Family Relations Reflected in the Dining Table: From the Perspective of "The Family Theater Theory"". Japanstudien. 4 (1): 139–153. doi:10.1080/09386491.1993.11827040. ISSN 0938-6491.
- Vroom, Joanita (2007). "The Archaeology Of Late Antique Dining Habits In The Eastern Mediterranean: A Preliminary Study Of The Evidence". Late Antique Archaeology. 5 (1): 311–361. doi:10.1163/22134522-90000113. ISSN 1570-6893.
