= Sun Fast 3600 =

Sailboat class

Development
- Designer: Daniel Andrieu
- Location: France
- Year: 2012
- Builder: Jeanneau
- Role: Racer-Cruiser
- Name: Sun Fast 3600

Boat
- Displacement: 10,913 lb (4,950 kg)
- Draft: 7.00 ft (2.13 m)

Hull
- Type: monohull
- Construction: fiberglass
- LOA: 36.91 ft (11.25 m)
- LWL: 31.17 ft (9.50 m)
- Beam: 11.65 ft (3.55 m)
- Engine: Yanmar 21 hp (16 kW) diesel engine

Hull appendages
- Keel: fin keel with weighted bulb
- Ballast: 4,409 lb (2,000 kg)
- Rudder: dual spade-type rudders

Rig
- Rig type: Bermuda rig
- I foretriangle height: 45.93 ft (14.00 m)
- J foretriangle base: 13.78 ft (4.20 m)
- P mainsail luff: 44.26 ft (13.49 m)
- E mainsail foot: 15.09 ft (4.60 m)

Sails
- Sailplan: fractional rigged sloop
- Mainsail area: 396 sq ft (36.8 m^{2})
- Jib/genoa area: 355 sq ft (33.0 m^{2})
- Spinnaker area: 1,076 sq ft (100.0 m^{2})
- Upwind sail area: 751 sq ft (69.8 m^{2})
- Downwind sail area: 1,473 sq ft (136.8 m^{2})

Racing
- PHRF: 60

The Sun Fast 3600 is a French sailboat that was designed by Daniel Andrieu as an offshore racer-cruiser and first built in 2012.

The design is part of the Sun Fast sailboat range.

Designed for single-handed, double-handed or crew racing, the Sun Fast 3600 was named the "2016 Best Sailboat Under 45 feet" and "2017 - IRC Boat of the Year".

== Production ==
The design was built by Jeanneau in France, starting in 2012, but it is now out of production.

== Design ==
The Sun Fast 3600 is a racing keelboat, built predominantly of infusion molded fiberglass. The sharp-chined hull has a balsa core, while the deck has a foam core. It has a fractional sloop rig, with a bowsprit, a deck-stepped Soromap mast, two sets of swept spreaders and aluminum spars with Dyform rigging. Carbon fiber spars were a factory option. The hull has a plumb stem, an open reverse transom, dual internally mounted spade-type rudders controlled by dual Jefa wheels or dual tillers and a fixed cast iron fin keel with a lead weighted bulb or optional all-lead fin keel. Both keel models displace 10,913 lb (4,950 kg) empty and carry 4,409 lb (2,000 kg) of ballast.

The boat has a draft of 7.00 ft (2.13 m) with the standard keel and 7.16 ft (2.18 m) with the optional lead keel.

The boat is fitted with a Japanese Yanmar diesel engine of 21 hp (16 kW) for docking and maneuvering. The fuel tank holds 20 U.S. gallons (76 L; 17 imp gal) and the fresh water tank has a capacity of 26 U.S. gallons (98 L; 22 imp gal).

The design has sleeping accommodation for six people, with a two straight settee berths in the main cabin around a drop leaf table and two aft cabins, each with two berths. The galley is located on the starboard side just forward of the companionway ladder. The galley is L-shaped and is equipped with a two-burner stove, a refrigerator and a sink. A navigation station is opposite the galley, on the port side. The head is located in the bow and includes a shower. Cabin maximum headroom is 80 in (203 cm).

For sailing downwind the design may be equipped with a symmetrical spinnaker of 1,076 sq ft (100.0 m^{2}).

The design has a hull speed of 7.48 kn (13.85 km/h) and a PHRF handicap of 60.

== Operational history ==
The boat was at one time supported by a class club that organized racing events, the Sun Fast Association.

In a 2015 review for Yachting World, Matthew Sheahan wrote, "overall, what struck me was the ease with which this fractional rig sailplan could be handled. The boat we tested was set up for short-handed racing and as such had a fixed bowsprit to fly asymmetric spinnakers. Those who will go in for fully crewed racing in restricted waters, such as the Solent where sneaking out of the tide is key, could well prefer a conventional spinnaker pole and asymmetric kite. This option comes with a shorter bowsprit from which to fly a Code 0 or heavy airs asymmetric spinnaker."

Herb McCormick wrote a review for Cruising World, stating, "our 2015 Boat of the Year judges, who sailed the boat on Chesapeake Bay last fall, toppled head over heels for it. It didn’t win the top prize in the Cruiser/Racer division (the Salona 44 did), but if this weren't Cruising World, and it had been the Racer/Cruiser class, the outcome would have been different."

In a 2016 Sail Magazine review, Adam Cort wrote, "the boat is no twitchy thoroughbred, but a well-mannered speedster that channels wind energy directly into VMG without any undue dramatics. Beating down the east end of Martha’s Vineyard in moderate seas and 12 to 15 knots of wind the boat quickly dug in, reducing her wetted surface area by lifting the windward portion of that wide, powerful stern out of the water, and began powering forward at just over 6.5 knots."

== See also ==
- List of sailing boat types
