= Folding table =

Portable furniture

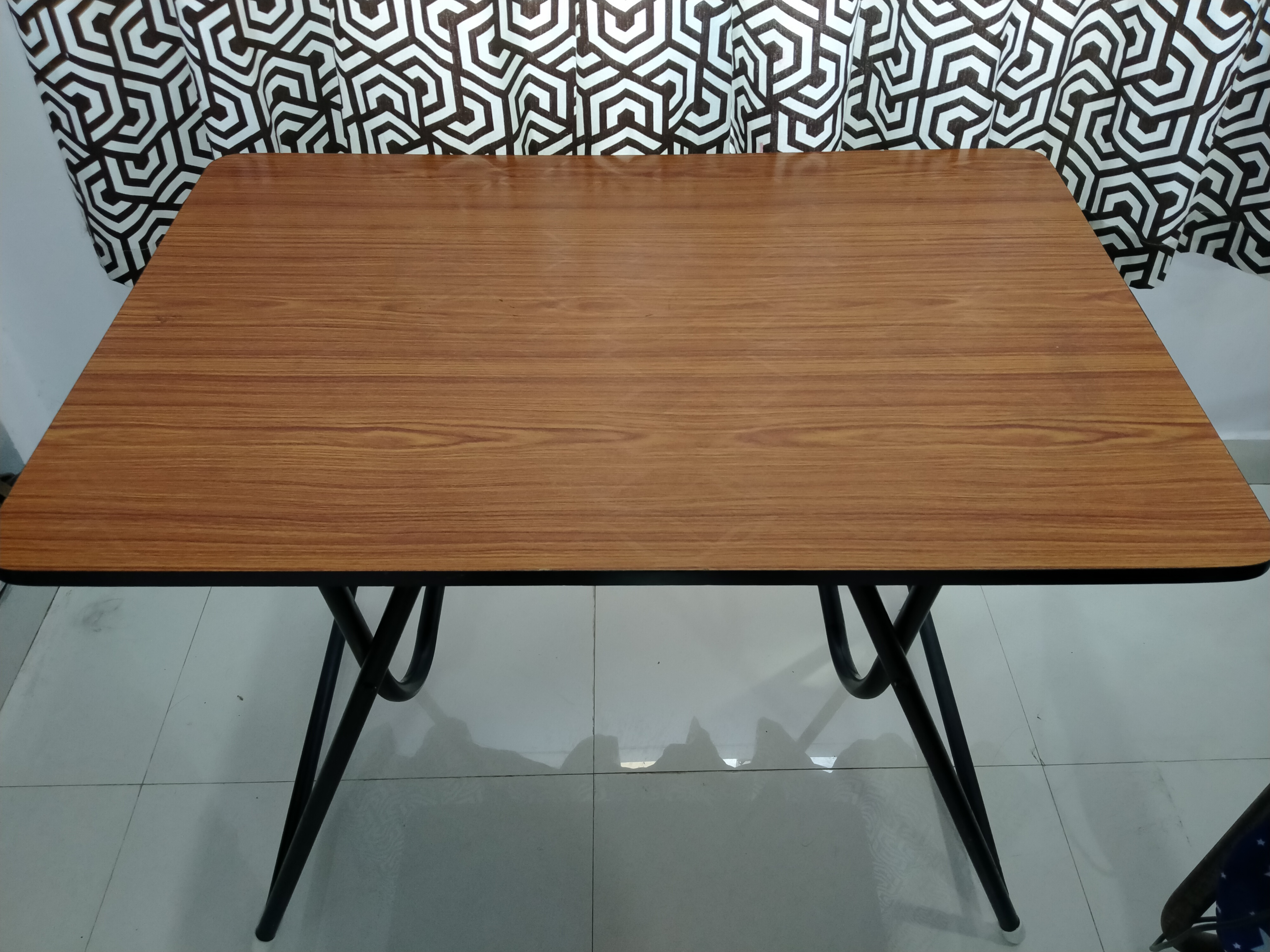
General use Folding Table

A folding table is a type of folding furniture, a table with legs that fold up against the table top. This is intended to make storage more convenient and to make the table more portable. Many folding tables are made of lightweight materials to further increase portability.

== Description ==
Folding tables are produced in many sizes, configurations, and designs. They can be made from plastic, metal, wood, and other materials. Some manufacturers use specialist materials such as engineered wood when producing tables.

=== Folding mechanism ===
There are two main types of folding table. Those that have leaves that fold down such as a Pembroke table, drop-leaf table or gateleg table, and those that fold by having legs that bend on a hinge located at the connection point between the table top and the leg. The leg is designed to fold and fit securely against the underside of the table top, while remaining attached. Because the hinge requires a stable material such as metal for dexterity, some producers use lightweight materials such as aluminium for an increased degree of portability in the folding mechanism.

=== Uses ===
Folding tables are used in homes, schools, churches, and other buildings that have rooms intended for various functions. Folding tables can be used for sit-down activities, and then easily removed and stored out of the way when open space is needed. Wooden folding tables are also sometimes used as weapons in professional wrestling.

== History ==
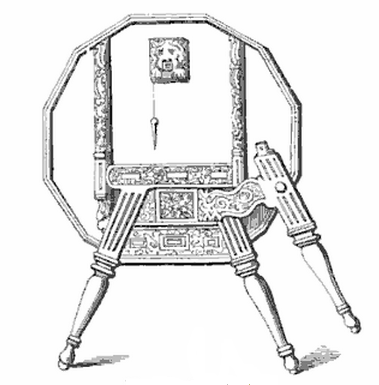
A 16th-century English folding table

The history of the folding table may date back as far as ancient Egypt. By the Colonial and Victorian eras, the tables were common.

During the 20th century, folding tables became an inexpensive item manufactured and sold in large quantities.

In the 1940s, Durham Manufacturing Company was marketing a basic model. In 1951, Boris Cohen and Joseph Pucci patented the first table that could be easily carried around. It was widely used by paper-hangers and handymen, and is fairly indistinguishable from present day aluminum folding tables. In the 1950s and 1960s, Falco and Samsonite tables were popular.

In the 1990s and 2000s, American manufacturer Lifetime Products became the world's largest producer of folding tables.

== Styles ==
=== Card table ===
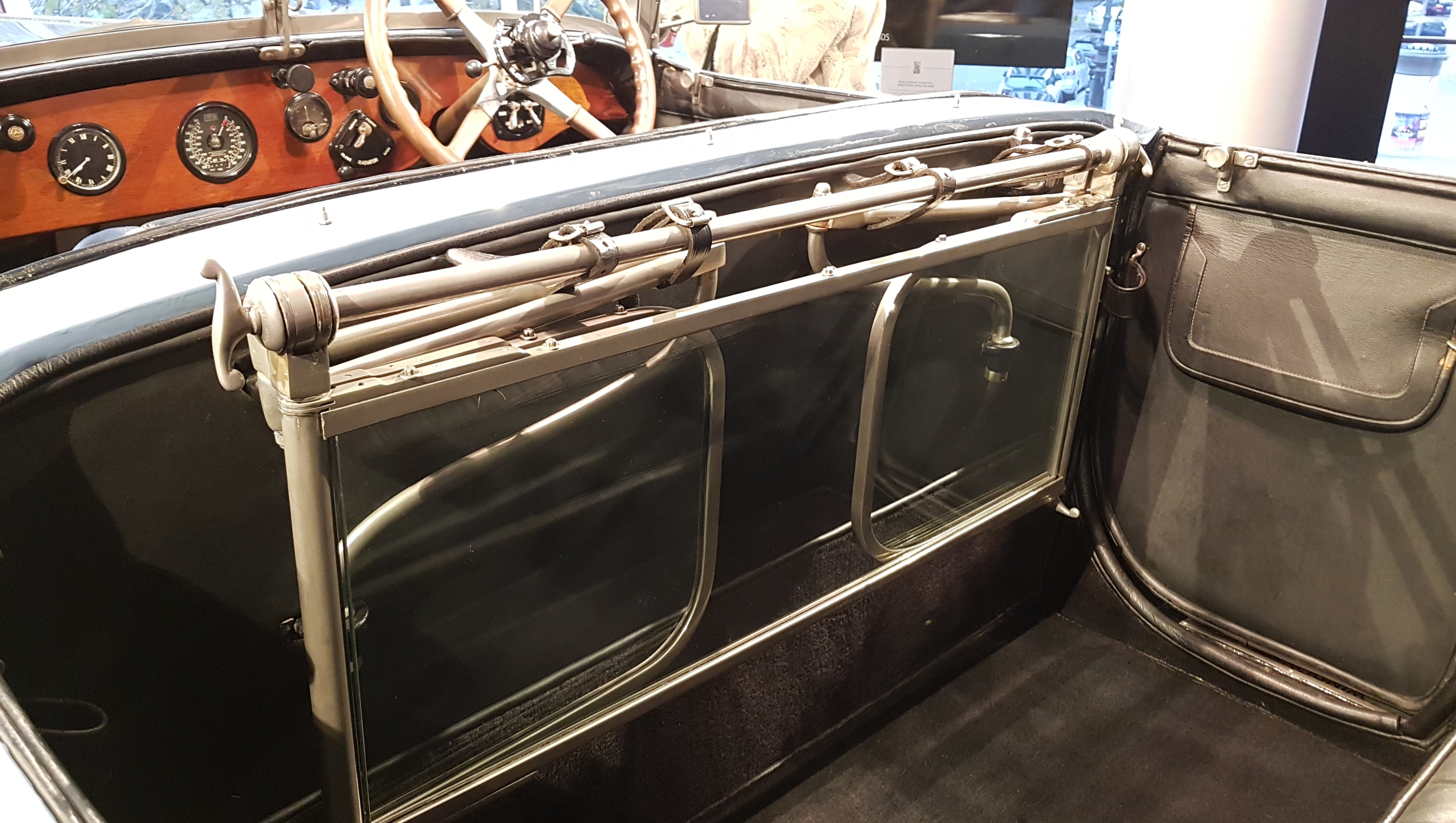
Folding table of Rolls-Royce Phantom I Open Tourer Windovers (1926)

A card table is a square table with legs that fold up individually, with one leg lining each edge. Card tables are traditionally used for playing card games, board games, and other tabletop games. Due to their low cost and small storage size, in the United States they are frequently found in college apartments, or as auxiliary seating for family meals such as Thanksgiving. Many folding card tables are used for specialist games such as contract bridge, Mahjong or poker, as a result there are some folding tables with fabric surfaces such as felt. In the UK, card tables are purpose-designed for cards with a green baize surface and foldaway leaves or legs.

=== General-use table ===
Rectangle, square, and round folding tables are designed for general home and office uses.

=== Banquet table ===
Banquet tables are traditionally used by restaurants and caterers for setting up temporary buffets. They are also popular among retailers and vendors at trade shows for displaying products, and for use as temporary desks.

=== Personal table ===
A personal table, also called a TV tray, is a small table designed to be used by only one person at a time. They are popular for dining while watching television, or for working on small projects. Students often use personal tables for doing homework.

=== Folding picnic table ===
A folding picnic table has built-in seats that fold up along with the legs. They are used commonly in school cafeterias and in the backyards of homes.

=== Ironing board ===
An ironing board is a small, portable, folding table with a heat-resistant top that is used for ironing clothes.

=== Wallpaper table ===
A wallpaper table (or paste or pasting table) is a long, light folding table used by interior decorators. The decorator lays out a strip of wallpaper flat on the table to apply paste so that the wallpaper can then be fixed onto the wall. The table needs to be long to accommodate wallpaper, so other tables typically found in rooms are insufficient, and needs to be light and foldable so that they can be easily transported. Their ease of transportation and assembly means wallpaper tables are sometimes used for other informal purposes such as car boot sales and camping.

== Gallery ==
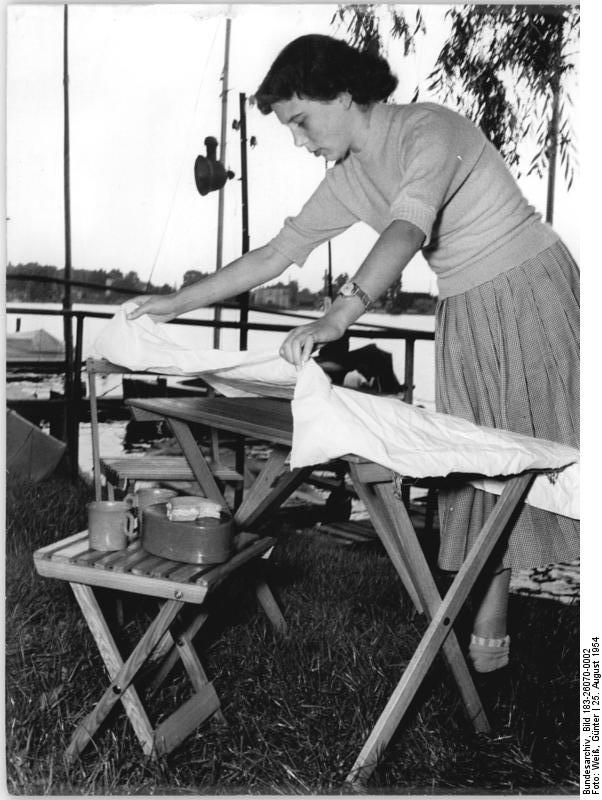
A 1950s folding table

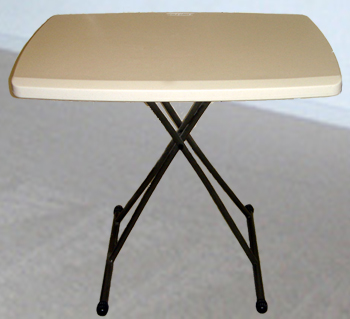
Personal table or TV tray

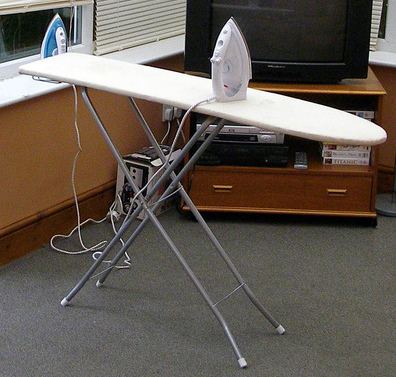
Folding ironing board

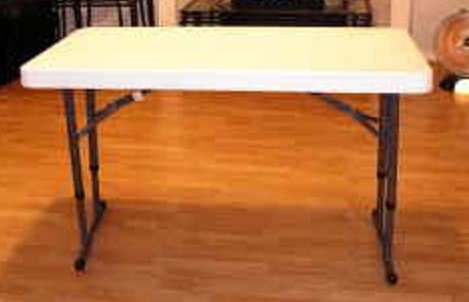
Modern folding table

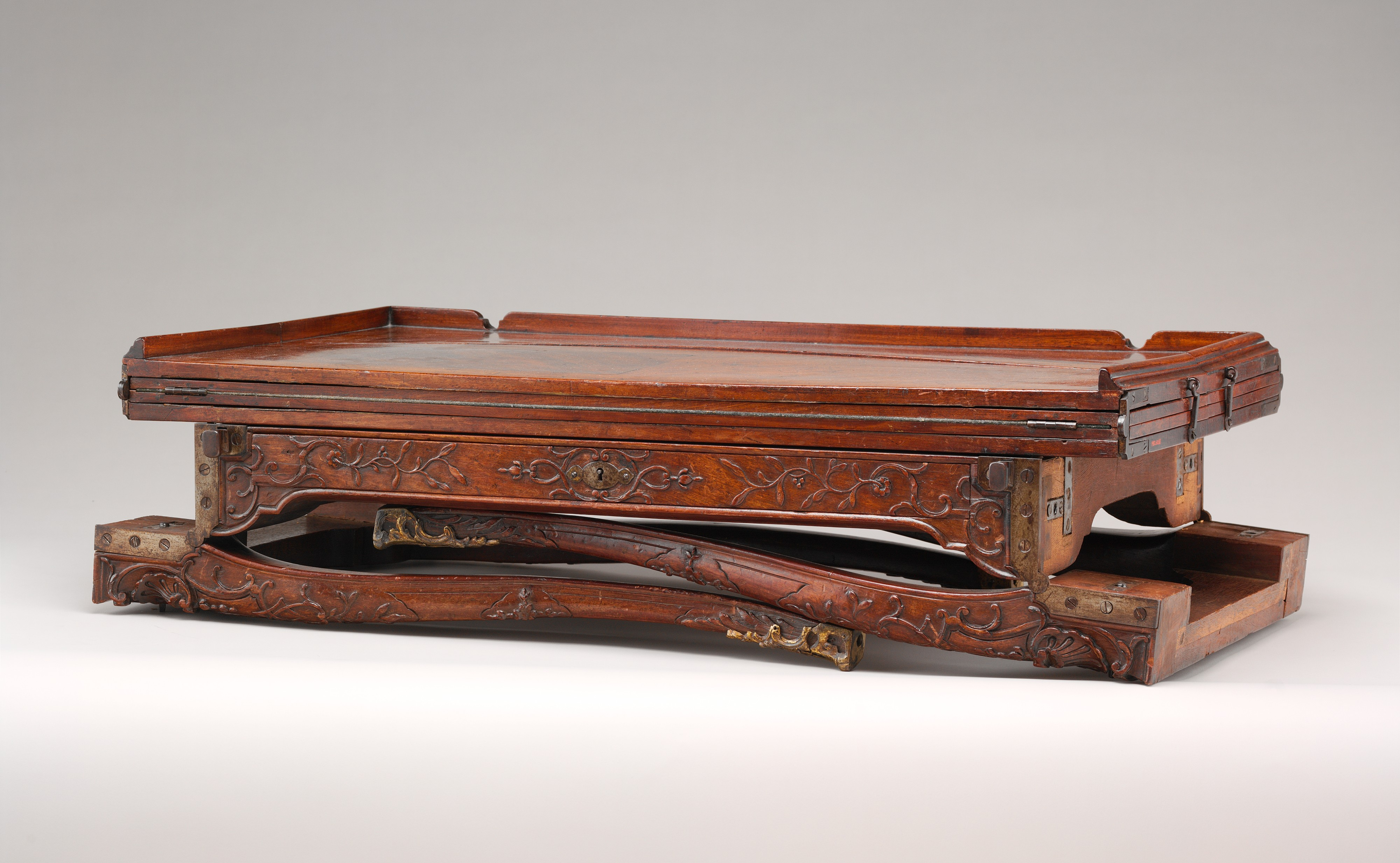
This ca. 1700–1720 table, designed for coach travel, folds out to accommodate six for dinner (with utensil drawer and fiddle rails) and offers felt and leather surfaces for playing cards and writing, respectively.

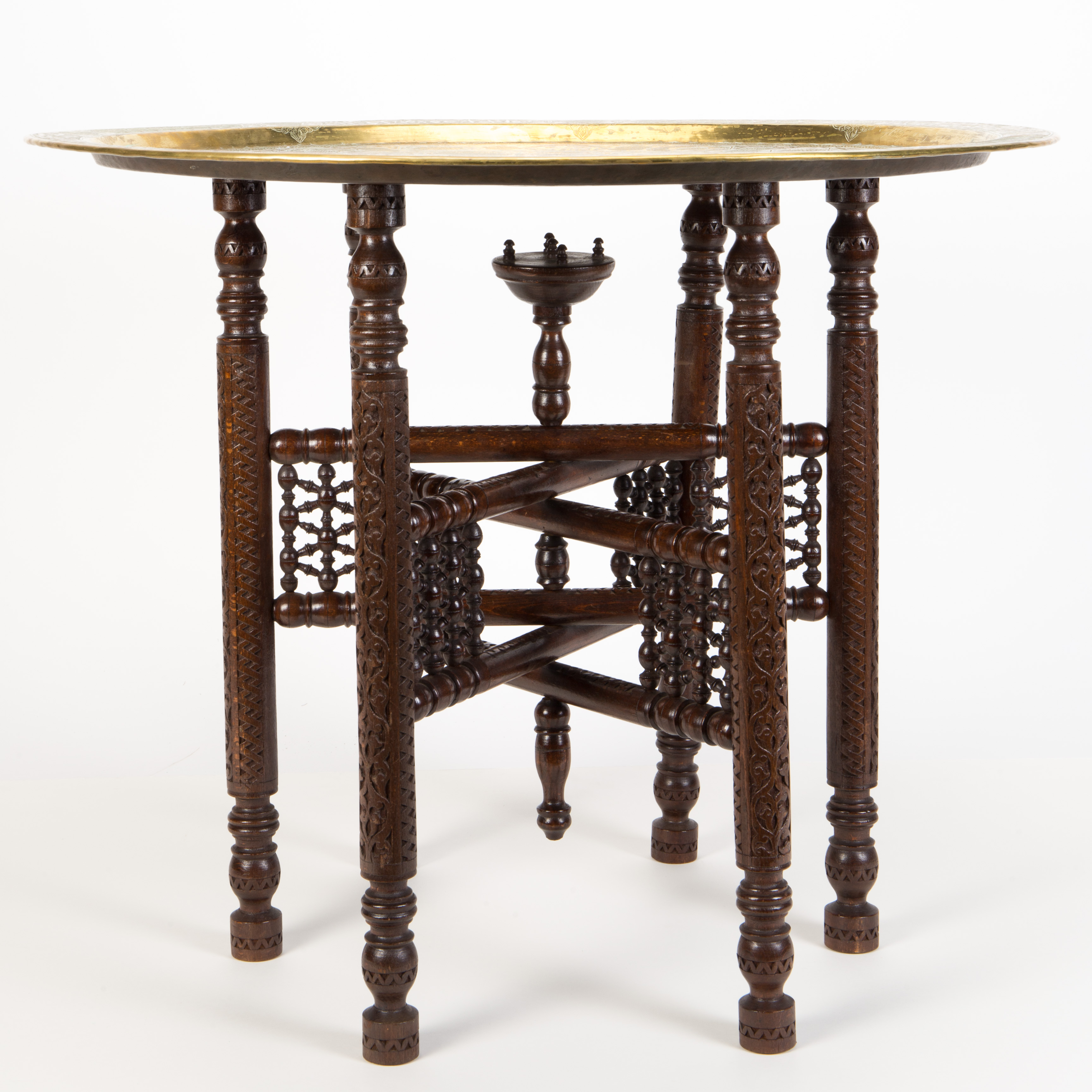
Folding table from Cairo, Egypt, 1915

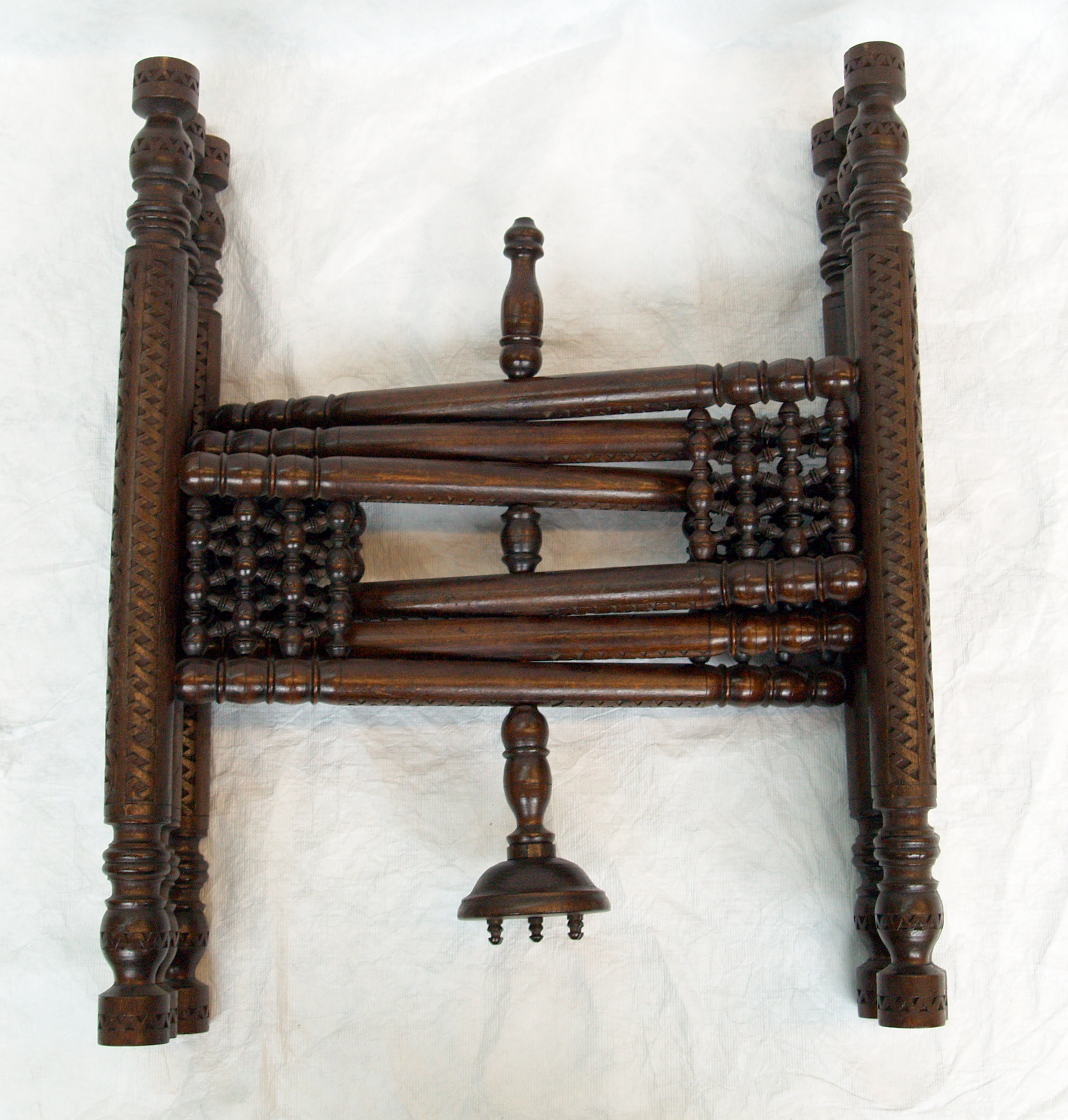
Legs of same table, folded; damascene tray tabletop lifts off

== See also ==
- Chabudai, in Japan case.
- Drop-leaf table, where the top folds down
- Folding chair
- Gateleg table, a drop-leaf table where some of the legs fold inwards as well
- Tip-top table
- Buffalo Bills
