= Drop-leaf table =

Type of folding furniture

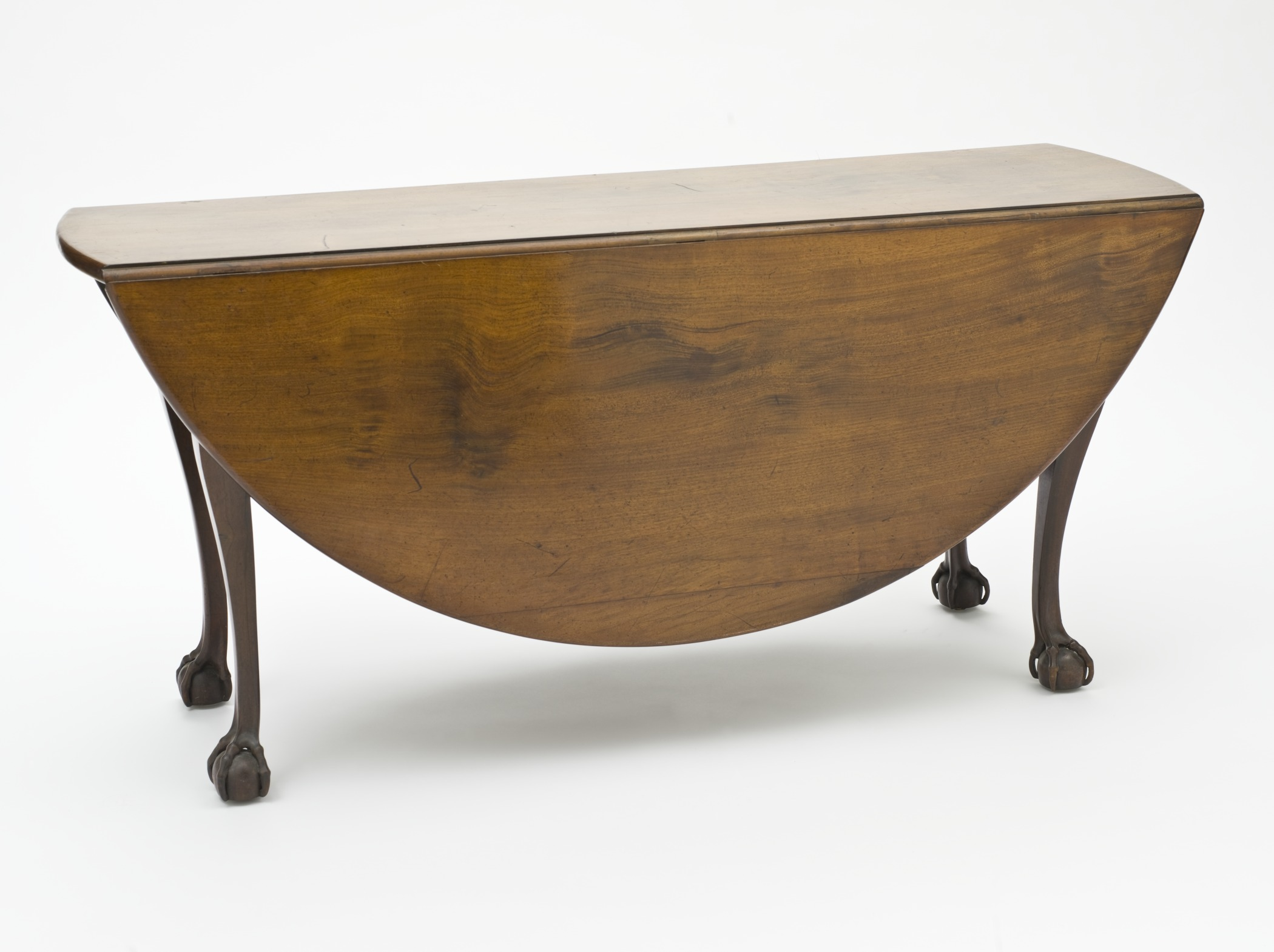
Oval drop-leaf dining table, built 1765–1785, and in the Decorative Arts and Design collection of the Los Angeles County Museum of Art

A drop-leaf table is a table that has a fixed section in the center and a hinged section (leaf) on either side that can be folded down (dropped). If the leaf is supported by a bracket when folded up, the table is simply a drop-leaf table; if the leaf is supported by legs that swing out from the center, it is known as a gateleg table. Depending on the style of drop-leaf or gateleg tables, the leaves vary from coming almost down to the floor to only coming down slightly.

The usual purpose of a drop-leaf table is to save space when the table is not in use. Typical examples of drop-leaf tables are: dining tables, night stands, side tables, coffee tables, and desks. Drop-leaf tables were found mostly in England where they date back to the late sixteenth century; Elizabethan era and Jacobean era examples are still extant.

== See also ==
- Folding table
- Gateleg table
- Pembroke table
- Tip-top table
