= Soban =

Korean small tables for dining

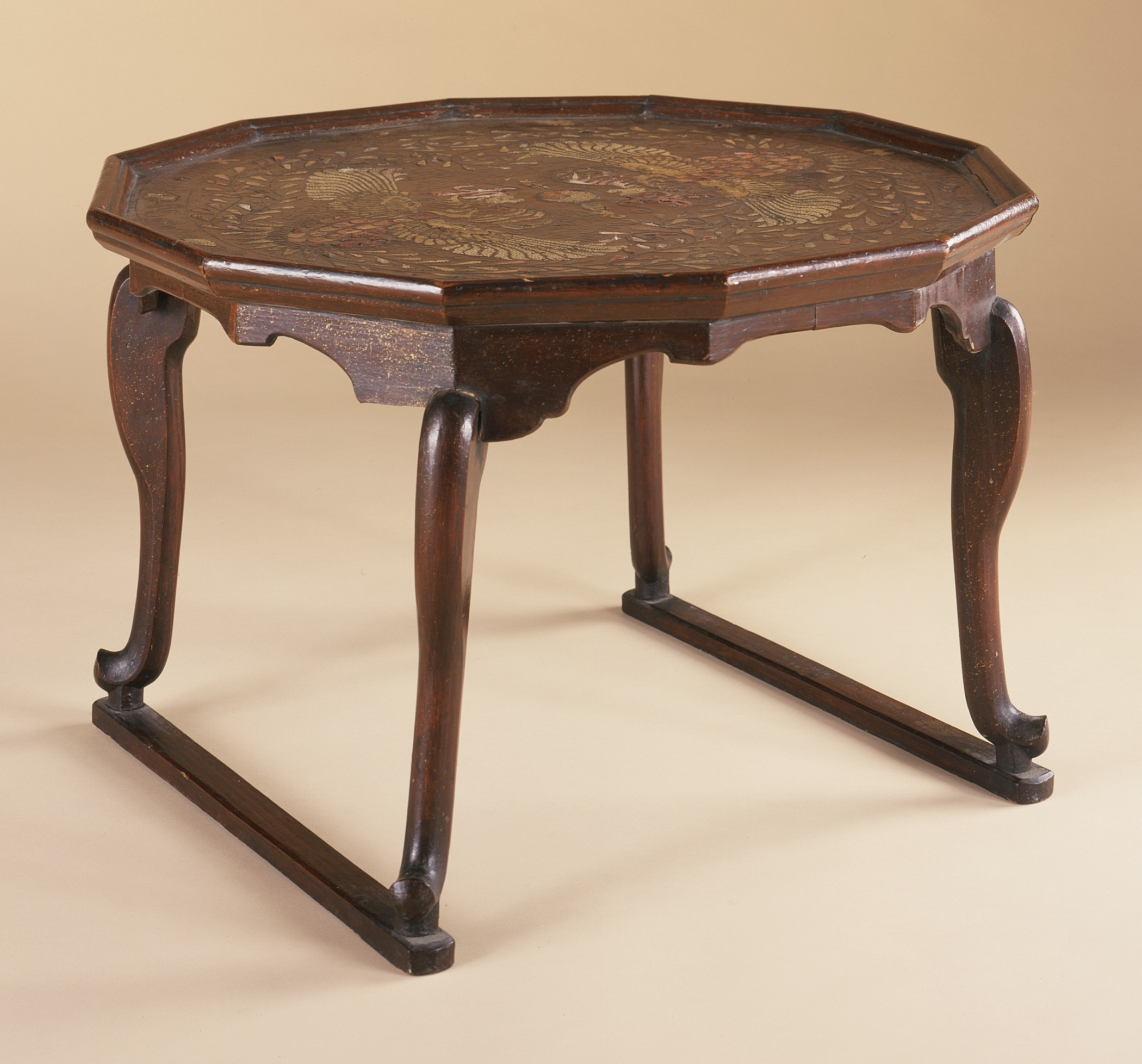
A Joseon-era soban

Soban (Korean: 소반; Hanja: 小盤) are small tray-like tables, usually wooden, used in Korea for carrying food and as individual dining tables. They are generally made of walnut, pine or ginko wood, often sourced from the carpenter's local area. Carvings and murals showing images of soban have been found in tombs dating back to the time of the Goguryeo kingdom. As well as being used for dining, soban were also used for general carrying tasks, as writing desks and as small altars for prayers or for burning incense.

Soban are generally fairly small, due to the historical custom of family members and guests each having their own individual table. The standard dimensions are around 30 by 50 cm (12 by 20 in), with the legs standing about 30 cm (12 in) high. The table is placed on the floor, and used from a seated position.

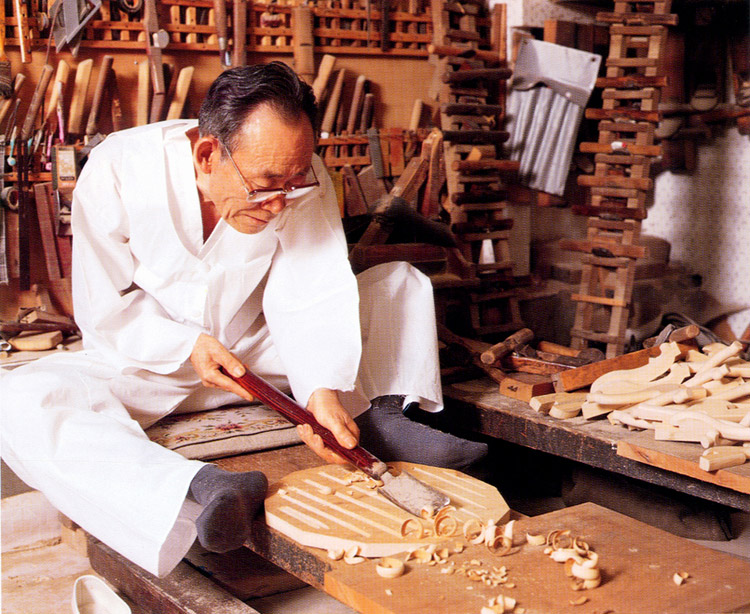
A man making a soban

The art of making soban, called sobanjang, is designated one of Korea's Important Intangible Cultural Properties, and was sufficiently important in the past for it to have been a state-sponsored profession.

Soban are generally classified in various ways. Commonly they are referred to by their region of origin. Another standard system classifies them by the shape and number of the legs, the most popular of which is hojokban ("tiger leg"). The shape of the table's surface (rectangular, circular, octagonal etc.) is also used to differentiate them.

== See also ==
- Chabudai, a short-legged Japanese table
