= Chabudai =

Short-legged Japanese tables

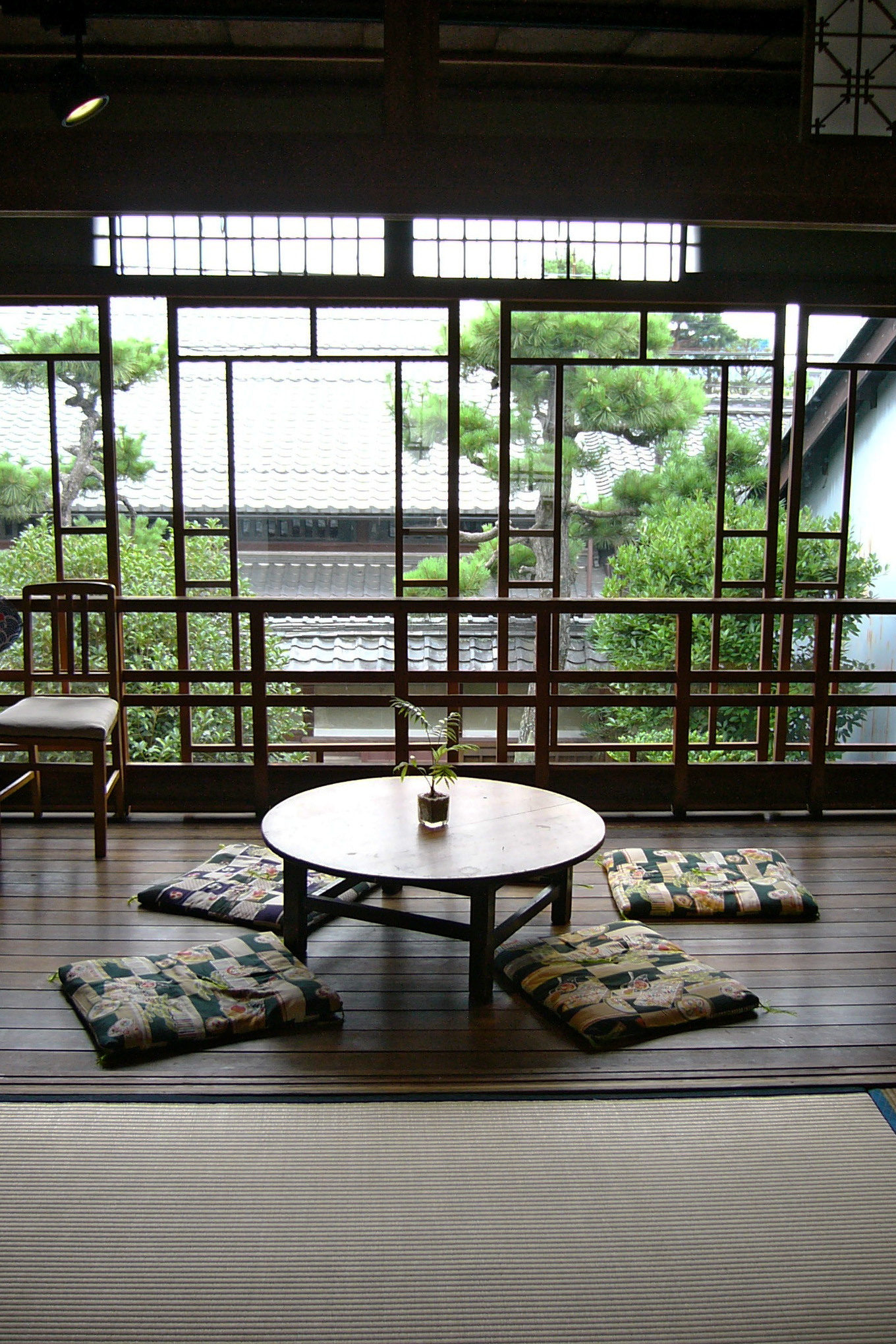
Chabudai in a traditional setting

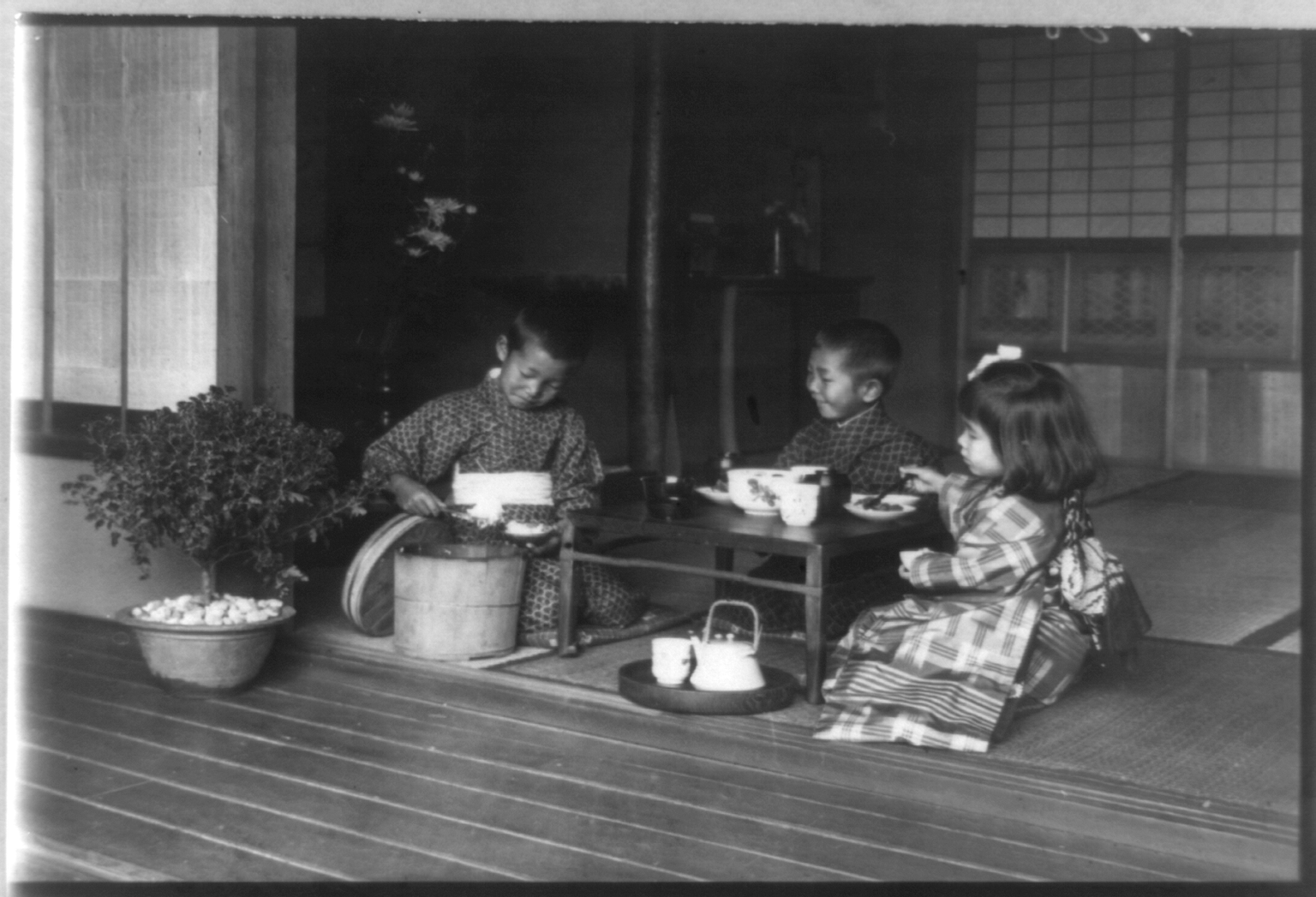
In use, circa 1900

A chabudai (Note: Variously written in Japanese as ちゃぶ台, 卓袱台, 茶袱台, or 茶部台.) is a short-legged table used in traditional Japanese homes. The original models ranged in height from 15 cm (5.9 in) to 30 cm (12 in). People seated at a chabudai may sit on zabuton or tatami rather than on chairs. The four legs are generally collapsible so that the table may be moved and stored easily.

Chabudai are used for various purposes, such as study tables, work benches, or dinner tables (食卓, shokutaku). In the winter, the chabudai is often replaced by a kotatsu, another type of short-legged table equipped with a removable top and a heater underneath.

Since early modern Japan, households have used personal tray tables (膳, zen) for dinner, which are small short-legged tables on which dishes for one person are placed per table. This allowed individuals to freely move the tray table and eat wherever they preferred. After the rise of the chabudai around 1920, the custom of commensality emerged in Japan where families have dinner together around a singular table. Large dishes are placed in the middle of the chabudai to be shared, and individuals take a portion of their desired food. Whereas talking while having dinner was considered disrespectful previously, conversations naturally occurred around the chabudai table, so the table manners eased to accepting dinner table talk.

== Chabudai gaeshi ==
Chabudai gaeshi is a Japanese phrase meaning "to flip [the] chabudai". It describes the act of violently upending a chabudai as an expression of anger, frustration, and disapproval. It may also figuratively describe an analogous outburst and upheaval.

Video game designer Shigeru Miyamoto "upends the tea table" whenever a game's development did not meet his standard or needed serious reconsideration. He characterized chabudai gaeshi as an "action of old-fashioned Japanese fathers" that "would destroy the family" if attempted literally in modern Japanese society.

A Japanese arcade game, Cho Chabudai Gaeshi, is based upon the scenario of chabudai gaeshi.

== See also ==
- Coffee table
- Folding table
- Housing in Japan
- Soban, a similar, small Korean table
