= Cho Chabudai Gaeshi =

2009 video game

- Developer(s): Taito
- Publisher(s): Taito (Japan); IGS (worldwide)
- Platform(s): Arcade
- Release: JP: Fall 2009; WW: 2010

Cho Chabudai Gaeshi (roughly translates to Super Dinner Table Flipping) is an arcade game developed and published by Taito. In the game, the player must pound their hands and flip the game's plastic table peripheral in one of four scenarios to score points.

== Gameplay ==
Cho Chabudai Gaeshi offers four scenarios to choose from: A man and his family, a bride at her wedding, a guest at a host club, and a frustrated office worker. Using a plastic table peripheral, the player has sixty seconds to pound their hands on the top of the table and flip it. Flipping over the table results in objects going on the floor, resulting in points.

== Development ==
Cho Chabudai Gaeshi was developed and published by Taito. It was released in Fall 2009. In 2010, IGS licensed the game from Taito and released it worldwide as Anger Explosion. The game has been translated into English, and this version also adds ticket redemption features.

== Reception and sequel ==
James Stephanie Sterling from Destructoid called it "basically the best game ever." Will Greenwald from Geek.com considered it to be one of the best arcade games ever.

In 2017, Gerald Lynch from TechRadar placed the game on his list of the 50 best arcade games ever, stating that, while not necessarily a great game, it was hard to forget due to its "absolutely crazy concept".

Cho Chabudai Gaeshi later received a sequel titled "Cho Chabudai Gaeshi 2". In addition to the four scenarios from the first game, three more were added, including a ghost of a dead man at his own funeral, who overturns his coffin with his body still inside. The game also introduces multiplayer mode, which was absent in the first game. Unlike the first game, Cho Chabudai Gaeshi 2 was only released in Japan.
