= Coffee table =

Low table meant to be placed in sitting areas

A coffee table is a low table designed to be placed in a sitting area for convenient support of beverages, remote controls, magazines, books (especially large, illustrated coffee table books), decorative objects, and other small items.

Most coffee tables are made of wood (though faux wood tables are increasingly common) or glass and metal, typically stainless steel or aluminium, and may incorporate cabinets or drawers.

== Origins ==
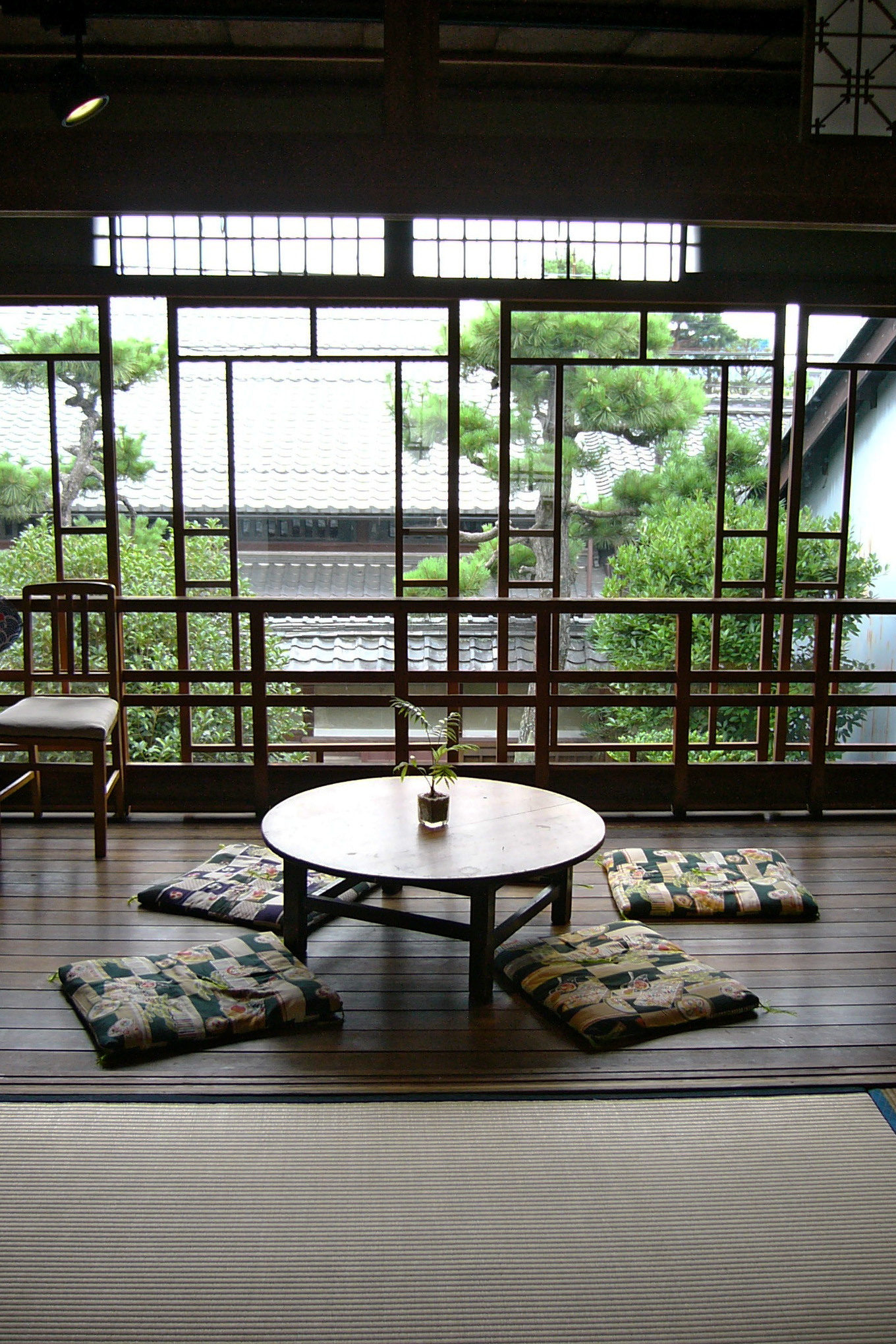
Japanese-style coffee table

In Europe, the first tables specifically designed as and called coffee tables, appear to have been made in Britain during the late Victorian era.

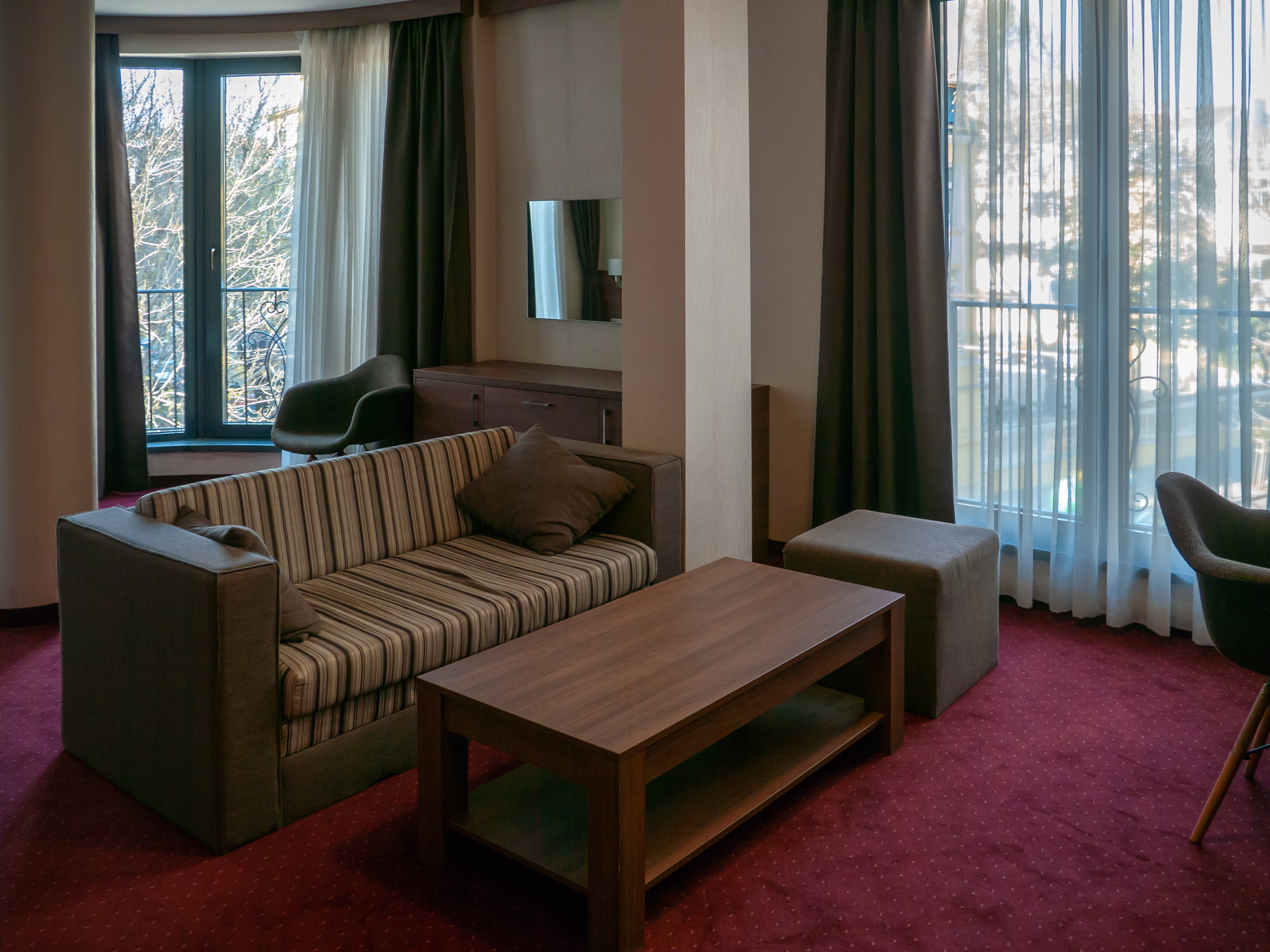
Couch and coffee table in a hotel room

According to the listing in Victorian Furniture by R. W. Symonds & B. B. Whineray and also in The Country Life Book of English Furniture by Edward T. Joy, a table designed by E. W. Godwin in 1868 and made in large numbers by William Watt, and Collinson and Lock, is a coffee table. If this is correct, it may be one of the earliest made in Europe. Other sources list it only as a "table", so this can not be stated categorically. Far from being a low table, this table was about twenty-seven inches high.

Later coffee tables were designed as low tables, similar to ones used in tea houses. As the Anglo-Japanese style was popular in Britain throughout the 1870s and 1880s, and low tables were common in Japan, this seems to be a likely source for the concept of a long low table.

From the late 19th century onward, many coffee tables were subsequently made in earlier styles due to the popularity of revivalism, so it is quite possible to find Louis XVI-style coffee tables or Georgian-style coffee tables, but there seems to be no evidence of a table actually made as a coffee table before this time. Joseph Aronson in 1938 defined a coffee table as a "low wide table now used before a sofa or couch", adding "there is no historical precedent", perhaps suggesting they came late in the history of furniture. With the increasing availability of television sets from the 1950s onward, coffee tables came into their own, since they are low enough, even with cups and glasses on them, not to obstruct the view of the TV.

== See also ==
- Coffee table book
- Nightstand
- Chabudai
