= Gateleg table =

Type of dropleaf table

A gateleg table or gate-leg table is a type of furniture first introduced in England in the 16th century. The tabletop has a fixed section and one or two hinged leaves, which, when not in use, fold down below the fixed section to hang vertically.

== Description ==
Gateleg tables are a subset of the type known as a dropleaf. The hinged section, or flap, was supported on pivoted legs joined at the top and bottom by stretchers constituting a gate. Large flaps had two supports, which had the advantage of providing freer leg space in the centre.

The earliest gateleg tables of the 16th and 17th centuries were typically made of oak.

== Images ==
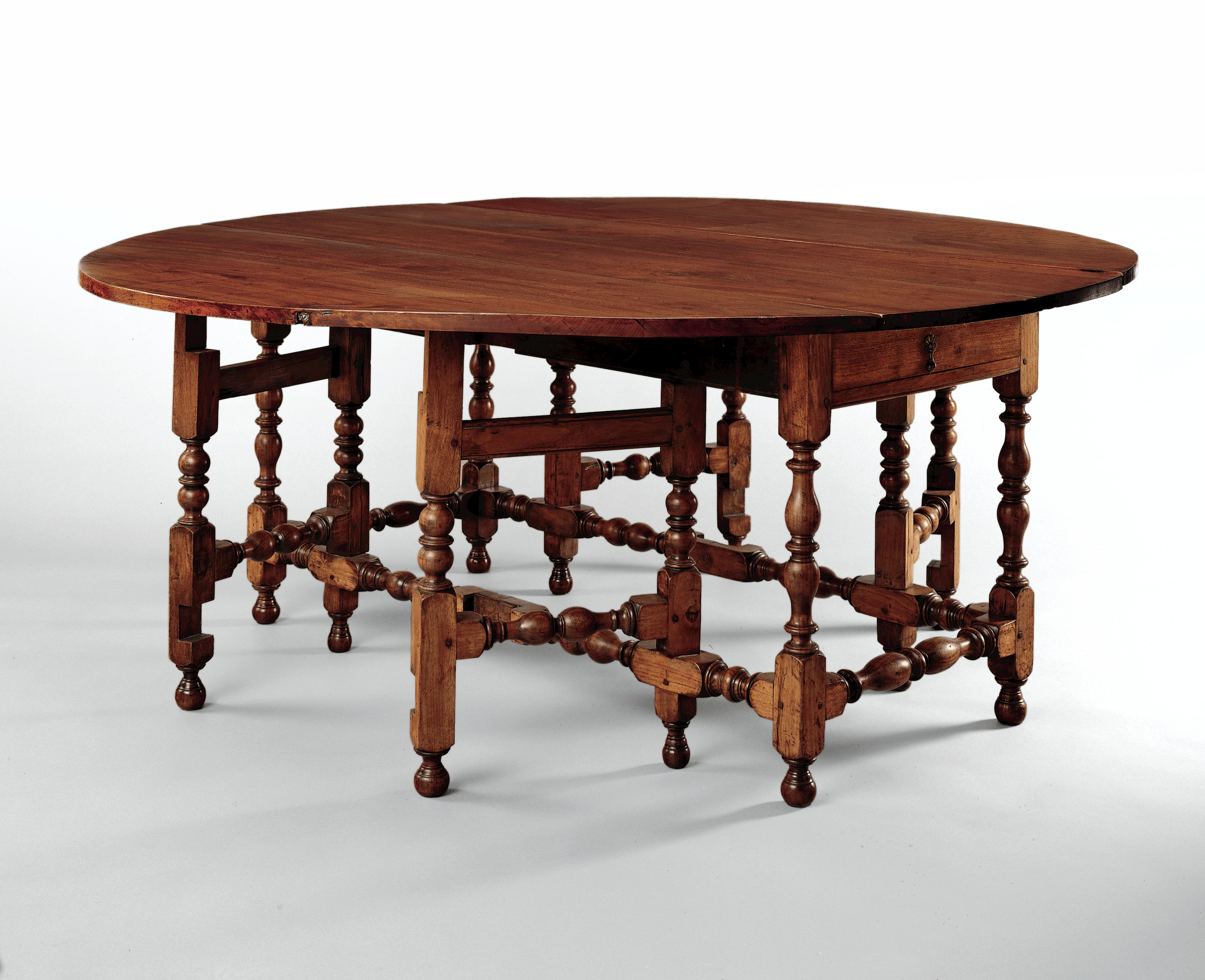
Gateleg table, between 1690 and 1720, Metropolitan Museum of Art.

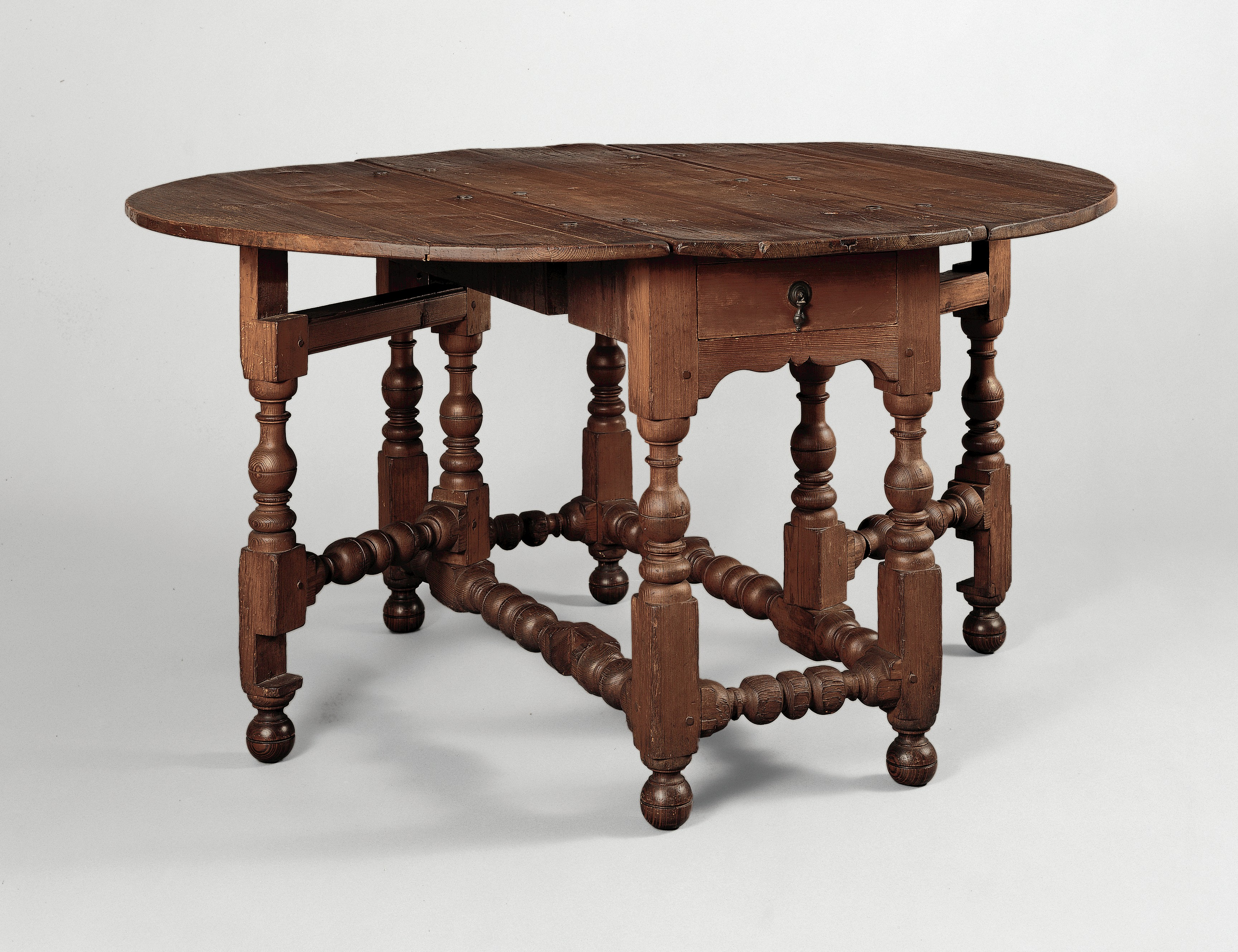
Gateleg table, between 1700 and 1750, Metropolitan Museum of Art.

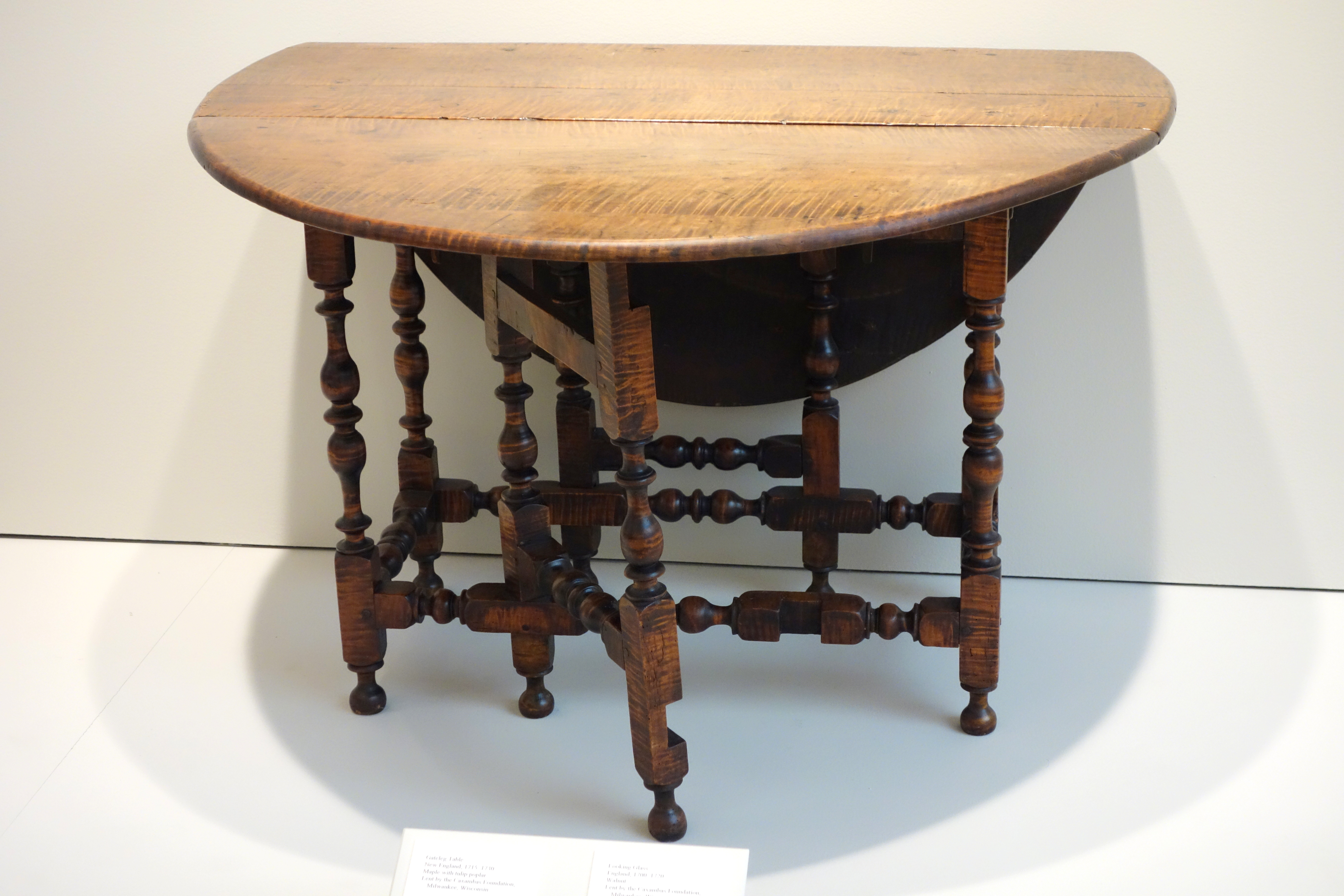
Gateleg table of maple and tulip polar wood, New England, 1715-1730, Chazen Museum of Art.

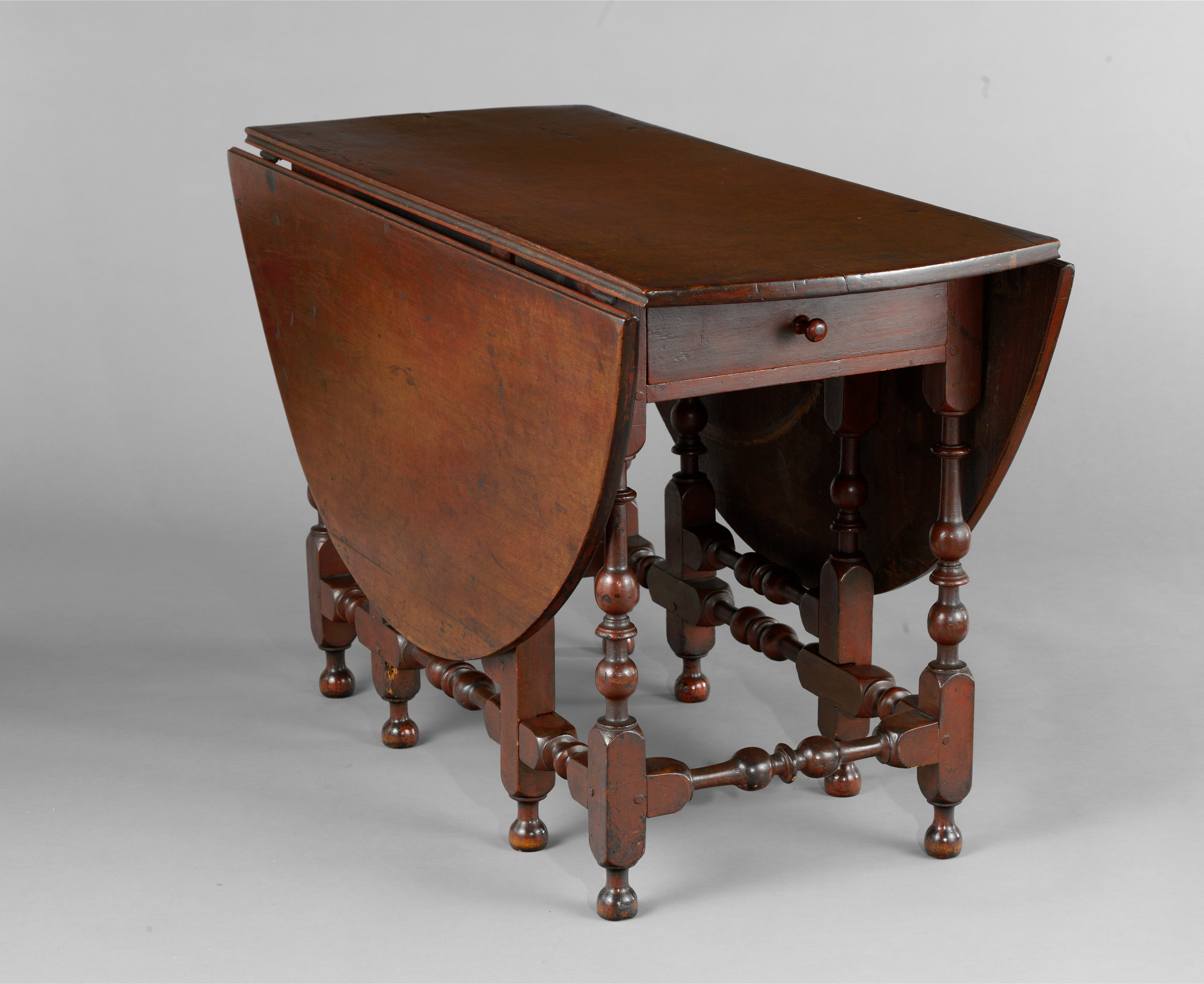
Gateleg table, between 1715 and 1740, Metropolitan Museum of Art.

== See also ==
- English furniture
