= Tip-top table =

Folding table

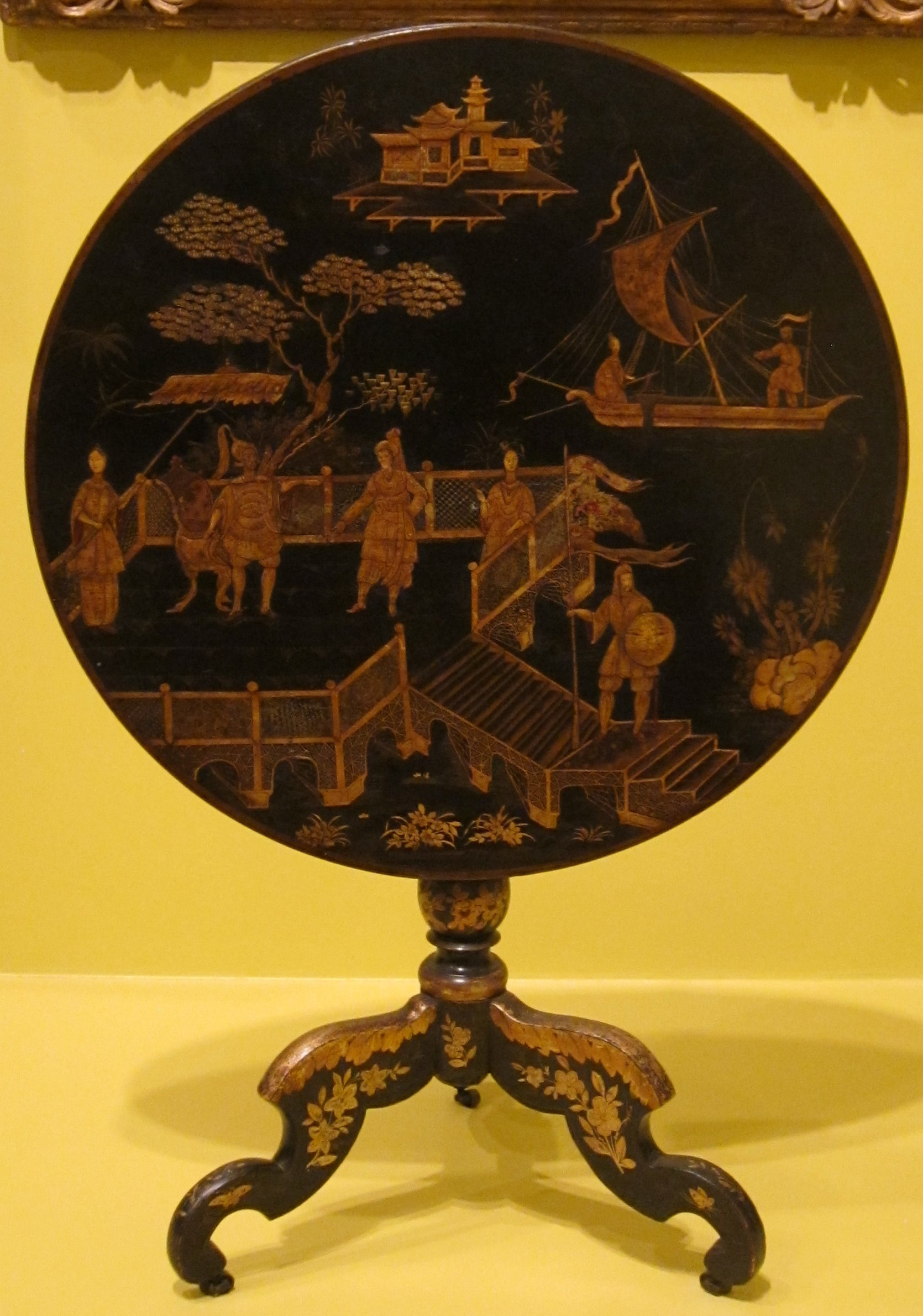
Folded late 18th century English loo table with Japanese motifs.

A Tip-top table is a folding table with the tabletop hinged so it can be placed into a vertical position when not used to save space. It is also called tilt-top table, tip table, snap table some variations are known as tea table, loo table. These multi-purpose tables were historically used for playing games, drinking tea or spirits, reading and writing, and sewing. The tables were popular among both elite and middle-class households in Britain and the US in the 18th and 19th centuries. They became collector's items (pie-crust tea tables) early in the 20th century.

== Construction ==
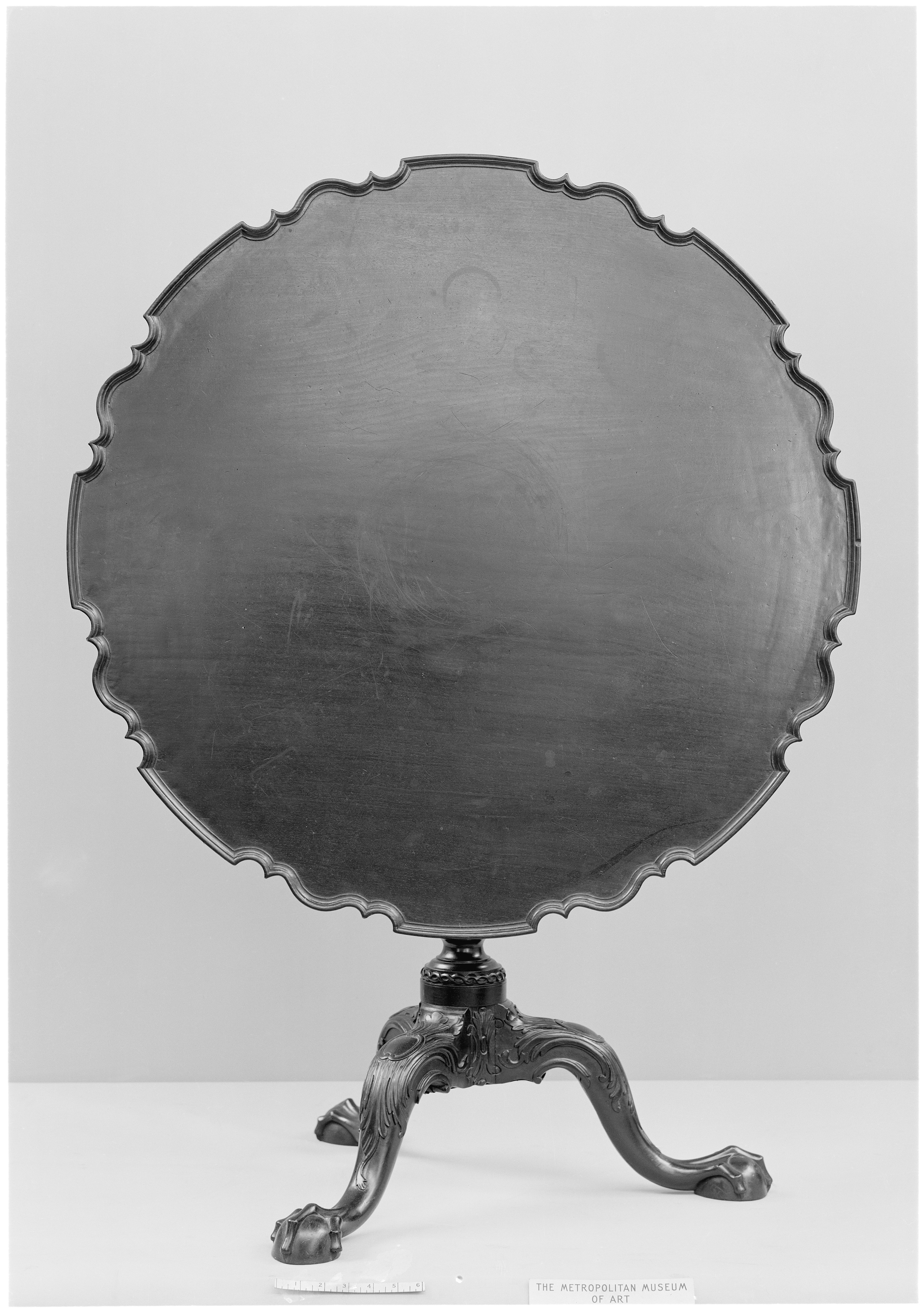
Tabletop with scalloped edges

The tables were assembled from three main components: legs (typically three), pillar, and top. The latter came in three main varieties: "plain" with smooth edges, "dished" with molded edges protruding either up to prevent sliding of items off the table (in-turned molding) or down for purely decorative purposes (descending molding), and ornate with carved and molded (scalloped using combinations of cyma curves and flat segments) edges.

The pillars were turned and usually have either a balluster or plain cylinder/conical shape sometimes with carved decorations at the bottom in the shape of compressed balls, inverted cups, etc.

The legs formed a tripod and came in a large variety from cabriolet with articulated shoulders to smooth curves sloping towards the floor.

The table measurements varied:

Ranges of sizes, in inches
| Measurements | Minimum | Low typical | High typical | Maximum |
|---|---|---|---|---|
| Height | 25 | 27 | 29 | 30 |
| Diameter | 18 | 28 | 36 | 40 |
| Tripod width | 20 | 26 | 29 | 30 |

A range of smaller tabletops, called "candlestands" (and, despite the name, most likely multi-purpose), was also popular, with top diameters between 18 and 22 inches and tripod widths between 20 and 22 inches.

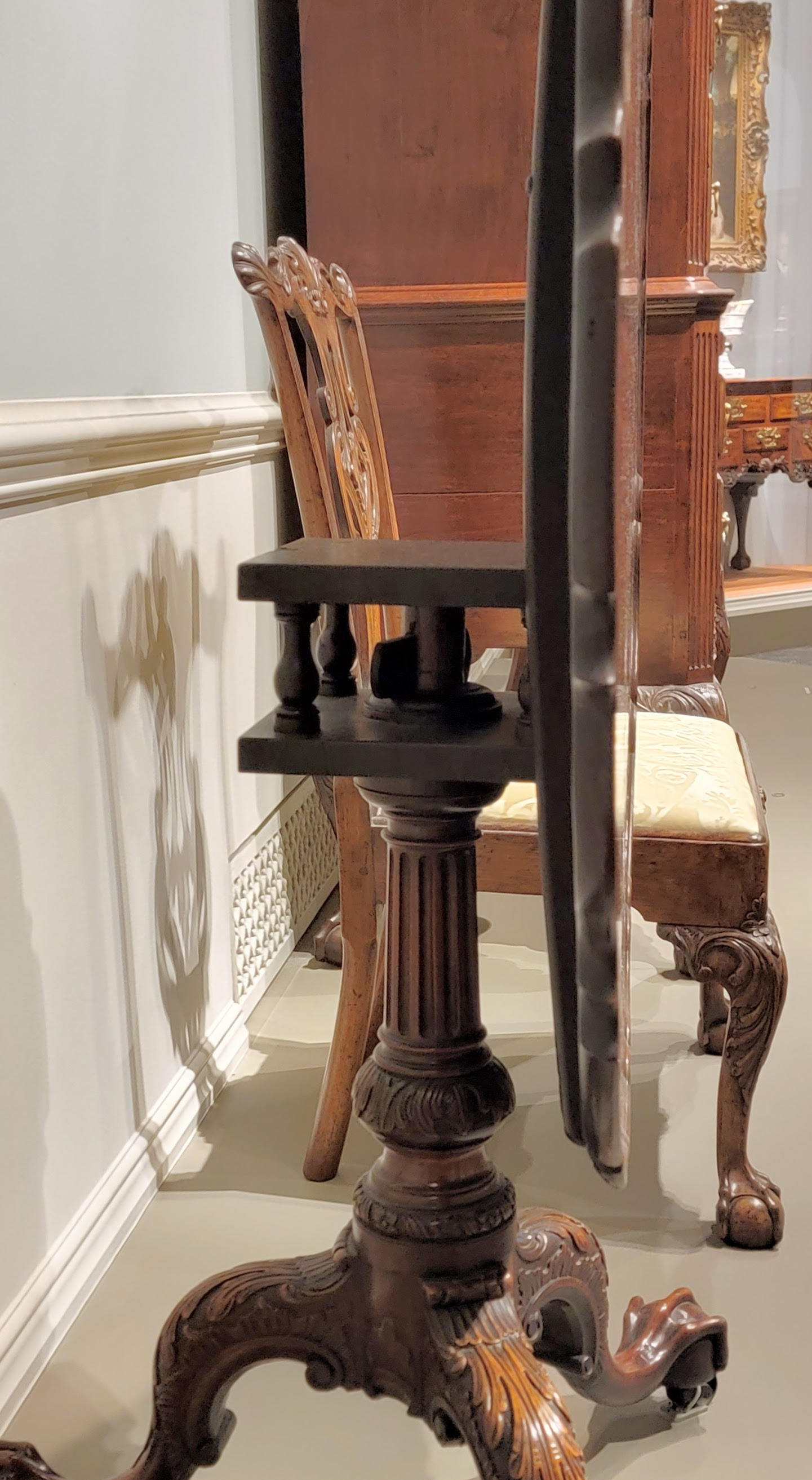
Birdcage mechanism

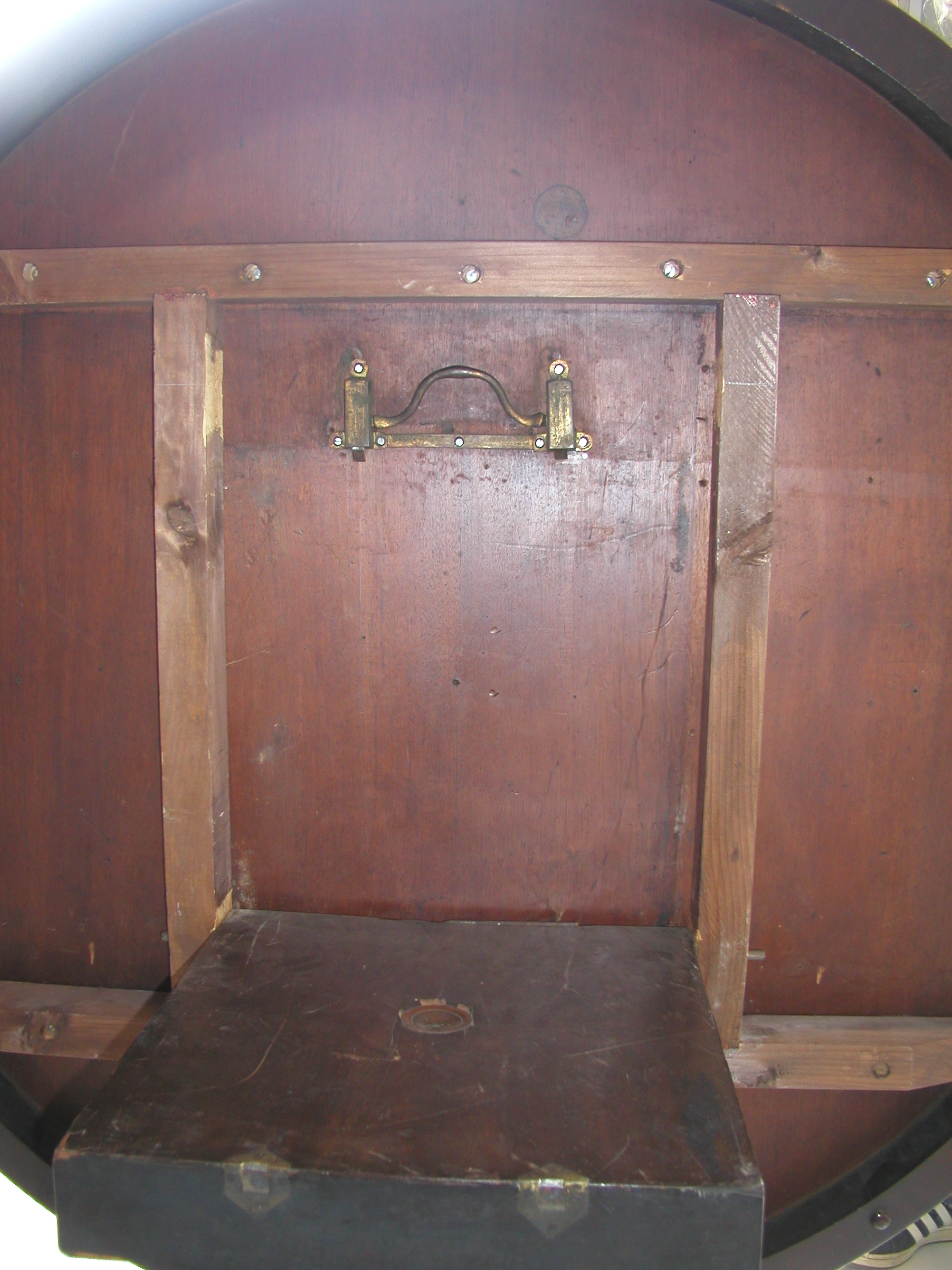
Snap mechanism

The tables frequently utilized a box ("birdcage") at the top of the pillar, so that the tabletop can be rotated relatively to the tripod. This flexibility allowed for more compact storage: a folded table can be either pushed against a wall with two legs, or oriented with one leg going into a corner.

== In the USA ==
The tip-top tables appeared "suddenly" in the British North American colonies around 1740 and enjoyed a still-unexplained rapid spread.

Manufacturing of tip-top tables in the United States was almost immediately characterized by a wide-scale division of labor: the craftsmen actively traded the table parts and manufacturing services (carving, turning).

== Loo table ==
The loo table, with three or four legs, is a table model from the 18th and 19th centuries originally designed for the card game loo, which was also known as lanterloo.

Gloag points to the term being applied to both the tilting and also to non-folding round gaming tables.

== In culture ==
The design of the tip-top table has multiple disadvantages. Many tables were neither sturdy, nor stable, with easily breakable mechanisms. The accounts of cabinetmakers have many records of fixing the tilting mechanism; the contemporary satirical pictures compared the instability of the table to that of the fashionable society. Still, the very fragility of the tip-top tables underlined the refinement of the parlor. Getting a tilt-top involved a significant expense; the purchase indicated the desire to participate in the genteel theatricality of the entertainment.

A loo-table stands in the hall at Midnight Place in the children's fiction book Midnight is a Place by Joan Aiken.

== Sources ==
- Fayen, Sarah Neale (Spring 2002). Tilt-top tables: commodities in eighteenth-century America (Master of Arts thesis). University of Delaware.
- Sack, Albert (January 1987). "Regionalism in Early American Tea Tables". Antiques. 131 (1): 248–263.
- Gloag, J. (2013a). "Snap Table". A Short Dictionary Of Furniture. Read Books Limited. ISBN 978-1-4474-9772-1.
- Gloag, J. (2013b). "Loo Table". A Short Dictionary Of Furniture. Read Books Limited. ISBN 978-1-4474-9772-1.
- Miller, J. (2005). "Tilt-Top Tables". Furniture: World Styles from Classical to Contemporary. DK Publishing. ISBN 978-0-7566-7288-1.
- LeFever, George (October 2007). "Tables for Tea" (PDF). Early American Life.
