= Strozzi =

Strozzi is an Italian surname. Notable people with the surname include:

- Numerous members of the Strozzi family, an ancient later ennobled family from Florence
  - Alessandra Macinghi Strozzi (c. 1408–1471), an Italian businesswoman and aristocrat
  - Barbara Strozzi (1619–1677), an Italian singer and composer
  - Filippo Strozzi the Elder (1428–1491), an Italian banker and aristocrat
  - Filippo Strozzi the Younger (1489–1538), an Italian banker and aristocrat
  - Filippo di Piero Strozzi (1541–1582), an Italian military officer
  - Giulio Strozzi (1583-1652), a Venetian poet and libretto writer
  - Leone Strozzi (1515–1554), an Italian military officer
  - Lorenzo Strozzi (1513–1571), an Italian clergyman
  - Palla Strozzi (1372–1462), an Italian aristocrat
  - Peter Strozzi (1626–1664), an Austrian nobleman and general
  - Piero Strozzi (c. 1510–1558), an Italian military officer
  - Piero Strozzi (composer), an Italian aristocrat and composer
- Bernardo Strozzi (c. 1581–1644), an Italian Baroque painter and engraver
- Maja Strozzi-Pečić (1882–1962), a Croatian opera singer
- Marija Ružička Strozzi (1850–1937), a Croatian actress
- Tito Strozzi (actor) (1892–1970), a Croatian actor and writer
- Zanobi Strozzi (1412-1468), an Italian Renaissance painter and manuscript illuminator
