= Filippo Strozzi =

Filippo Strozzi may refer to:

- Filippo Strozzi the Elder (1428–1491), Italian banker and statesman
- Filippo Strozzi the Younger (1489–1538), Italian banker, statesman and military leader
- Filippo di Piero Strozzi (1541–1582), Italian military leader, grandson of the latter

== See also ==
- Strozzi family
