= Leone Strozzi =

Italian condottiero

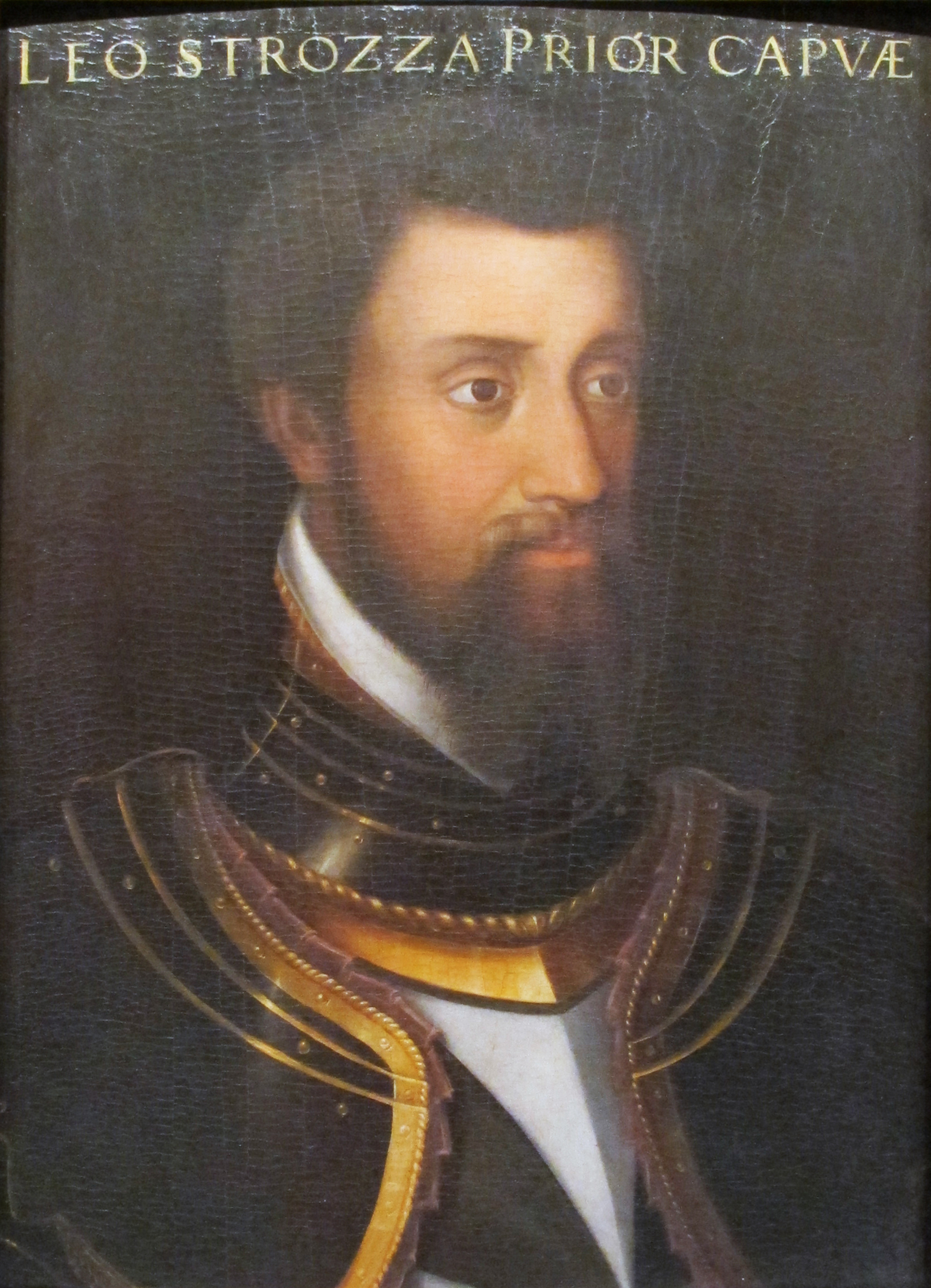
Leone Strozzi

Leone Strozzi (15 October 1515 – 28 June 1554) was an Italian condottiero belonging to the famous Strozzi family of Florence.

== Biography ==
He was the son of Filippo Strozzi the Younger and Clarice de' Medici, and brother to Piero, Roberto and Lorenzo Strozzi.

After his father's defeat in the Battle of Montemurlo, Strozzi fled with his brothers to France, at the court of Catherine de' Medici. Later he fought against Cosimo I de' Medici at Siena, but was again defeated.

In 1530, Strozzi became a knight of the Order of Malta, for which he was Prior in Capua. In 1536, he was named commander of the galleys of the Order, a position he held again in 1552. In August 1547 he captured St Andrews Castle in Scotland from the Protestant Lairds of Fife who had killed David Beaton. The lairds knew an expert was in the field when they observed cannon being winched into position with ropes rather than exposing the besiegers to their fire.

In 1537, he commanded a wing in the Battle of Antipaxos.

Strozzi died in the siege of Scarlino, in Tuscany, during the unsuccessful defence of Republic of Siena against Florence and the Holy Roman Empire, shot by an arquebus ball.

== In popular culture ==
Leone Strozzi plays an important role in Pawn in Frankincense, the fourth book in Dorothy Dunnett's Lymond Chronicles.

== Ancestry ==
Ancestors of Leone Strozzi

16. Simone Strozzi
8. Matteo Strozzi
17. Andreina Rondinelli
4. Filippo Strozzi the Elder
18. Filippo Macinghi
9. Alessandra Macinghi
19. Caterina di Bernardo Alberti
2. Filippo Strozzi the Younger
10. Bartolommeo Gianfigliazzi
5. Salvaggia Gianfigliazzi
1. Leone Strozzi
24. Piero de' Medici
12. Lorenzo de' Medici
25. Lucrezia Tornabuoni
6. Piero de' Medici
26. Jacopo Orsini, Lord of Monterotondo
13. Clarice Orsini
27. Maddalena Orsini (daughter of 28 and 29)
3. Clarice de' Medici
28. Carlo Orsini, Lord of Bracciano
14. Roberto Orsini, Count of Tagliacozzo
29. Paola Orsini
7. Alfonsina Orsini
30. Amerigo Sanseverino, Count of Capaccio
15. Caterina Sanseverino
31. Margherita Sanseverino

== See also ==
- Condottieri
- Italian Wars
- Battle of Marciano
