= Piero Strozzi =

Italian military leader

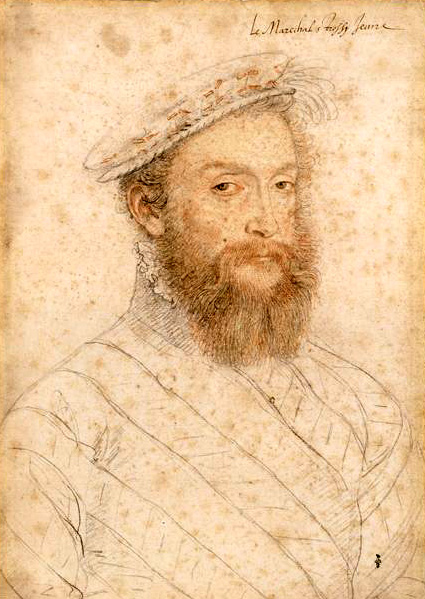
Portrait of Piero Strozzi by Workshop of François Clouet .

Piero (or Pietro) Strozzi (c. 1510 – 21 June 1558) was an Italian military leader. He was a member of the rich Florentine family of the Strozzi.

== Biography ==
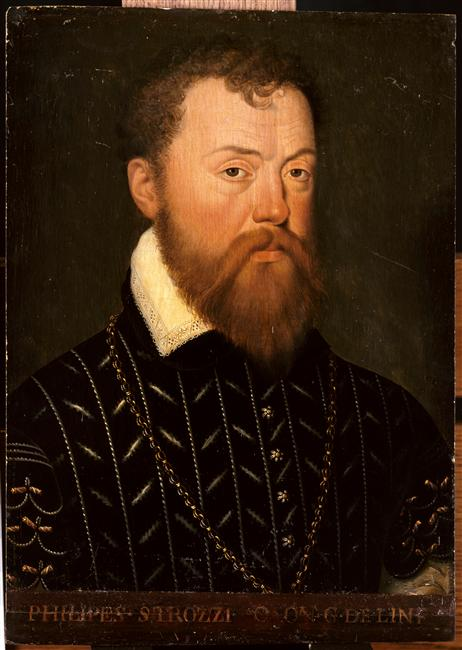
Portrait of Piero Strozzi by Anonymous artist

Born in Florence, Piero Strozzi was the son of Filippo Strozzi the Younger and Clarice de' Medici.

Although in 1539 he married another Medici, Laudomia di Pierfrancesco, he was a fierce opponent of the main line of that family. He fought in the army led by his father and other Florentine exiles from France to oust the Medici from Florence, but, after their defeat at the Battle of Montemurlo, Piero fled to France at the court of Catherine de' Medici.

He was in French service during the Italian War of 1542. Having raised an army of Italian mercenaries, he was confronted by the Imperial-Spanish forces at the Battle of Serravalle, where he was defeated. According to the cryptographers and historians who in 2022 examined an encoded letter sent in 1547 by Charles V to his ambassador in France there was fear that Strozzi would send an assassin. In 1548 he was in Scotland supporting Mary of Guise of behalf of Henry II of France, during the war of the Rough Wooing. There he designed fortifications against the English at Leith and Haddington. After he was shot in the thigh by an arquebus at Haddington, Strozzi supervised the works at Leith from a chair carried by four workmen. Strozzi also designed works at Dunbar Castle with the assistance of Migliorino Ubaldini.

In 1551 he successfully defended Mirandola against papal troops during the War of Parma. He was named Marshal of France in 1554.

Later he fought in the defence of the Republic of Siena against Cosimo de' Medici, leading a French army. He obtained a pyrrhic victory at Pontedera on 11 June 1554, but his army could not receive help from the ships of his brother Leone (who had been killed by an arquebus shot near Castiglione della Pescaia) and he was forced to retreat to Pistoia. On 2 August his defeat at the Battle of Marciano meant the end of the Sienese independence.

In 1556 he was appointed as superintendent of the Papal army and lord of Épernay. In 1558, under the command of Francis, Duke of Guise, he participated in the siege of Thionville (1558), near Metz in Lorraine. He died there from wounds received on 21 June 1558.

He is generally credited as the inventor of the dragoon military speciality (arquebusiers à cheval or horse arquebusiers).

His son Filippo was also a military commander, as was his brother Leone Strozzi, a Knight of Malta, known as the Prior of Capua.

== Issue ==
By his wife Laudomia, a sister of Lorenzino de' Medici and Giuliano de' Medici, Archbishop of Albi, he had two children:

- Filippo Strozzi (1541-1582), military commander;
- Clarice Strozzi (dead in December 1567), married Onorato I of Savoia in 1558.

He had also an illegittime son:

- Scipione Strozzi (dead in 1552), military.

== Ancestry ==
Ancestors of Piero Strozzi

16. Simone Strozzi
8. Matteo Strozzi
17. Andreina Rondinelli
4. Filippo Strozzi the Elder
18. Filippo Macinghi
9. Alessandra Macinghi
2. Filippo Strozzi the Younger
10. Bartolommeo Gianfigliazzi
5. Salvaggia Gianfigliazzi
1. Piero Strozzi
24. Piero de' Medici
12. Lorenzo de' Medici
25. Lucrezia Tornabuoni
6. Piero de' Medici
26. Jacopo Orsini, Lord of Monterotondo
13. Clarice Orsini
27. Maddalena Orsini (daughter of 28 and 29)
3. Clarice de' Medici
28. Carlo Orsini, Lord of Bracciano
14. Roberto Orsini, Count of Tagliacozzo
29. Paola Orsini
7. Alfonsina Orsini
30. Amerigo Sanseverino, Count of Capaccio
15. Caterina Sanseverino
31. Margherita Sanseverino
