= Simonetta da Collevecchio =

Mother of Alessandro de' Medici

Simonetta da Collevecchio (born in Collevecchio – fl. 1510–1534) was a domestic servant of Alfonsina Orsini, wife of Piero the Unfortunate. She was the mother of Alessandro de' Medici, Duke of Florence, by either Lorenzo de' Medici, Duke of Urbino or Pope Clement VII, and has been the subject of several unfounded speculations regarding the parenthood and possible racial origin of her son.

== Life ==
Born in the peasantry in Collevecchio at Tiber Valley, Simonetta was employed as a maidservant in the household of Alfonsina Orsini in Rome. She is identified as the biological mother of Alessandro de' Medici.

Alessandro de' Medici was called il Moro because of his dark complexion, and therefore it has been speculated that Simonetta was of African heritage. French author Jean Nestor claimed twice in his 1560 book that Alessandro's mother was a Moorish slave. However, Simonetta was evidently born in the peasantry and employed as a free maidservant, and not a slave, and there is no proof that she was of African heritage.

It is not verified if Alessandro de' Medici was the son of Simonetta by Lorenzo de' Medici, Duke of Urbino or by Pope Clement VII; modern historians generally favor the first theory.

Simonetta gave birth to Alessandro in 1510, and his career and role as Papal favorite has been pointed out as an indication of his Papal parentage.

Simonetta married a mule driver from Collevecchio, a site associated with Monte della Verna. She continued to enjoy the protection of the Medici family. A letter has been preserved and published, written by her to her son Alessandro, in which she mentioned two children born within her marriage; the letter is dated from 1529, and Simonetta is no longer documented after 1534.
