= Lorenzo Strozzi =

Italian abbot and cardinal

- Lorenzo Strozzi

Personal life
- Born: 3 December 1523 Florence, Italy
- Died: 14 December 1571 (aged 48) Avignon, France
- Parents: Filippo Strozzi (father); Clarice de' Medici (mother)
- Education: University of Padua
- Relatives: Strozzi family House of Medici

Religious life
- Religion: Catholic
- Consecration: 8 June 1550

Senior posting
- Based in: France

Lorenzo Strozzi (3 December 1523 – 14 December 1571) was an Italian abbot and cardinal. He was the son of Filippo Strozzi, a member of the powerful Strozzi family of Florence, and Clarice de' Medici. He became a naturalized French citizen in 1544. In France, the family name was also spelled Stroci, Stroissay, Estroci, Astroci, and Astrotio. He was successively bishop of Béziers, archbishop of Albi, and archbishop of Aix.

== Early life ==
Lorenzo Strozzi was born in Florence, the son of Filippo Strozzi and Clarice de' Medici, niece of Pope Leo X and aunt of Catherine de Medicis. He was the younger brother of Piero Strozzi, who was made a marshal of France by King Henry II in 1554. During the exile of the Strozzi in Padua, he studied the humanities under the direction of Benedetto Varchi, and attended the University of Padua, where he took a doctorate in law.

In 1537, Lorenzo wrote a biography of his father Filippo Strozzi.

In July 1543, Lorenzo and his condottiero brother Pietro received permission from the government of Venice to travel to France; Pietro was bringing 200 mounted arquebusiers, and intended to enter the royal service. Lorenzo was authorized to raise 50 troops in Marano. Pietro and Lorenzo became naturalized French citizens in June 1544 by Lettres de naturalité of King Francis I.

As part of the French Army, he fought Calvinists in Languedoc under Henry II. Bellaud Dessalles points out that there are no sources to verify the claims.

== Church ==
His cousin Queen Catherine de' Medici convinced him to join the church. His ecclesiastical career developed in France, first as abbot commendatory of Saint-Victor in Marseille in 1548, a royal appointment which was void, since Pope Paul had already appointed Cardinal Giulio Feltrio della Rovere (abbot 1548–1565). Lorenzo finally received the abbey on 5 February 1568. He was later appointed abbot commendatory of Villar San Costanzo at Staffarda (Saluzzo, Piedmont).

Queen Catherine wrote to Pope Paul III's grandson, Cardinal Alessandro Farnese, on 12 August 1547, requesting a cardinalate for Lorenzo Strozzi. The request was repeated in December 1547, but to no effect. In December 1548, Henri II received word from Rome that his agent was unable to extract any promise from the pope.

He was then nominated bishop of Béziers by King Henry II of France, and confirmed by Pope Paul III in the papal consistory of 7 December 1547. He replaced Bishop-elect François Gouffier, who had resigned on 5 December. Strozzi was only 24 years old. He took possession of the diocese on 27 February 1548, but was not consecrated a bishop until 8 June 1550. In 1551, he appointed as Administrator of the diocese the abbot of Villelongue, Pierre de Puimisson.

Strozzi was named a councilor of Henry II in 1547, and took part in a session of Parlement presided over by the king on 2 July 1548. He did not attend the Estates at Montpellier 21 October 1551, but sent a procurator. He did not attend the provincial council of Narbonne on 10–20 December 1551. On 17 October 1552, he failed to attend the meeting of the Estates at Nîmes, and did not send a procurator; he was therefore fined 10 livres. Since 1551, preachers sent from Geneva had been making inroads in the diocese of Béziers, where memories of Albigensian teachings, especially their opposition to the clerical estate, were still strong.

Strozzi's brother Leo was killed in battle on 25 June 1554, fighting in the French army before Scarlino, in Sienese territory, on the mainland opposite the island of Elba.

He was made a cardinal by Pope Paul IV in the consistory of 15 March 1557, with the title of Santa Balbina. He was present in Rome on 20 September 1557, to receive his red hat from the pope. He stayed on into October, carrying out businnes entrusted to him by the Queen, including finding a court-painter. He was back in Béziers by the beginning of 1558.

When Pope Paul IV died on 18 August 1559, Cardinal Strozzi was sent by King Francis II to Rome, with instructions for the French faction in the Conclave. The French candidates, chosen by Catherine de Medicis and the Cardinal of Guise-Lorraine, were Cardinal Ippolito d"Este, a longtime resident at the French court, then Cardinal François de Tournon, and thirdly Cardinal Ercole Gonzaga. Five French cardinals, however, did not make the trip to Rome, despite royal prodding. The conclave began on 5 September and lasted until the election of Giovanni Angelo de' Medici on Christmas Day. Strozzi was not a candidate, nor did he feature in the politicking, and, at the age of thirty-five and a cardinal for two and a half years, he had little personal influence among his fellows. On 9 November, he wrote to the Queen that he was following her orders faithfully.

Cardinal Strozzi did not attend the papal conclave of 20 December 1565–7 January 1566.

Later, he was named Administrator of the diocese of Albi in the papal consistory of 9 May 1561; he made his solemn entry into Albi on 6 October 1561. In August 1562, he obtained letters of protection from King Charles IX, and in 1563 he took the oath of allegiance to the king in person. King Charles named him his lieutenant in the Albigeois. He was nominated archbishop of Aix-en-Provence by Charles IX, and confirmed on 6 February 1568, by Pope Pius V; he was granted the pallium on 11 April 1568. He took possession of the diocese on 14 April 1568.

== Later life ==
He died at Avignon on 14 December 1571, and was buried in the Church of S. Agricol.

== Ancestry ==
Ancestors of Lorenzo Strozzi

16. Simone Strozzi
8. Matteo Strozzi
17. Andreina Rondinelli
4. Filippo Strozzi the Elder
18. Filippo Macinghi
9. Alessandra Macinghi
2. Filippo Strozzi the Younger
10. Bartolommeo Gianfigliazzi
5. Salvaggia Gianfigliazzi
1. Lorenzo Strozzi
24. Piero de' Medici
12. Lorenzo de' Medici
25. Lucrezia Tornabuoni
6. Piero de' Medici
26. Jacopo Orsini, Lord of Monterotondo
13. Clarice Orsini
27. Maddalena Orsini (daughter of 28 and 29)
3. Clarice de' Medici
28. Carlo Orsini, Lord of Bracciano
14. Roberto Orsini, Count of Tagliacozzo
29. Paola Orsini
7. Alfonsina Orsini
30. Amerigo Sanseverino, Count of Capaccio
15. Caterina Sanseverino
31. Margherita Sanseverino

== Sources ==
- Albanés, Joseph Hyacinthe; Fillet, Louis; Chevalier Ulysse (1899). Gallia christiana novissima: Aix, Apt, Fréjus, Gap, Riez et Sisteron. (in French and Latin). Montbéliard: Société anonyme d'imprimerie montbéliardaise. pp. 121–123.
- Bellaud Dessalles, Mathilde (1901), Les évèques italiens de l'ancien diocèse de Béziers, 1547-1669. Paris: A. Picard.
- Eubel, Conradus; Gulik, Guilelmus, eds. (1923). Hierarchia catholica (in Latin). Vol. 3 (second ed.). Münster: Libreria Regensbergiana.. Archived.
- Fisquet, Honoré (1864). La France pontificale (Gallia Christiana): Beziers, Lodève, Saint-Pons de Thomières (in French). Paris: Etienne Repos. pp. 168–174.
- Lacger, L. de (1911). "Le cardinal Laurent Strozzi et son épiscopat albigeois," (in French), in: Albia christiana Vol. 8 (1911), pp. 289-306.

Catholic Church titles
| Preceded by François Gouffier | Bishop of Béziers; 1547–1561 | Succeeded by Julien de Médicis |
| Preceded by Pedro Pacheco de Villena | Cardinal-Priest of S. Balbina; 1557–1571 | Succeeded by Gaspar Cervantes de Gaeta |
| Preceded by Louis I of Lothringen-Guise | Archbishop of Albi; 1561–1568 | Succeeded by Philippe de Rodolfis |
| Preceded by Jean de Saint-Chamond | Archbishop of Aix; 1568–1571 | Succeeded by Julien de Médicis |
