= Lorenzo di Piero de' Medici =

Lorenzo di Piero de' Medici may refer to:

- Lorenzo de' Medici (1449–1492), also known as il Magnifico
- Lorenzo de' Medici, Duke of Urbino (1492–1519), his grandson, to whom Machiavelli dedicated The Prince
