= Piero de' Medici =

Piero de' Medici may refer to:

- Piero di Cosimo de' Medici (1416–1469) (the Gouty, also Piero I de' Medici), father of Lorenzo the Magnificent
- Piero di Lorenzo de' Medici (1471–1503) (the Unfortunate, also Piero II de' Medici), son of Lorenzo the Magnificent
