= Giovanni Rosini =

Italian historian

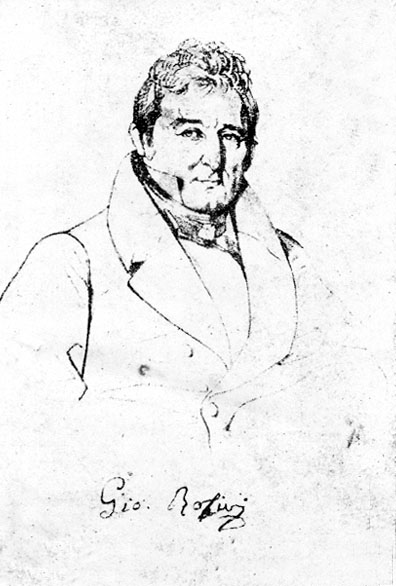

Giovanni Rosini (24 June 1776 – 16 May 1855) was an Italian writer and art historian.

== Biography ==
Born in Lucignano in the Val di Chiana. His father was a doctor. While Giovanni was an infant, the family moved to Livorno, where he lived till the age of 12 years. In Livorno, he studied Latin under the Abbott Ragni and literature under a canon Fortini . When his father was named royal vicar of Ponte a Sieve, Giovanni entered the seminary in Fiesole, where he studied rhetoric under Bazzi and Traballesi until 1791. He then studied philosophy in Florence under the professor and monk Rossi. In Florence, he acquired the support of Lorenzo Pignotti. In 1798, he was chosen to be an editor of the complete works of Melchiorre Cesarotti. He received further commissions to help edit classic works. He was selected to be Professor of Eloquence at the University of Pisa. In 1808, discussions were started to renew the Accademia della Crusca, and including Rosini. In 1813, he traveled to Paris. He soon began to write a history of Italian painting, published in 1839-1854 under the title Storia della pittura italiana esposta coi monumenti with numerous engravings. The history spanned from the age of Masaccio to that of Appiani.

Rosini proved very prolific and successful as author and editor. He also wrote a biography of the sculptor Antonio Canova (Pisa 1823). He also wrote popular novels based on historic figures, such as a three volume story based on the story of the Monaca di Monza (The Nun of Monza), Marianna de Leyva y Marino, in 1833, a four volume work, titled Luisa Strozzi, in 1853, a novel on Ugolino della Gherardesca. Honors followed his success. In 1840, he was granted the Cross of the Legion of Honour of France; in 1841, the Cross of Santi Maurizio e Lazzaro; in 1847 the civil order of Merit by the Grand-Duke of Tuscany and a 600 lire stipend as a member of the Order of Santo Stefano. He was editor of a 25 volume edition of major Italian historians: Collezione di ottimi scrittori italiani, including historical works by Donato Giannotti, Pier Francesco Giambullari, Dino Compagni, and Camillo Porzio.

He was buried in the Camposanto of Pisa.

== Selected works ==
- The Nun of Monza (translated in English), Volume 1, James Duffy 7, Wellington Quay, Dublin, 1850.
- Luisa Strozzi, Storia del Secolo XVI Felice Le Monniera, Florence (1850).
- Storia della Pittura Italiana; Volume 5, Epoca terza de Giulio Romano al Baroccio; Niccolo Capurro; Pisa (1845).
- History of Painting in Italy illustrated by its monuments Volume 3 (translated), Pisa (1850)
- La Poesia, la Musica, e la Danza, Versi, Tipi Bodoniani, Parma (1796)
- Saggio sugli amori di Torquato Tasso e sulle cause della sua prigionia, Presso Niccolo Capurro, Pisa (1832)
