= Pier Francesco Giambullari =

Italian scholar

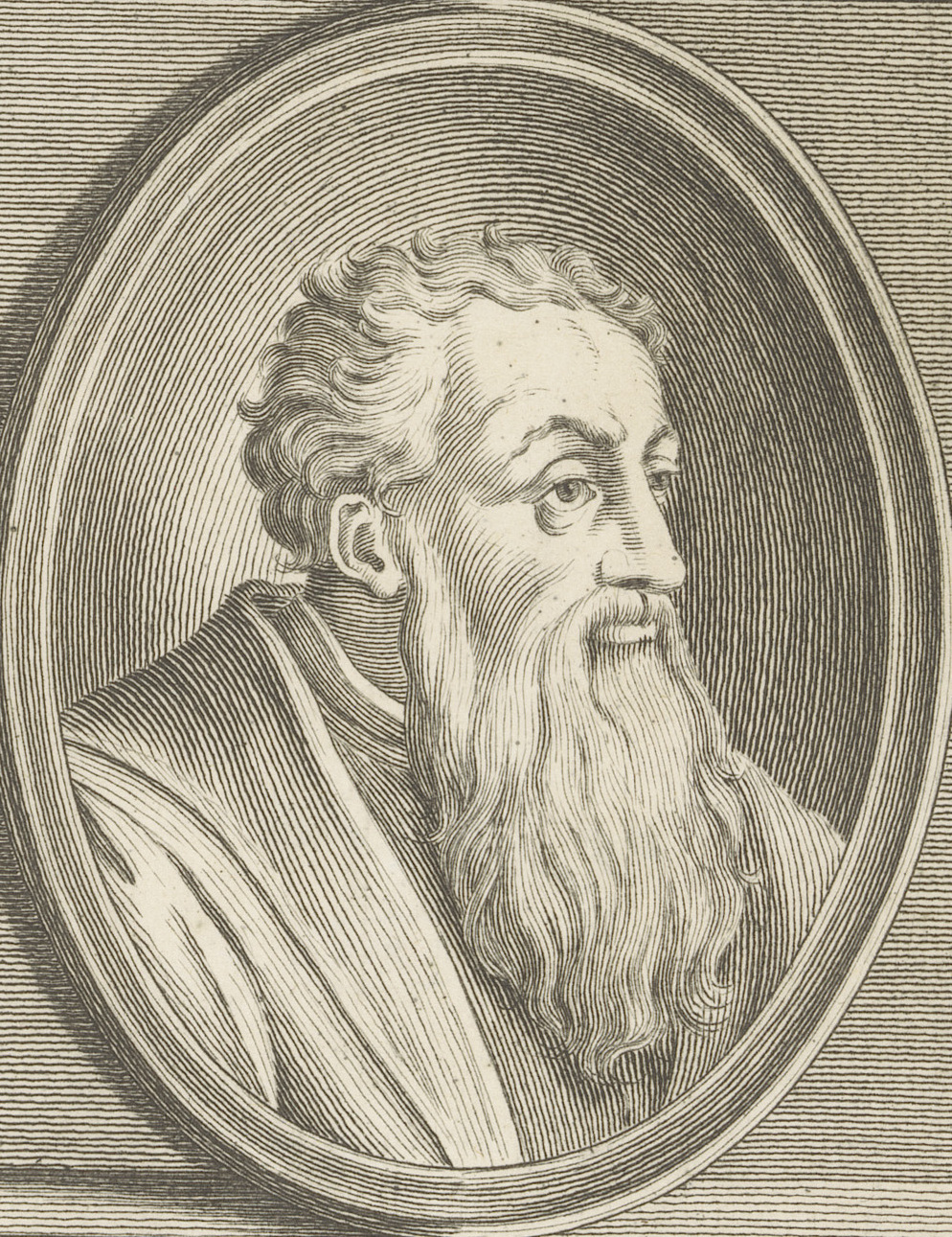
- Pier Francesco Giambullari
- Born: 1495; Florence, Republic of Florence
- Died: 24 August 1555 (aged 59–60); Florence, Republic of Florence
- Occupations: Catholic priest writer, philologist
- Parent(s): Bernardo Giambullari and Lucrezia Giambullari (née degli Stefani)

Academic background
- Influences: Dante Alighieri; Giambattista Gelli

Academic work
- Era: Renaissance
- Discipline: Linguistics; Philology; Medieval history
- Sub-discipline: Historical linguistics
- Notable works: Il Gello (1547); Historia dell'Europa (1556)

Pier Francesco Giambullari (1495 – 24 August 1555) was a Florentine Catholic priest, man of letters and Renaissance humanist.

== Biography ==
Pier Francesco Giambullari was born in Florence in 1495, the son of Bernardo Giambullari, prominent as a writer of light poetry, who had enjoyed official favor under Lorenzo il Magnifico and would again under Pope Leo X. The son received an excellent humanistic education that included instruction in Hebrew and Greek as well as in Latin. He was a scholar rather than a poet, and like his father he benefited from the patronage of the ruling family. At age sixteen he became the secretary of Alfonsina Orsini, daughter-in-law of Il Magnifico and mother of Lorenzo de' Medici, Duke of Urbino. While very young he took holy orders, which made it possible for him later to be given a valued ecclesiastical post at San Lorenzo, the Medici family church. By 1539, despite a lack of published literary accomplishments, he was already known in the Florentine scholarly and literary world. In 1540 he became an early member of the Umidi and thus, the next year, a founding member of the Accademia Fiorentina. That body published in 1547 a volume of public lectures on Dante, of which two were by Giambullari. Three years earlier, he had written a quaint little treatise on the size and location of the Inferno. He was elected thirteenth consul of the learned society in 1547; in 1551 it gave him the title, "Reformer of the Language."

The Academy's admiration for Dante and its frequent lessons on his poem were in fact closely related to the championship of Tuscan, and more particularly Florentine, as a national literary language for prose. This good cause was destined to triumph. Giambullari and his close friend Giambattista Gelli, led the scholarly campaign. In 1547 the former published a work called Il Gello after his colleague, with whom he pretends to have a conversation. Here, in defense of Tuscan, is put forth the astonishing theory that the dialect derived from Hebrew, via Etruscan. This bizarre conception - which makes us realize the primitive state of historical philology in the Renaissance - was doubtless born of a desire to draw support from Dante, who had declared in his De vulgari eloquentia that Hebrew was the best of languages because it had been given directly to Adam and Eve by God. In 1551, under the Academy's auspices, Giambullari published a new linguistic work, a sort of Tuscan grammar, Della lingua che si parla e si scrive in Firenze. Bound together with it was a treatise by Gelli called Ragionamento sopra le difficoltà di metter in regole la nostra lingua, in which the author proposed living Florentine, rather than a fixed language, as the literary standard of the country.

Giambullari's most enduring work was, however, in the field of history: an unfinished Storia dell'Europa, published in 1556, a year after his death. The account begins in A.D. 887 and extends only to 947, but the enterprise of treating the whole of Europe - even for a short period - was nevertheless ambitious in a nearly unprecedented way. Giambullari wished to portray the time in which Latin and Germanic cultures began to fuse to form medieval civilization. The expository style of this book is unusually vivid and clear.

Giambullari is considered, in fact, to, have been one of the clearest writers of prose in the Cinquecento, which was itself perhaps the period that was most important for the development of Italian prose style.

== Works ==
- De'l sito, forma e misura dello Inferno di Dante. Florence: Neri Dortelata. 1544.
- Origine della lingua fiorentina, altrimenti il Gello. Florence: Lorenzo Torrentino. 1549; republished in the anthology Degli autori del ben parlare. Vol. 6. Venice: Salicata. 1648.
- De la Lingua che si parla e scrive in Firenze et uno dialogo di Giovan Batista Gelli sopra la difficultà dello ordinare detta lingua. Florence: Lorenzo Torrentino. 1551.
- Lezzioni, lette nella accademia Fiorentina sopra alcuni luoghi di Dante. Florence: Lorenzo Torrentino. 1551.
- In difesa della lingua fiorentina, et di Dante. Con le regole da far bella et numerosa la prosa. Florence: Lorenzo Torrentino. 1556.
- Historia delle cose accadute in Europa dall'anno 800 sino al 913 di nostra salute. Venice: Francesco Senesi. 1566.
- Ilaria Bonomi, ed. (1986). Regole della lingua fiorentina. Florence: Accademia della Crusca.

== Bibliography ==
- Dolci, Giulio; Lupo Gentile, Michele (1932). "GIAMBULLARI, Pier Francesco". Enciclopedia Italiana. Rome: Istituto dell'Enciclopedia Italiana.
- Fiorelli, Piero (1956). "Pier Francesco Giambullari e la riforma dell'alfabeto". Studi di filologia italiana. 14: 177–210.
- Croce, Benedetto (1958). "Pier Francesco Giambullari". Poeti e scrittori del pieno e del tardo Rinascimento. Vol. 2 (2nd ed.). Bari: Laterza.
- Perna, Ciro (1982). "«Esponendo la lettera con la lettera» : la doppia redazione del commento a 'Inf.', I, di Pierfrancesco Giambullari". Rivista di studi danteschi: Periodico semestrale. XXI (2): 310–378. doi:10.1400/291691.
- D'Alessandro, Alessandro (1980). "Il Gello di Pierfrancesco Giambullari. Mito e ideologia nel principato di Cosimo I". La nascita della Toscana. Florence: Leo S. Olschki.
- D'Alessandro, Alessandro (1980). "Il mito dell'origine 'aramea' di Firenze in un trattatello di Giambattista Gelli". Archivio Storico Italiano. 138 (3): 339–389.
- Bonomi, Ilaria (1985). "Giambullari e Varchi grammatici nell'ambiente linguistico fiorentino". La Crusca nella tradizione letteraria e linguistica italiana. Florence: Presso l'Accademia [della Crusca].
- Richardson, Brian (2002). "Giambullari, Pier Francesco". The Oxford Companion to Italian Literature. Oxford: Oxford University Press. ISBN 978-0-19-818332-7.
- Eisenbichler, Konrad (2006). "Pier Francesco Giambullari". In Gaetana Marrone; Paolo Puppa (eds.). Encyclopedia of Italian Literary Studies. Routledge. pp. 839–842. ISBN 978-1135455309.
- Vitali, Francesco (2011). Pierfrancesco Giambullari e la prima storia d'Europa dell'età moderna. Milan: FrancoAngeli. ISBN 978-8856835830.
