= Artichoke production in Italy =

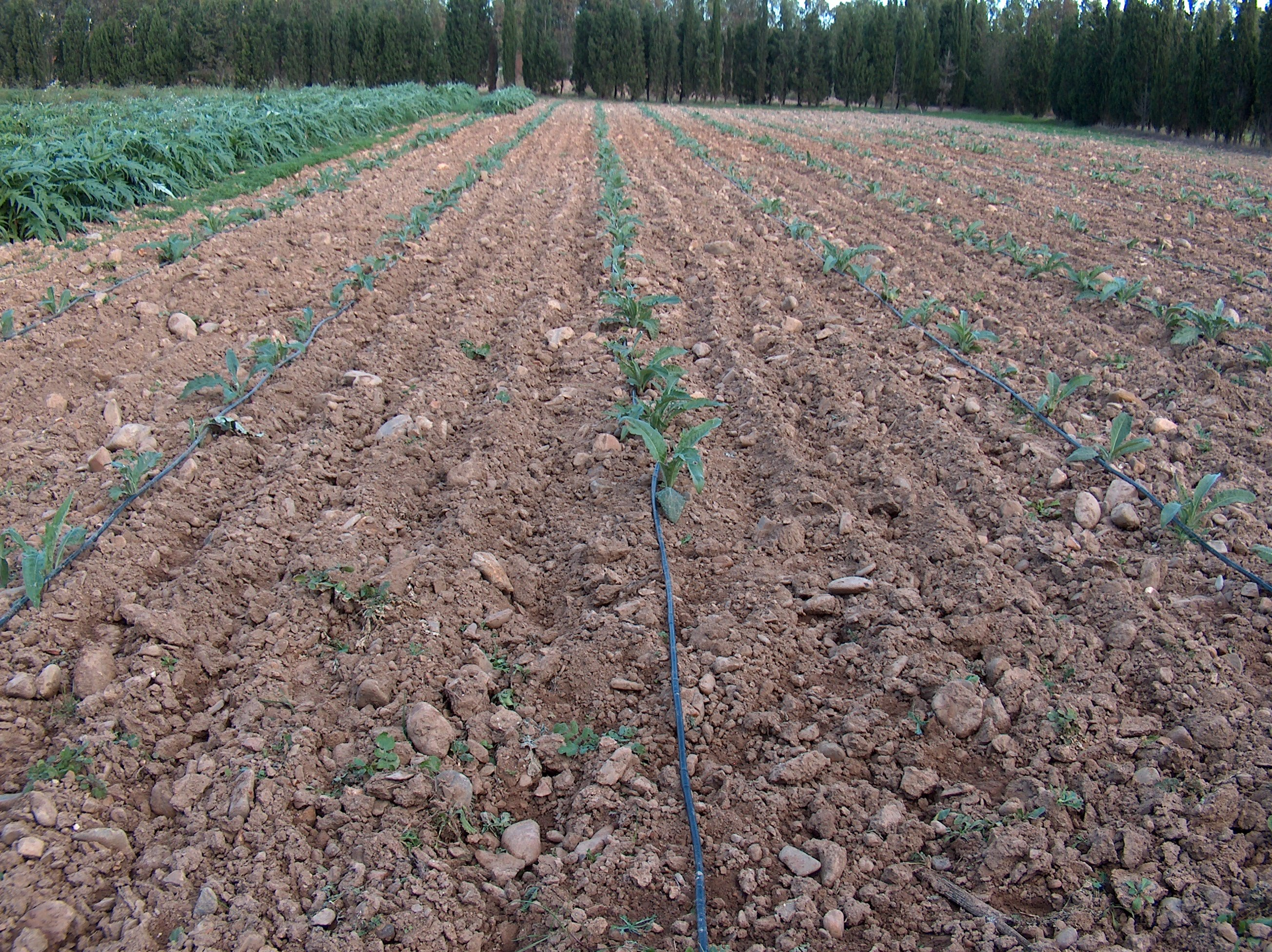
An artichoke field in Sardinia, Italy.

Artichoke production in Italy has a long history. Italy is the world's largest producer of artichokes. With Spain and France, the three countries produce more than 80% of the world's artichokes.

== History ==
There are two theories as to its origin: artichokes may have come from the Levant, derived from the cardoon or thistle through a cross-fertilization process, while others attribute it to the work of Italian horticulturists. The first record of artichoke cultivation in Italy was during the fifteenth century in Naples, where it was considered a new food species.

In 1466, Filippo Strozzi brought the first artichoke to Florence. By 1473, it had arrived in Venice. In 1915, 64,000 tons were produced. Italy produces dozens of varieties.
