= Luisa Strozzi =

Florentine noblewoman

- Born: Luisa Strozzi; Florence, Republic of Florence, Italy
- Died: 4 December 1534; Florence, Republic of Florence, Italy
- Spouse(s): Luigi Capponi (m. 1533)
- Parents: Filippo Strozzi the Younger (father); Clarice de' Medici (mother)

Luisa Strozzi, also known as Luigia, was a Florentine Renaissance noblewoman, daughter of the prominent banker Filippo the Younger and of Clarice de' Medici, granddaughter of Lorenzo the Magnificent. She was married to Senator Luigi Capponi in 1533.

She was said to have been insulted by Giovanni Salviati, a close friend of Duke Alessandro de' Medici. After one such event, Salviati was ambushed and wounded at night by unknown assailants. Suspicion fell on the Strozzi, but no evidence was amassed.

Rebuffing his advances and those of the Duke, she was forced to flee Florence. It is said she was poisoned by agents of the Duke.

== Age ==
Her date of birth is not known. However, she was born after her sister Maria (13 August 1514) and her brother Leone (15 October 1515), placing her birth at August 1516 at the earliest. As girls in Florence were usually not married before the age of 13, Luisa was born in 1519 at the latest (her brother Roberto was born in 1520). By this calculation, Luisa was only between fifteen and eighteen years old at the time of her death.

== Literature ==
In 1832, a three volume tragic novel by Giovanni Rosini loosely based on the story was published.

In 1844 a lyrical tragedy Luisa Strozzi by Giovanni Peruzzini with music by Antonio Ronzi was performed in Venice. The story was also made by 1847 into an opera with Pietro Martini as librettist and Gualterio Sanelli as composer.
