= Clarice de' Medici =

Italian nobility

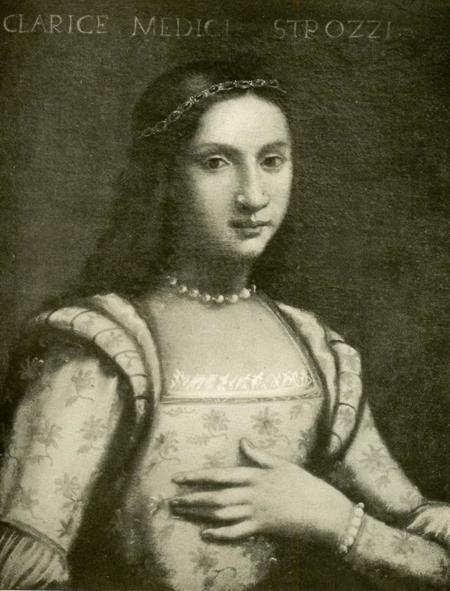
- Portrait of Clarice de' Medici
- Full name: Clarice di Piero de' Medici
- Born: 14 September 1489; Florence, Republic of Florence
- Died: 3 May 1528 (aged 38); Florence, Republic of Florence
- Noble family: Medici (birth); Strozzi (marriage)
- Spouse: Filippo Strozzi the Younger (m. 1508)
- Issue: Piero Strozzi; Maria Strozzi; Leone Strozzi; Luisa Strozzi; Roberto Strozzi; Maddalena Strozzi; Giulio Strozzi; Lorenzo Strozzi; Vincenzo Strozzi; Alessandro Strozzi
- Father: Piero the Unfortunate
- Mother: Alfonsina Orsini

Clarice di Piero de' Medici (14 September 1489 – 3 May 1528) was a member of the prominent Medici family, specially, she is the daughter of Piero di Lorenzo de' Medici and Alfonsina Orsini.

Born in Florence, she was the granddaughter of Lorenzo de' Medici, niece of Pope Leo X, and sister to Lorenzo II de' Medici. Following her brother's premature death in 1519, she educated his daughter Catherine, the future Queen of France.

In 1508, Clarice married Filippo Strozzi the Younger and moved to Rome. Filippo and Clarice had ten children:

- Piero Strozzi (1 March 1511 – 21 June 1558), condottiero and Marshal of France
- Maria Strozzi (13 August 1514, died between 1551 – 1575), married Lorenzo Ridolfi in 1529.
- Leone Strozzi (15 October 1515 – 28 June 1554), condottiero and Knight of Malta
- Luisa Strozzi (died 5 December 1534), married Senator Luigi Capponi in 1533.
- Roberto Strozzi (12 October 1520 – 1566), married Maddalena di Pierfrancesco de' Medici (Florence, c. 1523 - Rome, 14 April 1583), daughter of Pierfrancesco II de' Medici
- Maddalena Strozzi (1521–1596), married Count Flaminio dell'Anguillara in 1538.
- Giulio Strozzi (1522 – 14 December 1537)
- Lorenzo Strozzi (3 December 1523 – 14 December 1571), abbot and Cardinal
- Vincenzo Strozzi (died Rome, 1537). He was mad
- Alessandro Strozzi (died 31 October 1541)

She died in 1528 from either miscarriage or childbirth complications of a stillborn child

== Ancestry ==
Ancestors of Clarice de' Medici

16. Cosimo de' Medici
8. Piero de' Medici
17. Contessina de' Bardi
4. Lorenzo de' Medici
18. Francesco Tornabuoni
9. Lucrezia Tornabuoni
19. Nanna Guicciardini
2. Piero de' Medici
20. Orso Orsini, Lord of Monterotondo
10. Jacopo Orsini, Lord of Monterotondo
21. Lucrezia Conti
5. Clarissa Orsini
22. Carlo Orsini, Lord of Bracciano (= 12)
11. Maddalena Orsini
23. Paola Orsini (= 13)
1. Clarice de' Medici
24. Giovanni Orsini, Lord of Bracciano
12. Carlo Orsini, Lord of Bracciano
25. Bartolomea Spinelli
6. Roberto Orsini, Count of Tagliacozzo
26. Giacomo Orsini, Count of Tagliacozzo
13. Paola Orsini
27. Isabella Marzano
3. Alfonsina Orsini
28. Filippo Sanseverino, Count of Matera
14. Amerigo Sanseverino, Count of Capaccio
29. Elisabetta d'Aquino
7. Caterina Sanseverino
30. Antonio Sanseverino, Duke of San Marco
15. Margherita Sanseverino
31. Giovanna Orsini

== Sources ==
- Tomas, Natalie R. (2003). The Medici Women: Gender and Power in Renaissance Florence. Aldershot: Ashgate. ISBN 0754607771.
