= Giambattista Gelli =

Italian writer and scholar

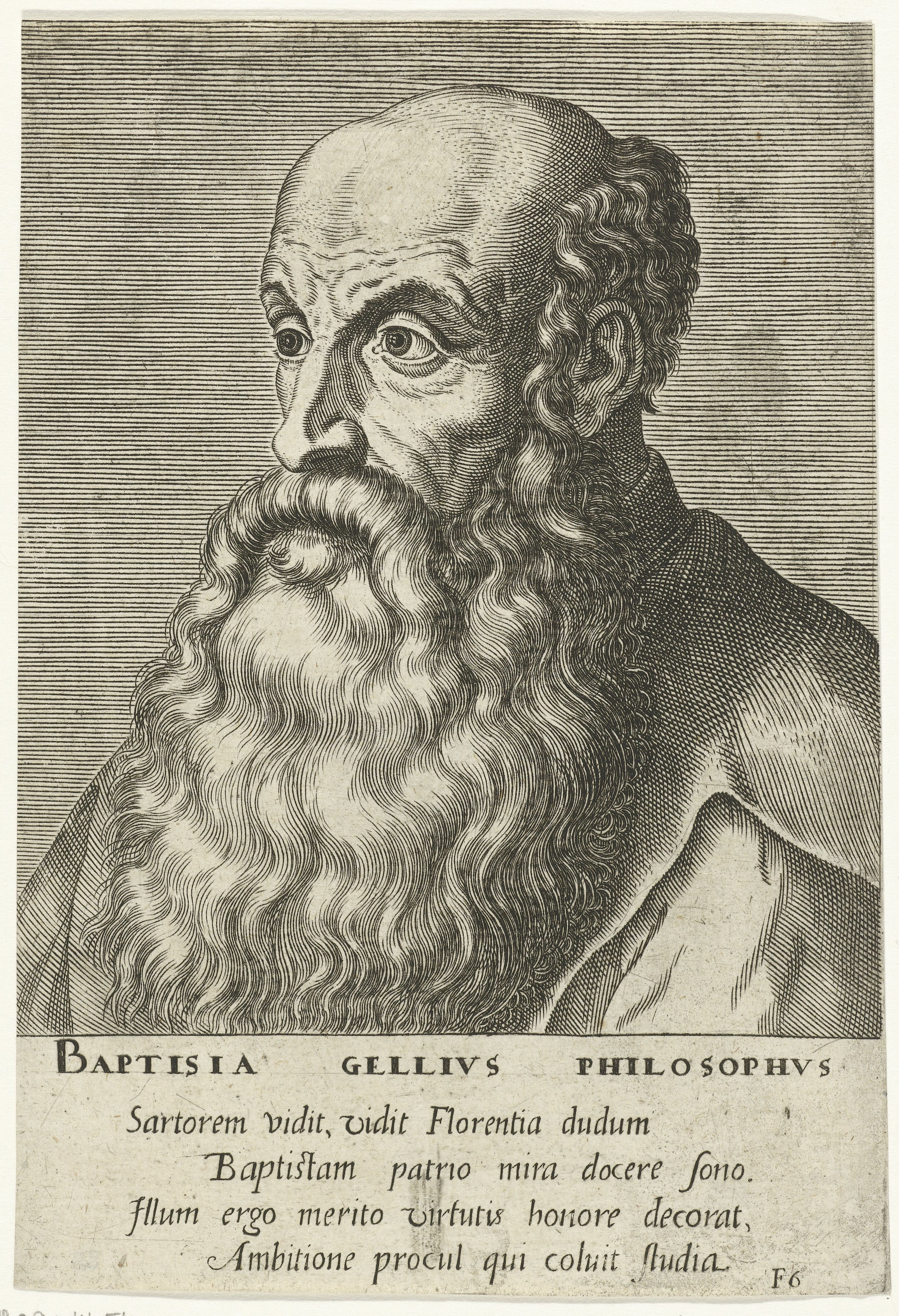
- Giambattista Gelli
- Born: August 12, 1498; Florence, Republic of Florence
- Died: 24 July 1563 (aged 64); Florence, Republic of Florence
- Occupations: Writer, philosopher
- Parent: Carlo di Bartolommeo (father)

Academic background
- Academic advisor: Francesco Verino
- Influences: Lucian; Dante Alighieri; Annius of Viterbo

Academic work
- Era: Renaissance
- Discipline: Ethics; Ancient history
- Notable works: I capricci di Giusto bottaio (1548); La Circe (1549)
- Influenced: Pier Francesco Giambullari; Guillaume Postel

Giambattista Gelli (12 August 1498 – 24 July 1563) was a Florentine man of letters, from an artisan background. Gelli was a shoemaker, and he used to publish dialogues. He is known for his works of the 1540s, Capricci del bottaio and La Circe, which are ethical and philosophical dialogues. Other works were the plays La sporta (1543) and L'errore (1556). He became a member of the Accademia Fiorentina on 25 December 1540.

In his historical writings, Gelli was influenced by the late 15th-century forgeries of Annio da Viterbo, which purported to provide evidence from ancient texts to show that Tuscany had been founded by Noah and his descendants after the Deluge.

== Biography ==
Giambattista Gelli was born of humble parents at Florence in 1498, and was brought up a tailor. As a youth, he studied literature and philosophy, and attended some of the celebrated humanist seances in the Orti Oricellari. According to Jacques Auguste de Thou Gelli did not understand Latin, but this must be a mistake, as he translated, from Latin into Italian, “The Life of Alphonsus duke of Ferrara,” by Paolo Giovio, and a treatise of Simone Porzio, “De Coloribus Oculorum”. His knowledge of Greek, however, was probably limited, as he translated the “Hecuba” of Euripides into Italian, from the Latin version. He excelled, however, in his native tongue, and acquired the highest reputation by the works he published in it. He was acquainted with all the learned men of Florence; and his merit was universally known. He was made a member of the Accademia Fiorentina and the city conferred him Florentine citizenship. Yet he continued to work as shoemaker and tailor until the end of his life. He died in Florence on 24 July 1563.

== Works ==
Gelli wrote two comedies (La sporta, 1543; L'errore, 1556), a few poems, and a Trattatello sull'origine di Firenze, but his most significant works are two treatises in dialogue form. I capricci di Giusto bottaio (1548; tr. W. Barker, The Fearful Fansies of the Florentine Couper, 1568), which incurred the Church's displeasure, conveys in ten dialogues between a Florentine cooper and his soul a commonsense exhortation to all men, even the humblest, to seek the truth. The better-known Circe (1549; tr. T. Brown, 1702, repr. ed. R. Adams, Ithaca, N.Y., 1963) contains 10 discussions on the human condition between Odysseus and eleven former human beings who have been turned into animals. Ten reject the prospect of returning to their human lives, but the elephant, who had been a philosopher, accepts Odysseus's view; the last dialogue celebrates the nobility of man's intellect. The Circe has been translated into Latin, French, and English. These dialogues, like the rest of Gelli’s, are written in the manner of Lucian. We have too by him, Le Lettioni nell'Academia Fiorentina, 1551. These dissertations regard the poems of Dante and Petrarch. Lastly, he published several letters upon Dante’s Inferno, entitled Ragionamento sopra le Difficultà del mettere in Regole la nostra lingua, without date.

== Historical theories ==
Gelli's wrote an important historical treatise, the Trattatello sull'origine di Firenze. The work is based on the questionable findings of the Renaissance scholar Annius of Viterbo. According to Gelli, Florence was founded long before the time of Sulla and the First Triumvirate. Tuscany was the first Italian region to be inhabited, but since the first inhabitants of Italy, who spoke Aramaic, had probably left no documents, the origin of Florence could not be traced.

After the death of Noah and after the various wars among the early inhabitants of Italy there came from Egypt Hercules Libius, the great grandson of Noah. Hercules founded Florence by cutting through Mt. Gonfolina, which allowed the water of the swamps to converge forming a river, and named the river after his coat of arms «Arno», which in Aramaic means «Lion», the symbol of Florence.

As to the origin of the Florentine language Gelli maintains, contrary to what we know today, that Etruscan and Hebrew are both descendants of Aramaic, one originating in Tuscany, the other in Palestine. Etruscan, says Gelli, was spoken in Italy long before Latin, and Florentine was derived from both these languages. He adds that the nouns in Italian are used according to the Aramaic languages; that is, they are not declined but are distinguished by the preceding article as is the case with Hebrew. The verbs, on the other hand, are conjugated according to the custom of the Latins.

Gelli supports his theory by pointing out names of places such as Carrara, Arignano, Arezzo, Fiesole, by asserting that there are many Florentine words which are derivatives of Aramaic and Hebrew. For example, he says the word «iano» is both Aramaic and Hebrew and is related to the word «vino», which comes from «iain», which in Aramaic means wine. In addition to linguistic sources he also claims as evidence for his hypothesis folklore material as well as remains of ancient structures such as temples, aqueducts, bridges, tombs, and so forth.

In his treatise Gelli emphasizes the cyclical feature of historical development, vaguely foreshadowing Vico, and maintains that when the civilization of a people has reached its peak it declines to its original state and then starts all over again. He rejects the claim that the Greeks are the fathers of civilization, and endeavors to prove that Italy and other countries were civilized long before Greece.

Gelli's theories were passionately received by the French linguist Guillaume Postel, who, in his essay De Etruriae regionis originibus, institutis, religione et moribus (1551) claimed that the Etruscan language originates from the Hebrew spoken by Noah and his descendants.

== Criticisms ==
Gelli's theories not only aroused the objective criticism of Vincenzo Borghini, but they provoked dissension among the members of the Accademia Fiorentina during the early years of its history. The harshest opponent of Gelli and his followers, known as gli Aramei, was the Florentine scholar and writer Antonio Francesco Grazzini. In 1546 Grazzini was expelled from the Accademia Fiorentina because of his ruthless criticism of the Aramei. He was readmitted only in 1566, when his friend Lionardo Salviati became consul.

== List of works ==
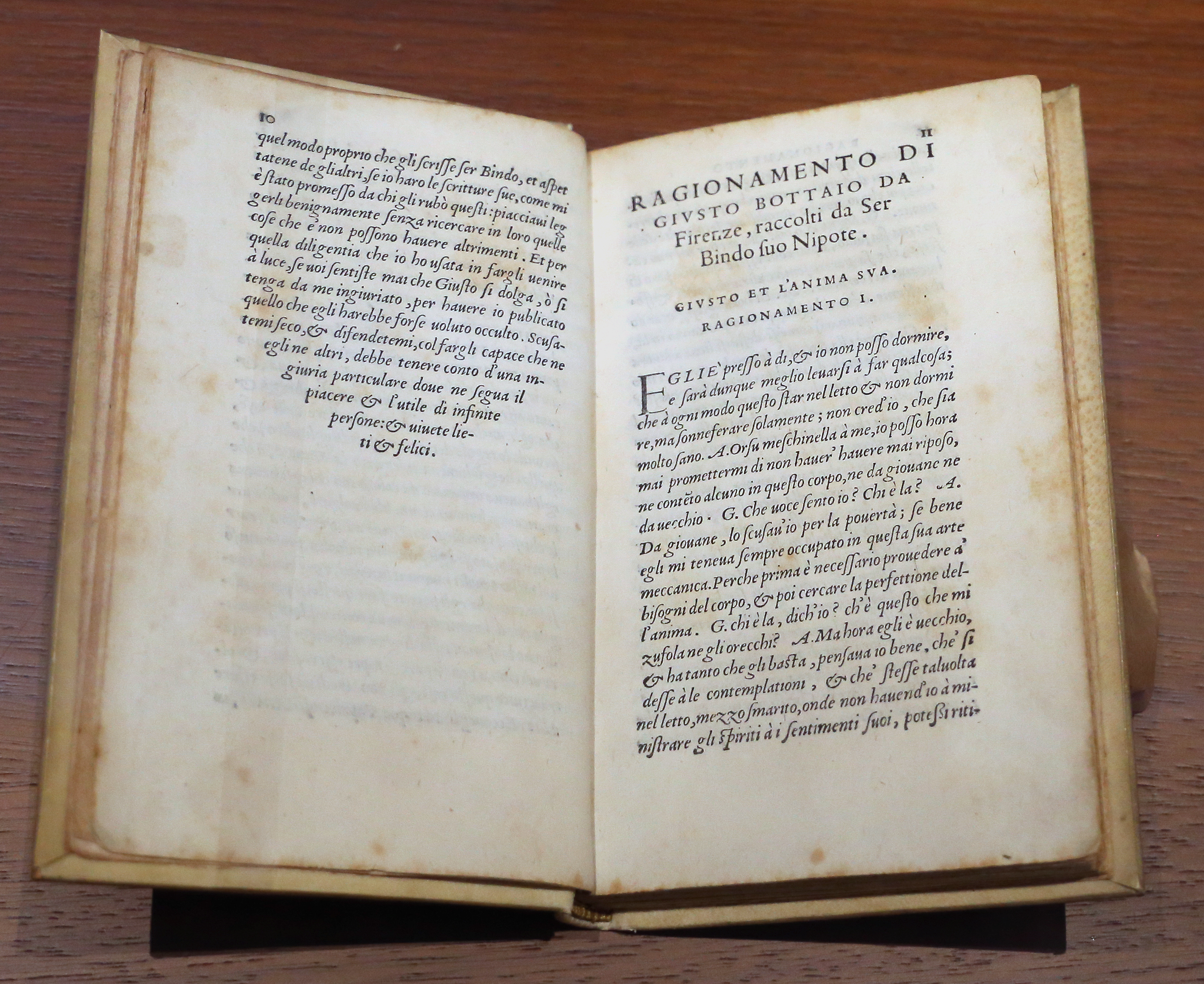
Giambattista Gelli, I capricci del bottaio, Florence, Torrentino 1549

- L'apparato et feste nelle nozze dello Illustrissimo Signor Duca di Firenze et della Duchessa sua Consorte, 1539;
- Egloga per il felicissimo giorno 9 di gennaio nel quale lo Eccellentissimo Signor Cosimo fu fatto Duca di Firenze, 1542;
- La sporta, 1543;
- Dell'origine di Firenze, 1544;
- I capricci del bottaio, 1546-1548;
- La Circe, 1549;
- Ragionamento sopra la difficultà di mettere in regole la nostra lingua, 1551;
- Lo errore, 1556;
- Polifila, 1556.
- Dell’origine di Firenze. Introduzione, testo inedito e note a cura di A. D’Alessandro, in «Atti e Memorie dell’Accademia toscana di scienze e lettere La Colombaria», XLIV, n.s. XXX (1979).

== Bibliography ==
- Ugolini, Aurelio (1898). Le Opere di Giambattista Gelli. Pisa: Francesco Mariotti.
- Chiurlo, Bindo (1932). "GELLI, Giambattista". Enciclopedia Italiana. Rome: Istituto dell'Enciclopedia Italiana.
- De Gaetano, Armand L. (1967). "G. B. Gelli and the Rebellion Against Latin". Studies in the Renaissance. 14: 131–158. doi:10.2307/2857164. JSTOR 2857164.
- De Gaetano, Armand L. (1976). Giambattista Gelli and the Florentine Academy: The rebellion against Latin. Firenze: Leo S. Olschki. ISBN 978-8822222251.
- Alessandro D'Alessandro (1980). "Il mito dell'origine « aramea » di Firenze in un trattatello di Giambattista Gelli". Archivio Storico Italiano. 138 (3): 339–389. JSTOR 26259494.
- Rossi, P. (2002). "Gelli, Giovan Battista". The Oxford Companion to Italian Literature. Oxford University Press.
