= Strozzi family =

Florentine noble family

Strozzi family Coat of Arms.

The House of Strozzi is an ancient patrician (later noble with princely and ducal titles) Florentine family, who like their great rivals the House of Medici, began in banking before moving into politics. Until its exile from Florence in 1434, the Strozzi family was by far the richest in the city, and was rivaled only by the Medici family, who ultimately took control of the government and ruined the Strozzi both financially and politically. This political and financial competition was the origin of the Strozzi-Medici rivalry. Later, while the Medici ruled Florence, the Strozzi family ruled Siena, which Florence attacked, causing great animosity between the two families. Soon afterward, the Strozzi married into the Medici family, essentially giving the Medici superiority.

== History ==
Palla Strozzi (1372–1462) neglected the family bank, but played an important part in the public life of Florence, and founded the first public library in Florence in the monastery of Santa Trinita, as well as commissioning the important Strozzi Altarpiece of the Adoration of the Magi by Gentile da Fabriano. He played a leading part in forcing the exile of Cosimo de' Medici in 1433, but after Cosimo's pardon a year later, was himself exiled, and never returned.

Bust of Niccolò Strozzi by Mino da Fiesole, 1454 (Berlin, Bode Museum)

Filippo Strozzi il Vecchio (1428–1491), son of Matteo Strozzi and of Alessandra Macinghi, was exiled as a young man and became a successful banker in Naples. He was also a condottiero or leader of mercenary soldiers and after his reconciliation with the Medici and return in 1466, began the Palazzo Strozzi, which was finished by his son Filippo II.

Filippo II (1488–1538) is probably the most well known member of the family. Although married to Clarice de' Medici, a daughter of Piero di Lorenzo de' Medici and thereby a member of the Medici family, he was vehemently opposed to the hegemony the Medicis had acquired as the unofficial rulers of the Florentine republic and was among the leaders of the uprising of 1527. Michelangelo's Doni Tondo probably was commissioned by Agnolo Doni to commemorate his marriage to Maddalena Strozzi.

After the republic was overthrown in 1530 Alessandro de' Medici attempted to win Filippo Strozzi's support, but Strozzi declined and instead, retired to Venice. After the murder of Alessandro in 1537, Strozzi assumed leadership of a group of republican exiles with the object of re-entering the city but having been captured and subsequently tortured he committed suicide.

Filippo Strozzi's older son Piero (1500–1558), married Laudomia de' Medici, and fought in Scotland against the English, as well as in France against the Holy Roman Empire and Spain, and was made a Marshal of France in 1554. He took part in the French siege of Calais (1557), and died of wounds incurred in battle at Thionville, in Lorraine, in 1558. A younger son Leone (1515–1554) was a distinguished admiral in the service of France and fought against the Medici. He died of a wound received while attacking Sarlino in 1554. Another son, Lorenzo Strozzi (1513–1571) went into the Church, also in France, and ended as a cardinal and Archbishop of Siena from 1565. The son of Piero, Filippo di Piero Strozzi (1541–1582) was born in exile in France and served as a royal page and then in the French army, before being captured and killed by the Spaniards at the Battle of Terceira.

== Later family members ==
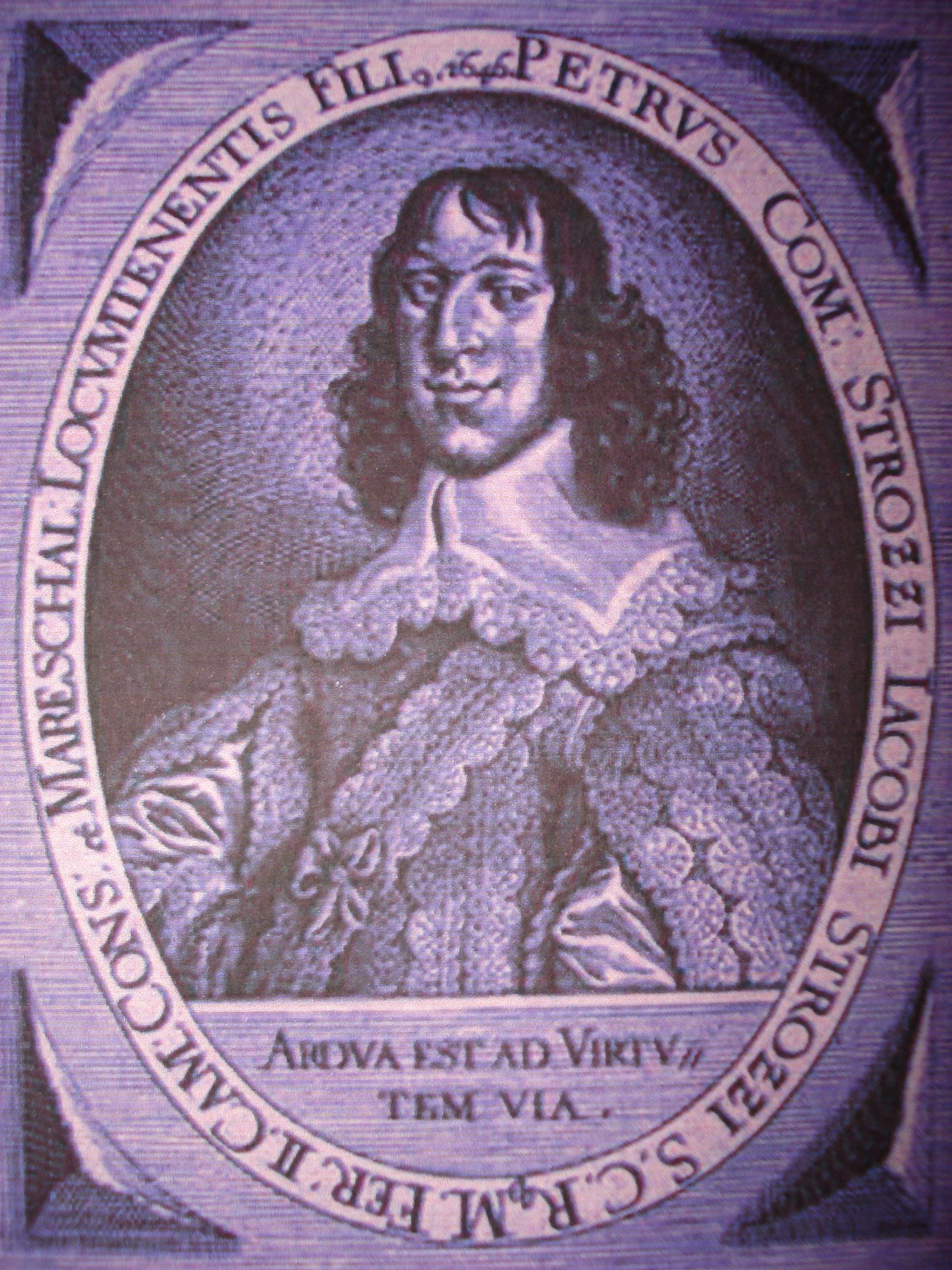
Count Peter Strozzi (1626–1664), Austrian general, killed by the Ottomans during the Siege of Novi Zrin (1664)

It is unclear whether Bernardo Strozzi (c.1581–1644), a prominent and prolific Italian Baroque painter born and active mainly in Genoa and Venice, was a part of this immediate family.

Senator Carlo Strozzi (1587–1671) formed an important library and collected a valuable miscellany known as the Carte Strozziane, of which the most important part is now in the state archives of Florence. He was the author of a Storietta della città di Firenze dal 1219 al 1292 (unpublished) and a Storia della casa Barberini (Rome, 1640).

The poet Giulio Strozzi was a member of the family. He adopted the composer Barbara Strozzi (1619–1677), who presumably was his natural daughter.

The Strozzi acquired by marriage the titles of Princes of Forano and Dukes of Bagnolo. A branch of the family moved to Vienna and built the Palais Strozzi there. The Palazzo Strozzi in Florence belonged to the family until 1937 when it was sold to the Istituto Nazionale delle Assicurazioni (INA). From 1999 it became property of the Italian State.

They also owned the Palazzo Strozzi Morosini in Venice, Palazzo Strozzi in Lombardy, Villa Strozzi, Villino Strozzi, Palazzo Strozzi Bevilacqua, Palazzo Strozzi alle Stimmate, Palazzo Nonfinito, Palazzo Strozzi di Mantova, Palazzo Strozzi del Poeta, and Palazzo dello Strozzino.

Today, Strozzi descendants are still living in Florence and elsewhere, including in America.

The Villa Cusona is the Tuscan home of the family, operated as a vineyard by Prince Girolamo Strozzi and his family.

== Sources ==
- Goldthwaite, Richard A. (2015). Private Wealth in Renaissance Florence. Princeton Legacy Library. Princeton University Press. p. 30. ISBN 978-1-4008-7862-8.
