= Battle of Vila Franca do Campo =

16th-century naval battle between Spain and France

Coordinates: 38.644°N 27.653°W

Battle of Ponta Delgada
- Part of the War of the Portuguese Succession
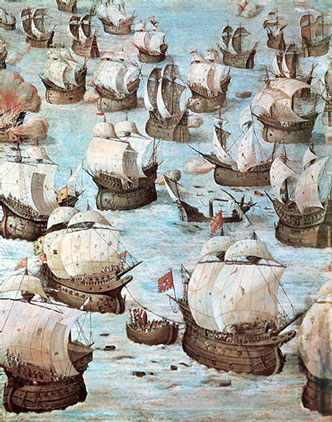
- Fresco by Niccolò Granello showing the Battle of Ponta Delgada in the Hall of Battles at El Escorial
Date	26 July 1582
Location	Off São Miguel Island, Azores Islands
Result	Spanish victory

Belligerents
(Spain) Spanish Empire; Portugal	France; England; Pro–Crato Portugal

Commanders and leaders
(Spain) Álvaro de Bazán	(Kingdom of France) Piero Strozzi (POW)

Strength
28 warships	60 warships

Casualties and losses
224 dead, 550 wounded	1,500 dead, 1,500 wounded, missing or captured, 7 ships missing, 4 ships sunk, 2 ships burned, 4 ships captured

The naval Battle of Vila Franca do Campo, also known as Battle of Ponta Delgada and Naval Battle of Terceira Island, took place on 26 July 1582, off the coast of the island of São Miguel in the Portuguese archipelago of the Azores, during the War of the Portuguese Succession. A combined corsair expedition, mainly French (a French, and English fleet with Portuguese forces included), sailed against a Spanish naval force made up of Portuguese and Castilian ships, to preserve control of the Azores under the pretender António, Prior of Crato and to defend the islands from incorporation into the Iberian Union, the largest French force sent overseas before the age of Louis XIV.

In the first engagement between large fleets of carracks and galleons operating at great distances from the mainland, the mercenary fleet under Filippo di Piero Strozzi was severely defeated by a squadron under Álvaro de Bazán. The Spanish victory resulted in the rapid Spanish conquest of the Azores and completed the incorporation of Portugal into the Spanish Empire.

== Background ==
The only portion of the Portuguese overseas empire to resist the Habsburg King Philip II of Spain (Philip I of Portugal) were the Azores Islands. The French crown sent a fleet under the command of the mercenary admiral Filippo Strozzi in order to help defend the islands.

King Philip had offered an amnesty to the nine islands if they would surrender, but his messenger met with a very hostile reception at Angra, and retired to the island of São Miguel, which had presented its allegiance to the King of Spain and Portugal.

While a fleet was prepared at Lisbon to subdue the nine islands, a Spanish commander sent out to escort the incoming treasure fleet, Pedro Valdés, was ordered to deliver a new offer of pardon, but on no account to begin hostilities until the necessary force was assembled. However, receiving the same replies the former envoy, Valdés was persuaded to attempt an assault on Terceira. At what became known as the Battle of Salga, his landing-force of 600 men met with a savage welcome; the half-wild bulls of the island were driven into them and they were cut to pieces as they fled to the ships.

Meanwhile, António reached Calais and proceeded to England. Walsingham and Burghley favoured the sending of an expedition to the Azores: the Count of Vimioso even made an agreement with Drake and Hawkins, but Elizabeth was unwilling to make war on Philip, and António returned to France.

== Battle ==
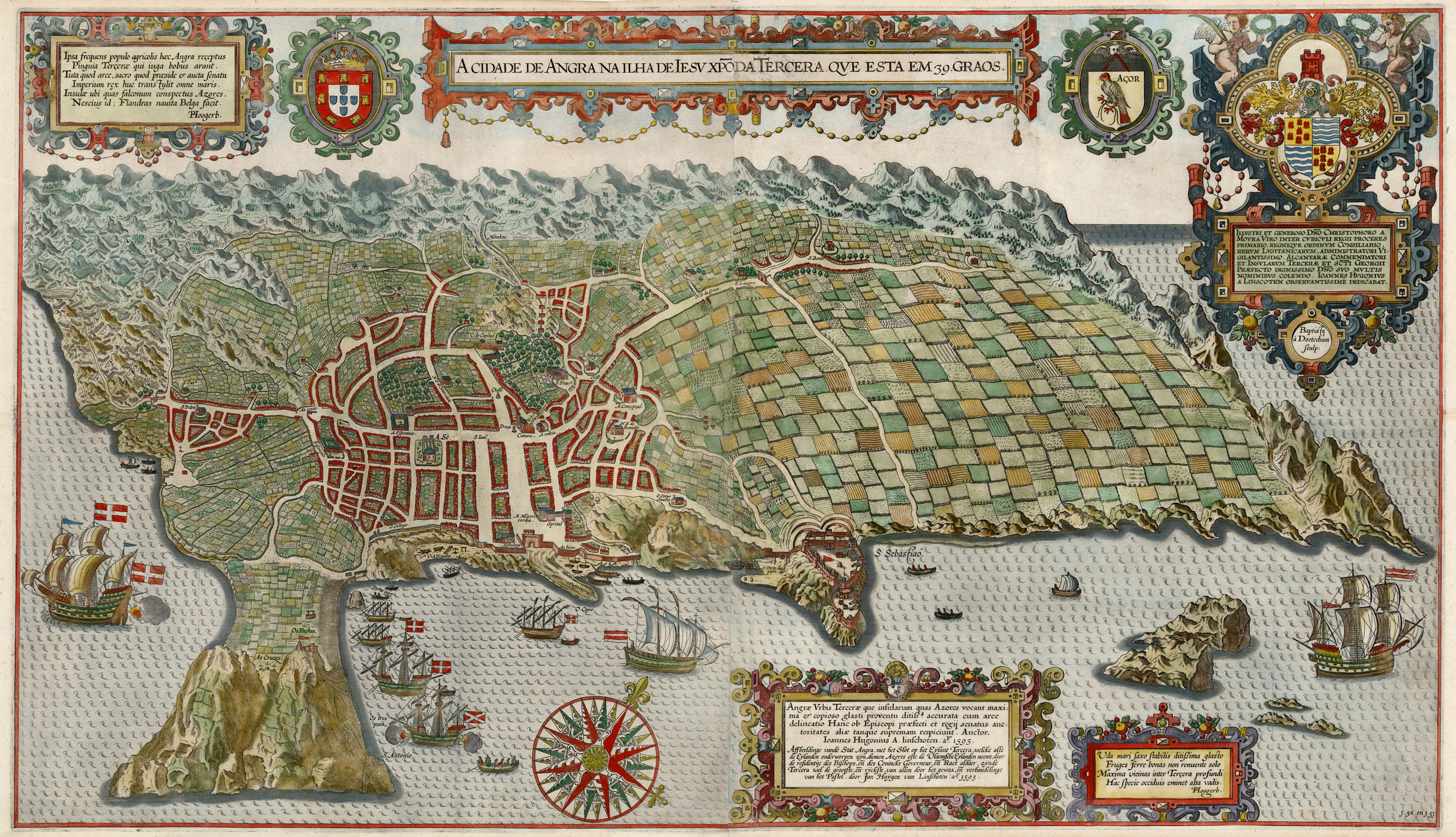
Map of Terceira. By Jan Huygen van Linschoten

In June 1582 António's French fleet left Belle-Isle, intending to subdue the two islands of São Miguel and Santa Maria and to capture the treasure fleet which would probably put in at the Azores. However, on learning that Strozzi had sailed, Álvaro de Bazán, Marquess of Santa Cruz also made for the Azores with fewer ships but larger in size and arms than Strozzi and about an equal number of men. He arrived too late to prevent the French from landing on São Miguel, but in time to save the capital, Ponta Delgada.

After an indecisive gunfight on 24 July 1582 the fleets met two days later in a fierce close battle south of the island of São Miguel. The French initially had the advantage of the wind and attacked the Spanish rear with superior forces but that gave Bazán, the Spanish commander the opportunity to gain the wind for the Spanish vanguard which in its turn attacked the French. The Spanish were outnumbered two to one, the brunt of the French attack was borne by the Portuguese-built Spanish galleon San Mateo (São Mateus), a vessel of 750 tonnes armed with 30 guns. Although surrounded, battered by artillery, and boarded by several French ships, her sailors held their ground and repulsed all attacks. They then took the fight to the enemy, boarding and capturing two French vessels before the battle ended. Several French ships took flight. Santa Cruz began the action by arranging themselves in a line abreast.

This was the traditional tactic employed by the Spanish galleys, which carried their few cannon in the bow. Captain Diego de Medrano, squadron general of the Spanish galleys, arrived in 1583 to support Bazán and stood out in the front line during the conquest of Terceira Island. Medrano's galleys allowed for marine infantry to be used for the first time in order to occupy beaches and land. His innovation to the Spanish galleys allowed him the privilege of being the first to be seen on open water with this type of ship, something never accomplished before.

Álvaro de Bazán in his Portuguese-built flagship São Martinho sought out Strozzi's ship amid the smoke and chaos and, having found her, pounded her with gunfire until she was close to sinking. At the battle's close, the Pretender's fleet had lost 10 ships sunk or captured, and well over 1,000 men, including Strozzi, wounded to death by order of Bazán, and then, still breathing, thrown into the sea. Álvaro de Bazán defeated the French through a combination of gunfire and boarding.

Some thought that Strozzi had been unlucky to lose. His ships had proved nimbler than those of Álvaro de Bazán, and, like Hawkins at San Juan de Ulúa, they had used their artillery well, operating in mutually supporting groups of four to charge, and assail each of them one of the great vessels of the enemy. The Spanish fleet suffered severe damage, Philip II's commemorative mural in the Escorial's Hall of Battles correctly depicts extensive shot damage on the Spanish side. The galleon San Martín (São Martinho) barely managed to tow the captured enemy flagship back to port. On 26 July, after a five-hour naval engagement, the French and English fleets, weaker in battle-power, were routed; seventeen of their ships deserted. Men over seventeen who were captured were put to death as pirates. This sentence seemed very cruel to all, so some of the Spanish soldiers and captains came forward to plead to Álvaro de Bazán for mercy, and suggested that he make an exemption for the French prisoners by sparing their lives as prisoners of war. Álvaro de Bazan responded by saying that he was only executing the "mandates" of the King of France, that being at peace with Castile would not allow his subjects to act as armed pirates attacking the Spaniards.

== Aftermath ==
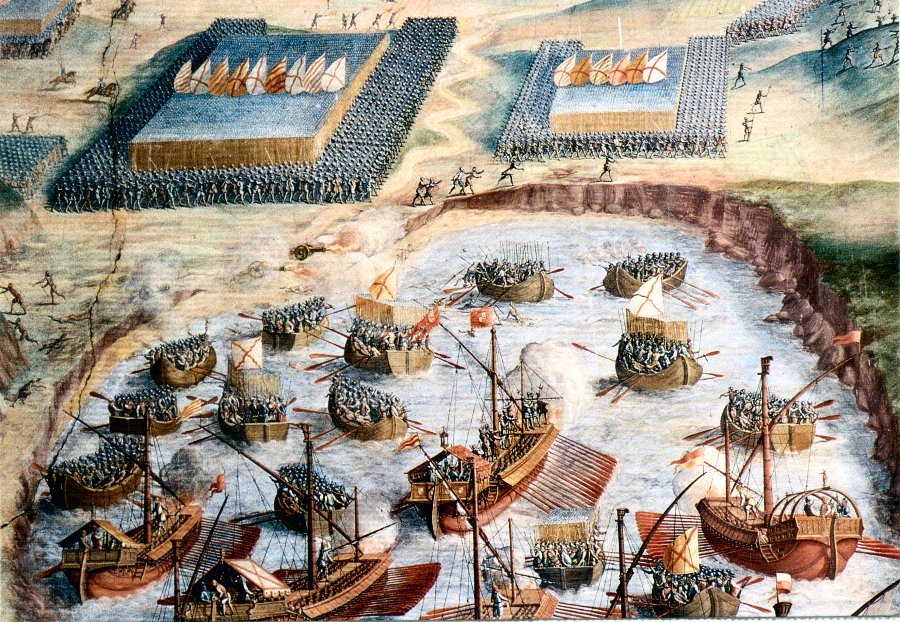
The Spanish Tercios landing on Terceira. El Escorial Hall of Battles

Though larger, the improvised French fleet had not been sufficient to challenge the Spanish in the Atlantic triangle. The magnitude of French losses is uncertain but they were heavy and decisive.

In spite of the effective use of artillery, the battle was largely decided in the traditional style of boarding the enemy, although the Portuguese were the first to understand the importance of naval artillery. Apparently, Strozzi ignored the Portuguese who were in his fleet and recommended the use of artillery in their line of battle tactic, as they were doing in the Indian Ocean (resolving many battles by gunnery alone), which would be adopted by the other Europeans in the 17th century. However, the battle shows that Strozzi tried, partly, an approximation to this tactic, by an attack by a group of naus engaged in formation.

The other problem for the French-allied fleet to win more easily with such tactical or approximate strategy, despite its numbers and the fact that several carracks in its fleet had more guns aboard than the galleon São Mateus, although the latter being robust and designed for greater maneuverability, was that of the Atlantic armed carracks, but especially, the Portuguese oceanic fighting galleons, were precisely incorporated into the Spanish fleet, and leading the fight (despite being only two, they would be decisive, being the other ships Portuguese and Castilian carracks, urcas and pataches). These galleons were also strongly armed—with its personnel and specialized bombardeiros or artilheiros—more suitable for such a strategy in the Atlantic high seas than other naus and galleons of more mixed-use, or the galleys (the widest Spanish resource for naval engagements until then). However, in the end, the battle was eventually largely resolved in the old way of naval warfare.

Álvaro de Bazán had won a great victory and jubilation at his triumphant return seems to have gripped the whole of Spain. The French ambassador at Philip II's court sourly reported that some Spaniards went so far as to claim that "even Christ was no longer safe in Paradise, for the marquis might go there to bring him back and crucify him all over again". Later some of this pride and passion turned against the vanquished: according to the same ambassador by October 1582 the Spaniards had taken to "spitting in the faces of any Frenchmen they happened to meet in the street."

Terceira remained in the Pretender's hands, and in the spring of 1583 he managed to reinforce his garrisons there with 800 fresh French troops. Bazan, who now enjoyed command of the sea, reacted swiftly. Secure within his Lisbon base he prepared an amphibious invasion of overwhelming force: 15,372 men and 98 ships, including 31 big merchantmen converted as troop transports, small vessels and landing craft, fighting galleons, 12 galleys, and 2 galleasses. This time his aim was not to fight a fleet but to land an army—the task force could certainly defend itself if necessary, but its primary role was to put troops, together with their supporting equipment and supplies, on a selected beach-head and then to back them up until the military objectives had been gained.

The Terceirans expected the Spaniards to land at the harbours of Angra and Peggia, and had disposed their forces accordingly. However, Santa Cruz decided to deliver his main thrust at Mole, a beach 10 miles from Angra defended only by light earthworks occupied by infantry with some artillery support. Bazan's own report of the landings describes the assault on the beaches:

"The flag galley began to batter and dismount the enemy artillery and the rest of the galleys did likewise.... the landing craft ran aground and placed soldiers on the flanks of the fortifications, and along the trenches, although with much difficulty and working under the pressure of the furious artillery, arquebus, and musket fire of the enemy. The soldiers mounting the trenches in several places came under heavy small-arms fire, but finally won the forts and trenches".

António himself was on Terceira, where he supervised the raising of levies for defense, but left in November to persuade the French to furnish another 1,500 men, who arrived in June 1583. Santa Cruz had increased his fleet to ninety-six ships and 9,500 men with a garrison of 2,000 on São Miguel. His lavish offers of mercy, marriage, and money for António's capitulation were refused, but after one day's fighting Terceira fell. French and English soldiers on the island were allowed to retire unharmed, but sixteen supporters of António, including Silva, who had tried to flee on the night of the attack, were executed. Dom António and a handful of his supporters were lucky to escape with their lives.

== Sources ==
- Parker, Geoffrey (1999). The Spanish Armada. Manchester, England: Mandolin Publishing, Manchester University Press. ISBN 1-901341-14-3.
- Hakluyt, Richard (1972). Vogayes and Discoveries. London, England: Penguin Classics.
- Brimancomble, Peter (2000). All the Queen's Men: The World of Elizabeth I. London, England. ISBN 0-312-23251-9.
- Konstam, Augus (25 March 2001). The Armada Campaign 1588: The Great Enterprise Against England. Osprey Publishing. ISBN 1-84176-192-3.
- Walton, Timothy (2002). The Spanish Treasure Fleets. Pineapple Press. ISBN 1-56164-049-2.
- Rodrigues, Jorge Nascimento; Devezas, Tessaleno (December 2007). Pioneers of Globalization: Why the Portuguese Surprised the World. Osprey Publishing. ISBN 978-989-615-056-3.
- Glete, Jan (2000). Warfare At Sea 1500-1650: Maritime Conflicts and the Transformation of Europe. London, England. ISBN 0-415-21454-8.
- Secretary of State for Information and Tourism. History of Portugal. Cambridge University Press.
- Rif Winfield, John Tredrea, Enrique García-Torralba Pérez, Manuel Blasco Felip (30 May 2023). Spanish Warships in the Age of Sail, 1700–1860: Design, Construction, Careers and Fates. Seaforth. ISBN 9781526790811.
- Winfield, Rif (2023). Spanish Warships in the Age of Sail. Seaforth. ISBN 9781526790798.
