= Filippo di Piero Strozzi =

Italian condottiero (1541–1582)

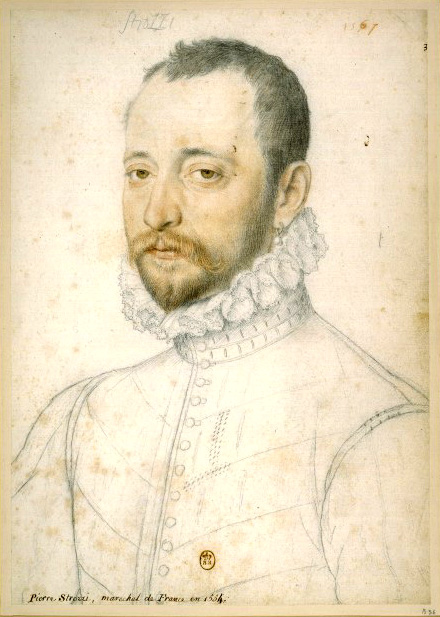
- Born: 1541; Florence, Italy
- Died: 27 July 1582 (aged 40–41); Azores
- Relatives: Piero Strozzi (father)
- Military career
- Allegiance: Kingdom of France
- Branch: French Army
- Service years: 1557–1582
- Rank: Colonel General
- Conflicts: Italian War of 1551–59; Great Siege of Malta; French Wars of Religion; War of the Portuguese Succession
- Awards: Order of the Holy Spirit

Filippo di Piero Strozzi (French: Philippe Strozzi; 1541 – 27 July 1582) was an Italian condottiero, a member of the Florentine family of the Strozzi. He fought mainly for France.

== Biography ==
He was born in Florence to Piero Strozzi and Laudomia de' Medici, a sister of Lorenzino de' Medici and Giuliano de' Medici, Archbishop of Albi. His father had been exiled from his native city and found refuge in France where Catherine de' Medici was queen. Piero would go on to be appointed as Marshal of France. His son Filippo became the page of the future king Francis II.

Coat of arms of Filippo Strozzi containing the Order of the Holy Spirit and the Order of Saint Michael.

In 1557, Strozzi entered the French army. Starting from the first battles in Piedmont, he fought in numerous battles of the 16th century. In 1558, he took part in the siege of Calais against England, where his father was killed soon afterward at the Siege of Thionville. In 1560, he was sent to Scotland to fight for the then-regent Mary of Guise against Elizabeth of England and was made lord of Épernay. Three years later he became colonel of the Royal Guards.

In 1564, he came to help Emperor Maximilian II during the Ottoman invasion in Hungary. The following year, he faced again the Ottomans at the siege of Malta. From there, he moved to Rome and called to counter the Turk menace in the Adriatic Sea, distinguishing himself in the defence of Ancona. He later fought also in Transylvania.

Returned to France in 1567, he fought against the Huguenots. Two years later, he became the sole Colonel General (commander-in-chief of the army) of France, and subsequently took part to the long siege of La Rochelle. He was accompanied by his friend Pierre de Bourdeille. In 1573, he fought alongside the House of Orange against the Spaniards.

In 1581, Filippo Strozzi exchanged the position of General Commander for that of lord of Bressuire and was called by António, Prior of Crato (Portuguese claimant to the Portuguese throne against Spanish Habsburg King Philip II) as a private mercenary. With a contingent of French, Dutch, English, and Portuguese volunteers, he set sail to the Azores, a Portuguese Atlantic territory that still did not recognize Philip II as king. His fleet was, however, destroyed in the Battle of Terceira (26 July 1582) by the Spanish-Portuguese navy under the admiral Álvaro de Bazán, 1st Marquis of Santa Cruz.

Taken prisoner, he was executed at age 42, by being wounded to death and then thrown into the sea from a Spanish ship, as a pirate. The harsh punishments meted out to the unfortunate Strozzi and captured members of his crews were carried out at the instructions of the Spanish admiral, despite much protest from his own crews.
