= Alfonsina Orsini =

Regent of the Republic of Firenze (1472–1520)

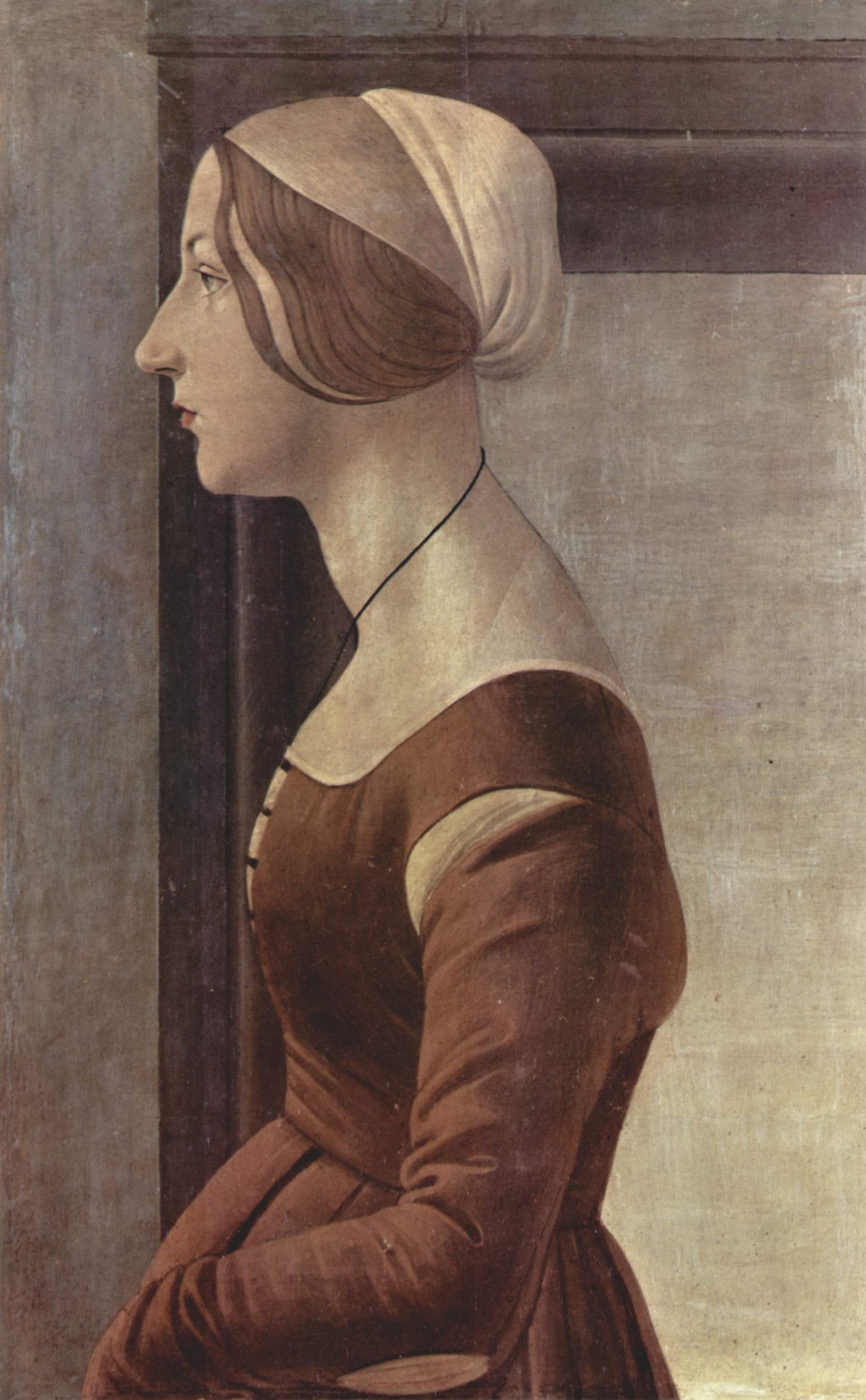
- Portrait of a woman considered to be Alfonsina Orsini, attributed to Sandro Botticelli
- Born: 1472
- Died: 7 February 1520 (aged 47–48); Rome, Papal States
- Buried: Basilica of Santa Maria del Popolo, Rome
- Noble family: Orsini (birth); Medici (marriage)
- Spouse: Piero di Lorenzo de' Medici (m. 1488; died 1503)
- Issue: Clarice de' Medici; Lorenzo de' Medici, Duke of Urbino; Luisa de' Medici
- Father: Roberto Orsini
- Mother: Caterina Sanseverino

Alfonsina Orsini (1472 – 7 February 1520) was a regent of Florence. She governed the Republic of Florence during the absences of her son, Lorenzo II de' Medici, in the period of 1515–1519. Her rule was feared as a sign of the end of republican government there. She was born from a noble family and raised in the royal court of Naples. She was the wife of Piero di Lorenzo de' Medici from 1488, the mother of Lorenzo II de' Medici and two daughters. She helped restore the Medicis to power after they had been exiled, worked to secure a French royal marriage for her son, and was also influential at the court of Pope Leo X, her brother-in-law.

Throughout her life, she used her wealth, position, and connections to help the poor and underrepresented. She also used them to further her family's power and wealth. She was a patron of the arts and architecture, both in Florence and in Rome. This included renovation of religious buildings as well as construction of palaces for the family.

== Early life and family ==
Born in 1472, she was the daughter of Roberto Orsini, Count of Tagliacozzo and Alba and his wife, Caterina Sanseverino. She was raised in the court of Ferdinand I of Naples. In 1486, Orsini's marriage to Piero di Lorenzo de' Medici was arranged by his uncle, Bernardo Rucellai who stood in as proxy. In February 1488, she brought a dowry of 12000 ducats when she joined her husband at a wedding in Rome attended by Ferdinand and his wife Joanna of Aragon. She finally arrived in Florence in May 1488.

Like previous wives of the Medicis, she was frequently petitioned by the religious and the poor to aid their requests for aid from her husband, and later, her son. She was asked to help ease tax burdens, provide jobs, and release impounded property. Orsini, her mother, and Clarice Orsini supported a major renovation of the Santa Lucia convent in Florence. Alfonsina’s father Roberto Orsini and Clarice’s mother Maddalena Orsini were siblings, making them first cousins, while Clarice was also Alfonsina’s mother-in-law. The renovation included expanding dormitories for the Dominican sisters, rebuilding the church, and adding other rooms and chapels. A few of the rooms were made available for women in the Medici family whenever they were needed.

=== Issue ===
Alfonsina Orsini and her husband had three children:

- Clarice de' Medici (1489–1528) married Filippo Strozzi
- Lorenzo de' Medici, Duke of Urbino (1492–1519)
- Luisa de' Medici (b. February 1494)

== Political life ==
Her husband and other men in the Medici family were exiled in November 1494 when Piero's negotiations with the invading Charles VIII of France did not meet with the people's expectations. On 9 November 1494, a mob plundered the Medici palace and drove Alfonsina and her mother out, stripping them of their jewelry. They then stayed at the convent they had rebuilt. Under Florentine law, women and children were not included with their husbands or fathers in exile, though their funds and ability to travel were limited. The law also allowed women whose husbands were exiled to use their dowry as their primary source of funds, but Alfonsina's dowry was included in the state seizure of Medici assets. Alfonsina and her mother negotiated with Charles to end the exile, but he only removed their status as rebels, and could not lift the exile. In May 1495, Alfonsina asked permission to travel to Rome and rejoin her husband there, but she was denied. That September, she left without permission and joined Piero and his brother Giuliano in Siena. Her mother was exiled from Florence in March 1497.

Piero died in exile in 1503. Alfonsina returned briefly to Florence in 1507 to attempt to claim her dowry and to seek a husband for her daughter, Clarice. She was well received by many people there and worked to build support for a Medici return. Thanks to negotiations by Lucrezia de' Medici, Clarice was engaged to Filippo Strozzi in Rome in December 1508, bringing the Strozzi into the Medici camp. Alfonsina provided Clarice a dowry of 4000 ducats. In 1507, the leader of Florence, Piero Soderini, asked his brother, Cardinal Francesco Soderini to help resolve Alfonsina's claim on her dowry, but progress was slow. In 1508, she asked Pope Julius II to claim the Cardinal's funds until he could get her the money, but that did not help. She did not receive her dowry funds until late in 1510. The Medici exile lasted until September 1512, though Alfonsina remained in Rome.

When her brother-in-law was elected as Pope Leo X, she took advantage of the situation to increase her income and provide additional funds to her son. By 1514, she noted that the Pope was running low on funds, but continued to act in her family's interest. She spent a year lobbying for her son-in-law to get the position of Depositor-General of the Vatican, giving her family direct access to Vatican treasuries. The Medicis began to have public disputes about which of the family members and clients should get the most powerful and influential positions. Alfonsina was working so that her son would have sole authority in Florence, while others, led by Lucrezia, wanted a more distributed government. Alfonsina even encouraged Lorenzo to interfere in elections in Florence, to get the right people elected. She regularly reminded him to reward families that had been loyal to the Medicis and Orsinis for a long time. About this time, she also began negotiating for a royal bride for Lorenzo, considering marriage with a Spanish princess. Eventually, her aspirations were met with his marriage to Madeleine de La Tour d'Auvergne.

=== Regency ===
Portrait of Alfonsina by Francesco Allegrini 1761

In June 1515, she moved back to the Medici palace in Florence. Though the Republic of Florence was still a republic in name, Lorenzo ruled with his mother's help. The Medici palace became the location where government decisions were made. When Lorenzo took the Florentine army in the summer of 1515 to support Pope Leo and the Spanish in the war against Francis I of France, Alfonsina took up the rule in his name. Though she could not hold an official office, she directed the decisions of the governing councils and edited the letters Lorenzo sent to the councils. The councils noted in their records that decisions had been made "by order of Magnificent Lady Alfonsina." She had her chancellor, Bernardo Fiamminghi, appointed as the secretary of the office which created new laws. She also provided orders on who should be 'elected' to the councils throughout the rest of her son's life. She was also involved in the strategy regarding the war. When the Swiss mercenaries left the Spanish army, she began sending treaty proposals to Francis. Pope Leo asked her to provide the ambassadors to negotiate the treaty with Francis. The treaty included a provision allowing the Medici to continue their rule. She had the responsibility of planning the official visit of Pope Leo to Florence in November 1515 as he was traveling to sign the peace treaty.

She was a driving force behind her son receiving the Duchy of Urbino in 1516, and helped to fund his side of the War of Urbino. While he was away again starting that fall, she ruled remotely from Rome, providing direction to Goro Gheri who worked in Florence for her through 1517. Even when Lorenzo provided direction to Gheri, he confirmed the decision with Alfonsina before acting on the orders. She took responsibility for appointing governors to lands ruled by Florence, including Reggio and Urbino, who followed her orders.

Her rule was not popular, and even during Pope Leo's visit in 1515, posters went up protesting her greed and naming her an enemy of liberty. Many citizens of Florence feared the impending end of the republic, and a conversion to a monarchy. By the spring of 1519, her health was so poor she could no longer walk. She died in Rome on 7 February 1520. When she died, rumors of her greed were spread indicating that she left behind a fabulous fortune, more than 70000 ducats. While she did not leave behind as much as that, she left about 10000 ducats to Pope Leo, trusting him to use the funds to care for her daughter and granddaughter. She is buried in the Basilica of Santa Maria del Popolo.

== Influence on art and architecture ==
Until her husband's exile, she sponsored the work of Mariotto Albertinelli, sending his paintings to her extended family throughout Italy. In 1504, Alfonsina inherited a castle near Tivoli from her mother. In 1514, her son-in-law Filippo wrote a description of her collection of ancient statues, noting they were among the best in Rome. From 1515 to 1519, she was involved with her son Lorenzo in several major construction projects, continuing construction of a villa at Poggio a Caiano, work on a lake house at Fucecchio, and rebuilding gardens in Florence. During that period, she also independently managed the construction of the Medici-Lante Palace in Rome. She employed the architect Nanni di Baccio Bigio to work on each of these projects.

== In popular culture ==
Featured briefly in the beginning of "The Serpent Queen" by an uncredited actress in a non speaking role.

== Sources ==
- Gilbert, Felix (1949). "Bernardo Rucellai and the Orti Oricellari: A Study on the Origin of Modern Political Thought". Journal of the Warburg and Courtauld Institutes. 12. Warburg Institute: 101–131. doi:10.2307/750259. JSTOR 750259. S2CID 152959005.
- Reiss, Sheryl E. (2001). "Widow, Mother, Patron of Art: Alfonsina Orsini de' Medici". In Reiss, Sheryl E.; Wilkins, David G. (eds.). Beyond Isabella: Secular Women Patrons of Art in Renaissance Italy Volume 54 of Sixteenth century essays & studies. Truman State Univ Press. ISBN 9780943549880.
- Tomas, Natalie R. (2003). The Medici Women: Gender and Power in Renaissance Florence. Aldershot: Ashgate. ISBN 0754607771.
