= Filippo Strozzi the Younger =

Florentine banker (1489–1538)

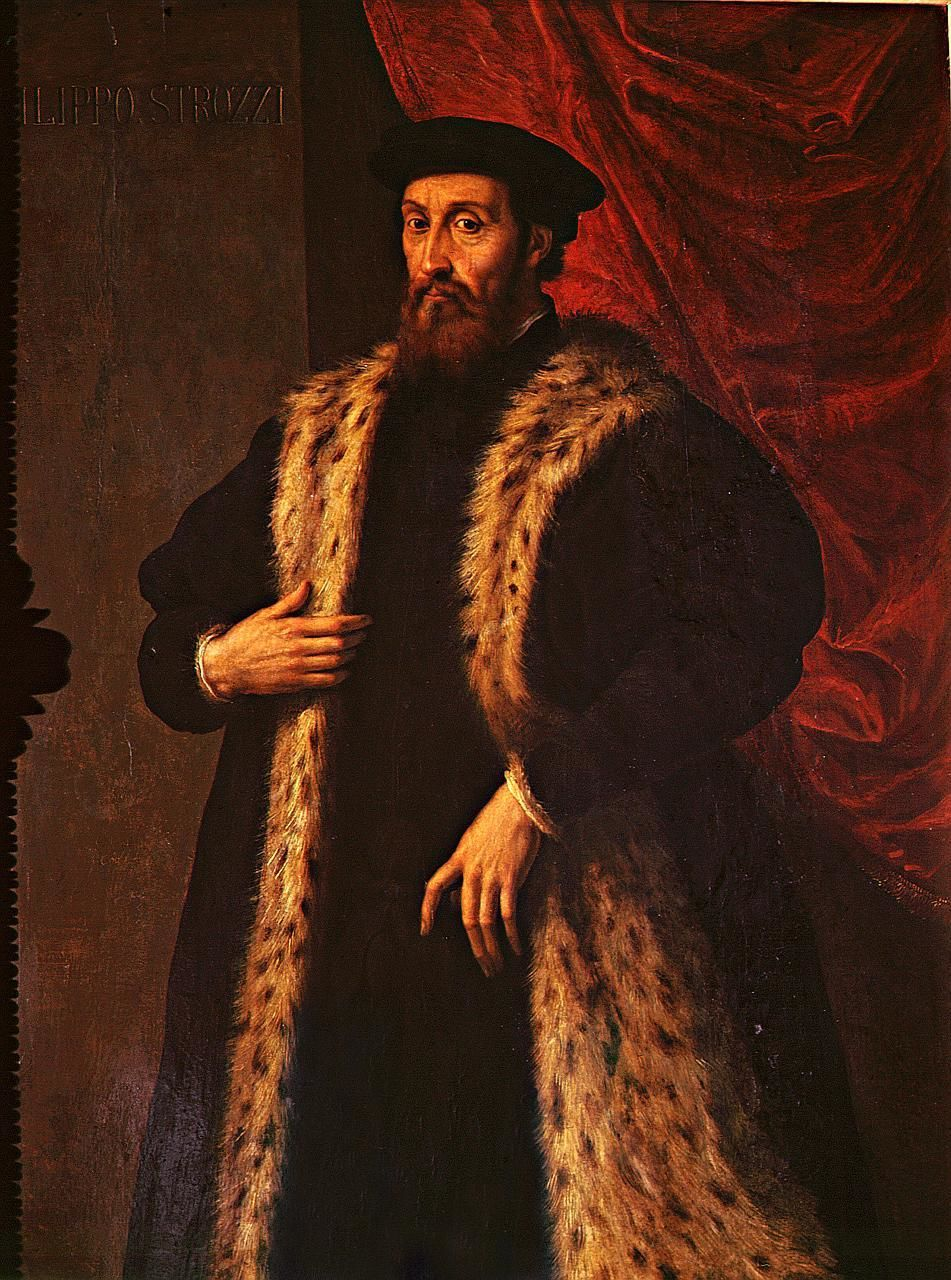
Filippo Strozzi the Younger (copy of the c. 1536 original portrait, dated c. 1550–60)

Filippo Strozzi the Younger (4 January 1489 – 18 December 1538) was a Florentine banker, and the most famous member of the Strozzi family in the Renaissance. He is best remembered as a tragic hero and defender of the lost Florentine republic against the Medici dukes – yet this is almost entirely a nineteenth-century fiction of nationalist historians and dramatists. He had been one of the staunchest supporters of the House of Medici in Florence and Rome.

== Biography ==
Born in Florence as Giambattista Strozzi, he was rechristened by his mother with the name of his father Filippo Strozzi the Elder, who had died two years after the child's birth.

From the late fifteenth century, Medici power rendered the Florentine nobility, including the various branches of the Strozzi family, more courtiers than citizens. Filippo the Younger was merely rich until 1515, when he entered the service of Pope Leo X as depositor general of the Apostolic Chamber. From here he built a financial empire stretching from Naples to the Atlantic.

When Leo X (Giovanni di Lorenzo de' Medici) ascended to the papacy in 1513, Florence effectively ceased to be an independent state. A few bankers benefited enormously, none more so than Filippo the Younger, who married Leo's niece, and who was instrumental in a massive transfer of wealth from Florence to Rome. These money transfers between the depositories of Florence and Rome were an internal affair of the Strozzi bank. Filippo and his associates camouflaged carefully these transfers and doctored records before presenting their accounts to the Florentine government.

A second Medici pope, Clement VII, reigned from 1523 to 1534. Filippo remained depositor general under Clement until the sack of Rome in 1527. He described his livelihood as “contingent on Clement's living breath,” and through Clement he came to control papal tax revenues in Spain. In Rome during a grain shortage in 1533, Filippo conspired to sell inferior grain at inflated prices. When Clement died the next year, mobs promptly ransacked Filippo's grain depots in Trastevere. Only now, after he had lost his Medici protector, did Filippo join the Florentine exiles, and his last four years as exile and prisoner have overshadowed all else.

In Filippo's house in Rome were educated Catherine de' Medici, the future queen of France, and Lorenzino de' Medici.

In the same year, the Strozzi assembled an army, including numerous other Florentine exiles, and marched against Florence from France. The Strozzi army was first halted at Sestino by troops hastily mustered by the new Medici lord, the future Cosimo I de' Medici, Grand Duke of Tuscany. The decisive Battle of Montemurlo occurred on 1 August 1537. Cosimo's army, supported by troops from Habsburg Spain, was victorious. Filippo Strozzi was imprisoned, while his sons escaped to Venice and then to France.

Details as to the end of Strozzi's life are unclear. He died in Florence's Fortress of San Giovanni Battista, either committing suicide or being killed by order of Cosimo de' Medici.

Filippo Strozzi's famous Palazzo Strozzi in Florence was begun by his father, and was completed in 1534.

== Issue ==
In 1508, he married Clarice de' Medici (1489-1528). They had ten children together:

- Piero Strozzi (1 March 1511 - 21 June 1558), condottiero and Marshal of France
- Maria Strozzi (13 August 1514, died between 1551 and 1575), married Lorenzo Ridolfi in 1529.
- Leone Strozzi (15 October 1515 - 28 June 1554), condottiero and Knight of Malta
- Luisa Strozzi (died 5 December 1534), married Senator Luigi Capponi in 1533, but was poisoned a year later.
- Roberto Strozzi (12 October 1520 - 1566), married Maddalena di Pierfrancesco de' Medici (Florence, c. 1523 - Rome, 14 April 1583), daughter of Pierfrancesco II de' Medici
- Maddalena Strozzi (1521-1596), married Count Flaminio dell'Anguillara in 1538.
- Giulio Strozzi (1522 - 1537)
- Lorenzo Strozzi (3 December 1523 - 14 December 1571), abbot and Cardinal
- Vincenzo Strozzi (died Rome, c. 1537), went mad.
- Alessandro Strozzi (died 31 October 1541)

== Ancestry ==
Ancestors of Filippo Strozzi the Younger

16. Filippo Strozzi
8. Simone Strozzi
17. Margherita Ferratini
4. Matteo Strozzi
18. Neri Rondinelli
9. Andreina Rondinelli
2. Filippo Strozzi the Elder
10. Filippo Macinghi
5. Alessandra Macighi
11. Caterina di Bernardo Alberti
1. Filippo Strozzi the Younger
6. Bartolommeo Gianfigliazzi
3. Salvaggia Gianfigliazzi
