= Battle of Montemurlo =

- Part of Italian War of 1536–1538
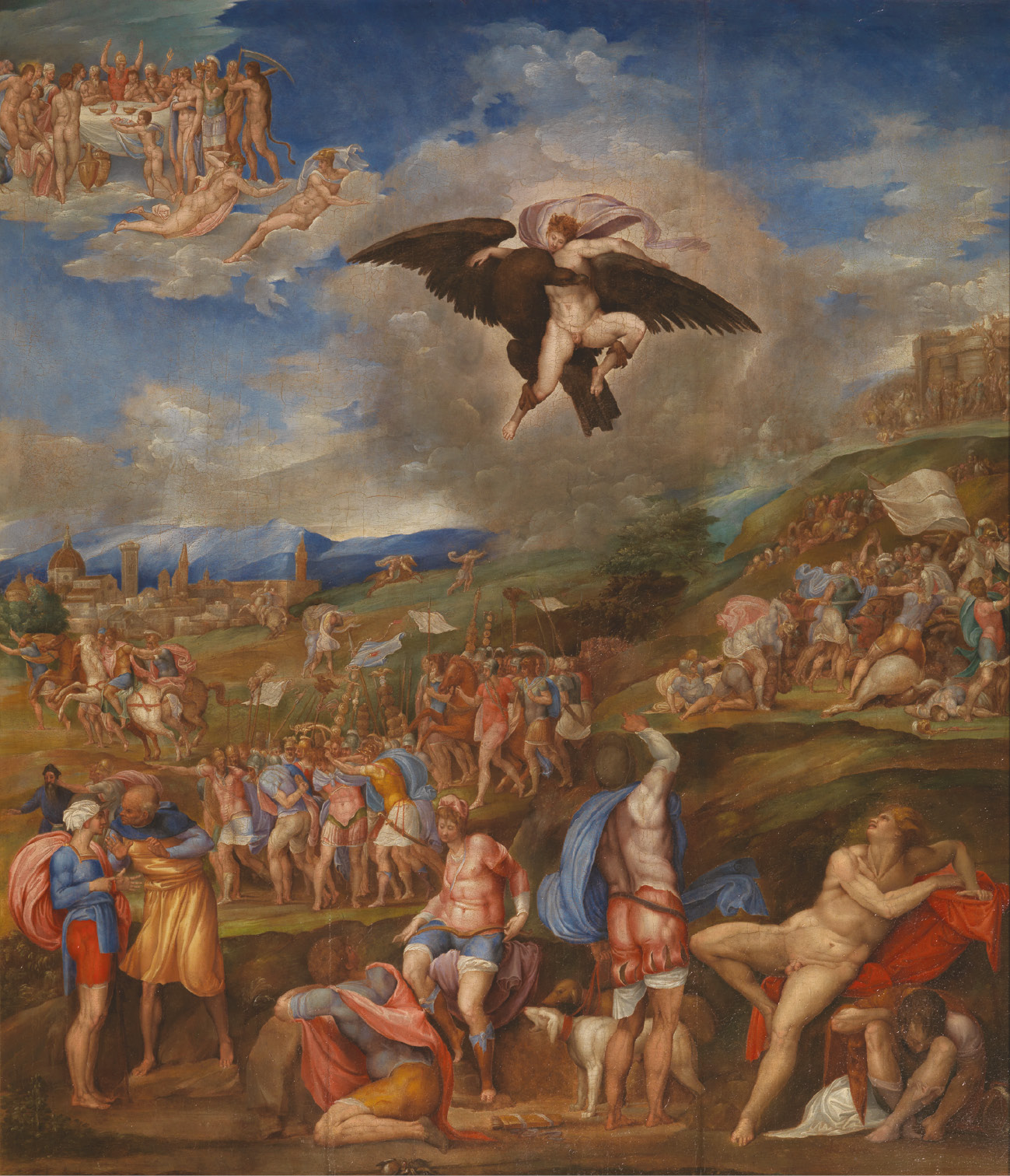
- The Battle of Montemurlo and the Rape of Ganymede, by Battista Franco Veneziano
Date	2 August 1537
Location	Montemurlo, Prato, Tuscany, Italy
Result	Victory for the Medici family and its supporters

Belligerents
Duchy of Florence (Duke Cosimo I)	Supporters of the Republic of Florence

Commanders and leaders
Alessandro Vitelli	Piero Strozzi; Bernardo Salviati

Strength
700 infantry 100 Cavalry	Unknown

On 1 or 2 August 1537 (both dates are given in sources), near the Tuscan village of Montemurlo, the forces of the newly installed Duke Cosimo I of Florence defeated a hastily organized army of those who wished to overthrow the Medici and restore the Republic of Florence. Following the battle, Cosimo's bloody vengeance on all those who opposed Medici rule effectively ended organized opposition to his family in Florence. The victory led to the decision of Emperor Charles V to formally recognize Cosimo as Duke of Florence on 30 September 1537.
