= Lorenzo de' Medici, Duke of Urbino =

Italian nobleman (1492–1519)

Lorenzo II de' Medici
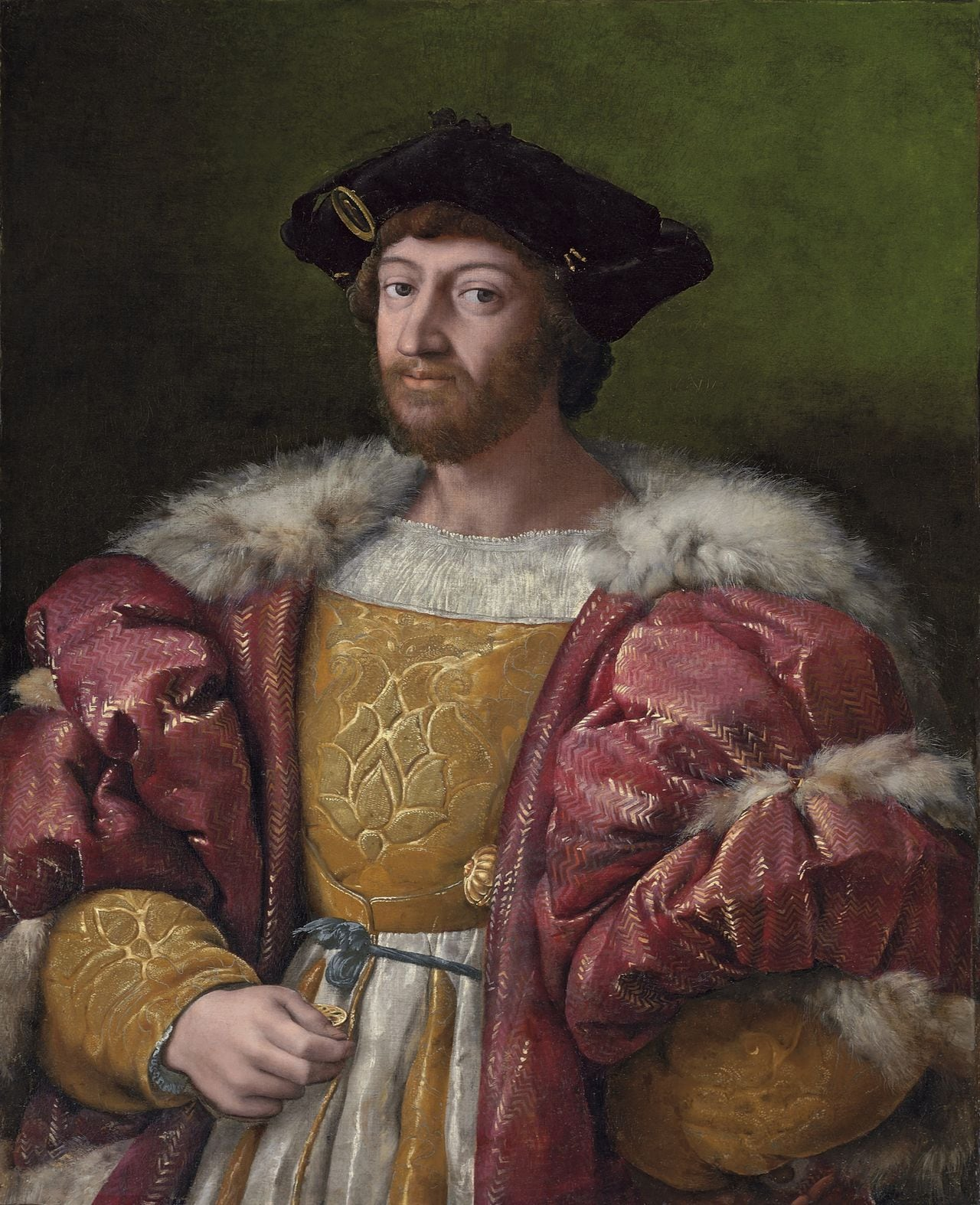
- Portrait by Raphael, 1518

Ruler of Florence
- Reign: 17 March 1516 – 4 May 1519
- Predecessor: Giuliano de' Medici
- Successor: Giulio de' Medici
- Born: 12 September 1492; Florence, Republic of Florence
- Died: 4 May 1519 (aged 26); Careggi, Republic of Florence
- Noble family: Medici
- Spouse: Madeleine de La Tour d'Auvergne (m. 1518; died 1519)
- Issue: Catherine, Queen of France; Alessandro de' Medici, Duke of Florence (illegitimate)
- Father: Piero the Unfortunate
- Mother: Alfonsina Orsini

Lorenzo di Piero de' Medici (Italian: [loˈrɛntso di ˈpjɛːro de ˈmɛːditʃi]; 12 September 1492 – 4 May 1519) was the ruler of Florence from 1516 until his death in 1519. He was also Duke of Urbino during the same period. A scion of the Medici, his wealth and power saw his daughter Catherine de' Medici become Queen Consort of France, while his recognised but illegitimate son, Alessandro de' Medici, inherited his estate and became the first Duke of Florence.

== Early life ==
Lorenzo was born in Florence on 12 September 1492, a son of Piero di Lorenzo de' Medici and Alfonsina Orsini. His paternal grandparents were Lorenzo the Magnificent and Clarice Orsini. His maternal grandparents were Roberto Orsini, Count of Tagliacozzo and his wife, Catherine of San Severino.

== Career ==
Lorenzo II became lord of Florence in 1516, after his uncle, Giuliano de' Medici died. Ambitious by nature, Lorenzo II, despite being appointed Captain of the Florentine militia, lacked patience with Florence's republican system of government and thus, in 1516, convinced his uncle, Pope Leo X to make him Duke of Urbino at the age of 24. So began a conflict with the city's previous duke, Francesco Maria I della Rovere. During the protracted War of Urbino, Delle Rovere recaptured the city, only to have Medici — commanding a 10,000-man Papal army — in turn, retake the city. During battle, Lorenzo was wounded, which prompted him to retire to Tuscany. In September 1517, he regained Urbino via treaty; however, it remained under the Medici family's rule for only two years. In 1521 the duchy reverted to the Della Rovere family.

On 13 June 1518, Lorenzo married Madeleine de La Tour, daughter of the Count of Auvergne. The marriage produced a daughter, Catherine, in 1519. Catherine de' Medici went on to become Queen of France, via a marriage to the future King Henry II of France, arranged by the second Medici Pope, Pope Clement VII. Madeleine died 28 April 1519, followed by Lorenzo, who died 4 May 1519. Thus his daughter Catherine was raised primarily by the Medici Popes, Leo X and Clement VII, and their surrogates.

Lorenzo II's tomb is in the Medici Chapel of Florence's Church of San Lorenzo. There is disagreement over which of the two tombs is Lorenzo II's. The received view is that Lorenzo's tomb that is adorned by Michelangelo's sculpture Pensieroso, which offers an idealized portrait of Lorenzo II, and that its companion piece, also sculpted by Michelangelo, represents Lorenzo II's uncle Giuliano di Lorenzo de' Medici. But historian Richard Trexler has argued that Lorenzo II, having been Captain of the Florentine militia, must be the figure holding the baton, symbol of military authority conferred by the Republic. Trexler also notes that the "Pensieroso" is holding a mappa, the symbol of military authority in ancient Rome, which would be an appropriate symbol for Giuliano di Lorenzo, who was appointed Captain of Roman forces. In sharing the same name with his illustrious ancestor, Lorenzo the Magnificent, the Duke's tomb is often mistaken for that of his grandfather.

Famously, Niccolò Machiavelli dedicated his political treatise The Prince to Lorenzo to advise him of tactics to use to maintain his authority.

== Issue ==
Lorenzo and Madeleine had:

- Catherine de' Medici (1519 – 1589), married the French prince Henry and later became Queen of France.

By Simonetta, a servant girl of his mother Alfonsina, he had an illegitimate son:

- Alessandro de' Medici, Duke of Florence (1510 – 1537) - he was assassinated by his cousin Lorenzaccio and his death caused the title of Duke to pass to Cosimo I de Medici, from the family's junior branch.

== Ancestry ==
Ancestors of Lorenzo de' Medici, Duke of Urbino

8. Piero de' Medici
4. Lorenzo de' Medici
9. Lucrezia Tornabuoni
2. Piero de' Medici
10. Jacopo Orsini, Lord of Monterotondo
5. Clarissa Orsini
11. Maddalena Orsini
1. Lorenzo de' Medici, Duke of Urbino
12. Carlo Orsini, Lord of Bracciano
6. Roberto Orsini, Count of Tagliacozzo
13. Paola Orsini
3. Alfonsina Orsini
14. Amerigo Sanseverino, Count of Capaccio
7. Caterina Sanseverino
15. Margherita Sanseverino

== See also ==
- House of Medici
- Medici Chapel

== Sources ==
- Cavallo, Sandra; Evangelisti, Silvia, eds. (2016). Domestic Institutional Interiors in Early Modern Europe. Routledge.
- Fletcher, Catherine (2016). The Black Prince of Florence: The Spectacular Life and Treacherous World of Alessandro de' Medici. Oxford University Press.
- Hoogvliet, Margriet (2003). "Princely Culture and Catherine de Medicis". In Gosman, Martin; MacDonald, Alasdair A.; Vanderjagt, Arjo J. (eds.). Princes and Princely Culture 1450-1650. Vol. 1. Brill. pp. 103–130. ISBN 978-90-04-25352-0.
- Knecht, R.J. (2014). Catherine de'Medici. Routledge. ISBN 9781317896876.
- Stapleford, Richard, ed. (2013). Lorenzo De' Medici at Home: The Inventory of the Palazzo Medici in 1492. The Pennsylvania State University Press.

Lorenzo II de' Medici House of Medici Born: 12 September 1492 Died: 4 May 1519
Italian nobility
Preceded by Francesco Maria I della Rovere	Duke of Urbino; 1516–1519	Succeeded by Francesco Maria I della Rovere
