= Piero the Unfortunate =

Lord of Florence from 1492 to 1494

Piero de' Medici
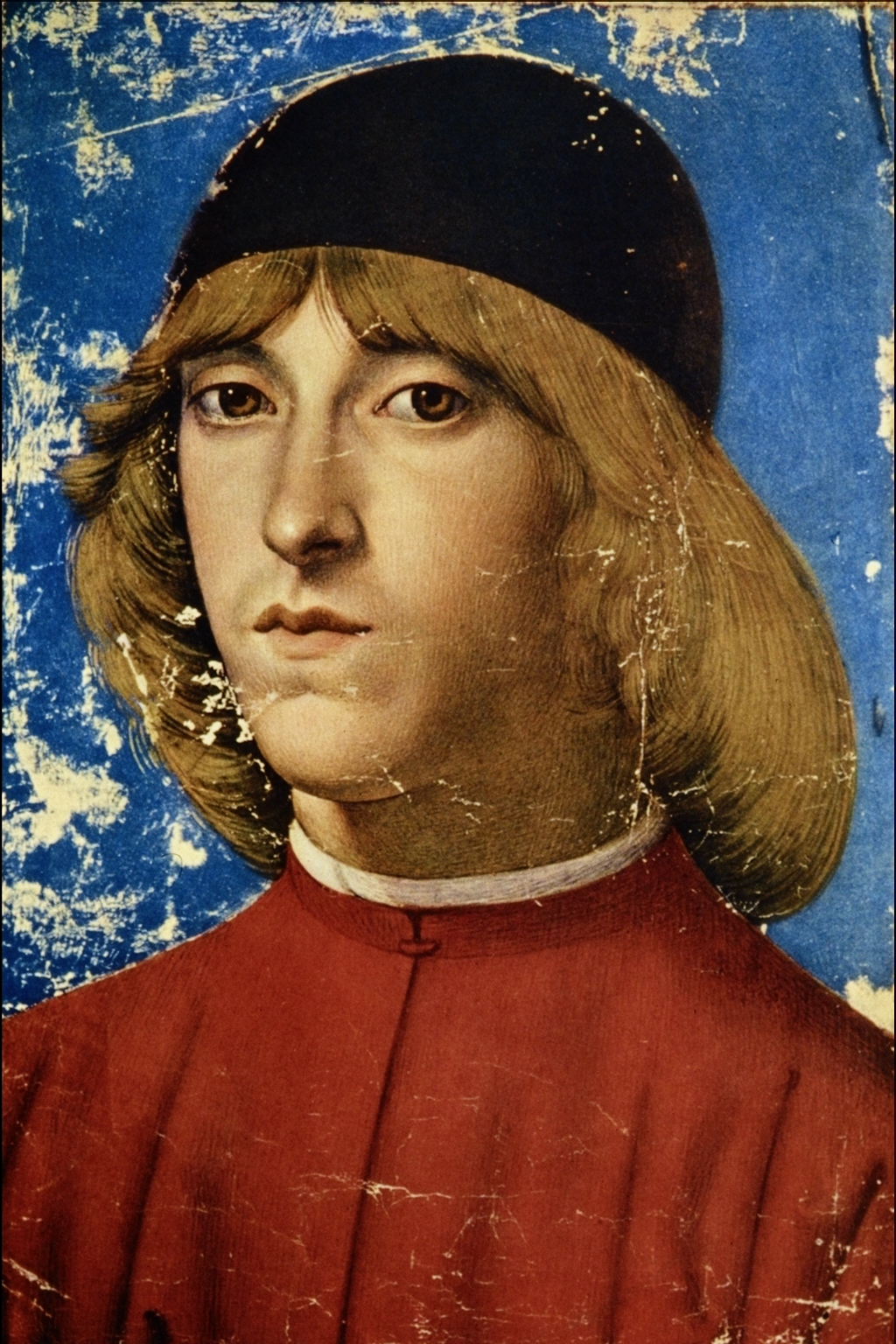
- Portrait of Piero de' Medici by Gherardo di Giovanni del Fora.

Lord of Florence
- Reign: 9 April 1492 – 9 November 1494
- Predecessor: Lorenzo de' Medici
- Successor: Girolamo Savonarola
- Born: 15 February 1472; Florence, Republic of Florence
- Died: 28 December 1503 (aged 31); Garigliano River, Kingdom of Naples
- Noble family: Medici
- Spouse: Alfonsina Orsini (m. 1488)
- Issue: Clarice de' Medici; Maria de' Medici ill. Lorenzo II, Duke of Urbino; Luisa de' Medici
- Father: Lorenzo de' Medici
- Mother: Clarice Orsini

Piero di Lorenzo de' Medici (15 February 1472 – 28 December 1503), called Piero the Fatuous or Piero the Unfortunate, was the Lord of Florence from 1492 until his exile in 1494.

== Early life ==
Piero di Lorenzo de' Medici was the eldest son of Lorenzo de' Medici (Lorenzo the Magnificent) and Clarice Orsini. He was raised alongside his younger brother Giovanni, who would go on to become Pope Leo X, and his cousin Giulio, who would later become Pope Clement VII.

Piero was educated to succeed his father as head of the Medici family and de facto ruler of the Florentine state, under figures such as Angelo Poliziano or Marsilio Ficino. However, his feeble, arrogant, and undisciplined character was to prove unsuited to such a role. Poliziano later died of poisoning, very possibly by Piero, on 24 September 1494. Piero was also constantly at odds with his cousins, Lorenzo and Giovanni, the two sons of Pierfrancesco de' Medici, who were both older and richer than Piero.

== Marriage and children ==
In 1486, Piero's uncle Bernardo Rucellai negotiated for him to marry the Tuscan noblewoman Alfonsina Orsini and stood in for him in a marriage by proxy. Piero and Alfonsina met in 1488. She was a daughter of Roberto Orsini, Count of Tagliacozzo, and Caterina Sanseverino. They had at least three children:

- Clarice de' Medici (September 1489–1528), who later married Filippo Strozzi the Younger;
- Lorenzo de' Medici (September 1492–1519), later Duke of Urbino;
- Luisa de' Medici (born February 1494).

From baptismal records it appears that in February 1492 he also had another daughter, Maria, who was illegitimate.

== Rule of Florence ==
Italy in 1494

Piero took over as leader of Florence in 1492, upon Lorenzo's death. After a brief period of relative calm, the fragile peaceful equilibrium between the Italian states, laboriously constructed by Piero's father, collapsed in 1494 with the decision of King Charles VIII of France to cross the Alps with an army in order to assert hereditary claims to the Kingdom of Naples. Charles had been lured to Italy by Ludovico Sforza (Ludovico il Moro), ex-regent of Milan, as a way to eject Ludovico's nephew Gian Galeazzo Sforza and replace him as duke.

After settling matters in Milan, Charles moved towards Naples. He needed to pass through Tuscany, as well as leave troops there to secure his lines of communication with Milan. As Charles's army approached Tuscany, he sent envoys to Florence to ask Piero to support his claim to Naples and allow his army to pass through Tuscany. Piero waited five days before responding that Florence would remain neutral. This was unacceptable to Charles, who intended to invade Tuscany, starting with the fortress of Fivizzano, which he sacked and brutally massacred.

Piero attempted to mount a resistance, but received little support from members of the Florentine elite who had fallen under the influence of the fanatical Dominican priest Girolamo Savonarola. Even his cousins, Lorenzo and Giovanni, allied themselves with Charles, sending him messages to pledge their support and funds.

By the end of October, Piero had not succeeded in gaining any support for Florence, and, without consulting the governing Signoria, decided to visit Charles at his camp and try to win his friendship. During their meeting, Piero acceded to all of Charles's demands, including surrendering the fortresses of Sarzana, Pietrasanta, Sarzanello, and Librafratta, as well as the towns of Pisa and Livorno.

When Piero returned to Florence to report back to the Signoria, he was greeted with public outrage, and he and his family fled the city for Venice. The family palazzo was looted, and the substance as well as the form of the Republic of Florence was re-established with the Medici formally exiled. A member of the Medici family was not to rule Florence again until 1512, when the city was forced to surrender by Giovanni de' Medici, who in 1513 was elected Pope Leo X, solidifying the family's power.

== Exile ==
Piero and his family fled at first to Venice with the aid of the French diplomat Philippe de Commines, a retainer of Charles VIII. They supported themselves by selling Medici jewels that had been collected by Lorenzo de' Medici. Piero also tried to reinstate himself in Florence multiple times, once appearing at the Porta Romana in Florence with a band of men, who left for Siena after it appeared that Florentines would not welcome the Medici back as leaders.

In 1503, as the French and Spanish continued their struggle in Italy over the Kingdom of Naples, Piero was drowned in the Garigliano River while attempting to flee the aftermath of the Battle of Garigliano, which the French (with whom he was allied) had lost. He was buried in the Abbey of Monte Cassino; his tomb was designed by Antonio and Battista da Sangallo.
