= Alessandra Macinghi Strozzi =

Florentine noblewoman

- Born: Alessandra di Filippo Macinghi c. 1408; Florence, Italy
- Died: March 1471; Florence, Italy
- Burial place: Capella Strozzi di Mantova in Basilica di Santa Maria Novella
- Spouse: Matteo di Simone Strozzi
- Children: Andreuola (1424-c. 1425); Andreuola Caterina (c. 1425-1435); Simone (1427-1435); Filippo Strozzi the Elder (1428-1491); Piero (1429-1435); Caterina (1431-1481); Lorenzo (1432-1479); Alessandra (1434-1494); Matteo (1436-1459)
- Parent(s): Filippo di Niccolò Macinghi and Caterina di Bernardo Alberti

Alessandra Macinghi Strozzi (c. 1408 – March c. 1471) was a Florentine Renaissance business and noblewoman known for her preserved correspondence which chronicled her financial and political struggles in Medici Florence. Strozzi was largely family oriented and worked hard to place her sons in successful banking positions and all her children beneficial marriages. Seventy-three of her letters were preserved by her son Filippo and are now housed by the Archivio de Stato di Firenze. Strozzi's letters rank among the most significant primary sources from fifteenth-century Florence.

== Life ==
=== Early life ===
Alessandra di Filippo Macinghi was born between 1406 and 1408 to Filippo di Niccolò Macinghi and Caterina di Bernardo Alberti. The date of her birth is contested as the final entry in her book of accounts in 1471 gives her age as 63 but a tax document from 1427 claims her age to be 22 years and 2 months. Not much is known about Strozzi's childhood. The Macinghi family was a new elite family and thus lacked the social standing held by more established families such as the Strozzi. Alessandra's mother died while she was still a young child and her father remarried to Ginevra di Albertuccio Ricasoli. Strozzi had 5 siblings. Her elder brother Berto was illegitimate and her only full sibling was her younger brother Zanobi. Filippo's marriage to Ginerva gave Strozzi an additional 3 siblings, Caterina, Antonio, and Ginevra. Strozzi's father died in 1420 when she was around the age of 12. Analogous to women of similar social standing, Strozzi received an education that covered the basics of reading, writing, and keeping accounts.

=== Marriage ===
Alessandra Macinghi married Matteo di Simone Strozzi on June 10, 1422, bringing a dowry of 1,600 florins. Due to her father's death, Strozzi's marriage was negotiated by her stepmother and uncles. Strozzi and Matteo had 9 children together, 8 of which survived infancy and 5 of whom survived to adulthood. Due to Matteo's involvement against the Medici in Florentine politics, in 1434 he was exiled to Pesaro for 5 years along with other male members of his extended family for considering violence against the Medici. Though she had the opportunity to remain in the family household in Florence and run it, Strozzi only stayed long enough to put family affairs in order and followed Matteo into exile bringing along their children. The entirety of the Strozzi family was blocked from prominent political offices while the Macinghi began to rise in political prominence as they supported the Medici beginning a rift between Strozzi and her birth family. In 1435, the plague hit Pesaro and Matteo along with Andreuola Caterina, Simone, and Piero all perished.

=== Widowhood ===
Following Matteo's death, Strozzi returned her family to Florence. It was after this return that she had her final child who she named Matteo after his father. She chose not to remarry citing religious reasons which as in line with a majority of women. Additionally, she sought to remain a part of her children's lives which would have been impossible if she remarried. Due to patrilineal norms, children remained to be raised by their father's extended family upon the remarriage of their mother; the mother was not involved in the lives of her children partially due to an inherent distrust of the mother's new husband. In Matteo the Elder named Strozzi guardian of her children in his will so long as she did not remarry. Matteo the Elder's will also allowed Strozzi to choose her male representative when handling family affairs. Much of Matteo the Elder's properties had been sold to pay off family debts, however, Strozzi owned property that held a value equivalent to that of her dowry. The first many years of Strozzi's widowhood were spent with tight finances as she paid off debts and was taxed at a higher rate as a result of Matteo the Elder's poor relationship with the Medici.

Strozzi maintained close connections with her in-laws who helped ensure a stable upbringing for her children and their future success. Strozzi arranged with relatives for her sons to be given banking positions in Naples so that they could contribute to family finances and live in a less precarious situation. To this end, Strozzi made careful selections in matters such as where her family lived, who they rented property to, and what alliances and connections they made. Strozzi's life largely revolved around her children. For her daughters, she negotiated marriages she believed would be good. She did the same for her sons Filippo and Lorenzo after the exile order which had carried over from father to sons was lifted in 1466 by Piero di Cosimo de' Medici and their social standing increased. Matteo the Younger died prior to this at the age 23 in 1458.

Several times during her sons' exile, Strozzi considered joining them in Naples. In Florence, Strozzi maintained a small household consisting of her ward Isabella Strozzi, an illegitimate daughter of one of Matteo's relatives, whom she raised from age 8 until Isabella was married at age 16. Additionally, Strozzi's brother Zanobi came to stay with her as he had financial difficulties and both were on bad terms with a majority of their Macinghi relatives.

== Financial involvements ==
As head of household, Strozzi controlled the family finances and worked through many challenges to keep the household stable. To this end, she was in charge of her children's education and steered her sons towards banking as a method of improving the family finances. All that Strozzi's children were set to inherit came from the property not sold to pay of Matteo the Elder's debts as it constituted a value equivalent to the 1,600 florins of Strozzi's dowry. Property Strozzi was able to keep included the main family house in Florence as well as another, smaller house within the city and other properties and farms in the country. In the early years of Strozzi's widowhood, she had her family mainly reside in the smaller house in Florence as it cost less to maintain while she rented the family house out to one of Matteo the Elder's cousins for significantly more than she was spending maintaining the smaller home. Additionally, she rented out the farmlands to peasants who would in turn give her a share of the profits as if the land sat idle, she made nothing. When Strozzi's own finances stabilized with the success of her sons in Naples, she continued to look after much of her family's finances. Strozzi assisted her brother Zanobi when he ran into financial troubles by buying some of his properties contradicting the will of their father and driving a deeper rift between Strozzi and most of the Macinghi family.

== Death and legacy ==
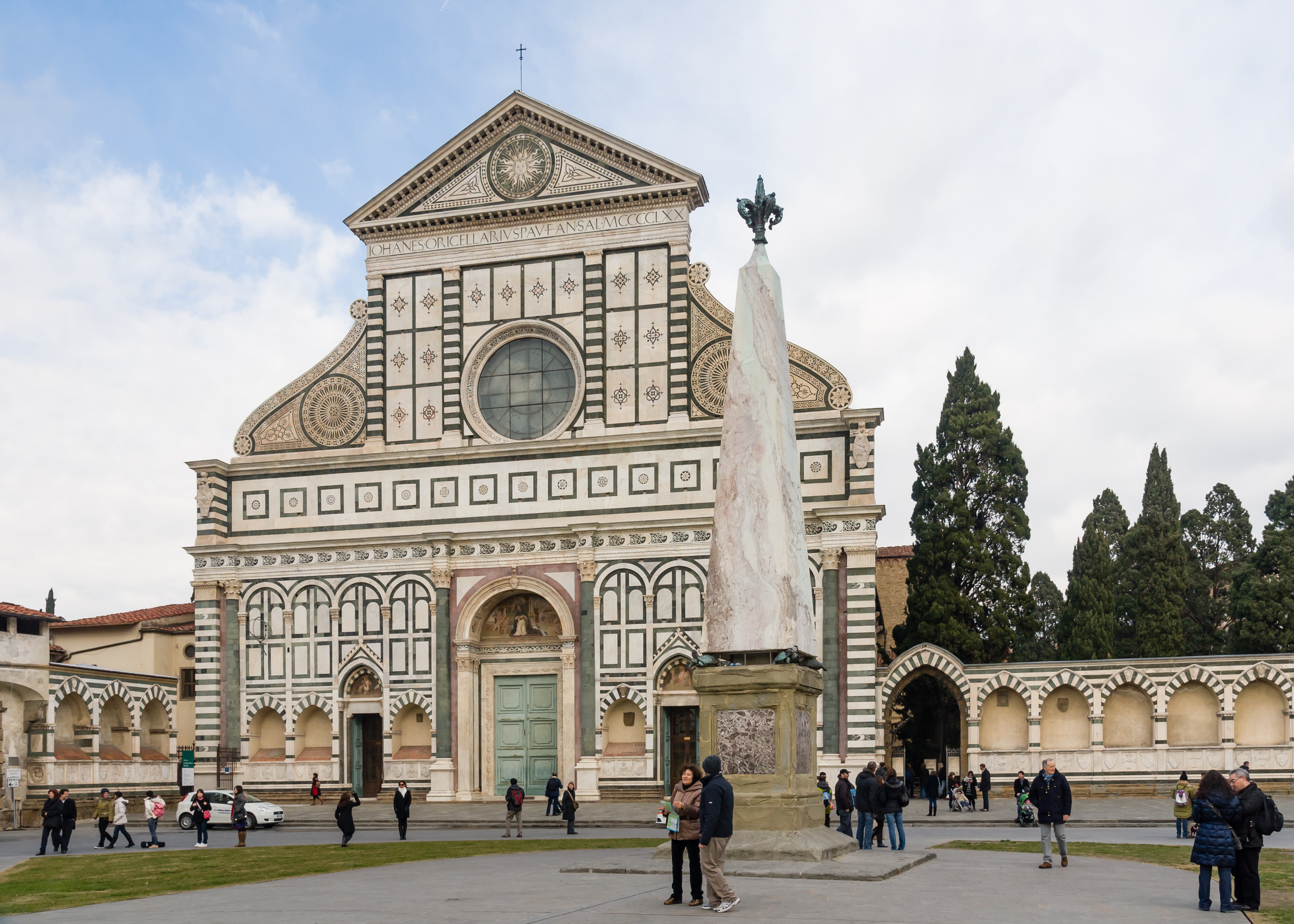
The Basilica di Santa Maria Novella wherein Alessandra Strozzi is buried

Strozzi's final preserved letter was written in 1470. She died of old age in March 1471 and her death was recorded by her son Filippo in her book of accounts as occurring at the age of 63. She was entombed within the Strozzi Chapel at what was then the Church of Santa Maria Novella. No portraits of her exist.

=== Letters ===
Letters written by Strozzi dating from August 24, 1447, until April 14, 1470, detail aspects of Strozzi's life. Additionally, they provide an insight into the life of a widow in fifteenth century Florence and detail additional aspects of culture and family life that provide valuable information to historians. These letters were preserved by her eldest surviving son, Filippo Strozzi the Elder, most likely as they contained details about financial transactions and negotiations that pertained to the family. All of the letters were written in Strozzi's hand and all except one of the seventy-three are addressed to either Filippo, Lorenzo, or Matteo as Strozzi updates them on the events in Florence involving family members and general major occurrences.

== Sources ==
- Brucker, Gene (2005). Living on the Edge in Leonardo's Florence. Berkeley: University of California Press. p. 151-168. ISBN 9780520241343.
- Ann, Crabb (1992). "How Typical Was Alessandra Macinghi Strozzi of Fifteenth-Century Florentine Widows?". In Mirrer, Louise. Upon My Husband's Death: Widows in the Literature and Histories of Medieval Europe. Ann Arbor: University of Michigan Press. pp. 47–61. ISBN 9780472102570.
- Crabb, Ann (2000). The Strozzi of Florence: Widowhood and Family Solidarity in the Renaissance. University of Michigan Press. ISBN 0-472-10912-X.
- Gregory, Heather (1997). Selected Letters of Alessandra Strozzi: Bilingual Edition. Berkeley: University of California Press. ISBN 9780520203907.
- Klapisch-Zuber, Christiane (1985). Women, Family, and Ritual in Renaissance Italy. London: The University of Chicago Press. ISBN 0-226-43925-9.
