= Filippo Strozzi the Elder =

Italian banker and statesman

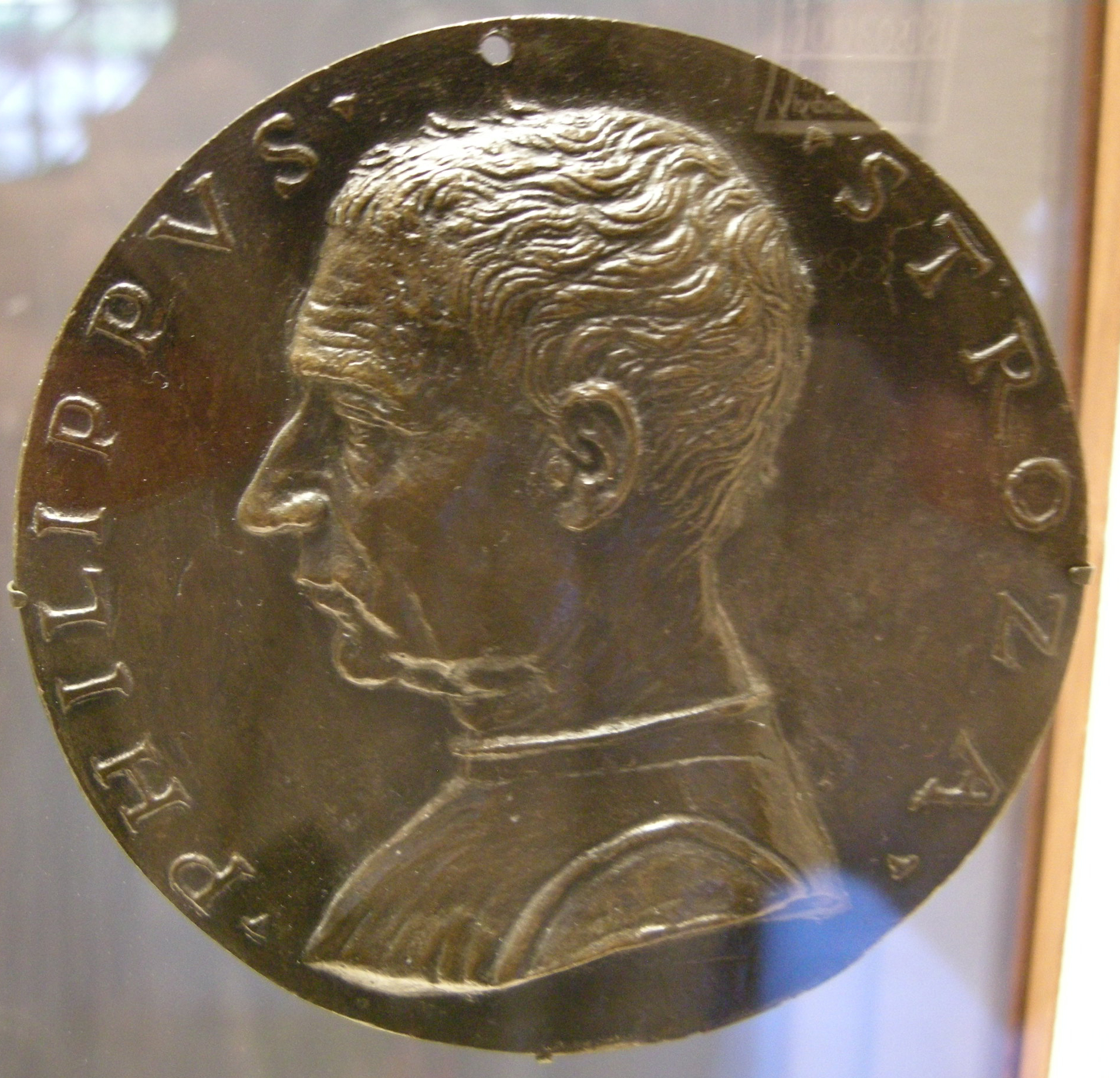
Filippo Strozzi the Elder, medal (1489)

Filippo Strozzi the Elder (4 July 1428 – 14 May 1491) was an Italian banker and statesman, a member of the affluent Strozzi family of Florence.

He was born in Florence to Matteo Strozzi (son of Simone Strozzi and Andreina Rondinelli) and Alessandra Macinghi (daughter of Filippo Macinghi). He was banned by the Medici as a young man, together with all his family, due to the opposition of Palla Strozzi against Cosimo de' Medici. He moved to Naples, and here he gained a renowned status as a banker.

When he returned to Florence he commissioned Benedetto da Maiano for the construction of the famous family palace; however, he died before the completion of the works, in 1534. He also had Maiano, along with Filippino Lippi, build a notable chapel in the Basilica di Santa Maria Novella. Completed in 1502, it houses Strozzi's remains.

== Family ==
He married two times, and produced 12 children.

=== Fiammetta Adimari ===
With Fiammetta Adimari (in 1466), daughter of Donato Adimari, who gave him five children:

- Alfonso (1467–1534)
- Lucrezia (1469–1481)
- Alessandro (1471–1473)
- Leonora (1472–1473)
- Maria

=== Salvaggia Gianfigliazzi ===
With Salvaggia Gianfigliazzi, daughter of Bartolommeo Gianfigliazzi (in 1477), who gave him:

- Lorenzo (1482–1549), who founded the line of the Princes of Forano
- Fiammetta (b. 1476)
- Gian Battista (died 1484)
- Alessandra
- Caterina
- Lucrezia (b. 1487)
- Gian Battista, best known as Filippo Strozzi the Younger (1489–1538), husband of Clarice de' Medici

== See also ==
- Strozzi family (category)
- People from the Republic of Florence
