= Sideboard (disambiguation) =

A sideboard is an item of furniture.

Sideboard may also refer to:

- Sideboard (Edward William Godwin), a sideboard designed by Edward William Godwin
- Sideboard (cards), a deck of cards in a collectible card game
- The Sideboard, a magazine about the Magic card game
- The Sideboard, a painting by Antonio López García
- "The Sideboard Song", a song by Chas & Dave
- Sideburns, a style of facial hair
