= D'Aragona =

d'Aragona is a surname. Notable people with surname include:

== A ==
- Andrea Matteo Acquaviva d'Aragona (died 1576), Roman Catholic prelate

== B ==
- Bartolomeo d'Aragona (14th century), Sicilian statesman
- Bernardino d'Aragona (1611–1664), Roman Catholic prelate

== C ==
- Carlo d'Aragona Tagliavia (1530–1599), Sicilian-Spanish nobleman and viceroy

== D ==
- Domenico Orsini d'Aragona (1719–1789) Italian, Roman Catholic Cardinal
- Donato Acquaviva d'Aragona (died 1528), Roman Catholic prelate

== E ==
- Eleonora d'Aragona (1450–1493), Duchess of Ferrara
- Enrico d'Aragona (died 1478), illegitimate son of the King of Naples

== F ==
- Federico II d'Aragona (1272–1337), regent of the Kingdom of Sicily
- Ferdinando d'Aragona y Guardato, 1st Duke of Montalto (died 1542), eldest bastard son of king Ferdinand I of Naples
- Francesco Acquaviva d'Aragona (1665–1725), Italian Cardinal

== G ==
- Giovanna d'Aragona, Duchess of Amalfi (1478–1510), Italian aristocrat, regent of the Duchy of Amalfi
- Giovanna Tagliavia d'Aragona, Duchess of Monteleone (1620–1674), Italian nobleman
- Giovanni d'Aragona (1456–1485), Italian Roman Catholic cardinal
- Giovanni Antonio Acquaviva d'Aragona (died 1525), Roman Catholic prelate
- Giovanni Vincenzo Acquaviva d'Aragona (died 1546), Cardinal of the Roman Catholic Church
- Guido Bentivoglio d'Aragona (1579–1644), Italian cardinal, statesman and historian

== H ==
- Horatius Acquaviva d'Aragona (died 1617), Roman Catholic prelate

== I ==
- Innico d'Avalos d'Aragona (1535–1600), Italian Cardinal from Naples
- Isabella d'Aragona (1470–1524), Duchess of Milan by marriage

== J ==
- Joaquin Anastase Pignatelli d'Aragona, 16th Count of Fuentes, 2nd Duke of Solferino (1724–1776), Hispano-Italian advisor and diplomat

== L ==
- Ludovico D'Aragona (1876–1961), Italian socialist politician
- Luigi d'Aragona (1474–1519), Italian Roman Catholic cardinal

== M ==
- Maria d'Aragona (1503–1568), daughter of Duke Ferdinando di Montalto and Catalina Cardona
- Marianna Panciatichi Ximenes d’Aragona (1835–1919), Italian malacologist

== O ==
- Orlando d'Aragona (1296–1361), illegitimate son of Frederick II of Sicily
- Ottavio Acquaviva d'Aragona (1560–1612), Italian Roman Catholic cardinal and archbishop
- Ottavio Acquaviva d'Aragona (1609–1674), Roman Catholic cardinal

== R ==
- Roberto Sanseverino d'Aragona (1418–1487), Italian condottiero

== S ==
- Sancha d'Aragona (1186–1241), daughter of King Alfonso II of Aragon and Sancha of Castile
- Semiramide d'Appiano d'Aragona (1464–1523), Italian noblewoman
- Simeone Tagliavia d'Aragona (1550–1604), Sicilian cardinal and bishop
- Sulpicio Acquaviva d'Aragona (died 1494), Roman Catholic prelate

== T ==
- Tommaso Acquaviva d'Aragona (1600–1672), Roman Catholic prelate
- Troiano Acquaviva d'Aragona (1696–1747), Italian cardinal and Catholic archbishop
- Tullia d'Aragona (1501–1556), Italian poet and philosopher

== V ==
- Vinciguerra d'Aragona (14th century), eldest son of Sanciolo d'Aragona and Lucia Palizzi
