= Lorenzo de' Medici (disambiguation) =

Lorenzo de' Medici (1449–1492), or Lorenzo the Magnificent, was an Italian statesman, banker, de facto ruler of the Florentine Republic and patron of Renaissance culture.

Lorenzo de' Medici may also refer to:

== People ==
- Lorenzo the Elder (1395–1440)
- Lorenzo di Pierfrancesco de' Medici (1463–1503)
- Lorenzo de' Medici, Duke of Urbino (1492–1519)
- Lorenzino de' Medici (1514–1548), or Lorenzaccio
- Lorenzo de' Medici (1599–1648), seventh child of Ferdinando I de' Medici, Grand Duke of Tuscany

== Other uses ==
- Lorenzo de' Medici School, in Florence, Italy

== See also ==
- Lorenzo De Medici Sweat (1818–1898), an American politician
- Lorenzaccio, an 1834 play by Alfred de Musset
- Lorenzaccio (film), 1951
- Lorenzaccio (horse) (1965–1983)
