= Madia (disambiguation) =

Madia is a genus of herbs. Madia may also refer to

- Madia (surname)
- Madia (furniture) that was used in the 16 century
- Madia, a subgroup of Burarra people in Australia
- Madia Gond, a tribe in Maharashtra State, India
