= Romolo de Valentibus =

Most Reverend Romolo de Valentibus
- Bishop of Conversano
- Church: Catholic Church
- Diocese: Diocese of Conversano
- In office: 1561–1579
- Predecessor: Giovanni Francesco Lottini
- Successor: Francesco Maria Sforza

Personal details
- Died: 1579 Conversano, Italy

Romolo de Valentibus (died 1579) was a Roman Catholic prelate who served as Bishop of Conversano (1561–1579).

== Biography ==
In 1561, Romolo de Valentibus was appointed during the papacy of Pope Pius IV as Bishop of Conversano. He served as Bishop of Conversano until his death in 1579.

Catholic Church titles
Preceded by Giovanni Francesco Lottini	Bishop of Conversano; 1561–1579	Succeeded by Francesco Maria Sforza
