= Carrozza (surname) =

Carrozza is an Italian surname. Notable people with the surname include:

- Alessandro Carrozza (born 1982), Italian footballer
- Ann-Margaret Carrozza (born 1966), American lawyer and politician
- Carmen Carrozza (1921–2013), American classical accordionist
- Coby Carrozza (born 2001), American swimmer
- Giacomo Antonio Carrozza (died 1560), Italian Roman Catholic prelate
- Kyle A. Carrozza (born 1979), American former animator, voice actor and convicted sex offender
- Luigi Carrozza (born 1969), Swiss baseball player
- Maria Chiara Carrozza (born 1965), Italian engineer and politician
- Robert F. Carrozza (born 1940), Italian-American mobster

== See also ==
- Carozza, surname
- Carrozza (sandwich)
