= Diocese of Conversano-Monopoli =

Latin Catholic diocese in Italy

Coordinates: 40.9667°N 17.1167°E

Diocese of Conversano-Monopoli Dioecesis Conversanensis-Monopolitana Diocesi di Conversano-Monopoli

Catholic
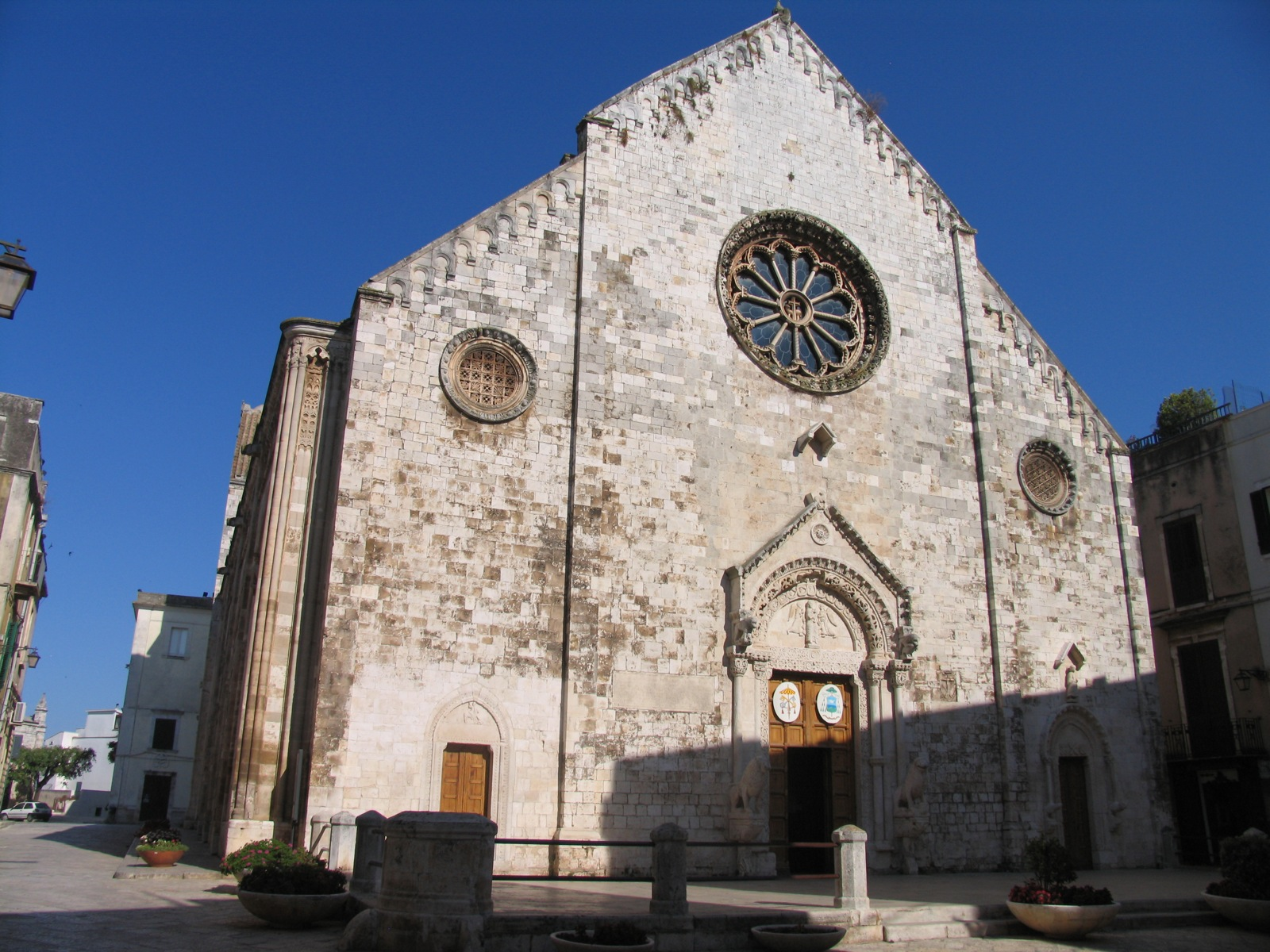
- Conversano Cathedral

Location
- Country: Italy
- Episcopal conference: Episcopal Conference of Italy
- Ecclesiastical region: Puglia
- Ecclesiastical province: Bari-Bitonto
- Metropolitan: Archdiocese of Bari-Bitonto

Statistics
- Area: 1,099 km^{2} (424 sq mi)
- Population: Total; Catholics: (as of 2023); ▼248,754; ▼246,530 (▲99.1%)
- Parishes: 56 (2023)

Information
- Denomination: Catholic Church
- Sui iuris church: Latin Church
- Rite: Roman Rite
- Established: 5th Century
- Cathedral: Conversano Cathedral
- Co-cathedral: Monopoli Cathedral
- Secular priests: ▼81 (diocesan) (2023); ▼39 (religious orders); ▲17 permanent deacons

Current leadership
- Pope: Leo XIV
- Bishop: Giuseppe Favale

Map
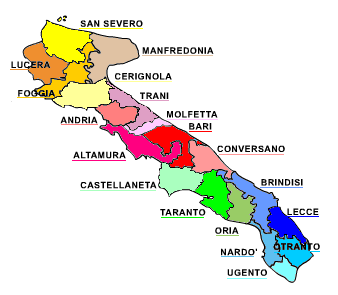

Website
- www.conversano.chiesacattolica.it

The Diocese of Conversano-Monopoli (Latin: Dioecesis Conversanensis-Monopolitana) is a Latin diocese of the Catholic Church in Apulia. It has existed since 1986, when the diocese of Monopoli was united with the historic diocese of Conversano. The diocese is a suffragan of the Archdiocese of Bari-Bitonto.

== History ==
Conversano is the ancient Cupersanum. After the invasion of the Normans, it was for a while the seat of a duchy; later, however, it became a fief of the dukes of Atri.

Local tradition preserves the name of a bishop, Simplicius, who attended the Roman synod of 487 and died in 492, but he belongs to legend, not history. Ferdinando Ughelli prints the narrative of Francesco Giuliano of Conversano concerning Simplicius, but states that it seems to him to be highly suspect, and maybe deliberately invented falsehoods or corrupt, since there are some things found in it which cannot be true.

The first alleged bishop of Conversano was Hilarius, present at the Roman synod of 501. His name however is a false reading of the acts of the synod; he actually belonged to Tempsa in the Abruzzi, not to Conversano in Apulia.

No other names are recorded up to the episcopate of Leo, mentioned in a document of 1088.

In 1670 (and 1744) the Chapter of the Cathedral of the Assumption of the Body of the Blessed Virgin Mary into Heaven was composed of four dignities (the Archdeacon, the Archpriest, the Cantor and the Primicerius) and twenty-six Canons. In the city of approximately 7,000 inhabitants (1744) there were five religious houses for men and three monasteries for men.

== Bishops ==
=== Diocese of Conversano ===
==== to 1400 ====
...

- Leo (attested 1088)

...

- Cafisius (attested 1179, 1180)
- Guilelmus (attested 1188 – April 1202)
- Ignotus (attested 1207)
- Concilius (attested April 1212 – 9 October 1231)
- Stefano, O.Cist. (attested 1267 – 1274)

...

- Giovanni de Gropi (c. 1283)

...

- Guillelmus (attested 1318, 1321)
- Petrus Baccari (attested 1335, 1342)
- Stefano (7 January 1351 – 1355?)
- Petrus de Ytro (19 February 1356 – )
- Guilelmus (Avignon Obedience)
- Angelo de Cupersano, O.Min. (12 July 1393 – ) (Avignon Obedience)
- Amicus (Antonius) (Roman Obedience)
- Jacobus ( – 22 December 1399) (Roman Obedience)

==== 1400 to 1600 ====
- Franciscus
- Stefano de Alfano (9 March 1403 – 1423)
- Antonio Guidotti (9 Sep 1423 – 1432 Died)

- Marino Orsini (4 November 1432 – 29 April 1437) (Administrator)

- Andrea Veroli (29 Apr 1437 – 25 Sep 1439)
- Donato Bottini, O.E.S.A. (9 October 1439 – 4 September 1448)
- Pietro de Miggola, O.M. (4 September 1448 – 1464)
- Paolo de Torcoli (30 November 1465 – d. 1482)
- Sulpicio Acquaviva d'Aragona (17 Feb 1483 – 1494 Died)
- Vincenzo Pistacchio (1494 – 3 Nov 1499 Appointed, Bishop of Bitetto)
- Donato Acquaviva d'Aragona (1499 – 1528 Died)
- Antonio Sanseverino, O.S.Io.Hieros. (28 Jul 1529 – 11 Feb 1534 Resigned)
- Giacomo Antonio Carrozza (1534 – 1560 Died)
- Giovanni Francesco Lottini (1560 – 1561 Resigned)
- Romolo de Valentibus (1561 – 1579 Died)
- Francesco Maria Sforza (1579 – 1605 Died)

==== 1600 to 1800 ====
- Pietro Capullio, O.F.M. Conv. (31 Aug 1605 – 24 Jun 1625 Died)
- Vincenzo Martinelli (bishop), O.P. (18 Aug 1625 – 20 Sep 1632)
- Antonio Brunachio (24 Nov 1632 – 1 Jan 1638 Died)
- Agostino Ferentillo (19 Apr 1638 – 7 Sep 1641 Died)
- Pietro Paolo Bonsi (26 May 1642 – 1658 Died)
- Giuseppe Palermo (8 Dec 1658 – 1 Sep 1670)
- Giovanni Stefano Sanarica (Senarega), O.S.B. (23 Feb 1671 – 16 Jun 1679 Died)
- Andrea Brancaccio, C.R. (13 Jan 1681 – 18 Apr 1701)
- Filippo Meda (23 Jan 1702 – 18 Jul 1733 Died)
- Giovanni Macario Valenti (28 Sep 1733 – 10 Apr 1744 Died)
- Filippo Felice del Prete (13 Apr 1744 – 22 Dec 1751 Died)
- Michele di Tarsia, C.P.O. (24 Jan 1752 – 7 May 1772 Died)
- Fabio Maria Palumbo, C.R. (7 Sep 1772 – 18 Mar 1786 Died)
- Nicola Vecchi (27 Feb 1792 – 18 Dec 1797)

==== 1800 to 1986 ====
- Gennaro Carelli (18 Dec 1797 – 3 Mar 1818 Died)
- Nicola Carelli (21 Feb 1820 – 14 Apr 1826 Died)
- Giovanni De Simone, C.M. (3 Jul 1826 – 13 Aug 1847 Died)
- Giuseppe-Maria Mucedola (11 Dec 1848 – 22 Mar 1865 Died)
- Salvatore Silvestris, C.SS.R. (23 Feb 1872 – 14 Feb 1879 Died)
- Augusto Antonio Vicentini (12 May 1879 – 13 May 1881)
- Casimiro Gennari (13 May 1881 – 6 Feb 1897)
- Antonio Lamberti (19 Apr 1897 – 12 Aug 1917 Died)
- Domenico Lancellotti (14 Mar 1918 – 9 Jun 1930 Died)
- Domenico Argnani (30 Sep 1931 – 15 Jun 1935)
- Gregorio Falconieri (12 Sep 1935 – 24 May 1964 Retired)
- Antonio D'Erchia (21 Jan 1970 – 30 Sep 1986) (Appointed Bishop of the renamed Conversano-Monopoli)

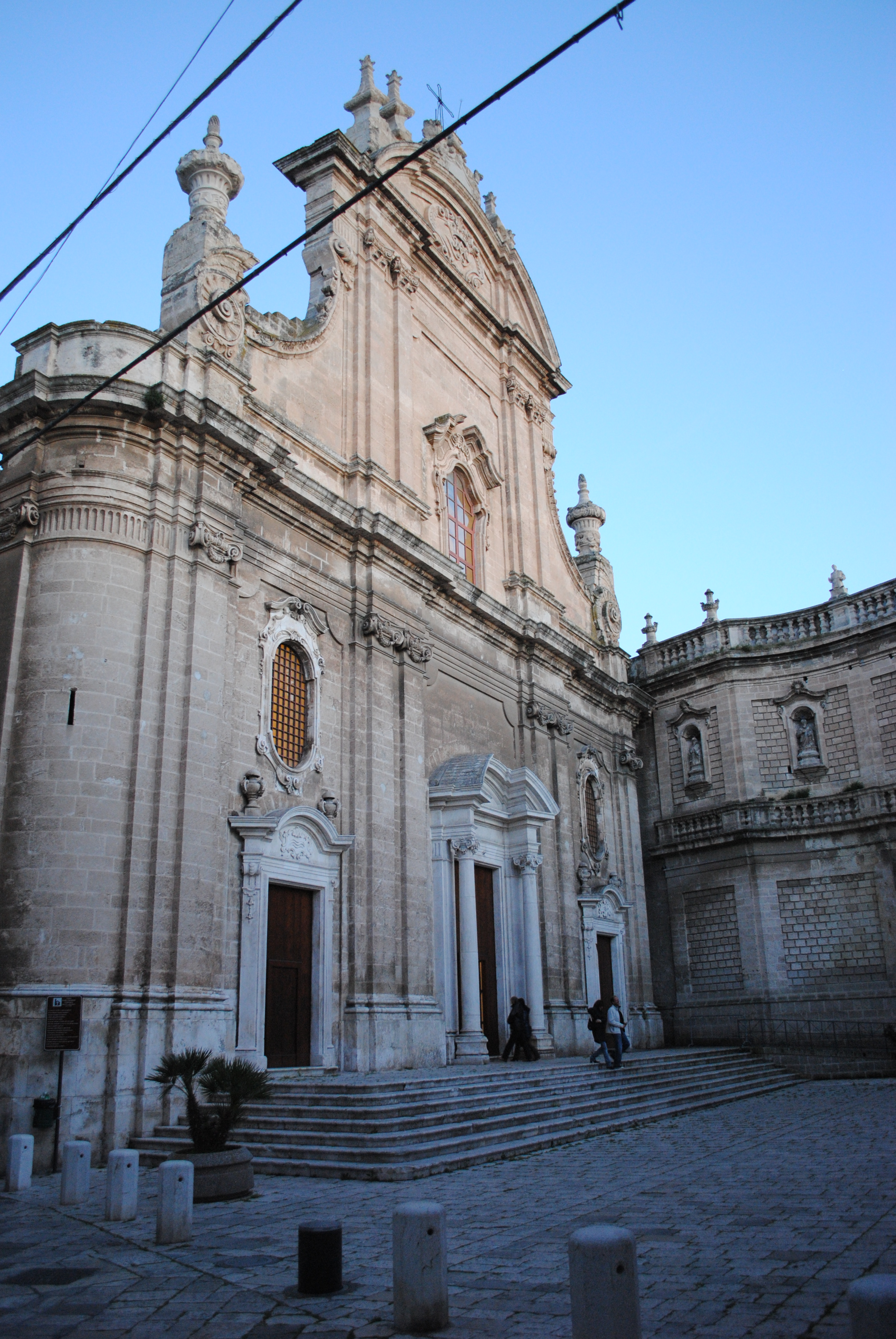
Co-cathedral in Monopoli

=== Diocese of Conversano-Monopoli ===
United: 30 September 1986 with Diocese of Monopoli

- Antonio D'Erchia (30 Sep 1986 – 11 Feb 1987 Retired)
- Domenico Padovano (13 Feb 1987 – 5 Feb 2016 Retired)
- Giuseppe Favale (5 Feb 2016 – )

== Books ==
=== Reference Works ===
- Eubel, Conradus, ed. (1913). Hierarchia catholica, Tomus 1 (second ed.). Münster: Libreria Regensbergiana. (in Latin)
- Eubel, Conradus, ed. (1914). Hierarchia catholica, Tomus 2 (second ed.). Münster: Libreria Regensbergiana. (in Latin)
- Eubel, Conradus, ed. (1923). Hierarchia catholica, Tomus 3 (second ed.). Münster: Libreria Regensbergiana.
- Gams, Pius Bonifatius (1873). Series episcoporum Ecclesiae catholicae: quotquot innotuerunt a beato Petro apostolo. Ratisbon: Typis et Sumptibus Georgii Josephi Manz. pp. 946–947. (Use with caution; obsolete)
- Gauchat, Patritius (Patrice) (1935). Hierarchia catholica IV (1592-1667). Münster: Libraria Regensbergiana. (in Latin)
- Ritzler, Remigius; Sefrin, Pirminus (1952). Hierarchia catholica medii et recentis aevi V (1667-1730). Patavii: Messagero di S. Antonio. (in Latin)
- Ritzler, Remigius; Sefrin, Pirminus (1958). Hierarchia catholica medii et recentis aevi VI (1730-1799). Patavii: Messagero di S. Antonio. (in Latin)
- Ritzler, Remigius; Sefrin, Pirminus (1968). Hierarchia Catholica medii et recentioris aevi sive summorum pontificum, S. R. E. cardinalium, ecclesiarum antistitum series... A pontificatu Pii PP. VII (1800) usque ad pontificatum Gregorii PP. XVI (1846) (in Latin). Vol. VII. Monasterii: Libr. Regensburgiana.
- Ritzler, Remigius; Pirminus Sefrin (1978). Hierarchia catholica Medii et recentioris aevi... A Pontificatu PII PP. IX (1846) usque ad Pontificatum Leonis PP. XIII (1903) (in Latin). Vol. VIII. Il Messaggero di S. Antonio.
- Pięta, Zenon (2002). Hierarchia catholica medii et recentioris aevi... A pontificatu Pii PP. X (1903) usque ad pontificatum Benedictii PP. XV (1922) (in Latin). Vol. IX. Padua: Messagero di San Antonio. ISBN 978-88-250-1000-8.

=== Studies ===
- Avino, Vincenzio d' (1848). Cenni storici sulle chiese arcivescovili, vescovili, e prelatizie (nullius) del regno delle due Sicilie (in Italian). Naples: dalle stampe di Ranucci. pp. 220–221.
- Graevius, Joannes Georgius; Burmann, Peter (1723). Thesaurus antiquitatum et historiarum Italiae ...: Campaniae, Neapolis, Magnae Graeciae ... (in Latin). Vol. Tomi Noni, Pars Quinta (IX.5). Lugduni Batavorum: Petrus Vander Aa. pp. 68–76.
- Kamp, Norbert (1975). Kirche und Monarchie im staufischen Königreich Sizilien: I. Prosopographische Grundlegung, Bistumer und Bistümer und Bischöfe des Konigreichs 1194–1266: 2. Apulien und Calabrien München: Wilhelm Fink 1975.
- Kehr, Paulus Fridolin (1962). Italia pontificia. Regesta pontificum Romanorum. Vol. IX: Samnia – Apulia – Lucania. Berlin: Weidmann. (in Latin), pp. 358–368.
- Lanzoni, Francesco (1927). Le diocesi d'Italia dalle origini al principio del secolo VII (an. 604) (in Italian). Rome: Biblioteca Apostolica Vaticana.
- Rescio, Pierfrancesco (2001). La Cattedrale di Conversano (in Italian). Rubbettino Editore. ISBN 978-88-498-0094-4.
- Sante Simone (1885). Il mostro della Puglia: ossia, la storia del celebre Monastero di S. Benedetto di Conversano (in Italian). Bari: Tip. Fratelli Pansini fu S.
- Ughelli, Ferdinando; Coleti, Niccolò (1721). Italia sacra, sive De Episcopis Italiae (in Latin). Vol. Tomus septimus (VII). Venice: apud Sebastianum Coleti. pp. 700–720.
