= Vincenzo Pistacchio =

Italian Roman Catholic prelate

Most Reverend Vincenzo Pistacchio
- Bishop of Bitetto
- Church: Catholic Church
- Diocese: Diocese of Bitetto
- In office: 1499–1518
- Predecessor: Sulpicio Acquaviva d'Aragona
- Successor: Donato Acquaviva d'Aragona
- Previous post: Bishop of Bitetto (1482–1483)

Vincenzo Pistacchio was a Roman Catholic prelate who served as Bishop of Bitetto (1499–1518) and Bishop of Conversano (1494–1499).

In 1494, Vincenzo Pistacchio was appointed by Pope Alexander VI as Bishop of Conversano. On 3 November 1499, he was appointed by Pope Alexander VI as Bishop of Bitetto. He served as Bishop of Bitetto until his resignation in 1518.

== External links and additional sources ==
- Cheney, David M. "Diocese of Conversano-Monopoli". Catholic-Hierarchy.org. (for Chronology of Bishops) ^{[self-published]}
- Chow, Gabriel. "Diocese of Conversano-Monopoli (Italy)". GCatholic.org. (for Chronology of Bishops) ^{[self-published]}

Catholic Church titles
Preceded by Sulpicio Acquaviva d'Aragona	Bishop of Conversano; 1494–1499	Succeeded by Donato Acquaviva d'Aragona
Preceded by Sulpicio Acquaviva d'Aragona	Bishop of Bitetto; 1499–1518	Succeeded by Andreas Mozenicus
