= Giacomo Antonio Carrozza =

Most Reverend Giacomo Antonio Carrozza
- Church: Catholic Church
- Diocese: Diocese of Conversano
- In office: 1534–1560
- Predecessor: Antonio Sanseverino
- Successor: Giovanni Francesco Lottini

Personal details
- Died: 1560 Conversano, Italy

Giacomo Antonio Carrozza (died 1560) was a Roman Catholic prelate who served as Bishop of Conversano (1534–1560).

== Biography ==
In 1534, Giacomo Antonio Carrozza was appointed during the papacy of Pope Clement VII as Bishop of Conversano. He served as Bishop of Conversano until his death in 1560.

Catholic Church titles
Preceded by Antonio Sanseverino	Bishop of Conversano; 1534–1560	Succeeded by Giovanni Francesco Lottini
