= Francesco Gaeta (bishop) =

Most Reverend Francesco Gaeta
- Bishop of Bitetto
- Church: Catholic Church
- Diocese: Diocese of Bitetto
- In office: 1655–1669
- Predecessor: Marco Antonio Tomati
- Successor: Gaspare Toralto

Orders
- Consecration: 14 September 1655 by Giulio Cesare Sacchetti

Personal details
- Born: 1605 Salerno, Italy
- Died: 2 March 1669 (age 64) Bitetto, Italy

Francesco Gaeta or Francesco Caieta (1605 – 2 March 1669) was a Roman Catholic prelate who served as Bishop of Bitetto (1655–1669).

== Biography ==
Francesco Gaeta was born in Salerno, Italy in 1605. On 30 August 1655, he was appointed during the papacy of Pope Alexander VII as Bishop of Bitetto. On 14 September 1655, he was consecrated bishop by Giulio Cesare Sacchetti, Cardinal-Bishop of Frascati, with Giovanni Alfonso Puccinelli, Archbishop of Manfredonia, and Francesco Gheri, Bishop of Cervia, serving as co-consecrators. He served as Bishop of Bitetto until his death on 2 March 1669.

== See also ==
- Catholic Church in Italy

Catholic Church titles
Preceded by Marco Antonio Tomati	Bishop of Bitetto; 1655–1669	Succeeded by Gaspare Toralto
