= Madia (furniture) =

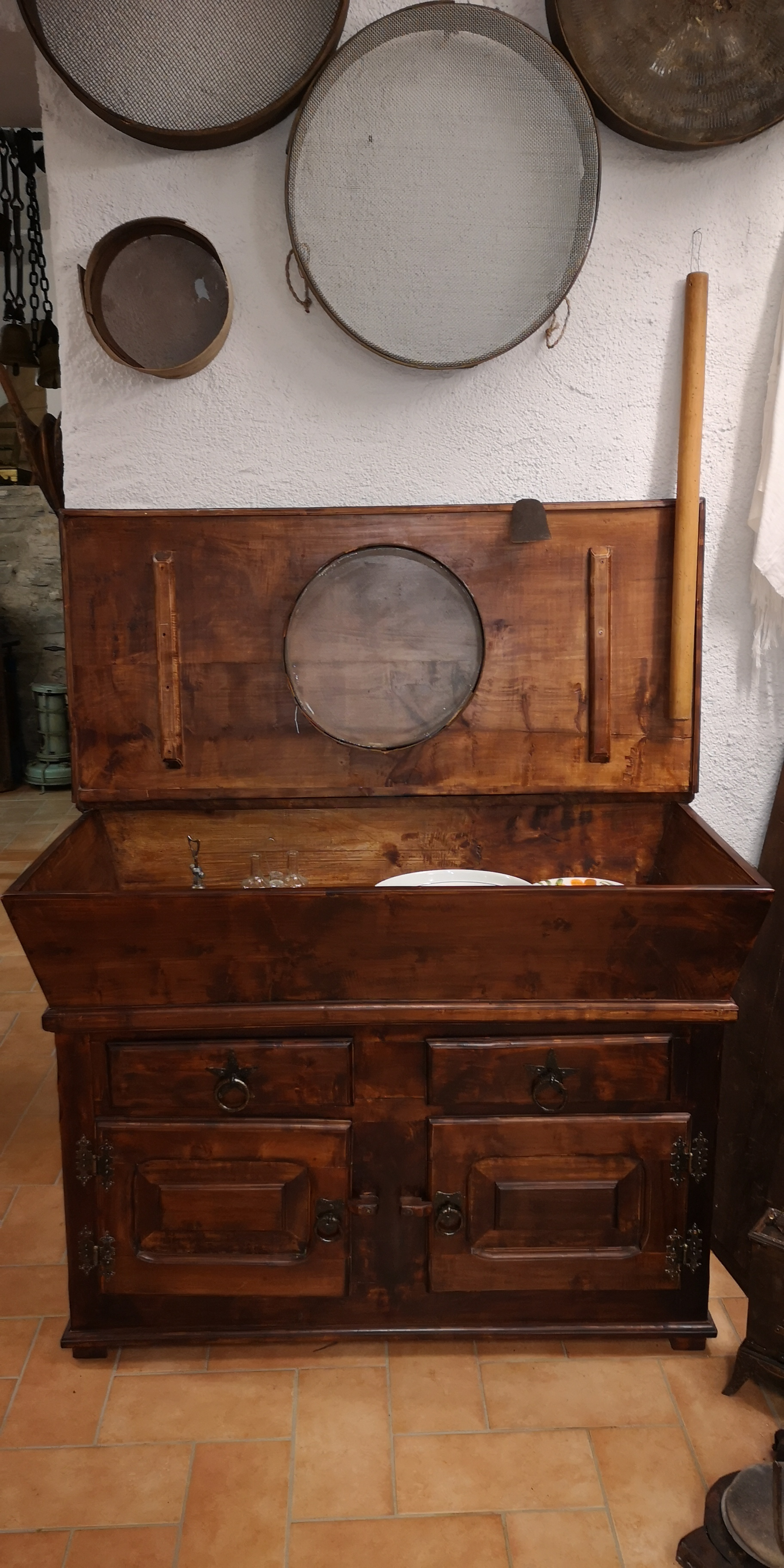

A madia was a piece of furniture used during the High Renaissance period in Italy. A standing cupboard, the madia stored food and dishes, particularly bread, and was sometimes used as a bread trough. It is similar to the cassone, though generally more functional and less ornate. It would usually be found in the kitchen, not in an open area.

One type of madia included a hutch-shaped cupboard, raised on end supports, with several doors and drawers. Others, more typical of the seventeenth century, were sarcophagus-shaped with a slanted top and paneled ends, often with brass studding.

The madia fell into disuse after the eighteenth century.

== See also ==
- Sideboard
- Basilica of the Madonna della Madia
