= Waterfall furniture =

1930s and 1940s Art Deco-based design style

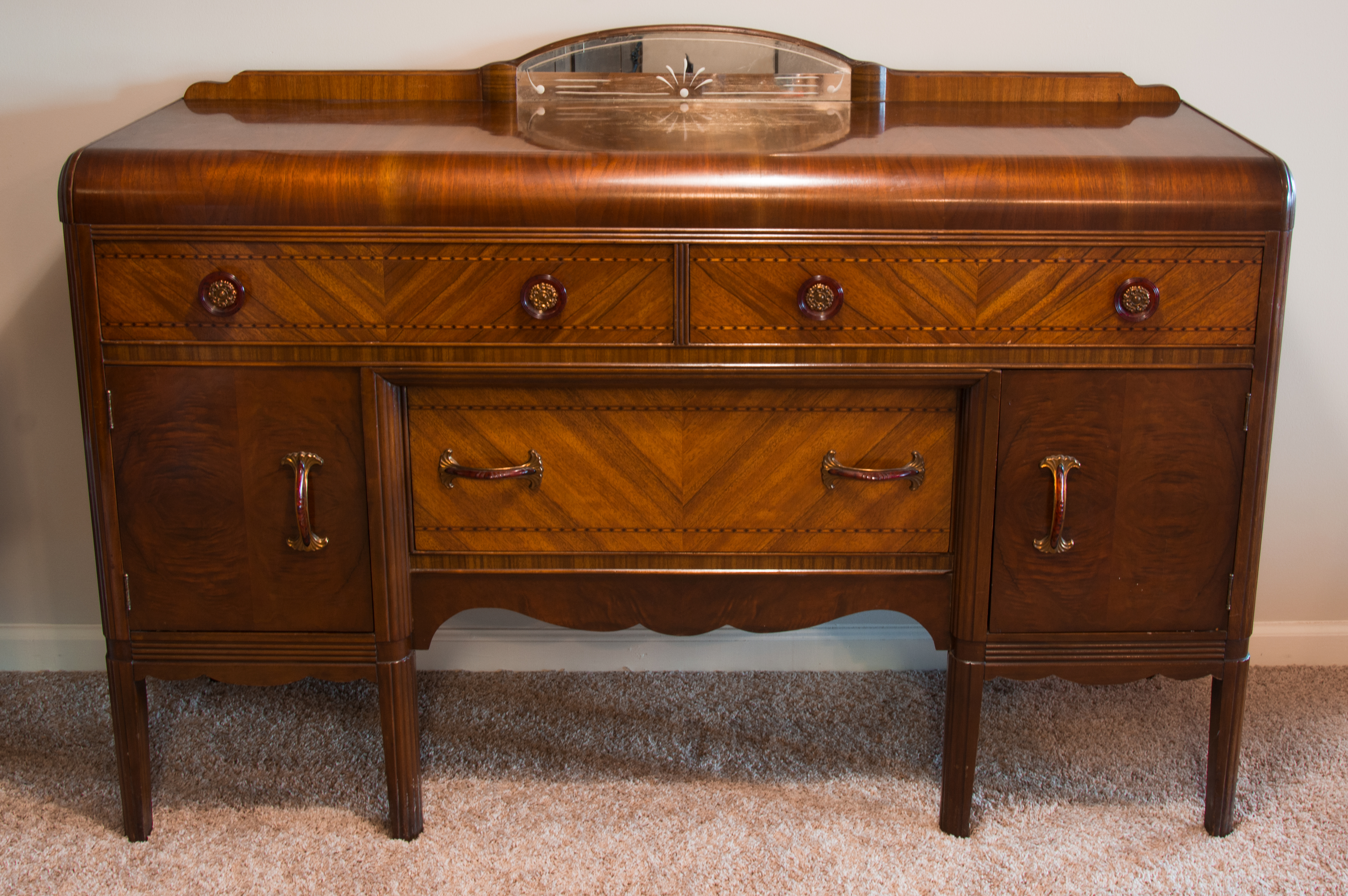
A Waterfall sideboard

Waterfall is a style of furniture design from the 1930s and 1940s. It was the most prevalent variation on Art Deco furniture during this time, primarily created for the mass market and for bedroom suites.

== History ==
The Waterfall style became popular in America after creating a stir at the Paris Colonial Exposition in 1931. A company in Grand Rapids, Michigan was among the first to produce furniture in the style in the United States; their efforts were successful enough to inspire other furniture factories to produce Waterfall furniture, much of which was mass-produced and of poor quality.

== Features ==
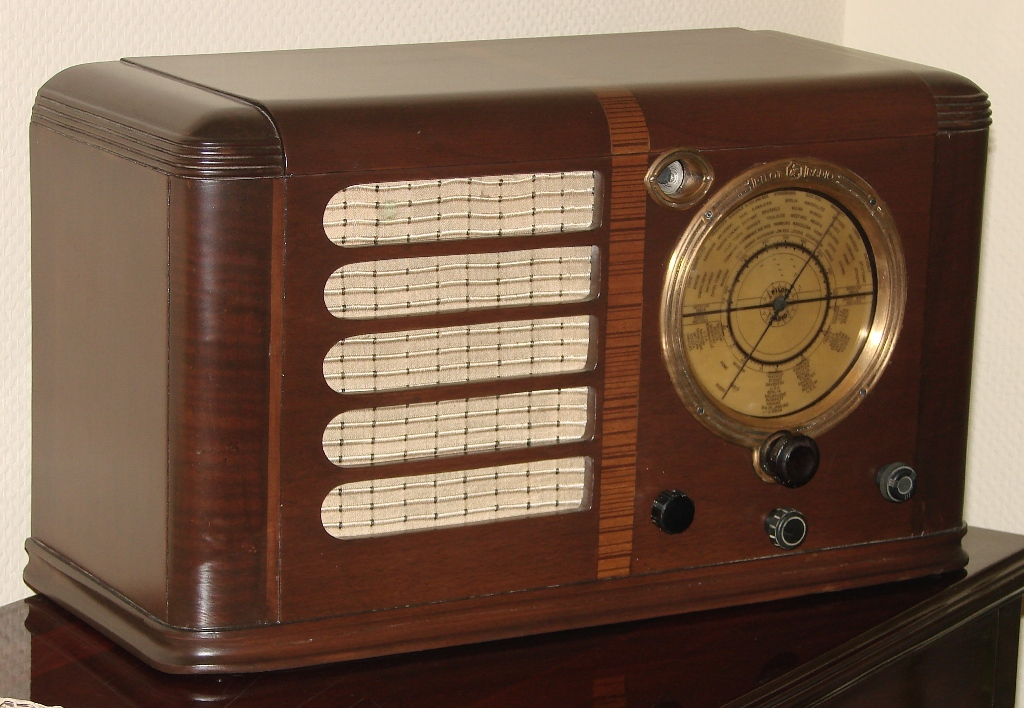
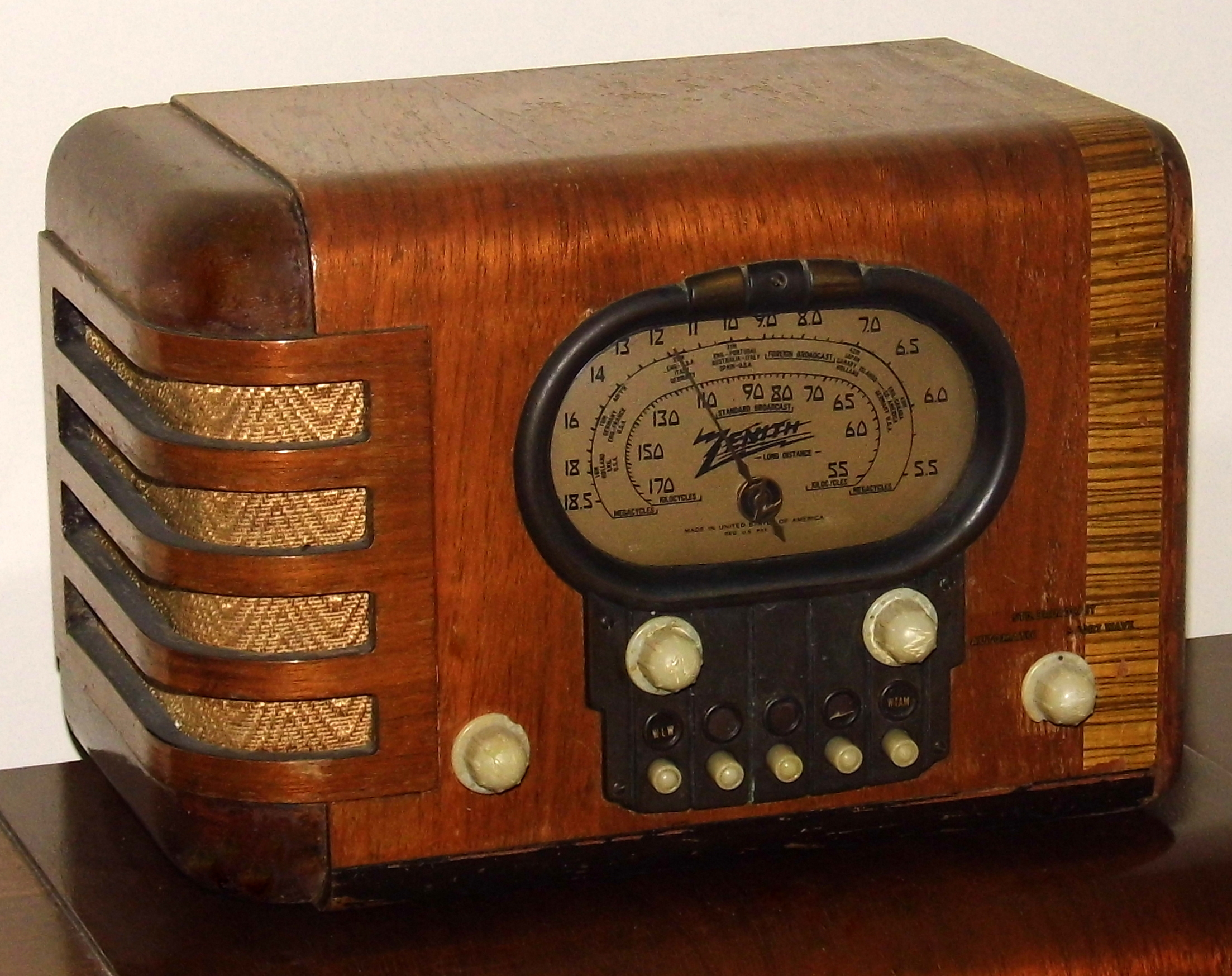
Waterfall-style radios

The style was distinguished by numerous features. It was named "Waterfall" due to its distinctive rounded drops at the edges of all horizontal surfaces, thought to resemble a flowing waterfall. Pieces in this style were usually finished with a blond veneer, though a small percentage were finished in a darker walnut finish. Drawer faces on more expensive Waterfall furniture often featured unusual designs such as decorative crossbanding and bookmatched panels. Handles were typically of orange Bakelite and brass, and some vanities had illuminated spheres or frosted panels. Pieces in this style were sometimes paired with oversized round mirrors with etched trim. The furniture was made with plywood, which would be molded during manufacturing. Higher-quality pieces would feature the Waterfall curve in molded plywood where the plywood softened the edges of side corners. Mass-produced Waterfall furniture often simply featured a quarter-round edge.

Waterfall furniture contrasted with boxy walnut or mahogany pieces of the 1920s due to Waterfall's curved lines and its use of imported woods, including blond-colored Carpathian elm and golden padouk.

== See also ==
- Waterfall architecture
