= Edward William Godwin =

British architect

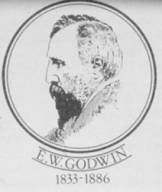
- Born: 26 May 1833; Bristol, England
- Died: 6 October 1886 (aged 53); London, England
- Partner: Ellen Terry (1868–1875)
- Children: Edith Craig; Edward Gordon Craig

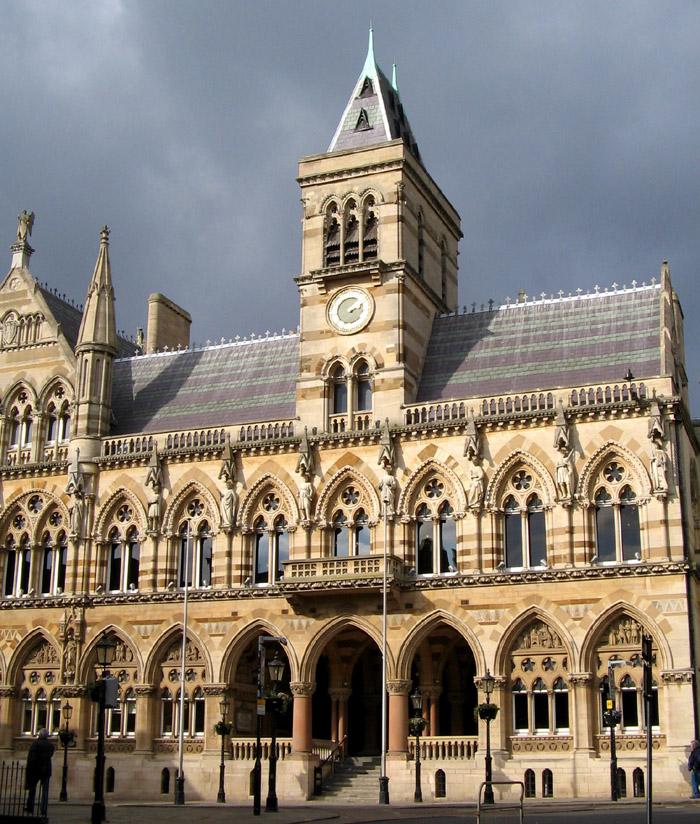
Northampton Guildhall, built 1861–64, displays Godwin's "Ruskinian Gothic" style

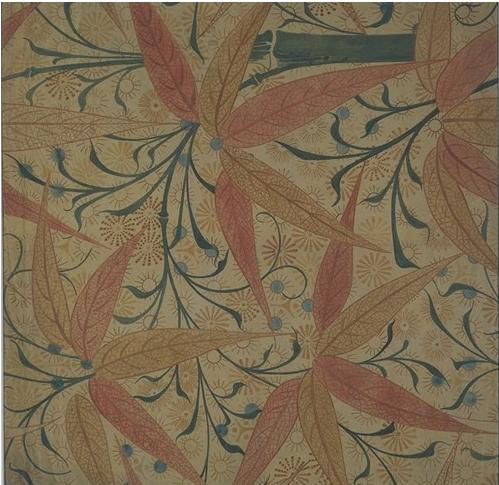
Design, 1872 (V&A Museum no. E.515-1963)

Edward William Godwin (26 May 1833 – 6 October 1886) was a progressive English architect-designer, who began his career working in the strongly polychromatic "Ruskinian Gothic" style of mid-Victorian Britain, inspired by The Stones of Venice, then moved on to provide designs in the "Anglo-Japanese taste" of the Aesthetic movement in the 1870s, after coming into contact with Japanese culture in the 1862 International Exhibition in London. Godwin's influence can be detected in the later Arts and Crafts movement.

His best known early works include The Guild Hall, Northampton, which was his first notable public commission, and Congleton Town Hall, as well as restorations and neo-Gothic additions to Dromore Castle, Limerick and Castle Ashby.

== Biography ==
Apprenticed to an engineer in Bristol, where his architectural training was largely self-taught, Godwin moved to London about 1862, and made the acquaintance of the reform Gothic designer William Burges. As an antiquary, he had a particular interest in medieval costume, furniture and architecture.

Godwin was widowed in 1865; during his affair with the renowned actress Ellen Terry between 1868 and 1874, she retired with him to Hertfordshire, and produced two children: Edith Craig (1869–1947) and Edward Gordon Craig (1872–1966), who became an important actor, designer, director, and theoretical writer of the early 20th century European stage. The affair inspired Godwin to spend much time designing theatrical costumes and scenery. After she returned to the theatre and their connection cooled, Godwin married a young designer in his office, Beatrice/Beatrix Birnie Philip (1857–1896), who bore him a son, Edward. After Godwin's death, she married the painter James Whistler in 1888. Godwin was a frequent contributor to the periodical British Architect and published a number of books on architecture, costume and theatre.

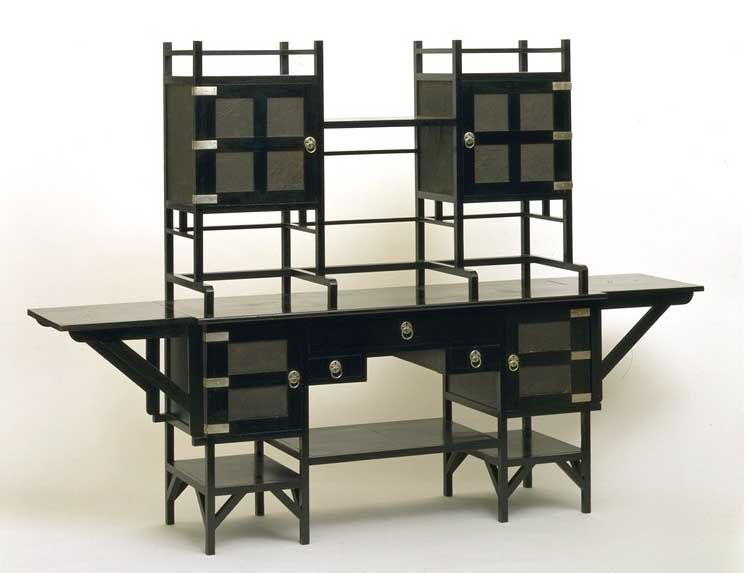
Sideboard of 1867–70 (V&A Museum no. CIRC.38:1 to 5-1953)

To judge from his sketchbooks at the Victoria and Albert Museum, one might have expected an eclectic historicist, but Godwin, by no means a tame reproducer of antiquarian Gothic designs, was among the first to extend the European design repertory to include the arts of Japan, which had been opened to the Western world in 1853. His Anglo-Japanese style of furniture, mostly executed with an ebonized finish, was designed for Dromore Castle and his own use from 1867. Similar designs produced later by the firms of William Watt and Collinson & Lock also emphasised the stripped-down "Anglo-Japanese taste" pared of merely decorative touches. The spirit of Japan, rather than mere details, is strongly revealed in a black cabinet Godwin designed for Collinson & Lock, now at the Museum of Modern Art, New York.

In the 1870s and 1880s Godwin's designs could be found at Liberty and Co.; his wallpapers, printed textiles, tiles, "art furniture" or metalwork set the tone in houses of those with an artistic and progressive bent. Oscar Wilde was among his clients, describing him as "one of the most artistic spirits of this century", as was Princess Louise, for whom he designed a studio at Kensington Palace.

From 1876, Godwin designed houses for the new garden suburb of Bedford Park, Chiswick. His designs were thought poor, as they had steep staircases, a toilet in the bathroom, relatively small rooms, and narrow corridors. Only a few of his houses were built; they are taller and narrower than those built by other architects.

In 1877 the painter James Whistler, himself a connoisseur of Japanese prints, commissioned Godwin to build him a house in Tite Street, Chelsea, which Godwin completed the following year, in spite of its being initially objected to by The Metropolitan Board of Works. However, Whistler's bankruptcy in 1879 forced the sale of the house along with the rest of the painter's effects. The buyer of the house, an art critic, made alterations that Whistler and Godwin deplored. (The White House was demolished in the 1960s.) Whistler and Godwin shared an interest in Chinese and Japanese art and collaborated over The White House and in a number of projects involving furniture and interior design, notably "Harmony in Yellow and Gold: The Butterfly Cabinet". When Whistler exhibited his radical Impressionist paintings of Venice, Godwin entirely redecorated the exhibition galleries to complement them.

Godwin then designed another house in Tite Street for Archibald Stuart-Wortley and Carlo Pellegrini, later sold to Slingsby Bethell. A third house in Tite Street was commissioned by Frank Miles and completed the following year, 1878, originally number 1 but still standing and now numbered 44. Miles lived there, initially with his friend Oscar Wilde, until committed to an asylum in 1887, after which it was sold by his family to the artist, G.P. Jacomb-Hood.

In 1881, Godwin designed a new entrance for the premises in Bond Street of the Fine Art Society, a progressive venue for exhibitions of new art, where one of the first exhibitions of Japanese woodblock prints was held.

Godwin died on 6 October 1886 in London from complications following an operation to remove kidney stones.
