= Elena Barozzi =

Venetian patrician (1514–1580)

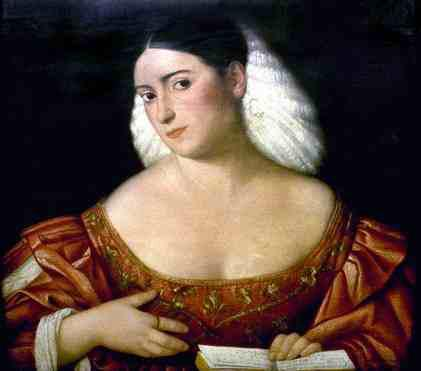
Portrait de Elena Barozzi, unknown artist

Elena Barozzi (1514 – 1580) was a celebrated Venetian patrician.

== Life ==
Elena's reputation for her elegance is praised by the poets and painters of her century. Titian and Giorgio Vasari portrayed it. The poet Lelio Capilupi dedicated the ballad to her Ne l'amar e fredd'onde si bagna, set to music by Adrian Willaert. The poet Fortunio Spira compared her to the beauties of classical antiquity, while the writer Lodovico Domenichi described her as Greek for beauty and Roman for personality, like Lucretia.

For her fine intellectuality Barozzi was admired and courted by the finest men of her time. She had a relationship and an illegitimate daughter with Lorenzino de' Medici, named Lorenzina (1547–1590), who married Giulio Colonna, but had no children.
