= Lorenzaccio =

1834 play by Alfred de Musset

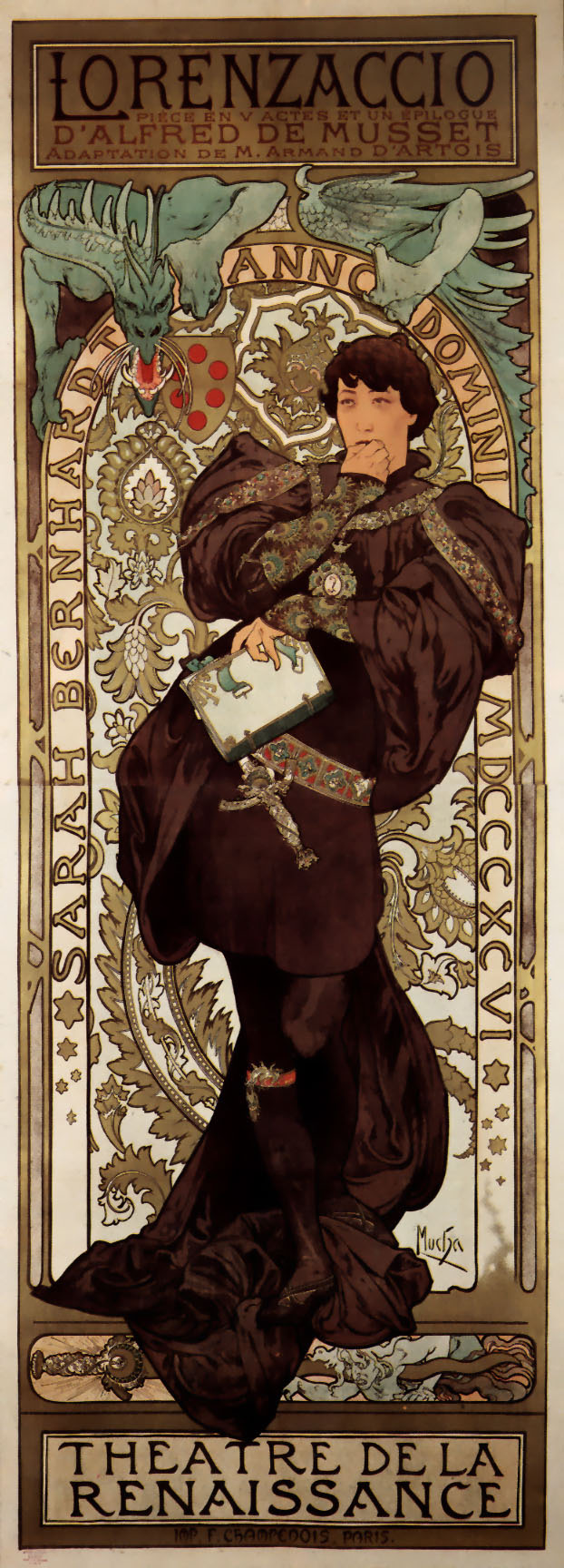
Alphonse Mucha poster for Lorenzaccio starring Sarah Bernhardt (1896)

Lorenzaccio is a French play of the Romantic period written by Alfred de Musset in 1834, set in 16th-century Florence, and depicting Lorenzino de' Medici, who killed Florence's tyrant, Alessandro de' Medici, his cousin. Having engaged in debaucheries to gain the Duke's confidence, he loses the trust of Florence's citizens, thus earning the insulting surname "Lorenzaccio". Though he kills Alessandro, he knows he will never return to his former state. Since opponents to the tyrant's regime fail to use Alessandro's death as a way to overthrow the dukedom and establish a republic, Lorenzo's action does not appear to aid the people's welfare.

Written soon after the July revolution of 1830, at the start of the July Monarchy, when King Louis Philippe I overthrew King Charles X of France, the play contains many cynical comments on the lack of true republican sentiments in the face of violent overthrow.

The play was inspired by George Sand's Une conspiration en 1537, in turn inspired by Varchi's chronicles. Like much of Romantic tragedy, including plays by Victor Hugo, it was influenced by William Shakespeare's Hamlet.

== Summary ==
Alessandro de' Medici, Duke of Florence, aided by Lorenzo de' Medici, takes away a girl under her brother's nose. He wishes to complain to the duke, but it is the duke who is taking her away. In Lorenzaccio's palace, his uncle Bindo Altoviti and Venturi, a gentleman, wish to know from Lorenzaccio whether he will join their conspiracy against the duke. But when the duke, as suggested by his cousin, offers them a promotion and privileges, despite their republican talk, they immediately accept. Alessandro serves as model for a portrait, when Lorenzaccio takes his coat of mail and throws it in a well. One of the duke's men, Salviati, covered in blood, appears, saying that Pietro Strozzi and his brother, Tomaso, attacked him. The duke orders their arrest, so that the Strozzi family are up in arms to free them. Lorenzaccio plans to seduce Catherine. Meanwhile, Pietri and Tomaso are freed and learn of their sister's death by poison at the hands of Salviati's servant. The cardinal of Cibo scolds his sister-in-law for not being able to hold her lover for more than three days. Unheeding his appeal to return to him, she reveals to her husband her adultery with the duke. The night he proposes to kill his cousin, Lorenzaccio warns noblemen to prepare for revolt, but none of them believe he'll do it. The cardinal warns the duke of Lorenzaccio, but he dismisses his warnings and follows his cousin to his bedroom, where Lorenzaccio kills him. Cosimo de' Medici is elected as the new duke. With the duke dead, the Strozzi conspiracy does not achieve anything, nor are republican sentiments heard of, except for some massacred students. Lorenzaccio is assassinated and the cardinal gives the ducal crown to Cosimo de' Medici on behalf of Pope Paul III and Emperor Charles V.

== Performances, translations, and adaptions ==
The play was published in the spirit of a closet drama—intended to be read rather than staged, because of its complexity, length, numerous characters and changes in scenery—so that no production of the play took place during Musset's lifetime.

However, it has been staged since, first by Sarah Bernhardt as a star vehicle for herself in 1896, and later with Gérard Philipe in the title role in the 1950s in Paris, a production which reached Broadway in the French version presented by the Théâtre national populaire and directed by Jean Vilar in 1958 for seven performances.

The Stratford Festival in Canada staged a production in 1972 that initially toured to the Guthrie Theater in Minneapolis and the National Arts Centre in Ottawa, and then ran for 24 performances during the Festival's summer season.

Franco Zeffirelli directed 27 performances of the play at the Comédie-Française, Paris in September - October 1977.

The play was performed in 1983 at the National Theatre, London, in a translation by John Fowles, with Greg Hicks in the title role. In 1977, under the title The Lorenzaccio Story, a version of the play by Paul Thompson, was performed at The Other Place, Stratford-upon-Avon, with Peter McEnery in the leading role. In 1978, the play was performed in Buenos Aires, starring Rodolfo Bebán and Alfredo Alcón.

In 2007 there appeared an English-language adaption by the American playwright John Strand.

A modern re-adaptation of Lorenzaccio, titled Up For Grabs America, was also performed in 2017, at the Medicine Show Theatre, New York. The play was re-written and directed by Rayyan Dabbous and it is described as a "political satire staged in the year of Donald Trump's election." Its main character is named Lorenzo, who is the White House's "Chief of Staff."
