= Carozza =

Carozza is a surname. Notable people with the surname include:

- Antonello Carozza (born 1985), Italian singer-songwriter
- Mary Beth Carozza (born 1961), American politician
- Paul Carozza (born 1966), Australian rugby player

== See also ==
- Carrozza, racehorse
- Carrozza (surname)
