= Roman Catholic Diocese of Bitetto =

Coordinates: 41.0409°N 16.7486°E

The Diocese of Bitetto (Latin Dioecesis Bitectensis) was a Roman Catholic diocese in Italy, located in the town of Bitetto in the province of Bari, Apulia, Italy. In 1818, it was suppressed to the Diocese of Termoli.

== History ==
- 1100: Established as Diocese of Bitetto
- 1818 June 27: Suppressed to the Archdiocese of Bari
- 1968: Restored as Titular Episcopal See of Bitetto

== Bishops ==
=== Diocese of Bitetto ===
Erected: 1100

- Carlo Archamono (23 Mar 1422 – 1432 Died)

...

- Leonardo del Giudice (17 Apr 1452 – 1481 Died)
- Sulpicio Acquaviva d'Aragona (26 Apr 1482 – 17 Feb 1483 Appointed, Bishop of Conversano)
- Vincenzo Pistacchio (3 Nov 1499 – 1518 Resigned)
- Andreas Mozenicus (19 Jun 1522 – )
- Giovanni Salviati (10 Jan 1532 – 5 Mar 1539 Resigned)
- Valeriano Muti (5 Jul 1599 – 15 Nov 1602 Appointed, Bishop of Città di Castello)
- Baldassarre Pusterla (7 Apr 1603 – 1605 Died)
- Livio Limatola (13 Mar 1606 – 1611 Died)
- Giulio Mattei (18 May 1611 – 1624 Died)
- Michael Masserotti (Misserotti), O.F.M. Conv. (26 Feb 1624 – 1630 Died)
- Sigismondo Taddei (8 Jan 1631 – 27 Nov 1641 Appointed, Bishop of Caiazzo)
- Marco Antonio Tomati (16 Dec 1641 – 1655 Resigned)
- Francesco Gaeta (Caieta) (30 Aug 1655 – 2 Mar 1669 Died)
- Gaspare Toralto (3 Jun 1669 – 16 Nov 1676 Appointed, Bishop of Tricarico)
- Giacomo Santoro (26 Apr 1677 – Nov 1683 Died)
- Francesco Onofrio Hodierna (24 Apr 1684 – 4 Jan 1717 Appointed, Bishop of Valva e Sulmona)
- Gioacchino Francesco Caprini (Carpi) (24 Jan 1718 – 20 Apr 1729 Died)
- Lazzaro Sangiovanni (6 Jul 1729 – 5 Oct 1736 Died)
- Francesco Franco (19 Nov 1736 – 10 May 1745 Appointed, Bishop of Nicotera)
- Angelo Maria Marculli, O.S.A. (10 May 1745 – 6 Oct 1770 Died)
- Hyacinthus Maria Barberio, O.F.M. Conv. (4 Mar 1771 – 1 Jan 1798 Died)

== See also ==
- Catholic Church in Italy
