= Giulio Mattei =

17th-century Catholic bishop

Most Reverend Giulio Mattei
- Bishop of Bitetto
- Church: Catholic Church
- Diocese: Roman Catholic Diocese of Bitetto
- In office: 1611–1624
- Predecessor: Livio Limatola
- Successor: Michael Masserotti

Orders
- Consecration: 23 May 1611 by Roberto Francesco Romolo Bellarmino

Personal details
- Born: 1561 Monte San Savini, Italy
- Died: 1624 (age 63) Bitetto, Italy

Giulio Mattei (1561–1624) was a Roman Catholic prelate who served as Bishop of Bitetto (1611–1624).

== Biography ==
Giulio Mattei was born in Monte San Savini, Italy in 1561. On 18 May 1611, he was appointed during the papacy of Pope Paul V as Bishop of Bitetto. On 23 May, he was consecrated bishop by Roberto Francesco Romolo Bellarmino, Cardinal-Priest of San Matteo in Merulana, with Attilio Amalteo, Titular Archbishop of Athenae, and Antonio d'Aquino, Bishop of Sarno, serving as co-consecrators. He served as Bishop of Bitetto until his death in 1624.

Catholic Church titles
Preceded by Livio Limatola	Bishop of Bitetto; 1611–1624	Succeeded by Michael Masserotti
