= Madia (surname) =

Madia is the surname of the following notable people:

- Chunilal Madia (1922–1968), Gujarati author from India
- Giorgio Madia (born 1965), Italian opera and ballet choreographer and stage director
- Kanti Madia, Indian actor, director, producer and playwright
- Marianna Madia (born 1980), Italian politician
- Stefano Madia (1954–2004), Italian film actor
- William Madia (born 1947), American scientist

== See also ==
- Madia (disambiguation)
