= Marco Antonio Tomati (bishop of Bitetto) =

Italian Roman Catholic prelate

Most Reverend Marco Antonio Tomati
- Bishop Emeritus of Bitetto
- Church: Catholic Church
- Diocese: Diocese of Bitetto
- In office: 1641–1655
- Predecessor: Sigismondo Taddei
- Successor: Francesco Gaeta (bishop)

Orders
- Consecration: 22 December 1641 by Ciriaco Rocci

Personal details
- Born: 1591 Caravino, Italy
- Died: 24 January 1665 (age 74) Bitetto, Italy

Marco Antonio Tomati (1591 – 24 January 1665) was a Roman Catholic prelate who served as Bishop of Bitetto (1641–1655).

== Biography ==
Marco Antonio Tomati was born in Caravino, Italy in 1591. On 16 December 1641, he was appointed during the papacy of Pope Urban VIII as Bishop of Bitetto. On 22 December 1641, he was consecrated bishop by Ciriaco Rocci, Cardinal-Priest of San Salvatore in Lauro, with Alfonso Gonzaga, Titular Archbishop of Rhodus, and Alfonso Sacrati, Bishop Emeritus of Comacchio, serving as co-consecrators. He served as Bishop of Bitetto until his resignation in 1655. He died on 24 January 1665.

While bishop, he was the principal co-consecrator of Girolamo Melzi, Bishop of Pavia (1659).

Catholic Church titles
Preceded by Sigismondo Taddei	Bishop of Bitetto; 1641–1655	Succeeded by Francesco Gaeta (bishop)
