= Domenico Padovano =

Italian priest (1940–2019)

- Bishop of Conversano-Monopoli
- Church: Catholic Church
- Diocese: Diocese of Conversano-Monopoli
- In office: 13 February 1987 – 5 February 2016
- Predecessor: Antonio D'Erchia
- Successor: Giuseppe Favale
- Previous posts: Titular Bishop of Mazaca (1982-1987); Auxiliary Bishop of Bitonto (1982-1986); Auxiliary Bishop of Bari (1982-1984)

Orders
- Ordination: 29 June 1965
- Consecration: 24 October 1982 by Andrea Mariano Magrassi

Personal details
- Born: 27 September 1940 Mola di Bari, Province of Bari, Kingdom of Italy
- Died: 10 May 2019 (aged 78) Mola di Bari, Apulia, Italy
- Coat of arms

Domenico Padovano (27 September 1940 – 10 May 2019) was an Italian Catholic prelate.

Born in Mola di Bari, Padovano was ordained to the priesthood in 1965, and held several auxiliary bishop roles of the Archdiocese of Bari-Bitonto during the 1980s. He was appointed Bishop of Conversano-Monopoli in 1987, serving until his retirement in 2016. He was succeeded by Giuseppe Favale.

Padovano died on 10 May 2019 in Mola di Bari, at the age of 78.
