= Sideboard (cards) =

A sideboard, side deck, or side is a set of cards in a collectible card game that are separate from a player's primary deck. It is used to customize a match strategy against an opponent by enabling a player to change the composition of the playing deck.

== Magic: The Gathering ==
In Magic: The Gathering, a player may have a playing deck and an optional sideboard or "side". In a constructed deck format, a sideboard may have up to 15 cards, and the playing deck and sideboard combined may have no more than four copies of one card excepting basic lands. Previous versions of the rules required the optional sideboard to contain exactly 15 cards, and for players to agree to their use before a match. This rule was changed with the prerelease of the Magic 2014 core set, and became standard effective 13 July 2013.

In a limited deck format, all cards not in the playing deck are part of the sideboard, and the playing deck must have at least 40 cards. Constructed Tournaments require a minimum 60 cards in the playing deck, and up to 15 cards in the sideboard. In tournaments, use of the sideboard is the only permitted form of deck alteration, and the list of cards in the sideboard must be registered.

A player may exchange cards between the playing deck and sideboard after any game in a match, but the "deck and sideboard must each be returned to their original composition" before a new match. This exchange is referred to as sideboarding. The number of cards removed from the playing deck need not be the same as the number of cards added to it from the sideboard, but the changes must satisfy the conditions for minimum playing deck size and maximum sideboard size. A player may inspect any sideboard under their control at any time during a game.

Players must present their sideboard face down to the opponent before a match, and allow the opponent to count the number of cards in the sideboard upon request. The sideboard must be set aside before the playing deck is shuffled, and those cards are considered to be outside the game.

The set of cards to include in a sideboard typically supplement a deck's weakness against certain opponent decks, and can affect the gameplay dynamics of a deck. A sideboard can lack versatility because of the limited number of cards it can contain and the diversity of decks that can be constructed. In a sealed deck or booster draft tournament, one strategy is to "pull the questionable" cards from the deck and place them in the sideboard. Cards typically chosen for a sideboard include those that "fulfill multiple purposes or deal with more than one threat".

A small number of cards allow players to interact with their sideboard. Cards that let the player select cards from "outside the game" are limited to the sideboard in sanctioned tournaments. One famous example is the "wish" cycle.

The expansion set Unglued, cards from which are not sanctioned for tournaments, also contains the cards Jester's Sombrero and Look at Me, I'm the DCI to manipulate cards in the sideboard.

== Yu-Gi-Oh! ==
In the Yu-Gi-Oh! Trading Card Game, a player may have a playing deck, an "extra deck" consisting of Fusion Monsters, Synchro Monsters, Xyz Monsters, and Link Monsters and an optional side deck of up to 15 cards. A player may exchange any number of cards between the side deck and the playing or extra deck after each duel, but the number of cards in the side deck after the exchange must be the same as the number of cards before the exchange. Versions of the rules before November 2009 did not allow exchanges between the side deck and the extra deck.

Players must show each other their side decks after shuffling and cutting their playing deck, and record the number of cards in the side deck. If a player exchanges cards after a duel during a multi-duel match (such as in tournament play), the player must demonstrate that the number of cards in the side deck has not changed.

A player may have no more than three copies of "a card that has the same name" (such as different versions of the same card) between the playing deck, extra deck, and side deck, two if the card is included in the semi-limited list, one if the card is included in the limited list, and none if the card is in the forbidden list.

The exchange enables a player to modify the playing deck to suit a game strategy against the opponent.

== Defunct card games ==
=== Dragon Ball Z ===
Dragon Ball Z Collectible Card Game allows players to construct a sensei deck in addition to the main playing deck (known as a life deck), which requires the use of a sensei card. The sensei card counts toward the life deck minimum and maximum size, but cards in the sensei deck do not. The sensei card specifies the maximum size of the sensei deck.

When cards are exchanged between the two decks, the player must show the sensei cards to all opponents for confirmation, but need not show the cards removed from the life deck. The cards removed must be taken from the top of the life deck, then the sensei cards must be shuffled into the life deck. If the player fails to remove the sensei cards from the life deck before the subsequent game begins, that game is forfeited to the opponent.

=== World of Warcraft ===
The World of Warcraft Trading Card Game allows players to use an optional side deck of up to ten cards in some Constructed deck tournaments, and exactly ten cards in Classic Constructed tournament play. The side deck may contain any card allowed in the playing deck for the tournament, and may be used to exchange cards with the main deck. A maximum of four copies of a card having the same name may be included between the playing deck and side deck except for those that are "unlimited".

Most competitive World of Warcraft tournaments require players to register the list of cards in the side deck with the organizers. Once a game begins, players may not inspect their side decks. In a Limited tournament, the side deck consists of all cards "in a player’s card pool that are not being played in the main deck". If a player's deck consists of fewer than 30 cards in Sealed or Draft formats, that player may not use a side deck. Side decks are not used in Contemporary, Core, and Block tournaments.

There are penalties assigned for an illegal side deck list or an illegal side deck. The former results in a warning from tournament organizers, and the latter in a warning or game loss, depending on the tournament. Failure to remove side deck cards from the playing deck before the next game in a tournament results in a game loss, but may be downgraded to a warning in some circumstances.

Some cards or effects enable interaction with the side deck. The hearthing effect of the Hearthstone card is a modifier affecting all players by which players choose equipment cards from the playing or side deck. In tournaments, the card Through the Dark Portal removes all cards from the game except for those in the side deck, which becomes the new playing deck. The card Arcanist Atikan prevents an opponent from exchanging cards between the playing deck and side deck for all remaining games in the match.

== See also ==
- The Sideboard
