= Benedetto Varchi =

Italian humanist, historian and poet

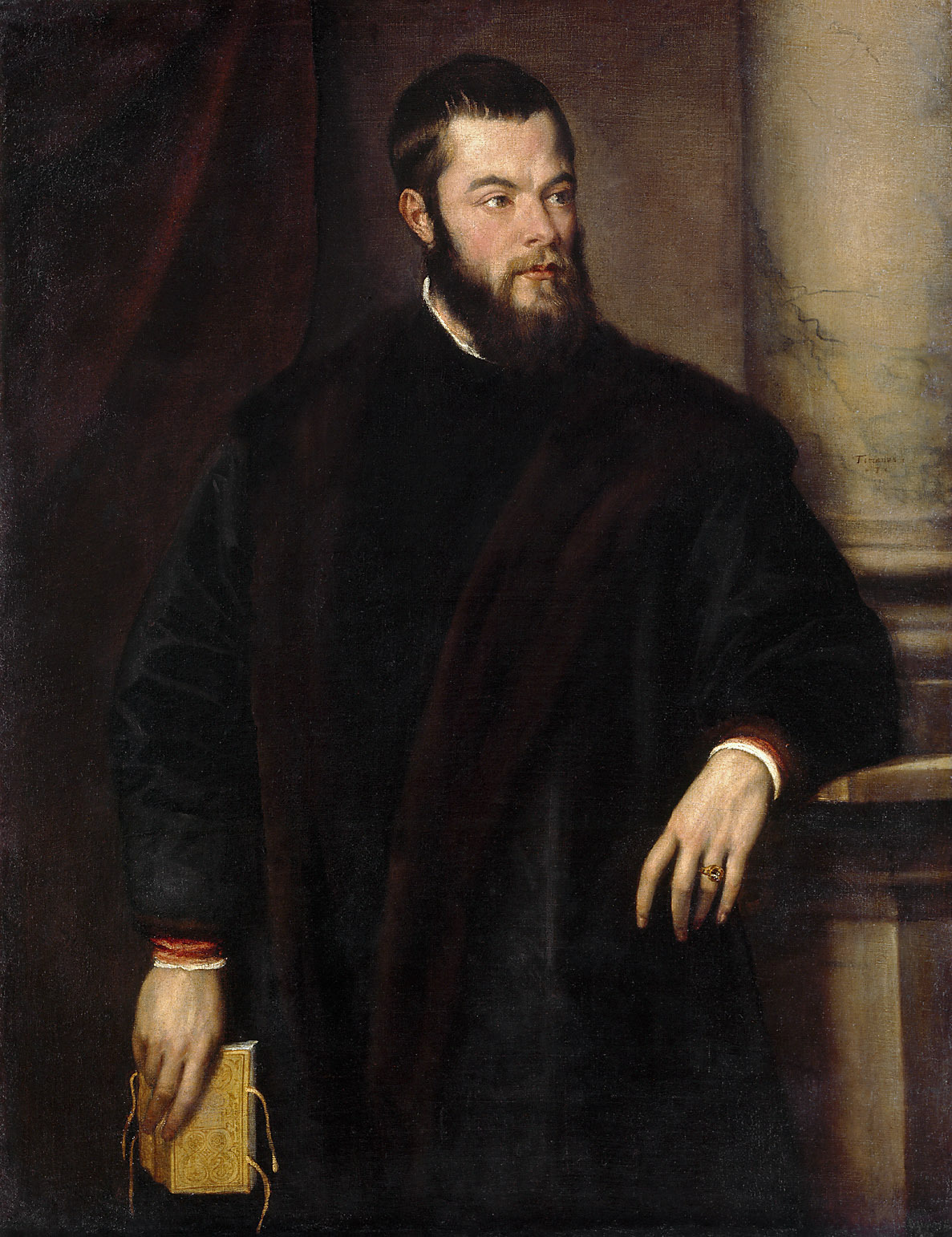
Benedetto Varchi, by Titian

Benedetto Varchi (Italian pronunciation: [beneˈdetto ˈvarki]; 1502/1503 – 1565) was an Italian humanist, historian, and poet.

== Biography ==
Born in Florence to a family that had originated at Montevarchi, he frequented the neoplatonic academy that Bernardo Rucellai organized in his garden, the Orti Oricellari; there, in spite of the fact that Rucellai was married to the elder sister of Lorenzo de' Medici, republican ideals circulated, in the context of revived classical culture, that culminated in a plot in 1513 to subvert Medici rule in Florence. At Pisa, Varchi studied to become a notary.

With his return to Florence, he fought in the defence of the temporarily revived Republic of Florence, during the siege by the Mediceans and imperialists in 1530, and was exiled after the surrender of the city; he spent time at Padua (1537), where he was a protégé of the émigré Piero Strozzi and at Bologna (1540). In 1536 he took part in Strozzi's unsuccessful expedition against Medicean rule, but seven years later Varchi was called back to Florence by Cosimo I, who gave him a pension and appointed him one of the three official historians of Florence along with Giovanni Battista Adriani and Scipione Ammirato. His Storia fiorentina (16 vol.) covers the period from 1527 to 1538, though it was so frank it was not published in Florence until 1721. Varchi also wrote a number of plays, poems, dialogues, and translations from the classics.

With his return to Medici patronage, he became a member of the Accademia fiorentina, occupied with studies of linguistics, literary criticism, esthetics, and philosophy, but also, as became a Renaissance humanist in botany and alchemy. His tract L'Hercolano, in the form of a dialogue between the writer and a conte Ercolano, discussed the Tuscan dialect as it was spoken at Florence, in the vulgar rather than in Latin, an innovation in works of linguistics; it was published posthumously, in 1570. He wrote a comedy La Suocera ("The Mother-in-Law").

Towards the end of his life, he had a spiritual crisis and took holy orders.

In Ezra Pound's The Cantos, Varchi is mentioned with approbation (Canto V) for his honesty as a historian who did not try to fill in gaps in a historical record just to make that record neat. Rather, he was willing to admit that he did not know or that the motives or the events surrounding a particular incident could not be absolutely determined. Pound gives as an example of Varchi's honesty his investigation—for his history of Florence—of the murder of Alessandro de' Medici. Varchi admitted that after all his attempts to uncover the facts he could not decide on the motives of Alessandro's murderer (Lorenzino de' Medici, Alessandro's cousin).

== Homosexuality ==
In his time, Varchi was notorious for his many sonnets to young boys. Though his loves were not always reciprocated, and despite his denunciations of men who engaged in "filthy loves", he was criticized by his contemporaries for his attachments to young boys. One critic mocked him in a satire: "O father Varchi, new Socrates ... his arms open and his trousers down, this is how your Bembo is waiting for you in the Elysian Fields". Another comments on his legacy, "But since he was always inclined to boy love ... he greatly lessened the reputation that would have been rightfully appropriate." In 1545, Varchi was arrested and tried for pederasty, and was eventually pardoned by Cosimo de' Medici upon the intercession of his many friends.

== Further reading (Italian) ==
- Due lezioni
- Il discorso della bellezza e della grazia
- Rime
