= Sideboard (Edward William Godwin) =

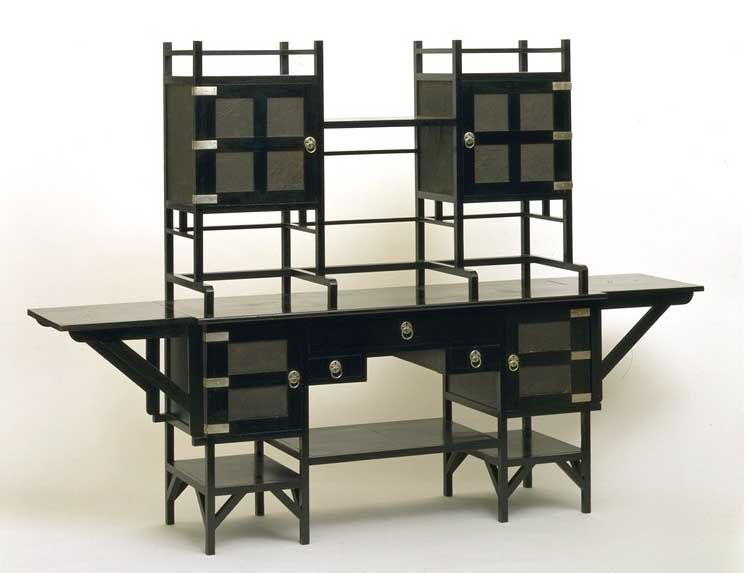
Sideboard, 1867–1870, by Edward William Godwin (Victoria & Albert Museum)

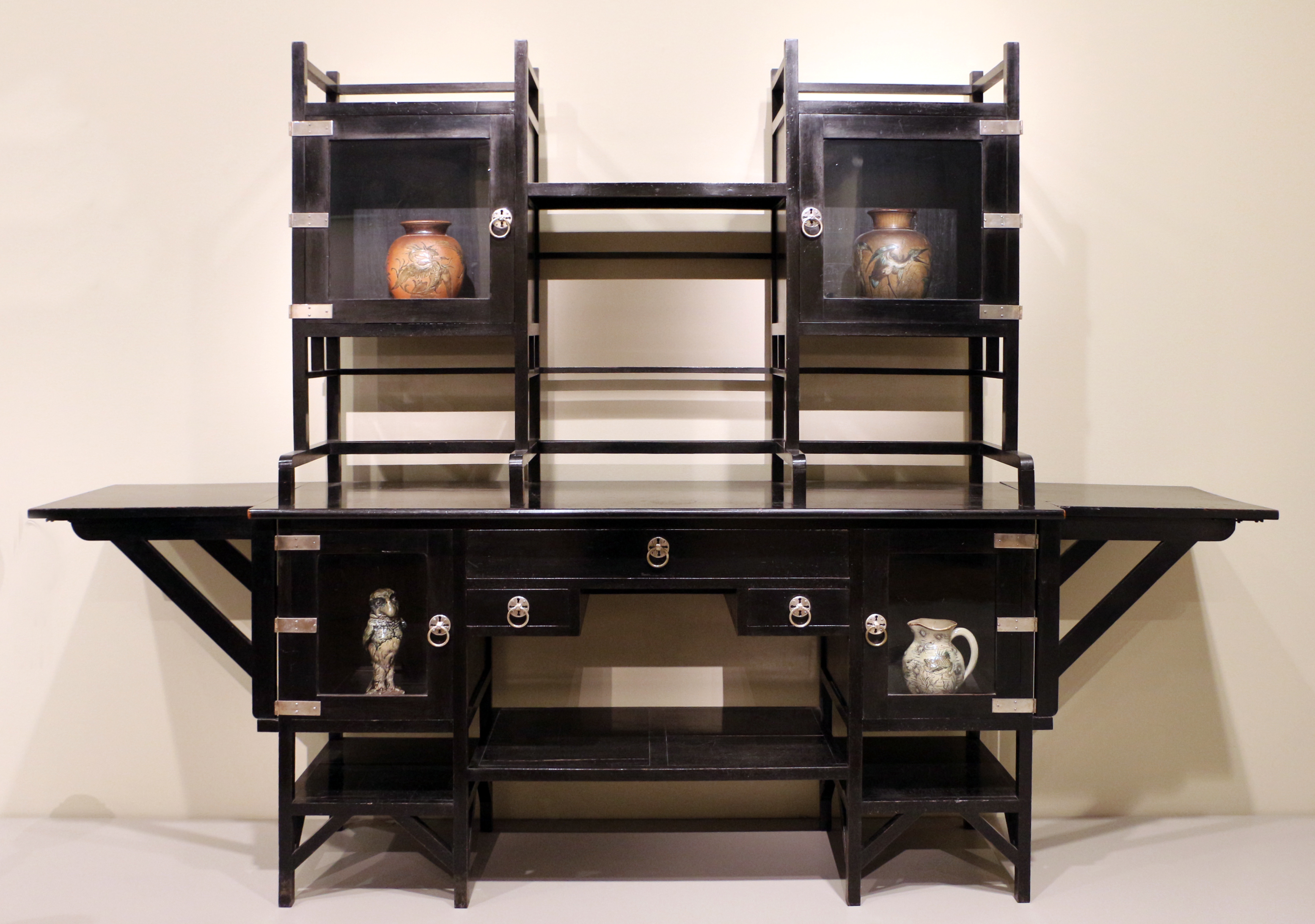
Sideboard at the Art Institute of Chicago

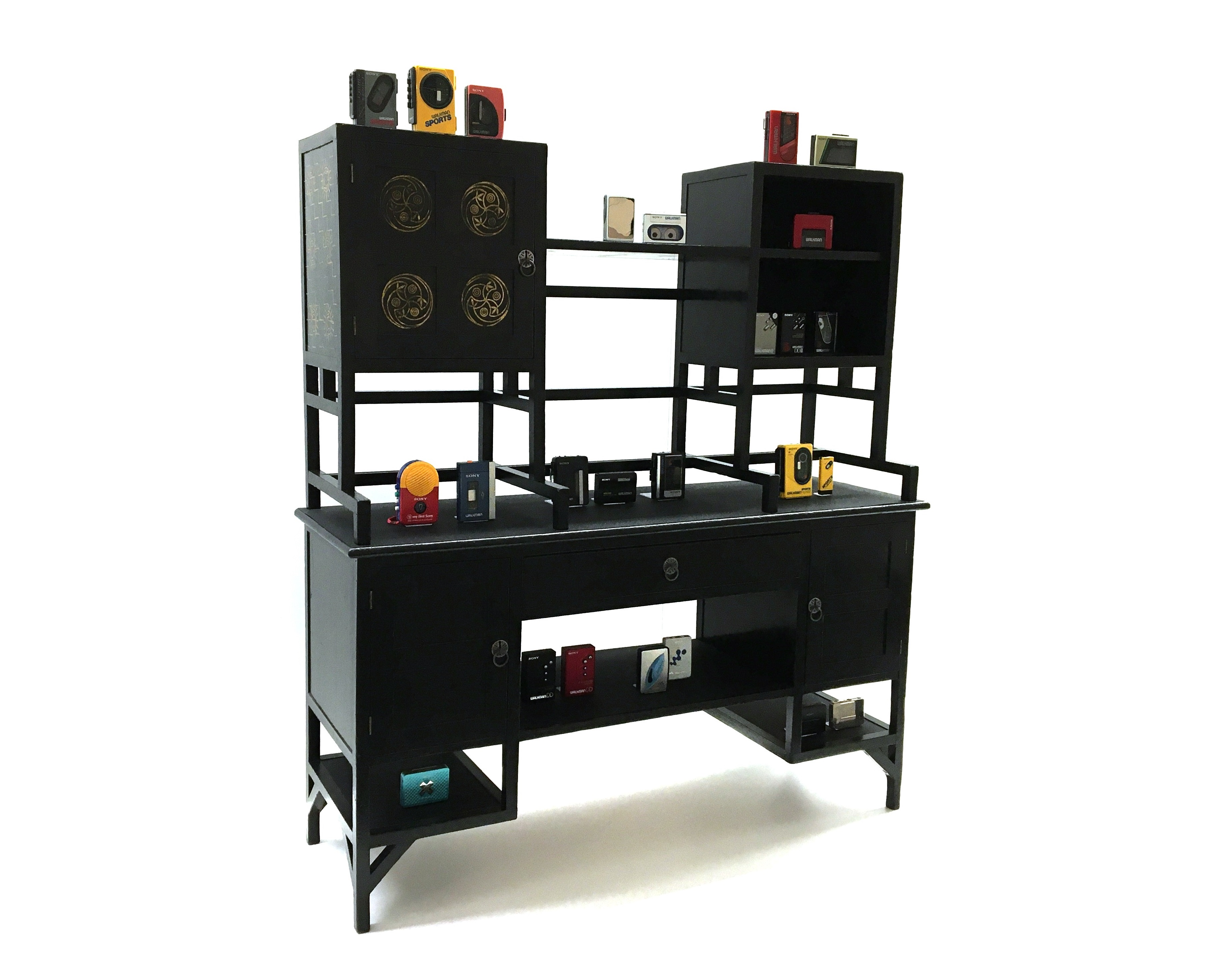
Sideboard at the Pinakothek der Moderne

This sideboard was designed by Edward William Godwin (1833–1886), who was one of the most important exponents of Victorian Japonisme or Anglo-Japanese style, the appropriation of Japanese artistic styles.

Japan began trading with the West in the 1850s, and by the next decade imported Japanese ukiyo-e prints, Japanese ceramics and textiles were very fashionable in Britain. Godwin was influenced by interiors depicted in Japanese prints and by the studies he made of Japanese architecture, but he did not seek to imitate Japanese designs. Instead his Anglo-Japanese furniture aimed to combine the more general principles of simplicity and elegance he admired in the art of Japan with domestic needs of the Victorian home.

The sideboard is stylish and dramatic, but it is also quite appropriate for use in a dining room. It is functional with drawers, adjustable shelves, and a rack fitted to take a large dish between the cupboards. The construction and finish are practical and hygienic, with hard surfaces and simple decoration, and the raised bottom shelf gives access for cleaning the floor.

Godwin designed the first version of this sideboard in ebonised deal, a cheap wood, in 1867. He subsequently changed to ebonised mahogany, as he found deal to be unstable. At least ten versions of the original were made between 1867 and 1888, with differences in design, in decoration or in the number of legs. There are several surviving examples of this sideboard, made of ebonised deal, mahogany, or oak and pine. The original sideboard was designed by Godwin for the dining room of his London home in 1867.

Ten extant examples of the sideboard are known. As of 2012 seven of these examples are in the permanent collections of the Bristol Museums and Art Gallery, Bristol; Die Neue Sammlung, Staatlisches Museum für Angewandte Kunst, Munich; Victoria and Albert Museum, London; The National Trust, Wightwick Manor, Wolverhampton; The Florida International University, Miami Beach; National Gallery of Victoria, Melbourne; and the Powerhouse Museum, Sydney. One was gifted to the Art Institute of Chicago. Two other examples remain in private collections. One was auctioned by Phillips in 2012 for a price of $482,500.

== Bibliography ==
- Hayes, Richard W. (2017). 'The Aesthetic Interior as Incubator of Health and Well-Being'. Architectural History. 60: 277–301. doi:10.1017/arh.2017.9. ISSN 0066-622X.
- Jackson, Anna, ed. (2001). V&A: A Hundred Highlights. V&A Publications. ISBN 1-85177-365-7
- William Watt, Art Furniture from Designs by E.W. Godwin, London, 1877, pl. 6
- Paul Reeves, ‘The Anglo-Japanese Buffet by E W Godwin, Variations on and Developments of a Design’, The Decorative Arts Society 1850 to the Present, London, no. 18, 1994, 36-40
- Susan Weber Soros, ed., E.W. Godwin: Aesthetic Movement Architect and Designer, exh. cat., The Bard Graduate Center for Studies in the Decoratives Arts, New York, 1999, pp. 239, 241
- Susan Weber Soros, The Secular Furniture of E.W. Godwin with Catalogue Raisonné, pp. 176–83
- 'The Best Of British, Design From The 19th And 20th Centuries, The Selling Exhibition', Sotheby’s and Paul Reeves, London, 2008, illustrated pp. 46–49
