= Donato Acquaviva d'Aragona =

Most Reverend Donato Acquaviva d'Aragona
- Bishop of Conversano
- Church: Catholic Church
- Diocese: Diocese of Conversano
- In office: 1499–1528
- Predecessor: Vincenzo Pistacchio
- Successor: Antonio Sanseverino

Personal details
- Died: 1528 Conversano, Italy

Donato Acquaviva d'Aragona (died 1528) was a Roman Catholic prelate who served as Bishop of Conversano (1499–1528).

== Biography ==
In 1499, Donato Acquaviva d'Aragona was appointed during the papacy of Pope Alexander VI as Bishop of Conversano. He served as Bishop of Conversano until his death in 1528.

== External links and additional sources ==
- Cheney, David M. "Diocese of Conversano-Monopoli". Catholic-Hierarchy.org. (for Chronology of Bishops) ^{[self-published]}
- Chow, Gabriel. "Diocese of Conversano-Monopoli (Italy)". GCatholic.org. (for Chronology of Bishops) ^{[self-published]}

Catholic Church titles
| Preceded by Vincenzo Pistacchio | Bishop of Conversano; 1499–1528 | Succeeded by Antonio Sanseverino |
