= Sulpicio Acquaviva d'Aragona =

15th-century bishop of Conversano, Italy

Most Reverend Sulpicio Acquaviva d'Aragona
- Bishop of Conversano
- Church: Catholic Church
- Diocese: Diocese of Conversano
- In office: 1483–1494
- Predecessor: Paolo de Torcoli
- Successor: Vincenzo Pistacchio
- Previous post: Bishop of Bitetto (1482-1483)

Personal details
- Died: 1494 Conversano, Italy

Sulpicio Acquaviva d'Aragona (died 1494) was a Roman Catholic prelate who served as Bishop of Conversano (1483–1494), and Bishop of Bitetto (1482–1483).

== Biography ==
On 26 Apr 1482, Sulpicio Acquaviva d'Aragona was appointed by Pope Sixtus IV as Bishop of Bitetto. On 17 Feb 1483, he was appointed by Pope Sixtus IV as Bishop of Conversano. He served as Bishop of Conversano until his death in 1494.

== See also ==
- Catholic Church in Italy

== External links and additional sources ==
- Cheney, David M. "Diocese of Conversano-Monopoli". Catholic-Hierarchy.org. (for Chronology of Bishops) ^{[self-published]}
- Chow, Gabriel. "Diocese of Conversano-Monopoli (Italy)". GCatholic.org. (for Chronology of Bishops) ^{[self-published]}

Catholic Church titles
Preceded by Leonardo del Giudice	Bishop of Bitetto; 1482–1483	Succeeded by Vincenzo Pistacchio
Preceded by Paolo de Torcoli	Bishop of Conversano; 1483–1494	Succeeded by Vincenzo Pistacchio
