= Monopoli Cathedral =

Latin Catholic cathedral in Monopoli, Apulia, Italy

Coordinates: 40.9510°N 17.3033°E

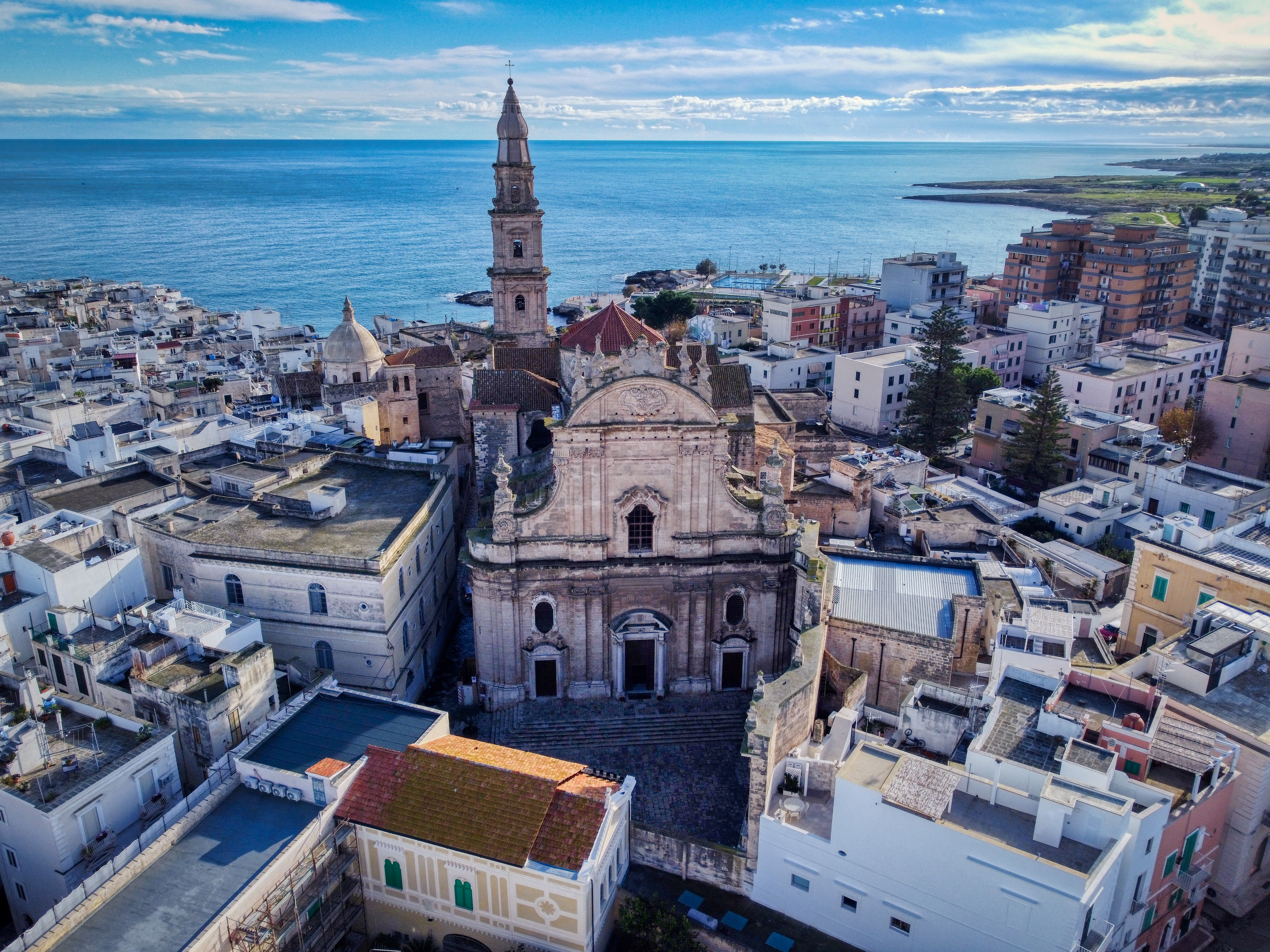
Monopoli Cathedral, the Basilica of the Madonna della Madia

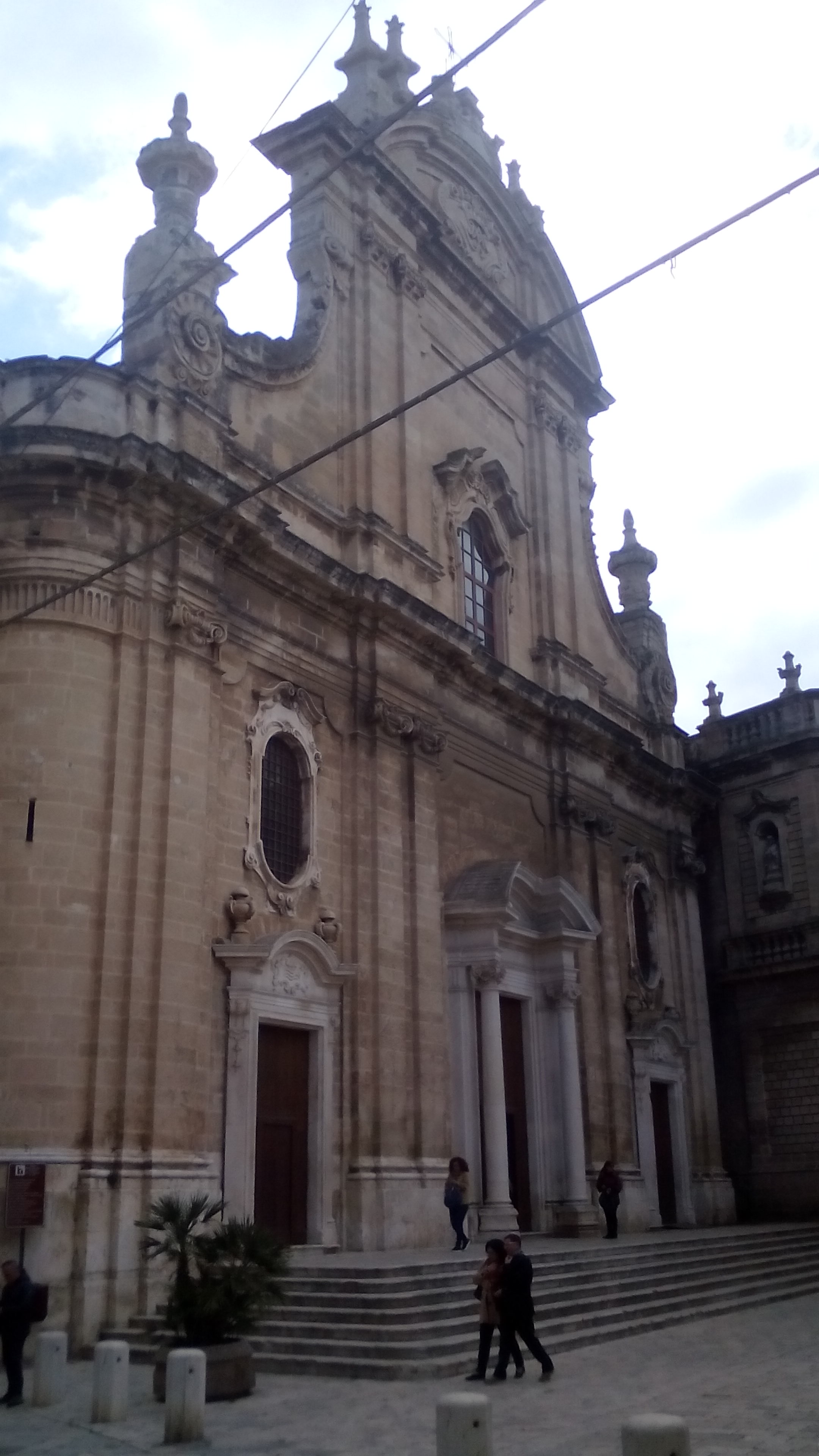
Main entrance

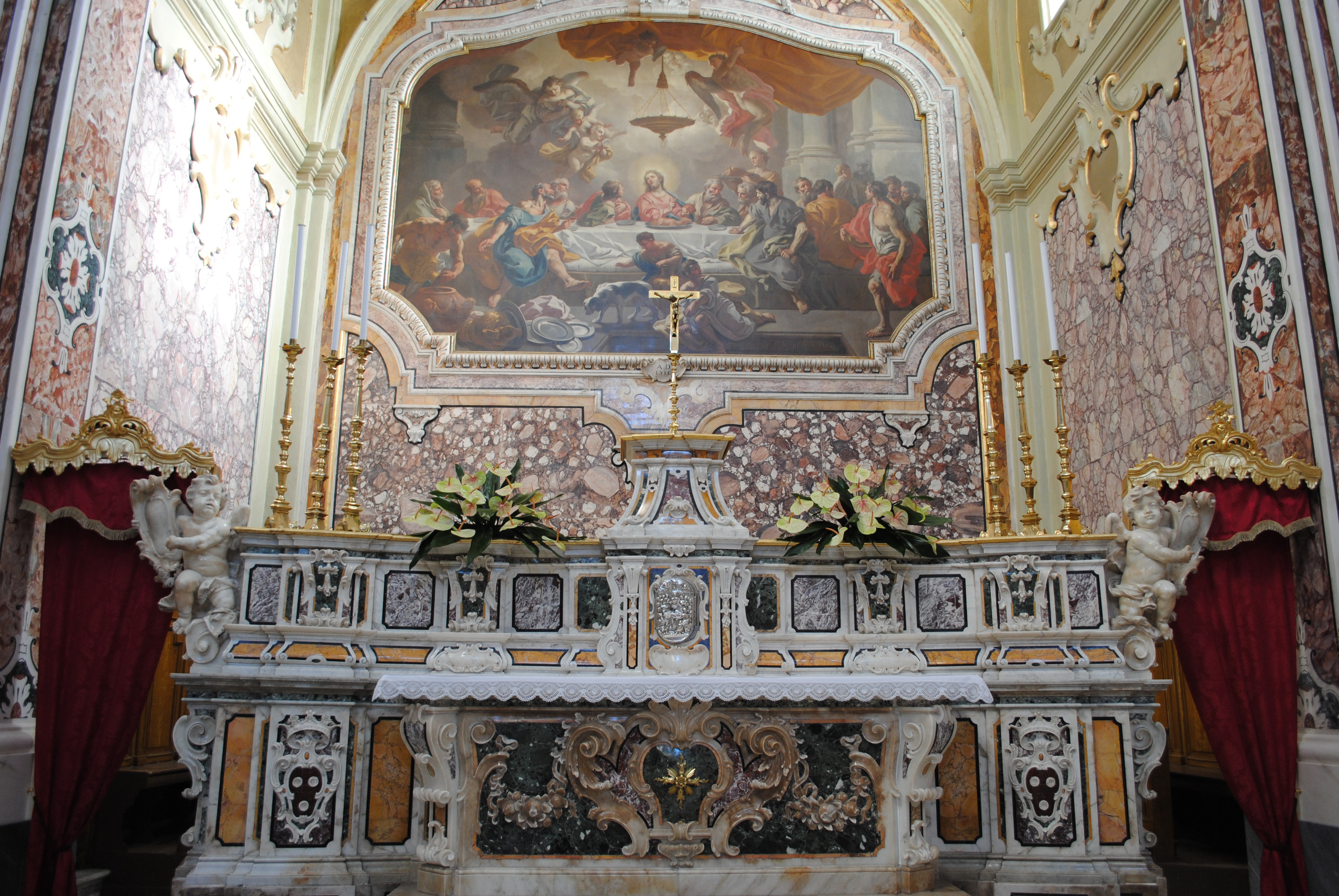
The chapel of the Most Holy Sacrament

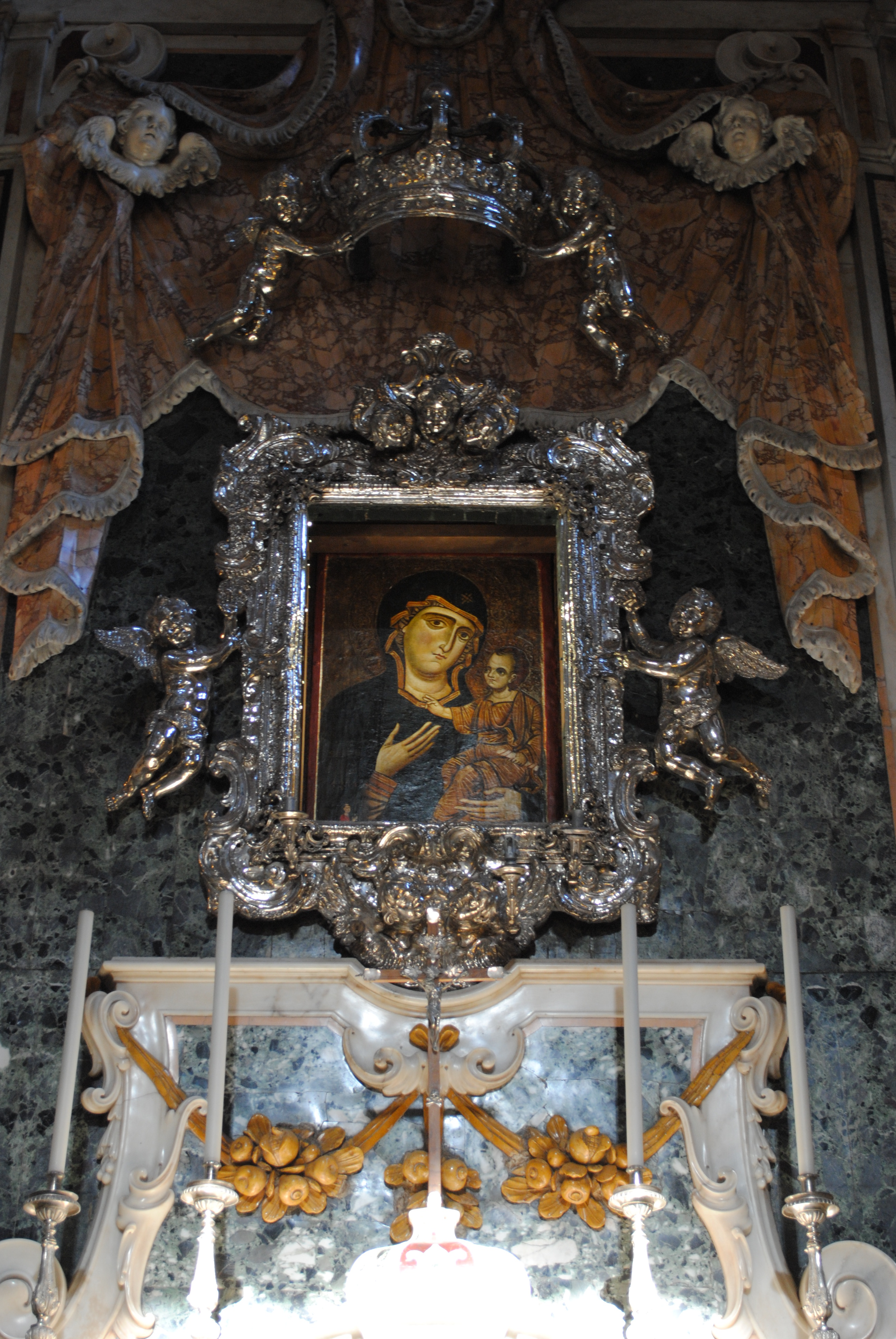
The altar of S. Maria della Madia

Monopoli Cathedral, otherwise the Basilica of the Madonna della Madia or Santa Maria della Madia (Italian: Duomo di Monopoli; Basilica Concattedrale di Maria Santissima della Madia) is a Latin Catholic cathedral in the town of Monopoli, in the province of Bari, region of Apulia, Italy. It is dedicated to the Virgin Mary under the title of the Madonna della Madia, after an icon kept here. Formerly the episcopal seat of the Diocese of Monopoli, it has been since 1986 a co-cathedral in the Diocese of Conversano-Monopoli.

The cathedral was granted the status of a minor basilica in 1921.

== History ==
The cathedral was erected near the site of a Roman temple and burial site. Work began on it in 1107, but was supposedly halted for the lack of roof beams. A miracle occurred in 1117 when a raft carrying an icon of the Madonna drifted into the harbour. The raft beams were used to construct the roof.

The Romanesque structure was not complete until 1442, when it was consecrated. Two of the three bell-towers were damaged during the siege of the Marquis Del Vasto in 1528. The remaining tower collapsed in 1686, killing forty townspeople. By 1693, a new campanile had been erected.

In 1738, an endowment by Bishop Giulio Sacchi called for a refurbishment. The old church was razed, and a new church begun in 1742. Work was completed in Baroque style in 1772.

In 1921, the cathedral was declared a minor basilica. In 1986, the dioceses of Monopoli and Conversano were joined, making this a co-cathedral.

On 1770, the icon of Our Lady of Madia was Crowned with a decree from Pope Clement XIII

The Chapel of Our Lady of Madia has elaborate polychrome decoration on the altar. The chapel contains two large canvases by Pietro Bardellino, and there are 6 small 18th-century paintings depicting the Life of the Virgin by Michele del Pezzo. A series of four paintings (1732) in the Chapel of the Martyrs by Michelangelo Signorile recounts the Miracle of the Raft.
