= Lorenzino de' Medici =

Italian politician and writer

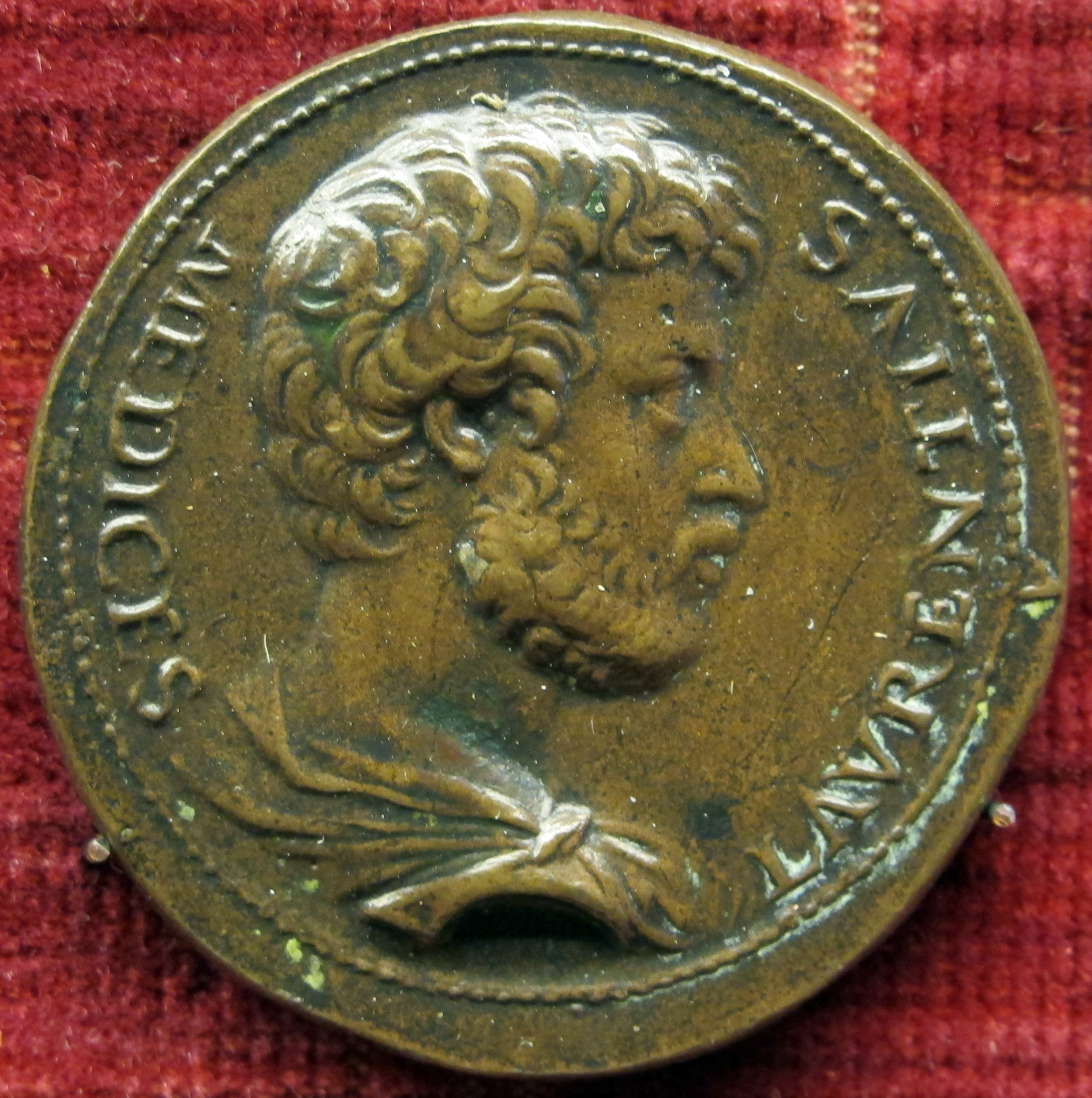
- Lorenzino on a contemporary Florentine medal
- Born: 23 March 1514; Florence, Republic of Florence
- Died: 26 February 1548 (aged 33); Venice, Republic of Venice
- Noble family: Medici
- Issue: Lorenzina de' Medici (ill.)
- Father: Pierfrancesco II de' Medici
- Mother: Maria Soderini

Lorenzino de' Medici (22 March 1514 – 26 February 1548), also known as Lorenzaccio, was an Italian politician, writer, and dramatist, and a member of the Medici family. He became famous for assassinating his cousin, Alessandro de' Medici, Duke of Florence in 1537. He was in turn murdered in 1548 in retaliation for his deed.

== Biography ==
=== Childhood and youth ===
Son of Pierfrancesco and Maria Soderini, Lorenzino lost his father when he was only eleven (1525). He was then raised by his mother at the Villa del Trebbio along with his younger brother Giuliano and his two sisters Laudomia and Maddalena. In 1526 his mother decided to move to Venice with Giuliano and the future Cosimo I de' Medici to escape the arrival of the Landsknechts. Their departure was timely because, only one year later, the Sack of Rome enormously weakened Pope Clement VII (formerly known as Giulio di Giuliano de' Medici) and as a consequence, the Medici were expelled from Florence.

In 1530 Lorenzino moved to Rome, where in 1534 he mutilated the heads of some of the ancient statues of the Arch of Constantine. Only the intercession of his cousin Cardinal Ippolito saved Lorenzino from the anger of the Pope, who had promised to condemn the vandal to death. Nevertheless, after this virtually inexplicable action, Lorenzino was disgracefully expelled from Rome.

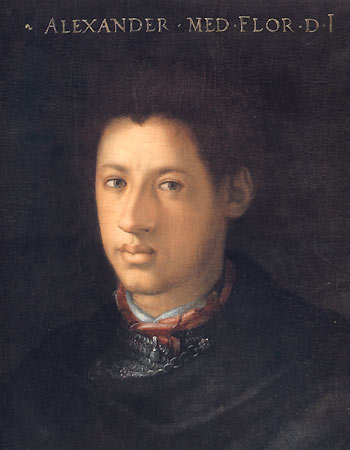
Duke Alessandro

=== Relationship with Alessandro de' Medici ===
After leaving Rome, Lorenzino returned to Florence, where he soon established a close relationship with his cousin Alessandro, who had become lord of Florence in 1530 and duke in 1532. The two were partners in riotous escapades, but the authenticity of their friendship is doubtful and their relationship had more than one dark side. In 1536, the duke sided against Lorenzino in a legal controversy on the inheritance of Pierfrancesco the Elder, Lorenzino's great-grandfather, which caused substantial financial damage to Lorenzino. In the same year, Alessandro married Margaret of Parma, the natural daughter of the Emperor Charles V.

=== Assassination of Alessandro ===
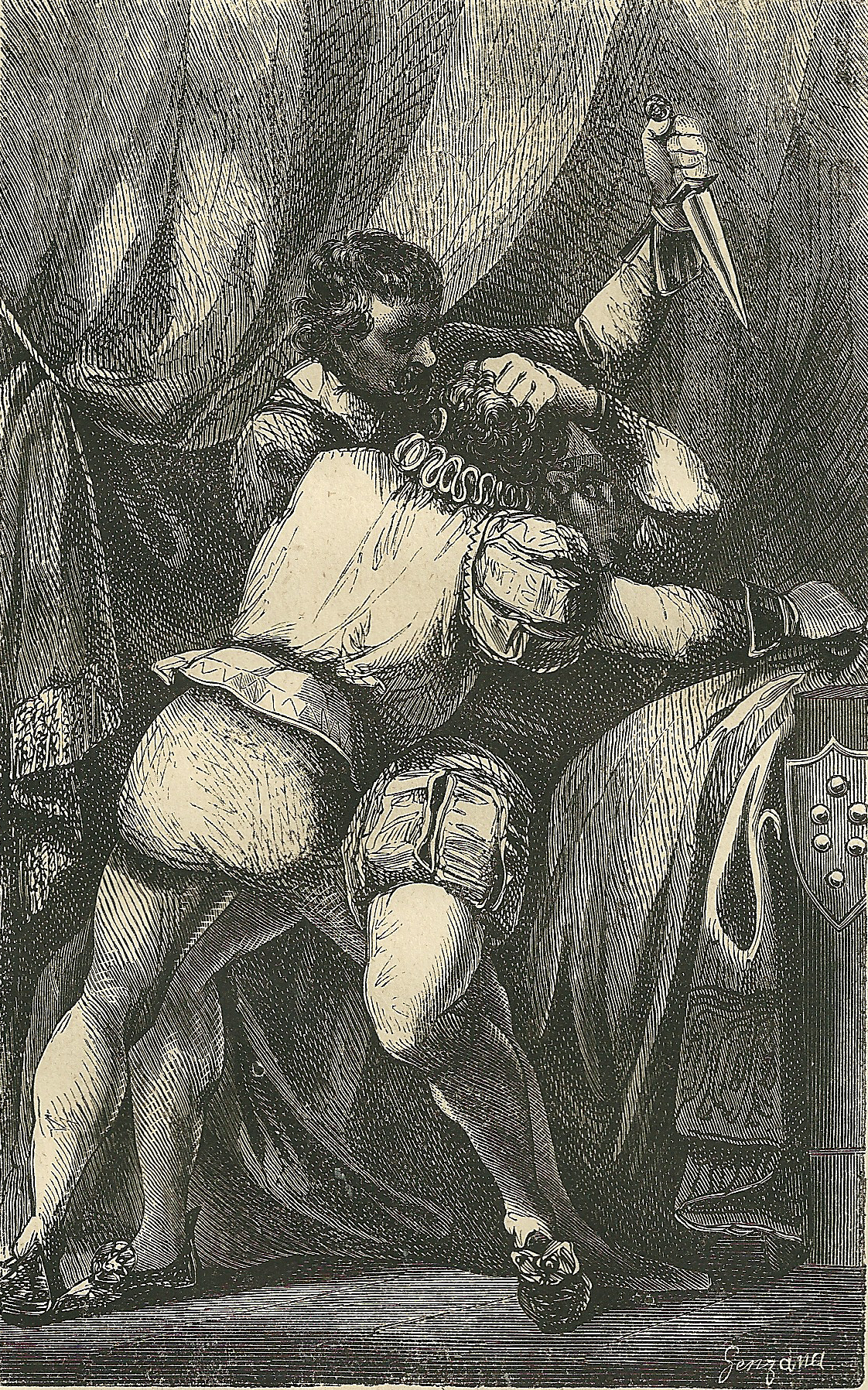
The assassination of Duke Alessandro

On the evening of 6 January 1537, Lorenzino lured Alessandro to his apartments with the promise of a night of passion, and left him alone pretending that he was going to fetch a woman who had already agreed to meet him. According to most historians, the woman was Caterina Soderini, wife of Leonardo Ginori, but others think it was Laudomia, Lorenzino's sister. In the meantime, Alessandro fell asleep and, having previously sent away his men, he was completely defenceless when Lorenzino came back with his servant Piero di Giovannabate, also known as Scoronconcolo. The two men assaulted the duke with swords and daggers, and Alessandro was killed even though he reacted ferociously and fought with all his might.

Many hypotheses have been proposed to explain the reasons for the murder, from the personal resentment caused by jealousy or patrimonial reasons, to Lorenzino's desire to make a sensational gesture to immortalize his glory.

Lorenzino himself, however, stated in his famous Apology - written only a few days after his crime - that he acted for political reasons; he killed the duke to free Florence from the man that many considered to be a tyrant. The Florentine republican exiles generally had the same explanation; they considered Lorenzino a hero, since in so doing he could have made the reintroduction of the republic possible. Dominant figures in the republican exiles, such as Benedetto Varchi, even compared Lorenzino's cause and actions to Brutus, the killer of Julius Caesar who held the same republican ideal.

=== Exile ===
After the murder, Lorenzino took the horses he had previously prepared and left Florence along with Piero and another servant. He first arrived in Bologna, where the jurist Silvestro Aldobrandini, another republican exile, did not believe him. Then Lorenzino continued his journey until he reached Venice, where he was welcomed with open arms by the very rich banker Filippo Strozzi, the leader of the exiles, who promised him that he would marry his sons Piero and Roberto to Lorenzino's sisters Laudomia and Maddalena de' Medici. Among the many other exiles that exulted over the duke's death were the famous men of letters Iacopo Nardi and Benedetto Varchi: the latter said that Lorenzino was greater than Brutus. Also the poet Luigi Alamanni praised Lorenzino from France, whereas the sculptor Jacopo Sansovino promised to dedicate a statue to him.

With Alessandro's death, the main branch of the Medici family was extinguished. The lack of a suitable lineal descendant created the conditions for the rise to power of the seventeen-year-old Cosimo, a member of the cadet branch of the family who was chosen as the new duke with the approval of the Emperor Charles V.

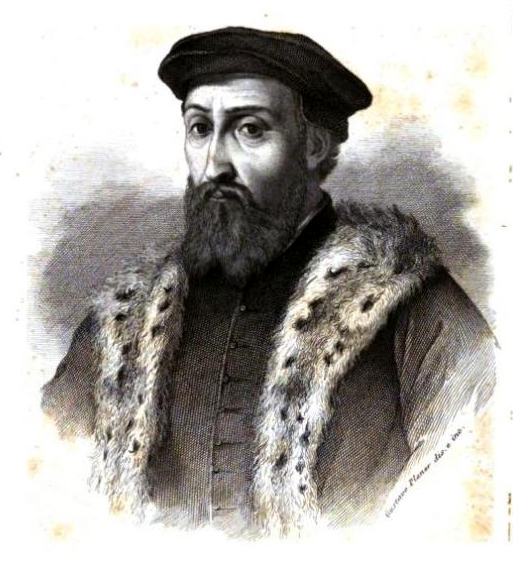
Filippo Strozzi

After a few days in Venice, Lorenzino decided to go to Mirandola, where he was hosted by Count Galeotto Pico and remained for around two weeks. He then returned to Venice and from there, on 16 February 1537, he left to go to Constantinople, with the Ottoman ambassador in Venice and Giorgio Gritti, son of Doge Andrea Gritti. The choice to leave Italy was due partly to the risk of being killed and partly to a diplomatic mission to the Ottoman Sultan Suleiman the Magnificent on behalf of the King of France. A few months later, the Battle of Montemurlo, won by Cosimo's army, ended the hopes of the exiles. Lorenzino's patron Strozzi was taken prisoner. He died in 1538 (suicide, according to the official version) after being tortured in the attempt to establish an unlikely connection between him and the Duke's assassination.

In September 1537 Lorenzino went to France, to the court of Francis I of France, where he could count on the political support of the king and on the hospitality of many Florentines, especially his maternal uncle, the bishop of Saintes Giuliano Soderini, and the royal treasurer Giuliano Bonaccorsi. Contrary to what was previously believed, in this period Lorenzino went often to Italy and carried out important political-diplomatic missions on behalf of Francis I. Most importantly, he was in Italy from February to July 1542 to act as a go-between for the king and the Florentine exiles in Venice, with the aim of organizing a military venture against Cosimo.

=== Death ===
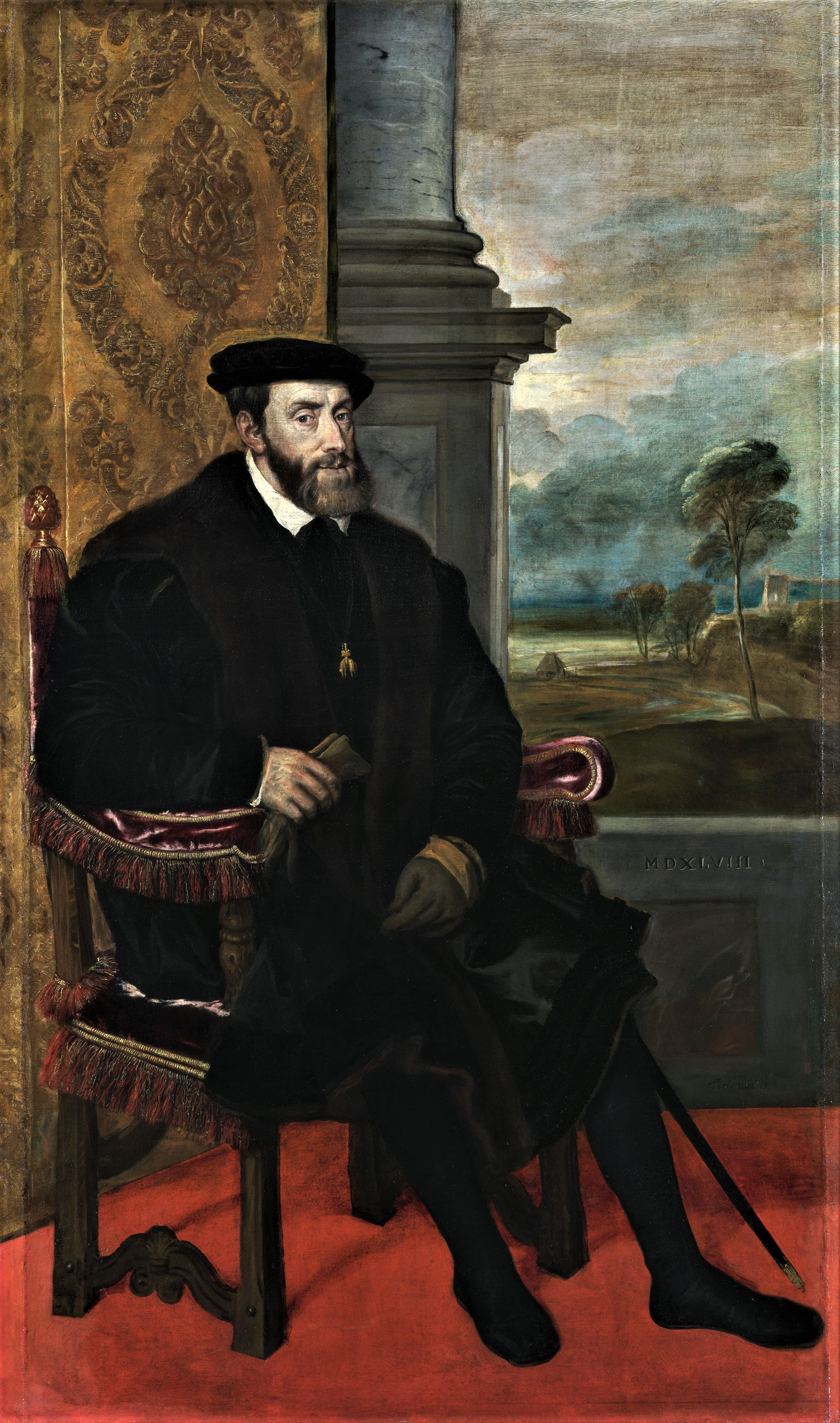
Titian, Charles V in Augsburg in 1548 Alte Pinakothek, Munich.

In 1544 Lorenzino returned for good to Venice, where he was in close contact with the other Florentine exiles and established a friendship with the papal legate Giovanni Della Casa. In Venice, a nest of imperial and Medici spies, Lorenzino was much more vulnerable than in France, and the attempts to kill him and revenge the death of Duke Alessandro multiplied. The situation got even more complicated when, between the end of 1547 and the beginning of 1548, almost all the Florentines left Venice and moved to France, thus leaving Lorenzino isolated. Consequently, on 26 February 1548, Lorenzino was murdered in Venice by two assassins. One of them, Francesco da Bibbona, left a detailed account of the deed which includes extensive information on the execution of the murder.

For several centuries, it has been believed that the Medici secretary Giovanni Francesco Lottini had organized the murder, but new research has demonstrated that he played no part in it. Moreover, both his contemporaries and historians of the following centuries have always believed that Lorenzino's assassination had been ordered by Duke Cosimo I, as revenge for the murder of his predecessor. On the contrary, a study by Stefano Dall’Aglio has shown that the entire operation was orchestrated by the Emperor Charles V, who could not forgive the death of his son-in-law, the husband of his daughter Margaret. It was Charles V who explicitly ordered the murder, writing from Augsburg unbeknownst to Cosimo, and gave detailed instructions to his ambassador in Venice, Juan Hurtado de Mendoza, who was in charge of the operation.

== Issue ==
Lorenzino had one illegitimate daughter by Elena Barozzi:

- Lorenzina de' Medici (1547/1548 - 1590). She was born after her father's death and was raised by his relatives. She married Giulio Colonna, but the marriage was childless.

== Works ==
Lorenzino was also a writer. In his Apology he defended himself, explaining that he had committed the murder for the love of liberty: he had followed the example of Brutus – one of the assassins of Julius Caesar – and had murdered the duke after pretending he was his faithful servant and friend. The Apology is considered one of the loftiest examples of Renaissance eloquence and a masterpiece of anti-tyrannical thought. It was written in two subsequent versions, the first of which, not very different from the definitive one, dates back to January 1537, a few days after the murder.

He also authored a play entitled Aridosia, written around 1535 and successfully presented in Florence, first at the Spedale dei Tessitori and later at Palazzo Medici.

== Cultural depiction ==
Lorenzino's assassination of Alessandro, as well as his republicanism and anti-tyrannical spirit, inspired French playwright Alfred de Musset to write the play Lorenzaccio.

== Bibliography ==
- Dall'Aglio, Stefano. "Solving a Renaissance Murder Mystery." History Today (Feb 2020) 70#2 pp 38–49.
- Dall'Aglio, Stefano, The Duke's Assassin. Exile and Death of Lorenzino de' Medici (New Haven and London: Yale University Press, 2015), ISBN 978-0-3001-8978-0.
- Parks, Tim (7 March 2019) [1539]. Foreword. Apology for a Murder. By Lorenzino de' Medici. Translated by Brown, Andrew (revised ed.). Alma Books. ISBN 978-0-7145-4947-7.

=== Other languages ===
- Bredekamp, Horst, 'Lorenzinos de’ Medici Angriff auf den Konstantinsbogen als Schlacht von Cannae', in L’art et les révolutions (Strasbourg: Societè Alsacienne pour le Développement de l’Histoire de l’Art, 1992), 4, pp. 95–115.
- Dall'Aglio, Stefano, 'Il presunto colpevole. Giovan Francesco Lottini e l'assassinio di Lorenzino de' Medici', in Rivista Storica Italiana, CXXI (2009), pp. 840–856.
- Dall'Aglio, Stefano, 'Nota sulla redazione e sulla datazione dell' Apologia di Lorenzino de' Medici', in 'Bibliothèque d'Humanisme et Renaissance', LXXI (2009), pp. 233–241.
- Ferrai, Luigi Alberto, 'La giovinezza di Lorenzino de' Medici', in Giornale Storico della Letteratura Italiana, II, 1883, pp. 79–112.
- Ferrai, Luigi Alberto, Lorenzino de' Medici e la società cortigiana del Cinquecento (Milan: Hoepli, 1891).
- Racconto della morte di Lorenzino de' Medici, tratto da una relazione del capitano Francesco Bibbona, che l'uccise, in Cesare Cantù, 'Spigolature negli archivi toscani', in Rivista Contemporanea 20 (1860), pp. 332–345.
