= Sideboard =

Item of dining room furniture

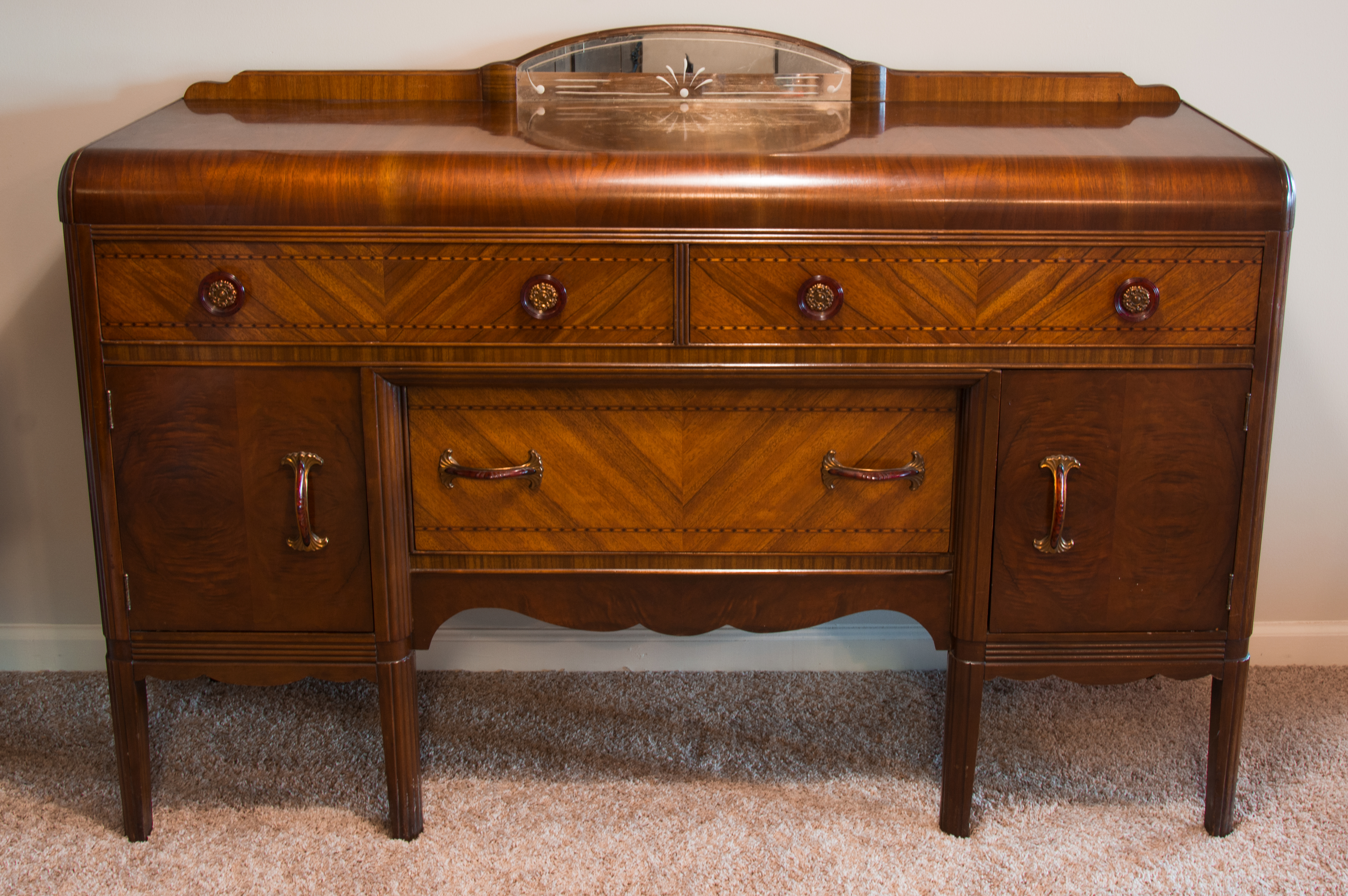
A Waterfall-style sideboard

A sideboard, also called a buffet, is an item of furniture traditionally used in the dining room for serving food, displaying serving dishes, and for storage. It usually consists of a set of cabinets, or cupboards, and one or more drawers, all topped by a wooden surface for conveniently holding food, serving dishes, or lighting devices. The words sideboard and buffet are somewhat interchangeable, but if the item has short legs, or a base that sits directly on the floor with no legs, it is more likely to be called a sideboard; if it has longer legs, it is more likely to be called a buffet.

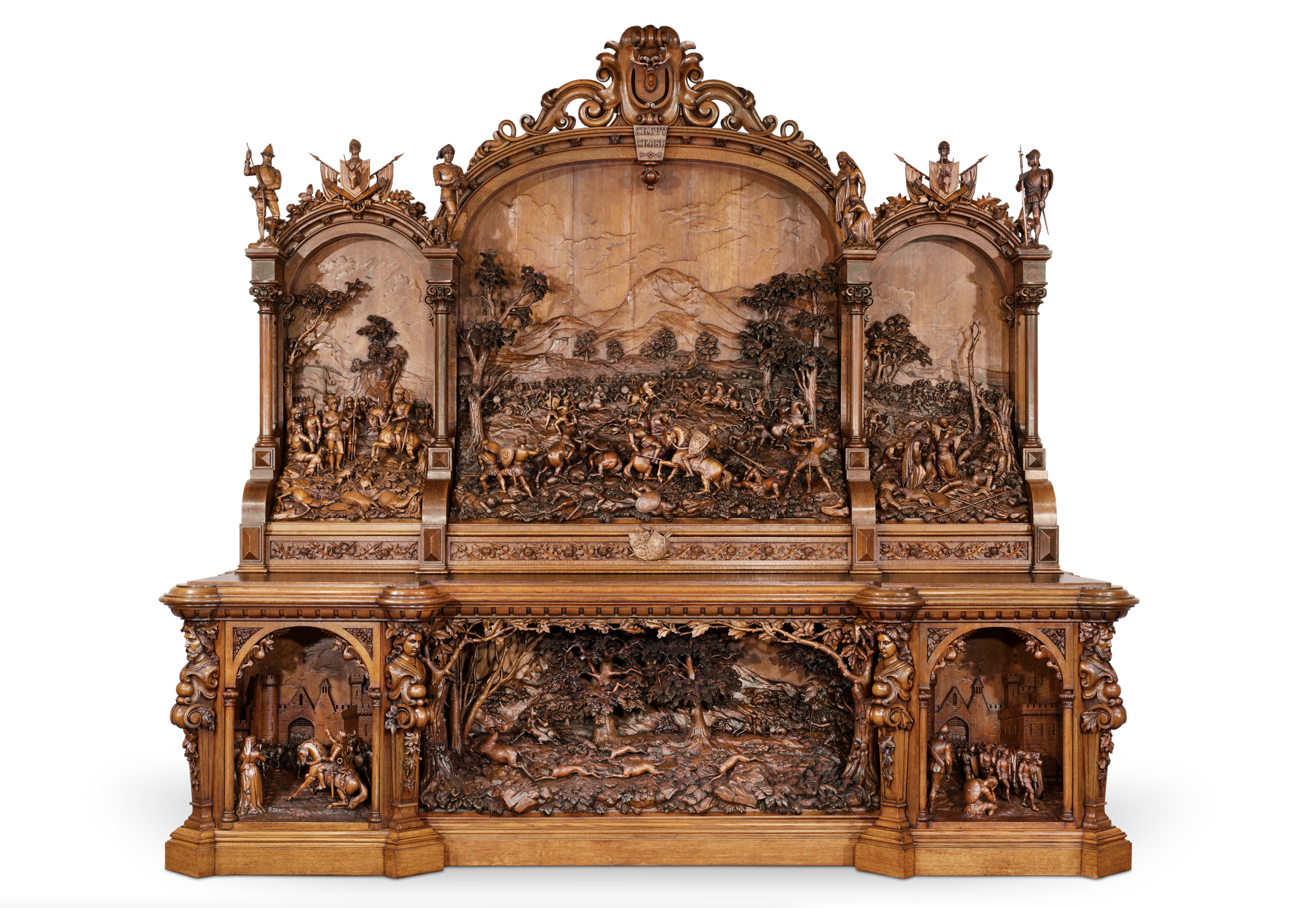
The Chevy Chase Sideboard by Gerrard Robinson (1834–1891).

The earliest versions of the sideboard familiar today made their appearance in the 18th century, but they gained most of their popularity during the 19th century, as households became prosperous enough to dedicate a room solely to dining. Sideboards were made in a range of decorative styles and were frequently ornamented with costly veneers and inlays. In later years, sideboards have been placed in living rooms or other areas where household items might be displayed.

In traditional formal dining rooms today, an antique sideboard is a desirable and fashionable accessory, and finely styled versions from the late 18th or early 19th centuries are the most sought after and most costly. Among its counterparts in modern furniture styles, the form is often referred to as a server. Some of the earliest production of sideboards arose in England, France, Poland, Belgium and Scotland. Later, American designs arose. Characteristic materials used in historic sideboard manufacture include mahogany, oak, pine, and walnut.

== See also ==
- Buffet – a way of serving food, rather than the item of furniture
- Cellarette (liquor cabinet)
- Chiffonier
- China cabinet
- Credenza
- Hutch (furniture)
- Madia (furniture)
- Sideboard (Edward William Godwin)
- Welsh dresser
