= Giovanni Francesco Lottini =

Italian politician

Giovanni Francesco (Giovanfrancesco) Lottini (1512 – August 1572) was an Italian politician and writer. He was secretary to Cosimo I de' Medici. He was often implicated in the assassination of Lorenzio de'Medici, which modern scholars have discredited.

He wrote an anonymous account of the conclave to choose Pope Marcellus II.

== Biography ==
Giovanni Francesco Lottini was born in Volterra in 1512. In 1530, he was accused and put on trial for seriously injuring a man from Volterra. He served as secretary to Cosimo I, but in 1542 he was officially dismissed by Cosimo I himself for acts of sodomy; however, he remained in his service for shady dealings. In February 1548, Cosimo I sent him to Venice, but he was not the one who plotted the conspiracy against Lorenzino de' Medici, who, strangely enough, was assassinated by two assassins from Volterra that very same month.

After being expelled from Florence once again, he moved to Rome, where he became secretary to the Guido Ascanio Sforza di Santa Fiora. On January 31, 1550, during the conclave, Cardinal Niccolò Ridolfi was poisoned, and many blamed Lottini for the crime.

In 1552, he was granted the Abbey of Colle di Piemonte and a canonry by Pope Marcellus II.

In 1555, he entered the papal court, opposing the election of Pope Paul IV, who, deeply resentful, had him imprisoned in Castel Sant'Angelo on August 10.

In 1559, he was serving as secretary to Giovanni Angelo de' Medici, who, upon becoming Pope Pius IV, appointed him Diocese of Conversano-Monopoli in 1560. Lottini, however, declined the position and resumed his wandering life.

Before his death (August 1572), he gave his brother a treatise containing personal reflections and notes on a wide variety of topics—ranging from military affairs to the care of one’s physical well-being, from ways to curb usury to the conduct expected of a prince. The manuscript, titled Avvedimenti Civili, was presented in 1574 by his brother Girolamo to Francesco I de' Medici, Grand Duke of Tuscany.
