= The Sideboard =

- Former editors: Terry Melia; Andy Collins; Monty Ashley; Omeed Dariani; Thomas Pannell; Kate Stavola
- Categories: Magic: The Gathering
- Frequency: Monthly
- First issue: July 1996
- Final issue Number: November 2003; 49
- Company: Wizards of the Coast
- Country: United States
- Language: English

The Sideboard was a magazine published by Wizards of the Coast that covered Magic: The Gathering tournaments and expert play. Publication was ceased after six years, and much of the print and online content from The Sideboard was folded into magicthegathering.com.

Originally titled The Duelist Sideboard, the first issue was a full-color, 32-page issue published in July 1996. The cover story was a preview of the upcoming Magic World Championships. The next six issues were also full-color, and ran through July 1997.

The Duelist Sideboard became a tabloid-size newspaper with its next issue (September 1997) and featured Jakub Slemr, who had just won the 1997 Magic World Championship. Two issues later (issue 10) it dropped the "Duelist", becoming just The Sideboard. It stayed a tabloid through January 2000; the last newspaper-style issue was issue 28, which featured Bob Maher, Jr. after he won at Pro Tour Chicago.

In March 2000, issue 29 brought The Sideboard back to a full-color magazine, which was how it stayed through November 2003; the last issue (issue 49) featured coverage of that year's world championships and its winner, Daniel Zink. In issue 33, it dropped "The" from its name and became just Sideboard.

== Editors of The Sideboard ==
- Terry Melia (issues 1–9)
- Andy Collins (issues 10–14)
- Monty Ashley (issues 15–32)
- Omeed Dariani (issues 33–37)
- Thomas Pannell (issues 38–49)
- Kate Stavola (issue 49)

== See also ==
- The Duelist, a sister publication to The Sideboard which was also produced by Wizards of the Coast
