= Caudle =

Historical hot drink

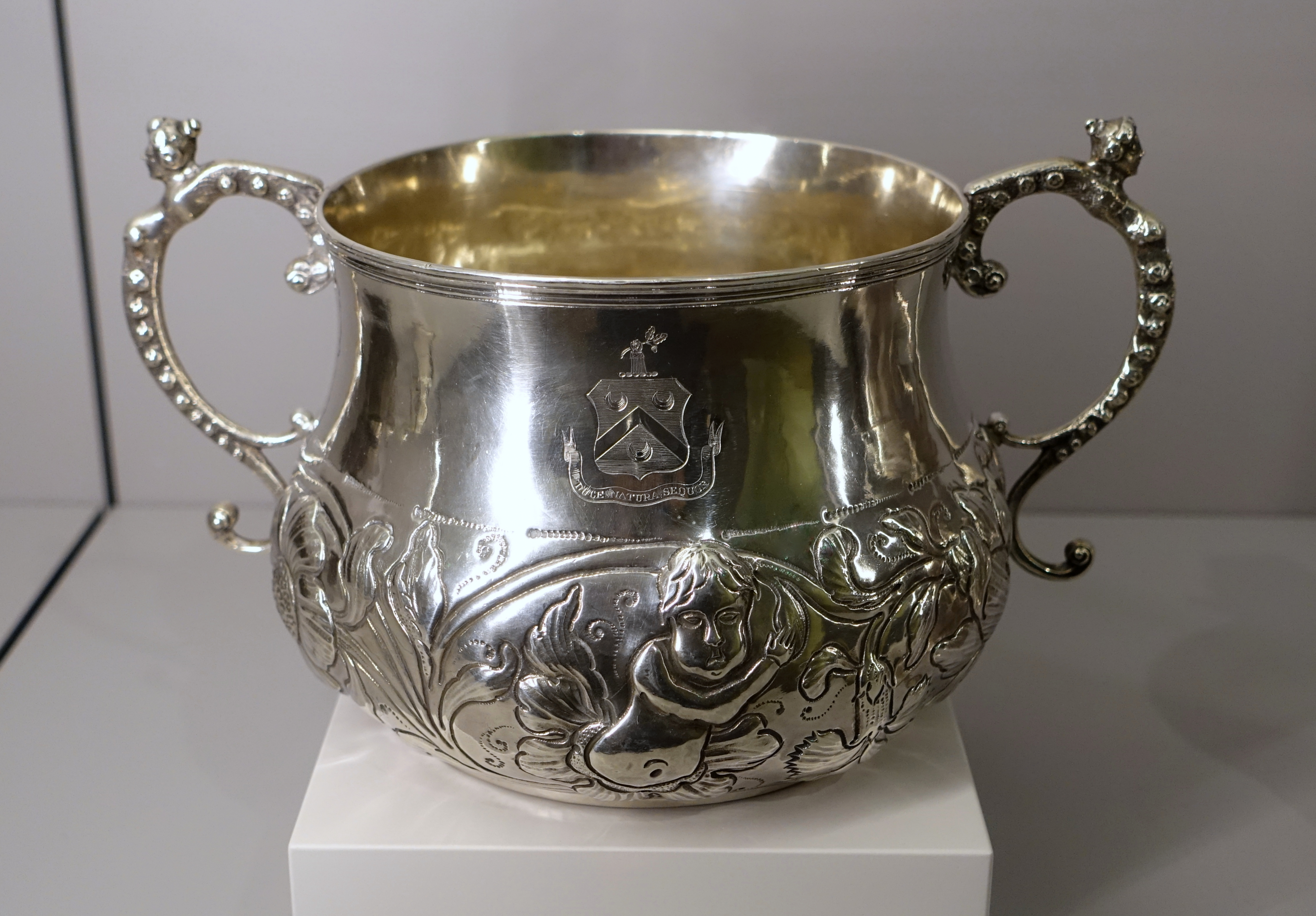
The Holyoke Caudle Cup, silver c. 1690, by John Coney, Fogg Art Museum

A caudle (or caudel) was a hot drink that recurred in various guises throughout British cuisine from the Middle Ages into Victorian times. It was thick and sweet, and seen as particularly suitable and sustaining for invalids and new mothers. At some periods of history, caudle recipes were based on milk and eggs, like eggnog. Later variants were more similar to a gruel, a sort of drinkable oatmeal porridge. Like the original forms of posset (a drink of wine and milk, rather than a set dessert), a caudle was usually alcoholic.

There were special caudle cups, larger than teacups, often with a cover, and perhaps two handles. These were either in pottery or metal, and might be given as presents.

== Etymology ==
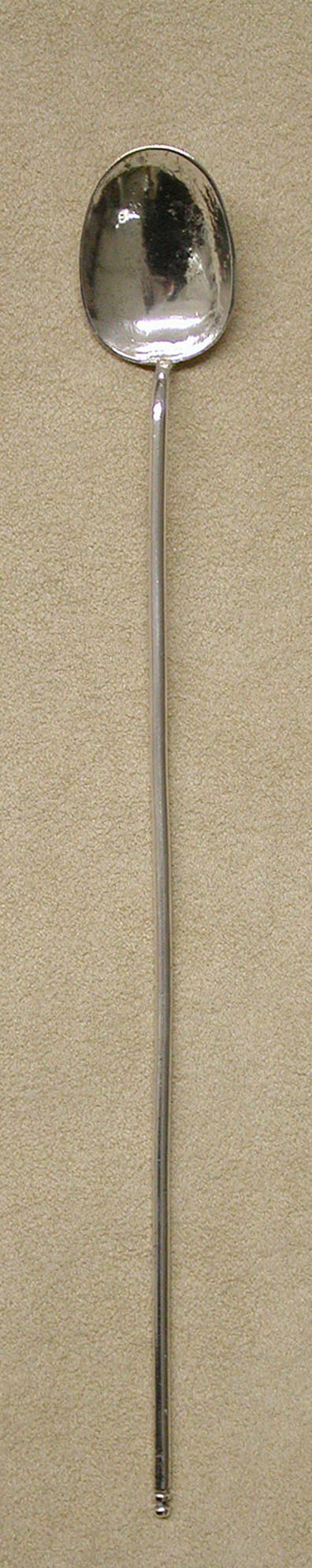
A silver caudle spoon, Dutch, 17th-century

The word caudle came into Middle English via the Old North French word caudel, ultimately derived from Latin caldus, "warm". According to the Encyclopædia Britannica Eleventh Edition, the word derived from Medieval Latin caldellum, a diminutive of caldum, a warm drink, from calidus, hot. The Oxford English Dictionary cites the use of the word to 1297. The word's etymological connection to heat makes it cognate with "cauldron".

== Recipes ==
A related recipe for skyr, a cultured dairy product, appears in the early 13th century. The earliest surviving recipe for caudle, from 1300 to 1325, is simply a list of ingredients: wine, wheat starch, raisins, and sugar to "abate the strength of the wine".

Another recipe from the late 14th century has more ingredients and more details on the cooking procedure: mix breadcrumbs, wine, sugar or honey, and saffron, bring to a boil, then thicken with egg yolks, and sprinkle with salt, sugar, and ginger. A 15th-century English cookbook includes three caudle recipes: ale or wine is heated and thickened with egg yolks and/or ground almonds, then optionally spiced with sugar, honey, saffron, and/or ginger (one recipe specifically says "no salt"). In a description of an initiation ceremony at Merton College, Oxford in 1647, caudle is described as a "syrupy gruel with spices and wine or ale added". William Carew Hazlitt provides a number of recipes for caudles and possets in his 1886 book, Old Cookery Books and Ancient Cuisine.

The Encyclopædia Britannica Eleventh Edition describes it as "a drink of warm gruel, mixed with spice and wine, formerly given to women in childbed", i.e. as a restorative food during her postpartum confinement.

Emily Post's 1922 Etiquette in Society, in Business, in Politics, and at Home, the classic guide to American manners, states that "although according to cook-books caudle is a gruel, the actual "caudle" invariably served at christenings is a hot eggnog, drunk out of little punch cups" (see Punch bowl).

== "For the sick and lying-in" ==
Aside from the initiation ceremony mentioned above, caudle was often served to people who were seen to need strengthening, especially invalids and new mothers. A historian of Georgian England says that maternity hospitals always served a "traditional postlabor fortified caudle" to women who had just given birth. The British Lying-In Hospital had "Laws, Orders, and Regulations" printed to be displayed on the wards, detailing among other things, the menu. Mothers on the "low diet" had caudle; when they graduated to the "common diet" it was beer caudle; and the "full diet" had no need of the invalid liquid anymore.

Maria Rundell included a "caudle for the sick and lying-in" in her best-selling A New System of Domestic Cookery (1806). ("Lying-in" is an obsolete term for childbirth, referring to the extended period of bed rest that marked the traditional recuperation time.) Judith Montefiore likewise included caudle with the "recipes for invalids" in her The Jewish Manual (1846), the first exposition of Jewish cuisine in English. Five years later, The English Housekeeper by Anne Cobbett (daughter of William Cobbett) gives variants of caudles, of either gruel (oatmeal) or rice, with different types of alcohol, and seasonings, including capillaire. She devotes a chapter to invalid food, making the point that "Often when the Doctor's skill has saved the life of his patient [...] it remains for the diligent nurse to prepare the cooling drinks and restorative foods [...]. Everything which is prepared for a sick person should be delicately clean, served quickly, in the nicest order; and in a small quantity at a time."

== Caudle parties ==
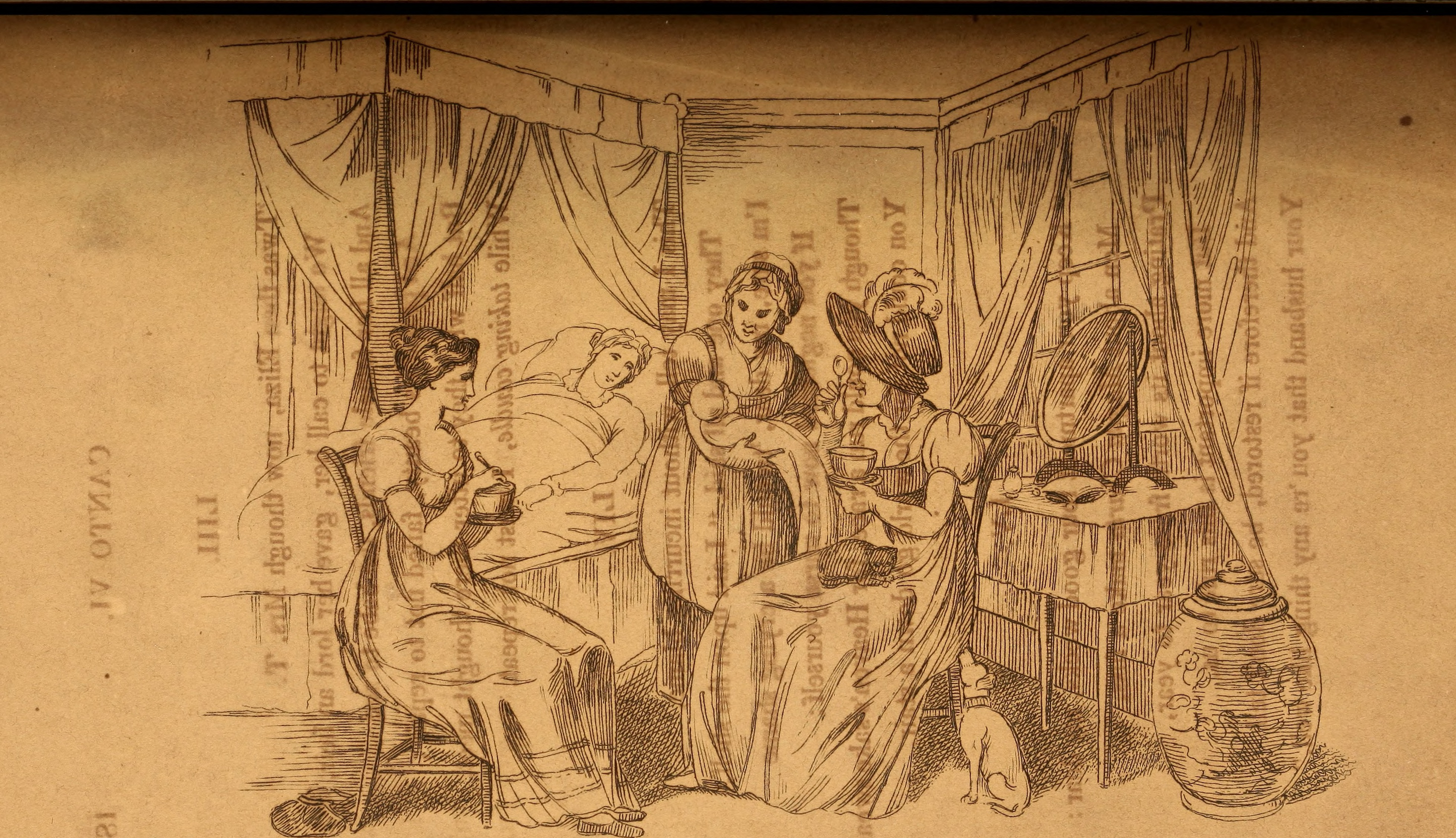
Richard Dagley's illustration "Taking caudle" of Thomas Gaspey's poem. The new mother reclines in a four-poster bed, recouping her energy. A member of the household sits at the foot of the bed, entertaining a visitor, who keeps her bonnet on; both of them are drinking caudle. A maidservant shows the baby to the visitor, while a dog and cat look on.

As caudel was served to new mothers to build up their strength, so it was offered to their visitors, to share in the happy occasion. "Cake and caudel" or "taking caudle" became the accepted phrases for a "lying-in visit", when women went to see their friends' new babies. These were all-female occasions, as more than one man noted. The American playwright Royall Tyler has one of the female characters in the comedy of manners The Contrast (1787) decline the offer of a man's escorting her by claiming that "half [her] visits are cake and caudel" and therefore unsuitable for him. A generation later in 1821, Thomas Gaspey wrote of these visits (with the italics in the original):

'Twas then Eliza, though now Mrs. T.
We ought to call her, gave her lord an heir,
And all her female friends, the babe to see
And praise its beauty, failed not to repair;
But half what they to utter there thought meet,
While taking caudle, I must not repeat.

Offering caudel, or cake and caudel, to all lying-in visitors is referred to as an old British custom. Queen Charlotte, consort of George III, bore him 15 princes and princesses. After the christening of the youngest, Princess Amelia in 1783, "the greater part of the company then paid a visit to the nursery, where they were entertained (as usual on such occasions) with cake and caudel." This continued into Queen Victoria's reign: the day after she gave birth to the Prince of Wales, "many of the female Nobility called at Buckingham Palace, and were received by Lady Charlemont, the Lady in waiting, and after taking caudle were taken to the north wing to see the infant Prince."

But it was not just nobles who came. The Court Magazine and Belle Assemblée reported that the aftermath of a royal birth was "a usual reception of the public to cake and caudel". The London Chronicle reported in 1765 that "The resort of different ranks of people at St. James's to receive the Queen's Caudle is now very great."

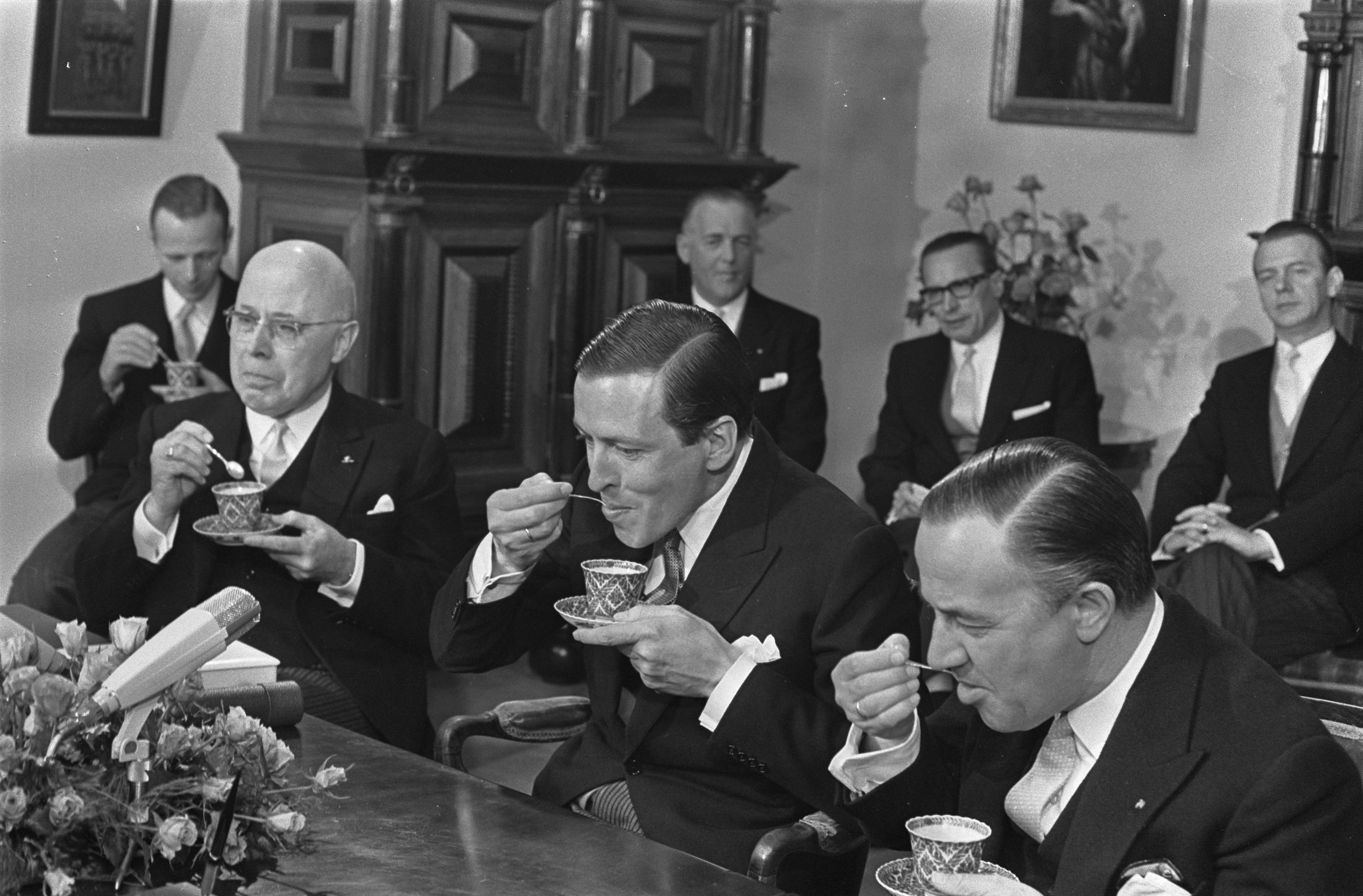
Formal caudle party after the birth of King Willem-Alexander of the Netherlands in 1967

After the birth of Princess Augusta Sophia, the sixth child of George III and Queen Charlotte:

Connected with the event of her Royal Highness's birth, during the usual reception of the public to cake and caudle, on Sunday 13th of November, 1768, a curious incident occurred at the Palace: - two young ladies, after having drunk plentifully of caudle, were detected in carrying off a large portion of the cake, and some of the cups in which the caudle had been served; they were allowed, however, to escape with a severe reprimand, after begging pardon on their knees for so disgraceful an act.

In England, the custom had died out by around 1850, but the birth of the current King Willem-Alexander of the Netherlands in Utrecht in 1967 was celebrated there a few days later by an apparently all-male caudle (candeel in Dutch) party including his father, the Prime Minister, and other dignitaries, who wore morning dress to eat caudle with teaspoons from highly decorated handleless cups with saucers, held up near the mouth, as the photos in the state archives show. The event was held in the Utrecht city hall, where after the caudle the new prince's birth was registered by the mayor. The birth of the prince's mother, Queen Beatrix of the Netherlands, in 1938 had also been celebrated with a caudle party.

== Caudle cups ==
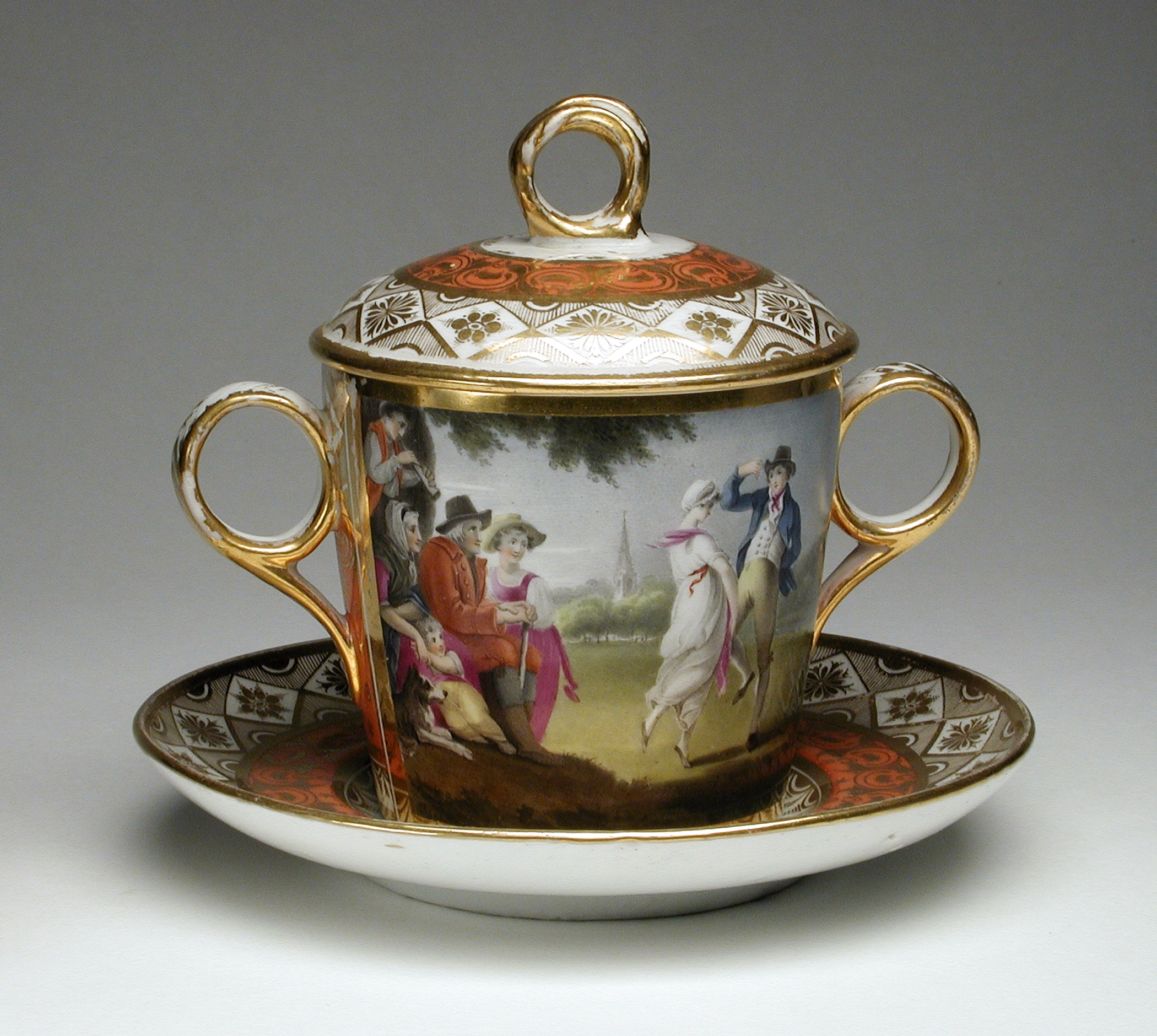
Caudle cup in Worcester porcelain, 1805

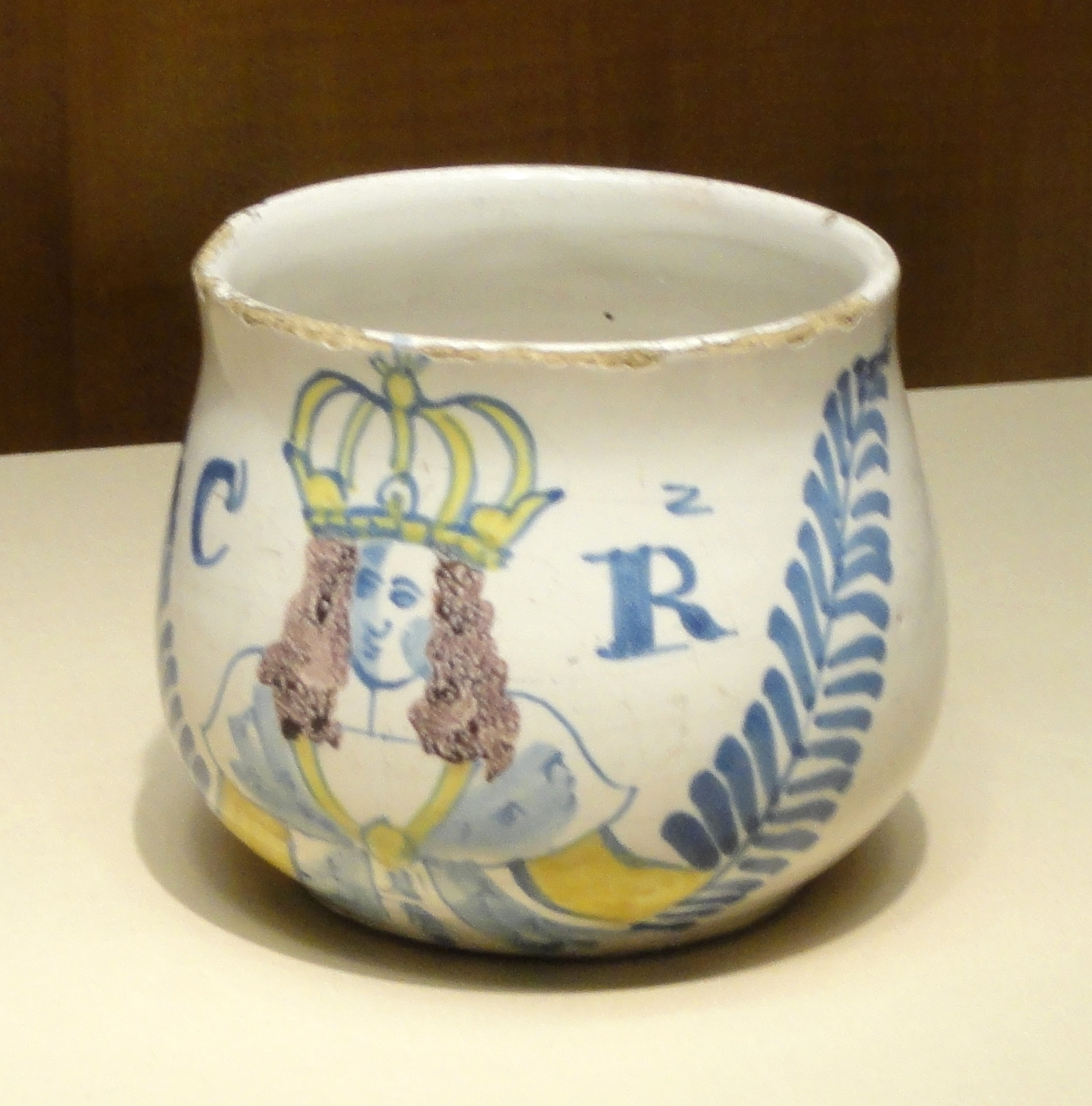
An earthenware caudle cup depicting King Charles II of England, 1660s, Nelson-Atkins Museum of Art

There was a vessel particular to the drink, the caudle cup, a traditional gift, either for a pregnant woman, or on visits by female friends to the mother lying-in. Late 17th and early 18th-century examples in silver are low bulbous bowls with two handles, and often a cover. These were passed around among the company.

Poorer people used small bulbous and handleless earthenware cups, often painted with the monarch. In the early 18th century lidded "spout pots" were used; these were two-handled with a teapot-style spout on one of the other sides. As European porcelain developed in the 18th century, the two-handled cup with a cover, similar to the shape called a "chocolate cup" in continental examples, but often more bulbous, became the usual form of caudle cup, now with a saucer. These were typically highly decorated with overglaze enamel painting, and presented by the wealthy in pairs to new mothers. They were now smaller, and probably for individual use. Other than their use when lying-in, they functioned as cabinet cups, too ornate and expensive for regular use, and displayed in a china cabinet. In a London auction of Chelsea porcelain and Derby porcelain in 1771 the most expensive examples were sold for £12 for a pair, a considerable sum. They continued to be made through the 19th century as cabinet pieces, after the custom of consuming caudle largely died away.

At lower levels of society, an alternative pottery gift to bring to a lying-in caudle party was a model cradle complete with baby, into which coins or a small gift were added. These were rarely of fine porcelain.

== Other uses ==
A caudle formed part of the Beltane (May Day) fire festival celebrations collated by James Frazier in The Golden Bough. He quotes at length Thomas Pennant, "who traveled in Perthshire in the year 1769":

on the first of May, the herdsmen of every village hold their Bel-tien, a rural sacrifice. They cut a square trench on the ground, leaving the turf in the middle; on that they make a fire of wood, on which they dress a large caudle of eggs, butter, oatmeal and milk; and bring besides the ingredients of the caudle, plenty of beer and whisky; for each of the company must contribute something. The rites begin with spilling some of the caudle on the ground, by way of libation: on that everyone takes a cake of oatmeal, upon which are raised nine square knobs, each dedicated to some particular being, the supposed preserver of their flocks and herds, or to some particular animal, the real destroyer of them: each person then turns his face to the fire, breaks off a knob, and flinging it over his shoulders, says, 'This I give to thee, preserve thou my horses; this to thee, preserve thou my sheep; and so on.' After that, they use the same ceremony to the noxious animals: 'This I give to thee, O fox! spare thou my lambs; this to thee, O hooded crow! this to thee, O eagle!' When the ceremony is over, they dine on the caudle; and after the feast is finished, what is left is hid by two persons deputed for that purpose; but on the next Sunday they reassemble, and finish the reliques of the first entertainment.

Frazier notes other Scottish May Day celebrations with similar dishes, "a repast of eggs and milk in the consistence of a custard".

Apparently it was "a custom in France to bring the bridegroom a caudle in the middle of the night on his wedding-night", according to an explanatory note in an 1877 edition of The Essays of Montaigne, presumably inserted by the English editor, William Carew Hazlitt.

== See also ==
- List of hot beverages
- Wassail
- Groaning food, another British tradition following childbirth
