= Hutch (furniture) =

Shelves or cabinets above a counter unit

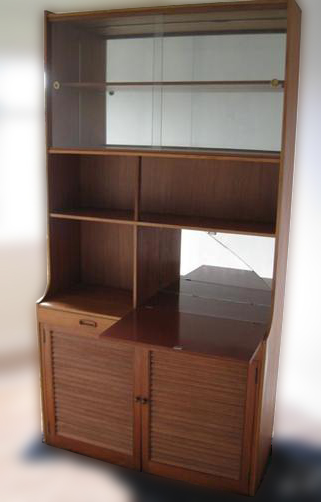

A hutch is an American English word for a particular type of furniture with a set of shelves or cabinets placed on top of a lower unit with a counter and either drawers or cabinets. Modern hutches are typically made of timber. The term originates from a hutch table.

== Description ==
A modern hutch usually comprises a set of shelves or cabinets placed on top of a lower unit with a counter and either drawers or cabinets. Hutches are often seen in the form of desks, dining room, or kitchen furniture. It is frequently referred to by furniture aficionados as a hutch dresser. In the 18th and early 19th century, however, the term hutch or hutch table referred to a tabletop set onto a base in such a way that when the table was not in use, the top pivoted to a vertical position and became the back of a chair or wider settee; (Note: In British English this type of furniture is known as a monks bench.) this was a very useful form at a time when many homes had a large room used for multiple functions, because it allowed a large dining table to swing up and out of the way.

== Features ==
Typically fashioned from timber, modern hutch dressers can range from country cottage style (frequently solid timber, sometimes adorned with ornate scrollwork) to the sleek lines of the wood grain veneer style popularised throughout the 1960s to 1980s. Many hutches from recent decades feature a mirror in the back of the upper shelving to give the additional appearance of depth and to better display the fineries kept within (in a similar manner to a china cabinet).

Amongst the most desirable of the 1960s veneered kind are those featuring a fold down liquor compartment where the fold down compartment door serves to increase the worktop area for setting out the glassware and preparing a drink. These liquor compartments often feature a mirror at the back and frequently the inner wood veneer surface of the door (becoming the worktop surface) is polished to a high lustre, increasing the overall effect thus impressing guests and onlookers.

== See also ==
- Hoosier cabinet
- Welsh dresser (also called a china hutch): a traditional piece of furniture used to display tableware, such as crockery, silverware and pewter-ware.
