= Cabinet piece =

A Cabinet piece may refer to:

- a Cabinet painting
- a porcelain object too fine for regular use, such as a cabinet cup
