= Irish dresser =

Type of kitchen furniture

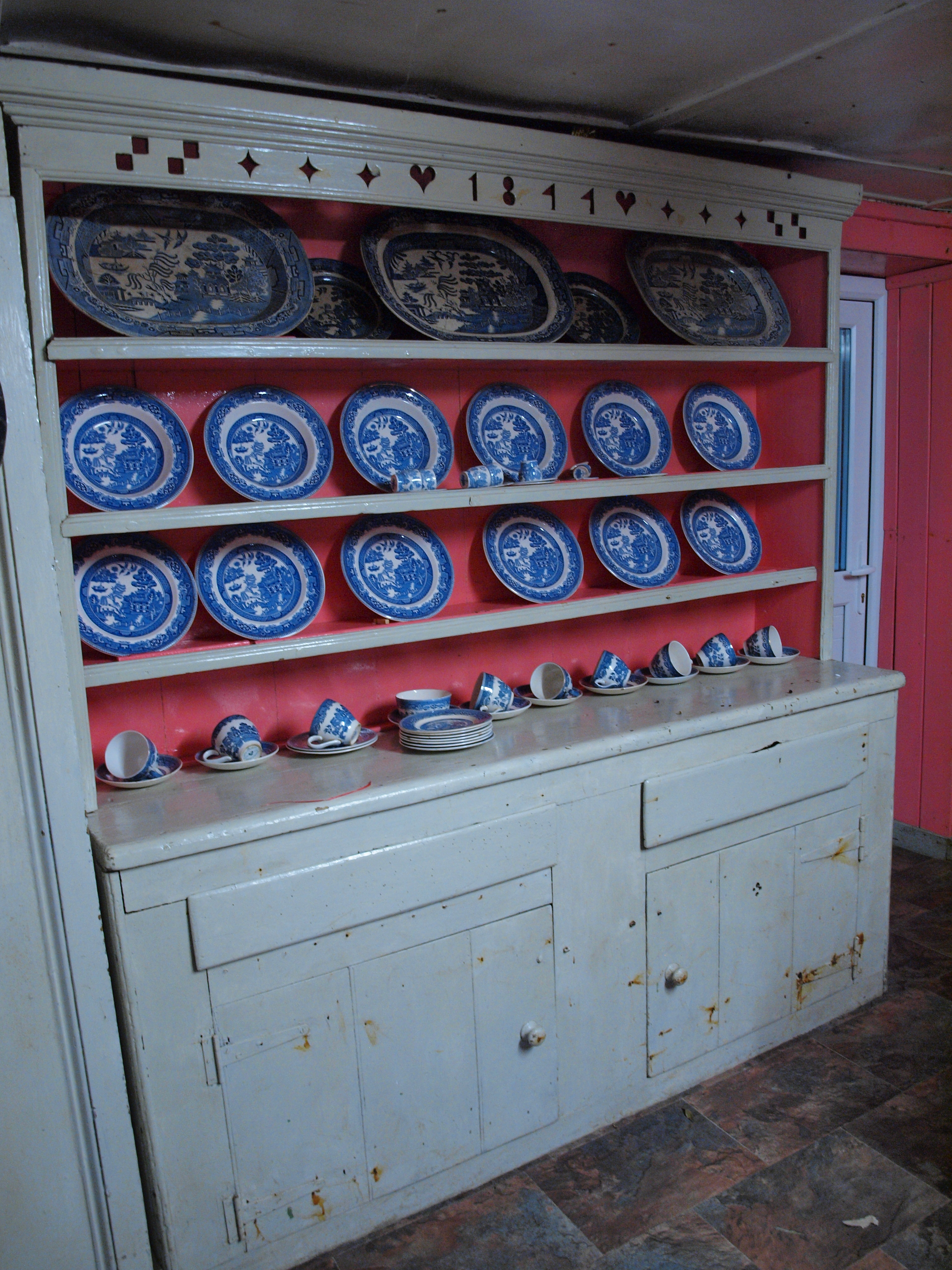
Irish dresser from County Carlow (1844)

An Irish dresser (Hiberno English), sometimes known as a kitchen dresser, is a piece of wooden Irish vernacular furniture consisting of open storage or cupboards in the lower part, with shelves and a work surface, and a top part for the display of crockery, but also any objects of monetary or sentimental value.

== History ==
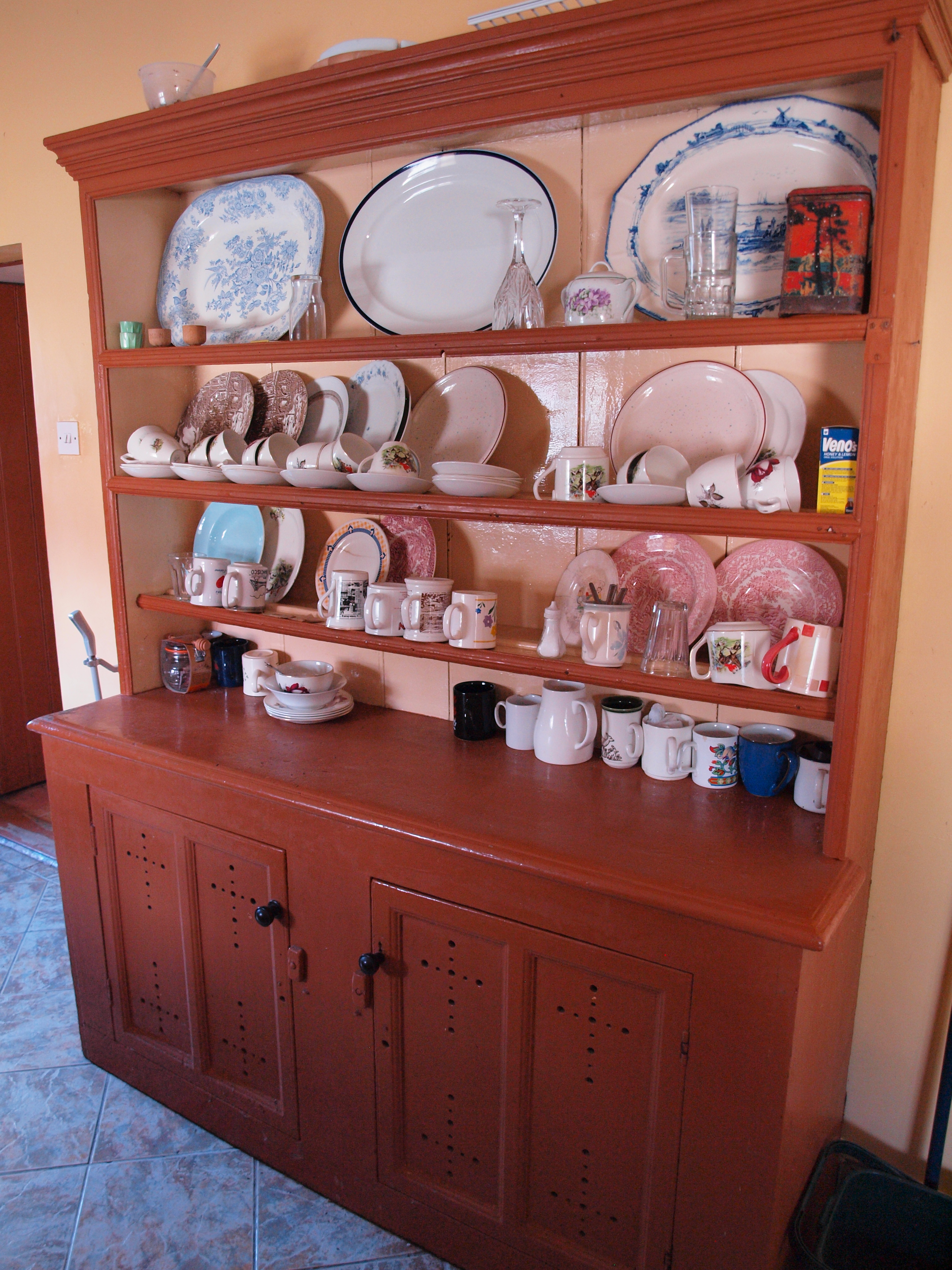
Irish dresser from County Carlow (c. 1890–1900)

The Irish dresser is traditionally one piece, distinguishing it from the Welsh dresser, which is historically two pieces (the top and bottom sections), and would have cupboards or an area of open storage in the base. The open area at the bottom would consist of one or two open cupboards, at times with a central upright. The dressers were typically made of pine and earlier ones were stained. As bright colour gloss paint became more easily available in the 20th century, dressers were often painted and repainted frequently. The inside shelves of the top part were generally painted a different, lighter colour, to further highlight the objects on display.

In some kitchens, the dresser was constructed in the room as a piece of built-in furniture with some dressers back boards forming part of the wall behind. In other examples, the dresser worked as a room divider, or was used as a structural support for a loft space above. Dressers were often a gift from the groom to the bride upon marriage, either made or purchased by the groom. Before the construction of these wooden dressers from the late 1700s onwards, traditional Irish houses would have had stone shelves which were built into the walls of the house. Some shelves were made using slate and had wooden doors.

According to the National Museum of Ireland, the Irish dresser was traditionally the most important item of domestic furniture in homes in Ireland. It was used to display the status and wealth of the family through the display of items, primarily ceramic objects known in Ireland as "Delph" or "ware". In the 1700 and 1800s it was common for some households to be so poor as to not have any eating utensils at all, so the display of all the household's utensils and crockery in a dresser denoted a higher status to all those who saw it. Even damaged objects would be kept and retained, with some repaired by "tinkers", primarily from the Irish Traveller community.

The shelves, with bars to hold the plates in place, were in varying heights to allow for the display of plates from large serving platters down to saucers, while maximising the light thrown onto the reflective surfaces of the plates and minimising the dust and dirt that could accumulate on them. In the southern areas of Ireland, the large plates would be stored on the bottom shelf, but in the north the order was reversed with the largest plates displayed on the top shelf. Dressers would have between two and four shelves, which would feature wooden moulding, or if the household could not afford that it was substituted with paper or oil cloth cut and draped over the edge of the shelf.

Early dressers were more likely to have open storage at the bottom, which would have held containers of milk, butter, and fresh water. The earlier forms of the dresser would feature feet known as sleigh, shoe or boot feet. These feet helped to spread the weight of the dresser, especially on uneven earthen floors. Attached by dovetails, these feet could be removed if the rotted away in the potentially damp conditions of Irish farm houses. The feet show an influence from English and Scottish planted settlers in Ireland, and are primarily found in the northern parts of Ireland.

In the late 20th and early 21st centuries, the dressers were used less as functional pieces of kitchen storage for everyday use, and were used more to display souvenirs and other sentimental objects. The use of the traditional Irish dresser fell into steep decline with the adoption of built-in modern kitchens in Irish homes from the 1970s onwards.

== Variations ==
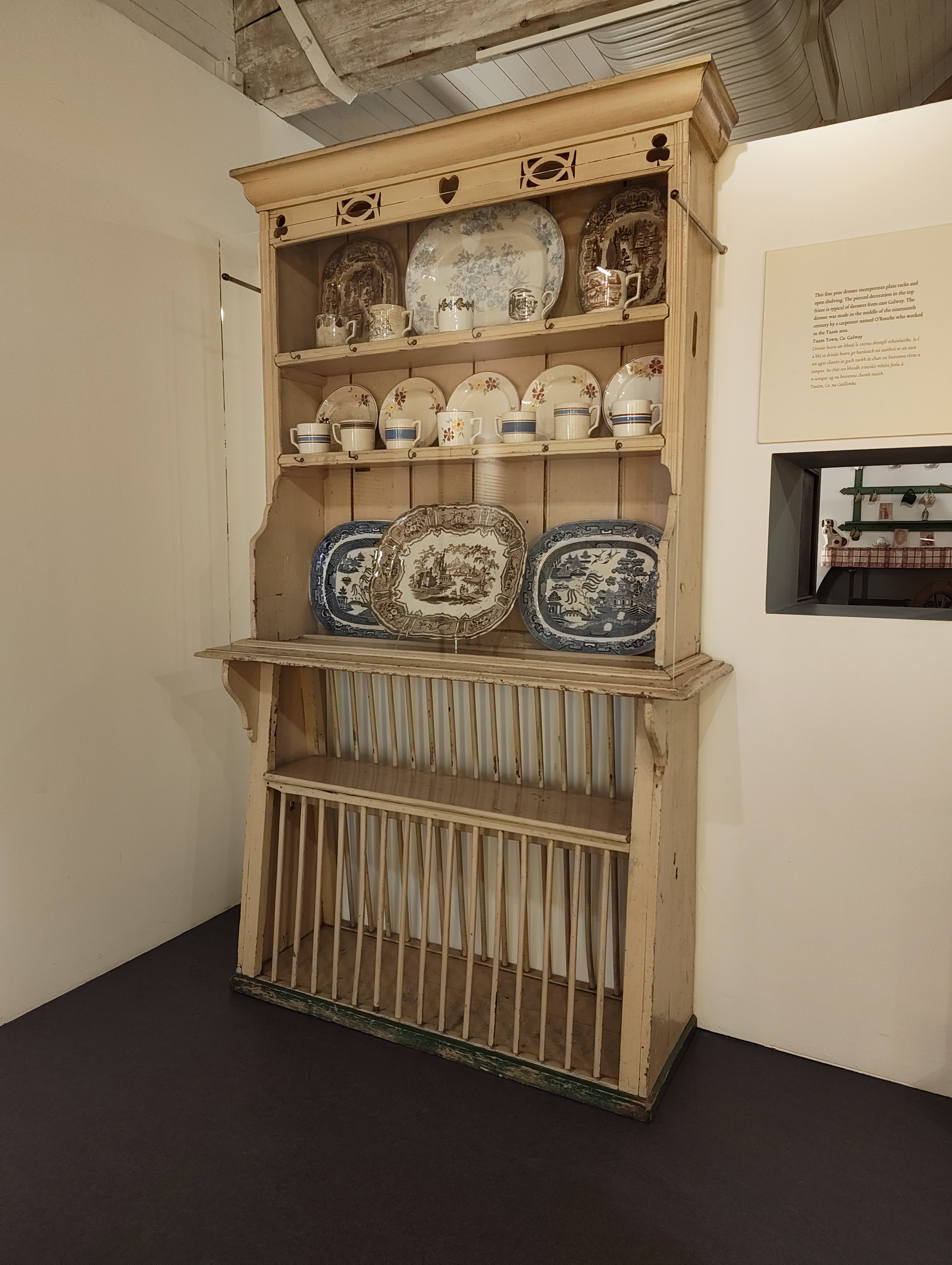
Irish dresser with coop section on display in National Museum of Ireland, Collins Barracks

=== Coop dresser ===
The coop dresser was a variation of the Irish dresser, in which the bottom section was used to hold hens or other fowl. Keeping the fowl indoors kept the birds at a warmer temperature ensuring a supply of eggs year round or to protect them from predators. The section to hold the birds often featured a slatted structure as an enclosure.

=== Hanging dresser ===
The hanging dresser was a precursor to the full dresser, and in poorer homes was a smaller, more affordable piece of furniture. The hanging dresser consisted of just the top part of the full dresser, hung from a wall with no lower storage. It was sometimes called a cup rack, tin rail, tin rack or just the rack. Some, more elaborate hanging dressers, featured fretwork, and drawers mimicking the full size dresser, with simpler versions more akin to a rack to hang items from. These kept more delicate and expensive pieces of homeware safe and on display.

== See also ==
- Hoosier cabinet
- Hutch (furniture)
- Sideboard
