= Monks bench =

Multipurpose furniture piece

A monks bench or hutch table is a piece of furniture where a tabletop is set onto a chest in such a way that when the table was not in use, the top pivots to a vertical position and becomes the back of a settle, and this configuration allows easy access to the chest lid which forms the seat of the piece.

== Overview ==
Percy Blandford notes that "whether monks ever used such a bench is debatable, but it is an attractive name".

A monks bench was a useful form at a time when many homes had a large room used for multiple functions, because it allowed a large dining table to swing up and out of the way.

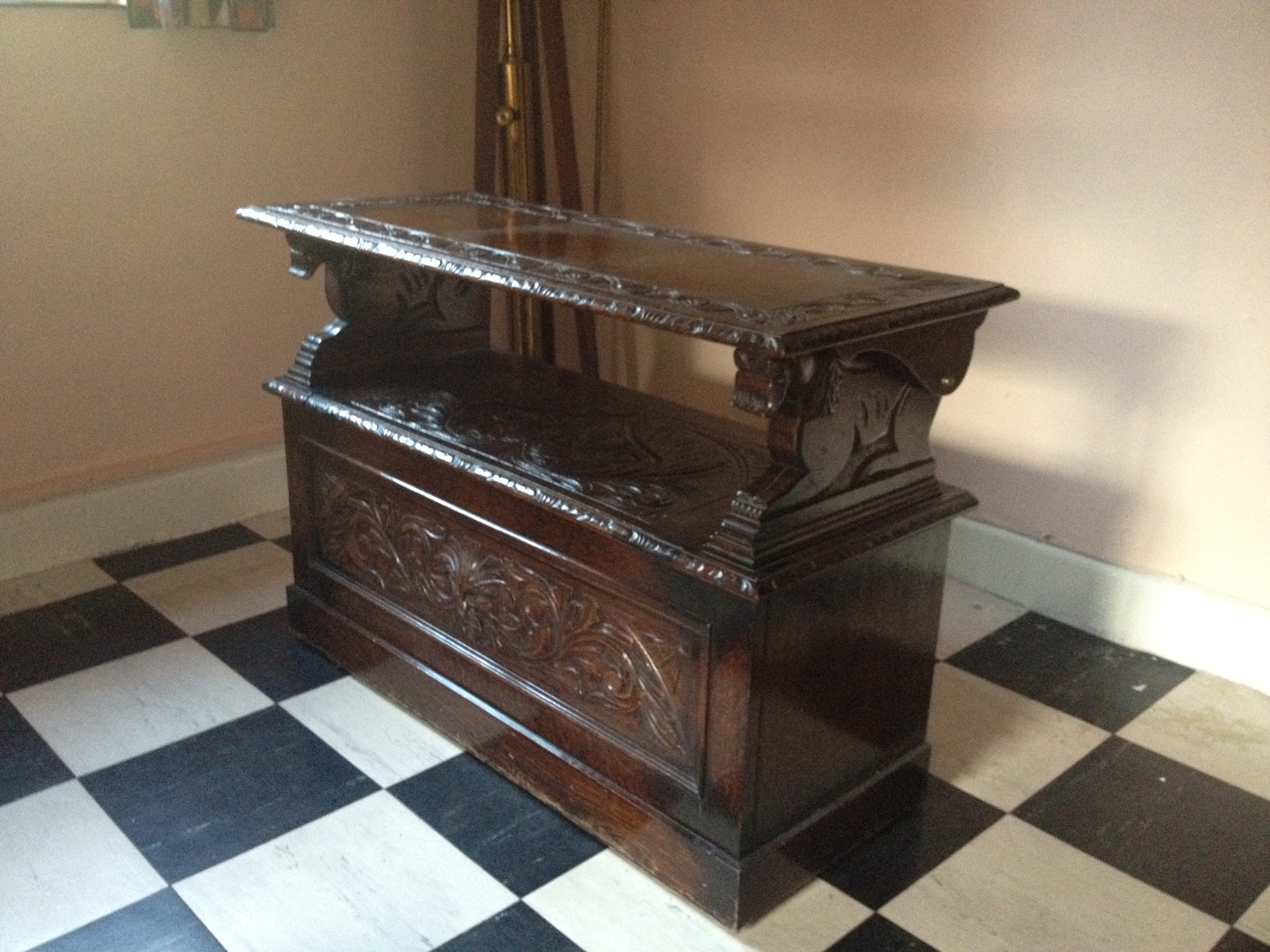
A monks bench configured as a table

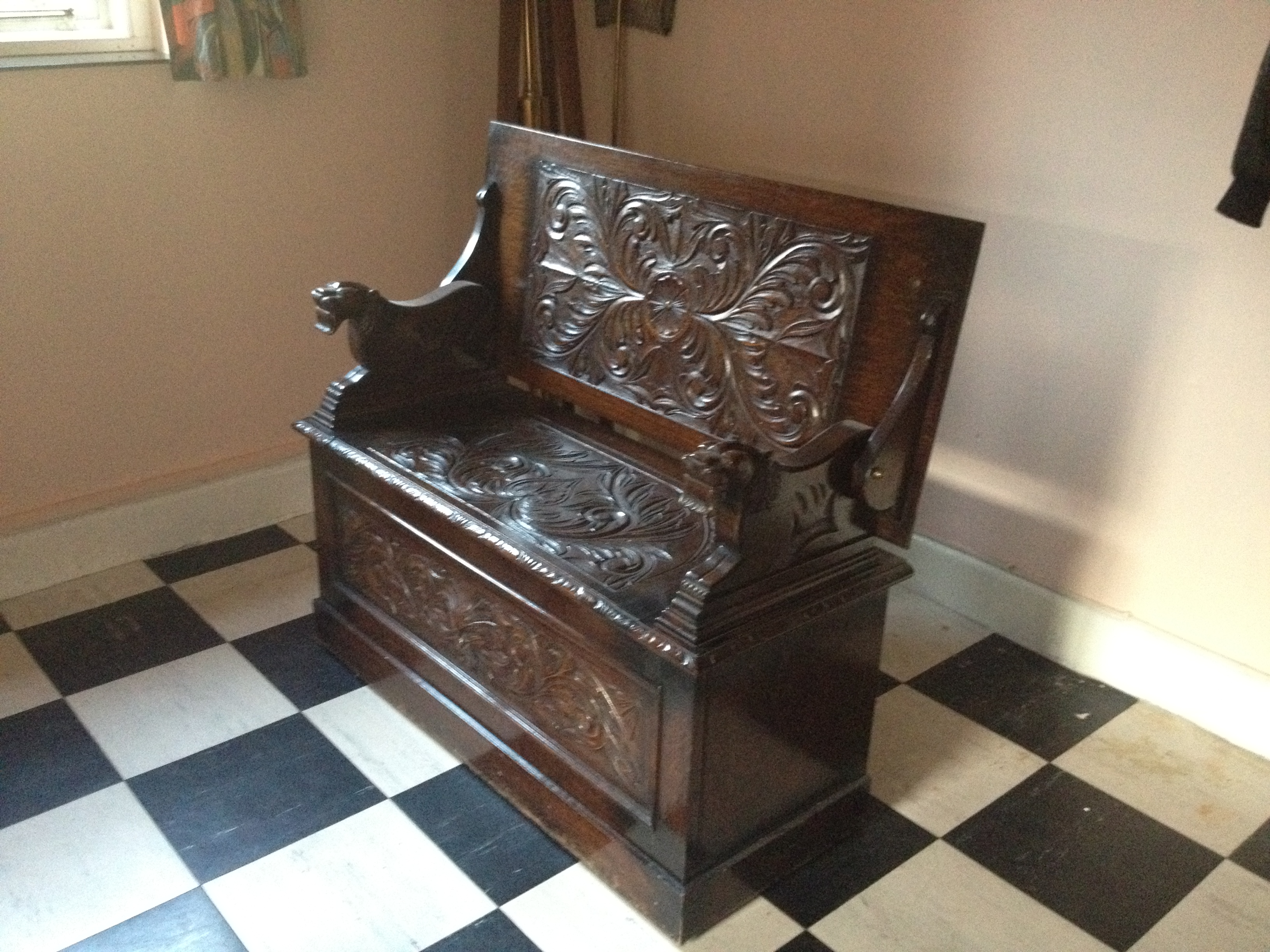
A monks bench configured as a settle

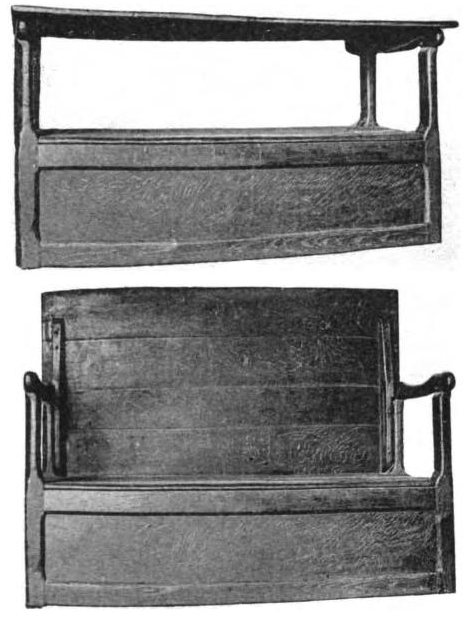
A monks bench from the 1600s

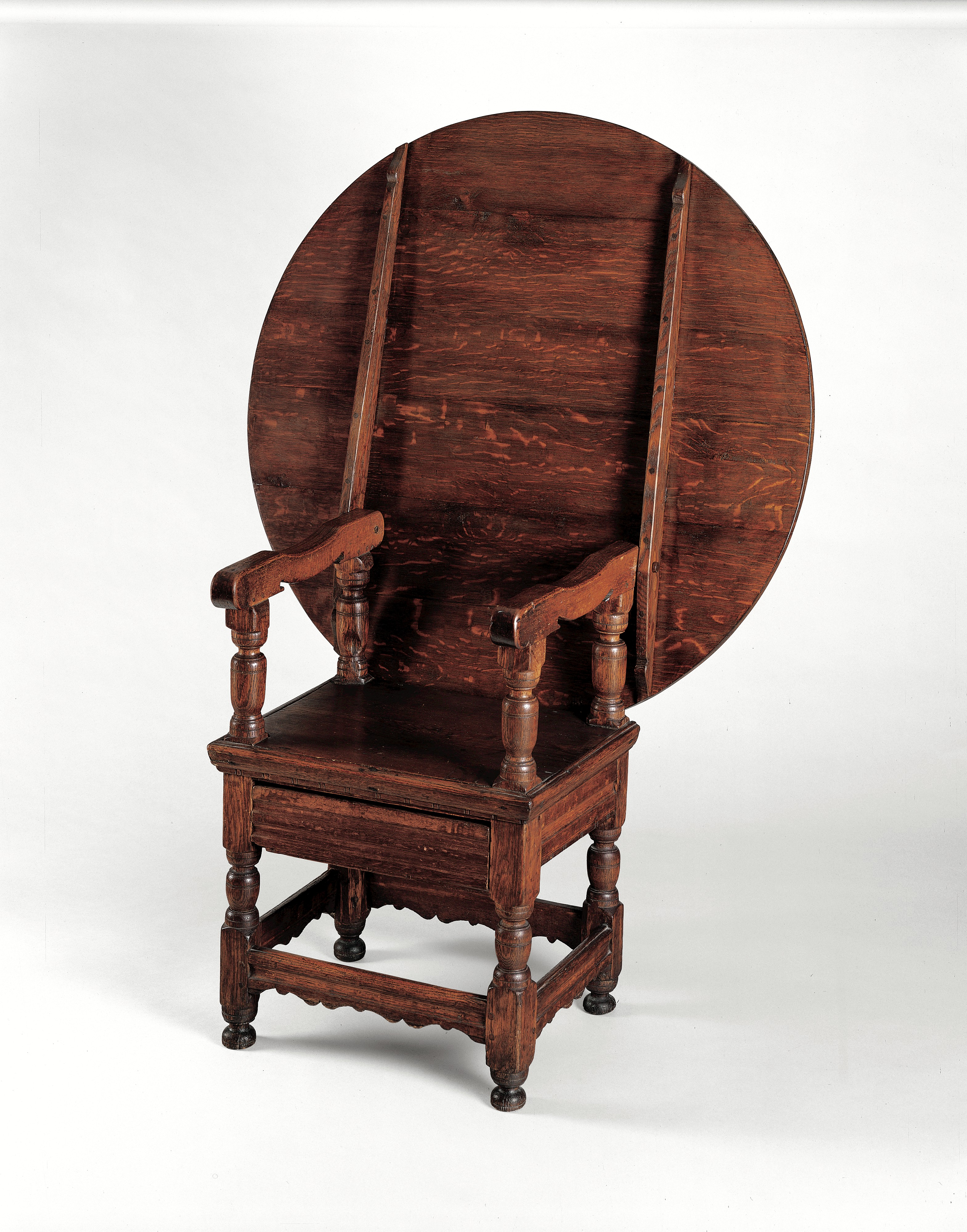
A similar chair-table from the 1600s

== See also ==
- Onit chair
