= Settle (furniture) =

Item of furniture

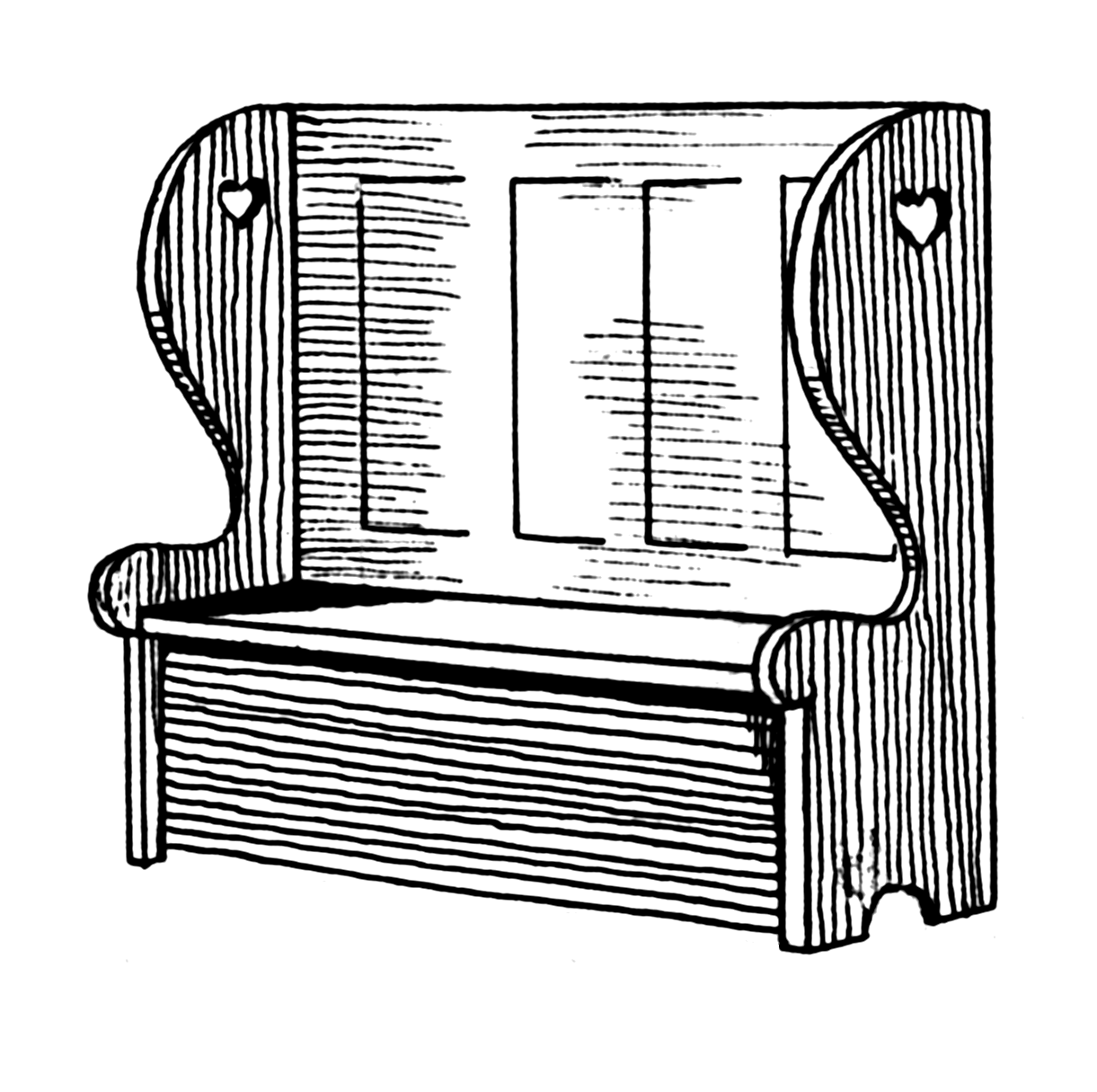
A settle

A settle is a wooden bench, usually with arms and a high back, long enough to accommodate three or four sitters.

== Description ==
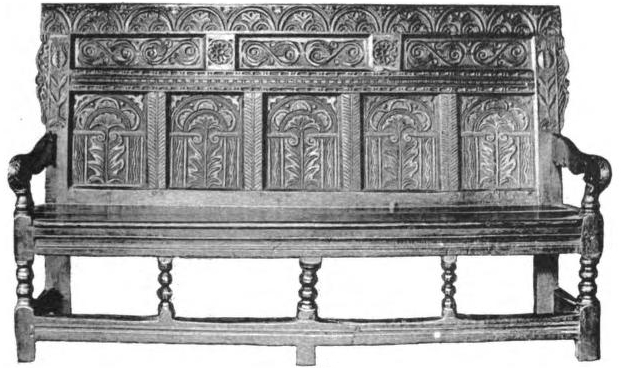
Seventeenth-century oak settle Dimensions: length 70 inches (180 cm), height 41.5 inches (105 cm), depth 23 inches (58 cm).

Settles are commonly movable, but occasionally fixed. The settle shares with the chest and the chair the distinction of great antiquity. Its high back was a protection from the draughts of medieval buildings, protection which was sometimes increased by the addition of winged ends or a wooden canopy. It was most frequently placed near the fire in the common sitting-room. According to historian Claudia Kinmonth, in early furniture inventories, the use of the terms bench and settle was interchangeable, but generally, a settle was understood to have arms.

Constructed of oak or other hardwood, it was extremely heavy, solid, and durable. Few English examples of earlier date than the middle of the 16th century are extant; survivals from the Jacobean period are more numerous. Settles of the more expensive type were often elaborately carved or incised; others were divided into plain panels. They were commonly used in farmhouse kitchens or manorial halls. Its vogue did not long outlast the first half of the 18th century.

=== Variations ===
Elaborate specimens of oak settles with very tall backs, sometimes a cupboard built into them, or a box under the seat, are referred to as "monks settles", but Frederick Robinson writing in 1905 was of the opinion that none of them were of any great age. Two pre-reformation settles of which he was aware are in Winchester Cathedral. Neither of them contain cupboards or boxes. The English architect and designer William Burges designed the Zodiac settle, made between 1869 and 1870. The settle is painted and illustrated with dancing Zodiac signs, and adorned with inlaid pieces of glass crystal and vellum.

In Ireland, settles were a feature of domestic furniture into the 20th century. Historically, some areas of the country had settles with distinctive features. In the south and west of the country, settles were often constructed with a heavy open frame of pine, which was morticed and tenoned, with a boarded or panelled backrest. These deep settles were wide enough for someone to sleep comfortably on them, but without cushions, they were a less comfortable seat. Irish immigrants brought this style of "open-frame settles" abroad. In Irish homes, the settle was placed along a back wall, near the hearth, with the panelled back protecting the sitter from the cold, damp walls of traditional Irish houses. In parts of Ireland where timber was more scarce, the back panel was simpler with a more economic use of vertical slats rather than panels. Around counties Cork and Kerry, settles were often called "racks" and were noted as uncomfortable items of furniture. The "Carbery settle" is a settle with a one-legged falling table which was found in County Cork. Examples of these settles are extremely rare. Another variation was similar to the chicken coops built into Irish dressers, with the area underneath the seat used to house turkeys or other vulnerable fowl. In a similar fashion to dressers, all settles in Ireland were often painted in bright gloss paint.

== Settle bed ==
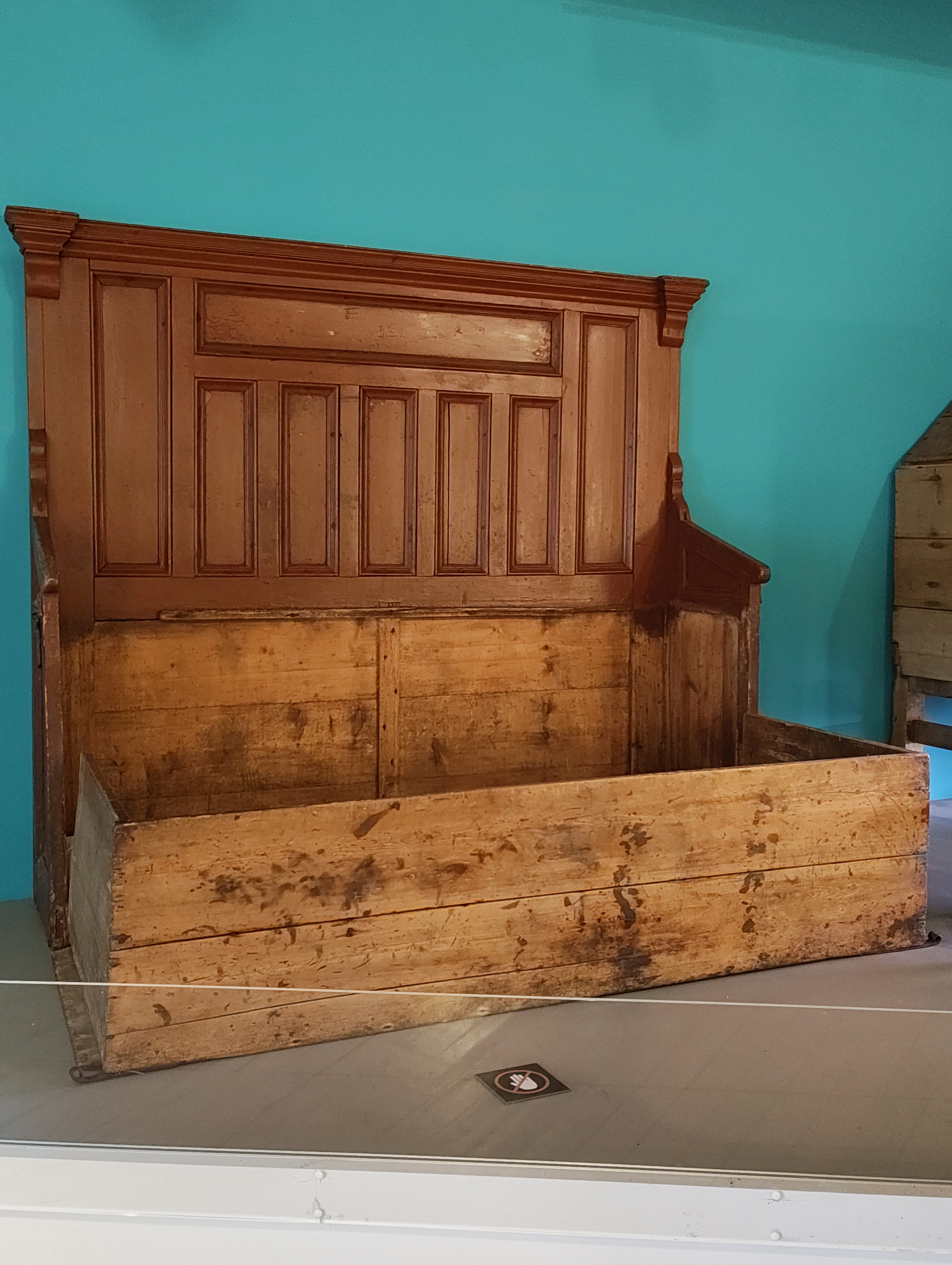
Irish settle bed in the National Museum of Ireland, Collins Barracks

The settle bed was a metamorphising piece of furniture, functioning as a seat during the day, and converting into a bed at night which first appeared in Ireland in the early 1600s. The hinged seat could be opened out onto the floor to create a bed. Settle beds were in regular use in Ireland into the 1950s, with some retained as beds for visitors until the 1990s. These beds were also known as "saddle beds", "press beds", or "sepple beds". The beds could be used to accommodate travelling workmen or craftsmen, or for children. Like dressers, it is likely that most settle beds were constructed in situ.

== Settle table ==
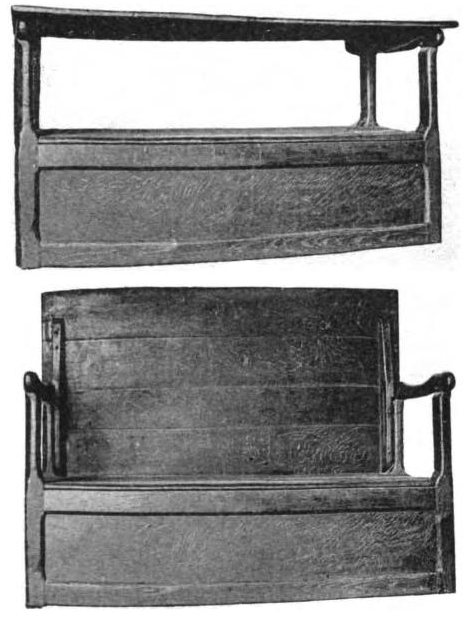
Seventeenth-century settle table combination. Dimensions: length 54 inches (140 cm), height as table 29.5 inches (75 cm), width 28.75 inches (73 cm).

Similar to the settle bed, the settle table (or monk's bench) was a configuration of settle bed which allowed for a hinged back to be tipped 90 degrees for form a table. Settle tables were most common in Ireland in counties Wexford, Kilkenny and Waterford. Examples of settle tables can also be found in England and Wales.

Robinson also describes a specimen of a settle and table combination, with a chest in the seat that was made in the 17th century (see right). "The flanges in the back have a long slit in the lower half, into which fits a peg on the inside of the back of the arm. The back is raised and drawn forwards to serve as a table top as far as the play of the pegs in the slit allows".

== See also ==
- Couch
