= China cabinet =

Furniture to display porcelain

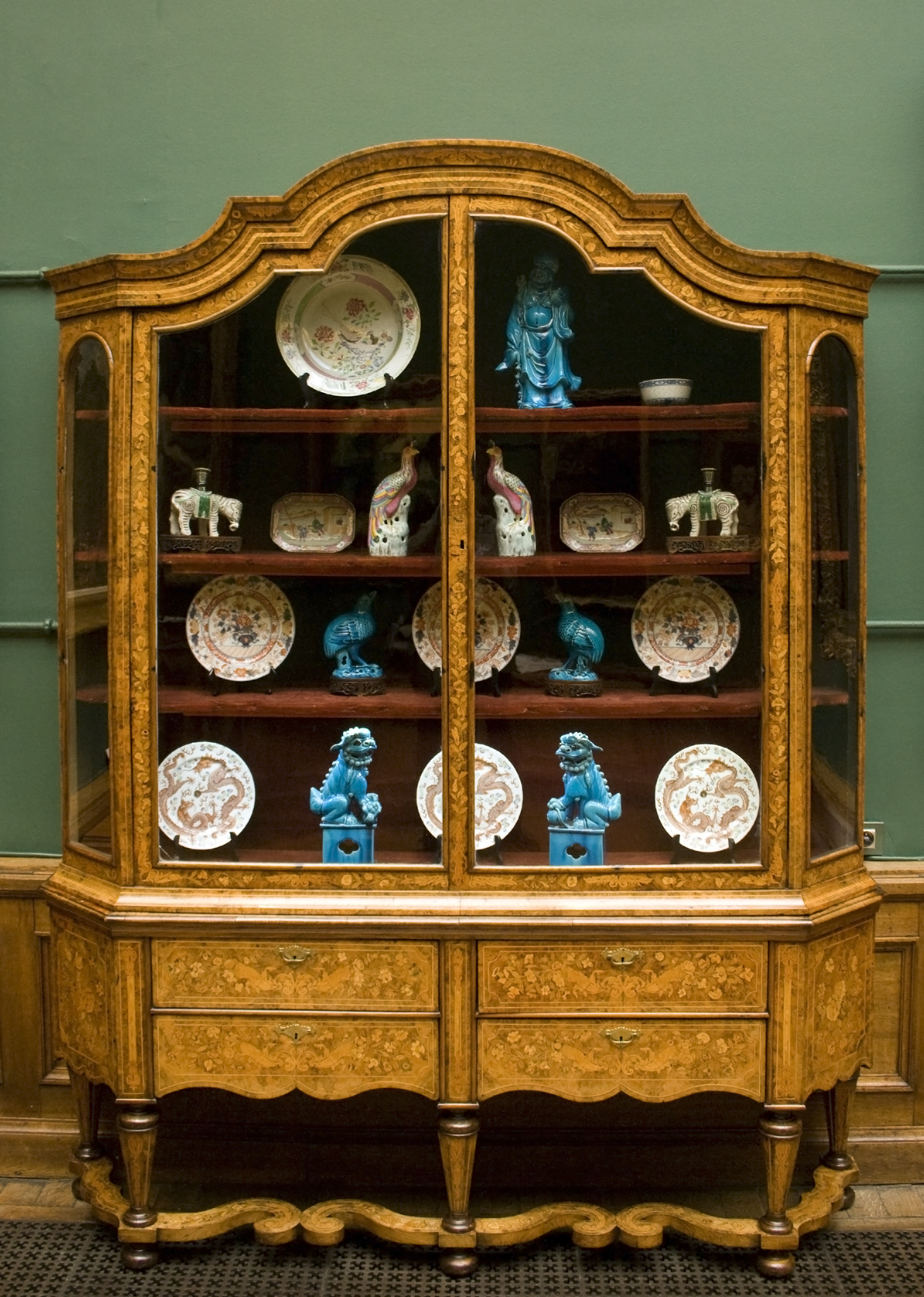
An old china cabinet at the Charlier Museum in Brussels, with Chinese wares.

A china cabinet is a piece of furniture, usually with glass fronts and sides, used to hold and display porcelain ("china") or other ceramics. Typical china held in such cabinets often includes cups, plates, bowls, and glasses. Along with a table, chairs, and a sideboard, the china cabinet is one of the most typical elements of a traditional dining room in the Western world, though they may be placed in any room. Historically, they were used for especially highly decorated cabinet cups, that were too expensive and perhaps fragile for regular use, and made for collectors or to be given as presents.

== Aspects ==
China cabinets are typically placed against a wall, opposite the door or windows. They are often set in a conspicuous place where china, silverware, and glassware can easily be seen by guests and accessed by the host.

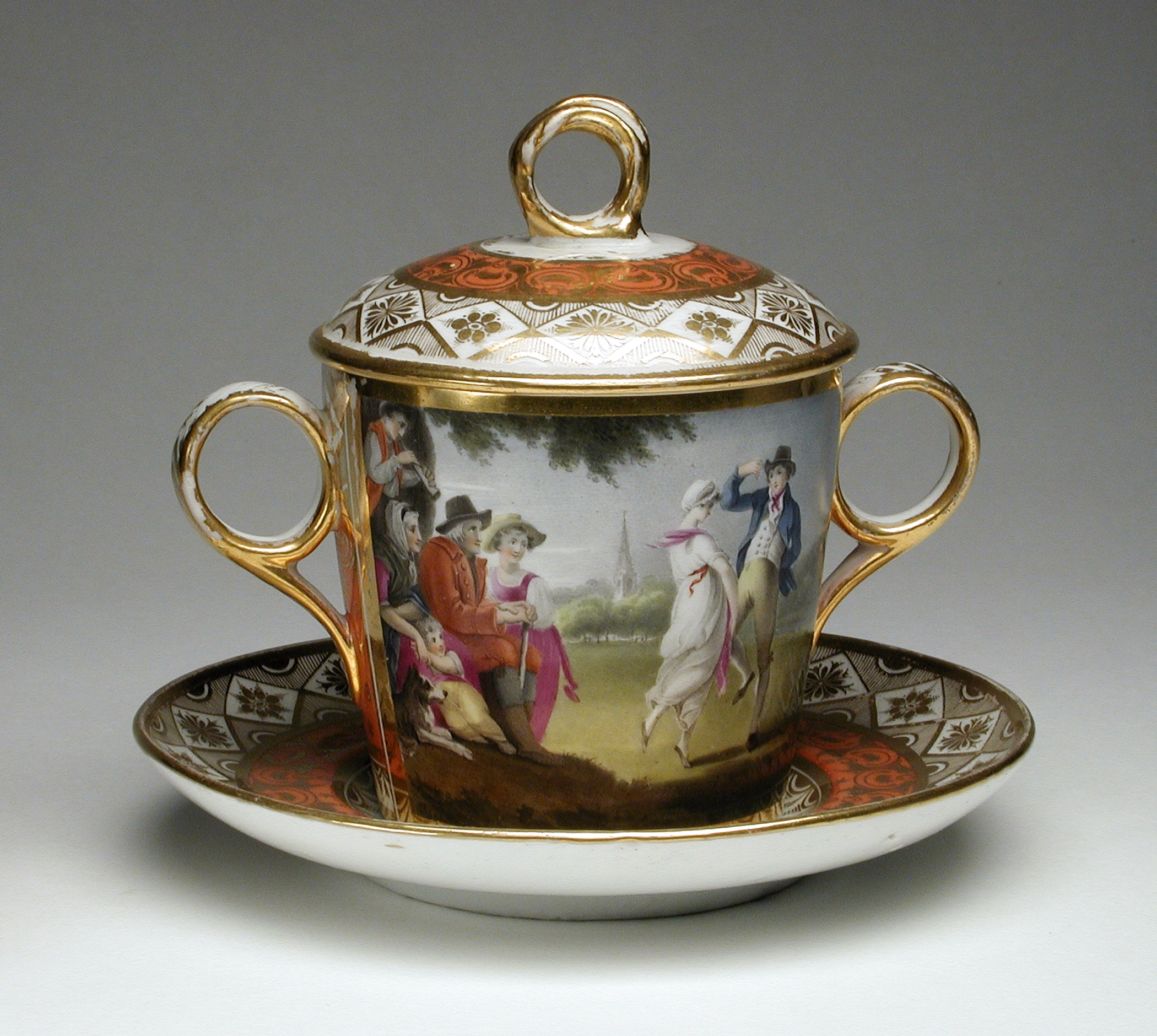
Chamberlain's factory, Worcester, c. 1805. Two-handled cabinet cup with cover, so a caudle cup type, painted with a pastoral scene.

There is an innumerous number of forms for china cabinets, as sizes, shapes, and construction methods may vary. Traditional china cabinets have shelves lined with silk or velvet, or can have glass shelves.

== History ==
The china cabinet already existed by the late 17th century, initially used for Japanese export porcelain and its Chinese equivalent, then very fashionable, especially in England and the Netherlands. William and Mary's reign particularly popularized the furniture and porcelain, as Queen Mary was known for collecting Chinese pottery. At this date European porcelain had not been developed.

Early cabinets were simply designed, often made of walnut. Dutch cabinets began being imported in the late 1600s and early 1700s, and thus English-made cabinets began being influenced by Dutch design. By the middle of the 18th century, china cabinets were typically more elaborate; later cabinets had especially elaborate doors and were lighter weight.

== See also ==
- Welsh dresser
