= Groaning food =

Food served after childbirth

In English folklore, groaning food was food which was occasionally kept uneaten for superstitious reasons, customarily made and served after childbirth.

The word groaning referred to the noises made during childbirth by the woman. The groaning food was served on a groaning board, with the various foods served prefaced by the term 'groaning'. A groaning cheese is a large cheese traditionally divided among the members of a household when a childbirth took place. It was cut from the middle so that the baby, when born, could be passed through it. Groaning cake was another popular groaning food made for the occasion of a birth and retained as a simple talisman afterwards, much like topper from a wedding or birthday cake.

== See also ==
- Postpartum confinement, a period of rest after childbirth, often associated with special food and drink
