= Cabinet cup =

Richly decorated porcelain for display not use

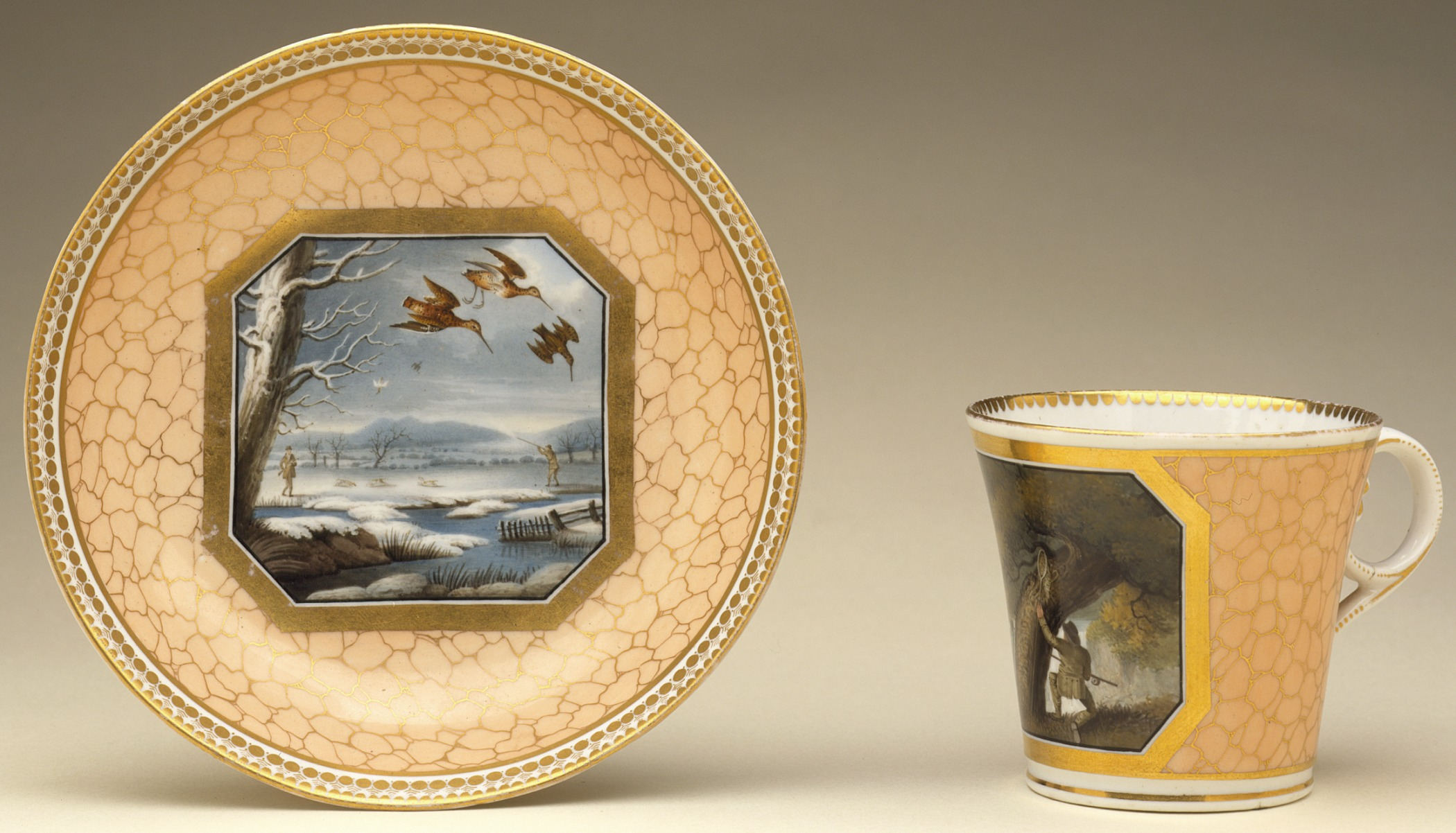
Cabinet Cup and Saucer- 'Snipe Shooting' and 'Worm Fishing', Worcester porcelain, Chamberlain's Factory, c. 1813–16

In European porcelain, a cabinet cup is an unusually richly decorated cup, normally with a saucer, that did not form part of a tea service but was sold singly (or in a pair) to give as a present or to collectors. They were expected to be displayed in a glass-fronted china cabinet rather than put to regular use. The heyday of the cabinet cup was the second half of the 18th century and the first decades of the 19th century; they worked well in the showy Empire style then in fashion. A more general term, also covering plates and other shapes, is cabinet piece.

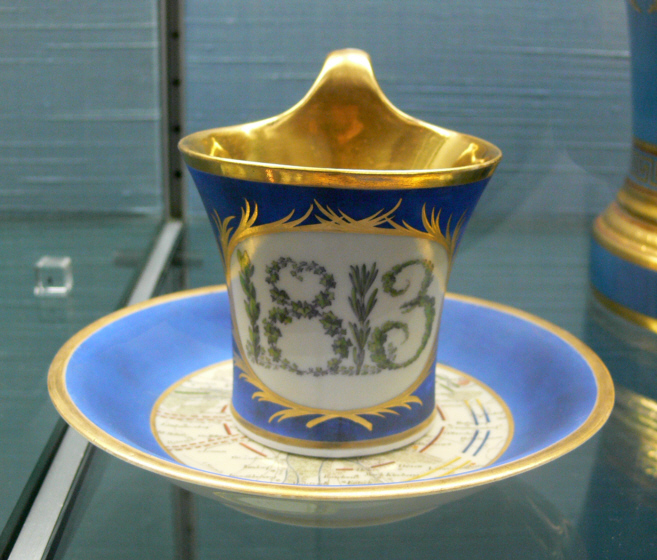
Commemorative cup for the Battle of Leipzig in 1813, with a plan of the battle on the saucer, Berlin porcelain, 1840

The decoration generally included overglaze enamel painting of a very high standard, tending to focus on a single main subject or scene, rather than spreading equally around the cup in a pattern. The saucer was also decorated, often including the central area which would be covered by the cup in use. The bottom of the saucer often lacked the usual depression where the cup sat, as in cabinets the saucer was often displayed placed nearly vertical on a wire holder beside the cup, so that the whole saucer could be seen. Some are pieces commemorating either public events, especially concerning royalty, or private ones. There was often lavish use of gilding, an indication the pieces were not for heavy use, as this often did not wear well.

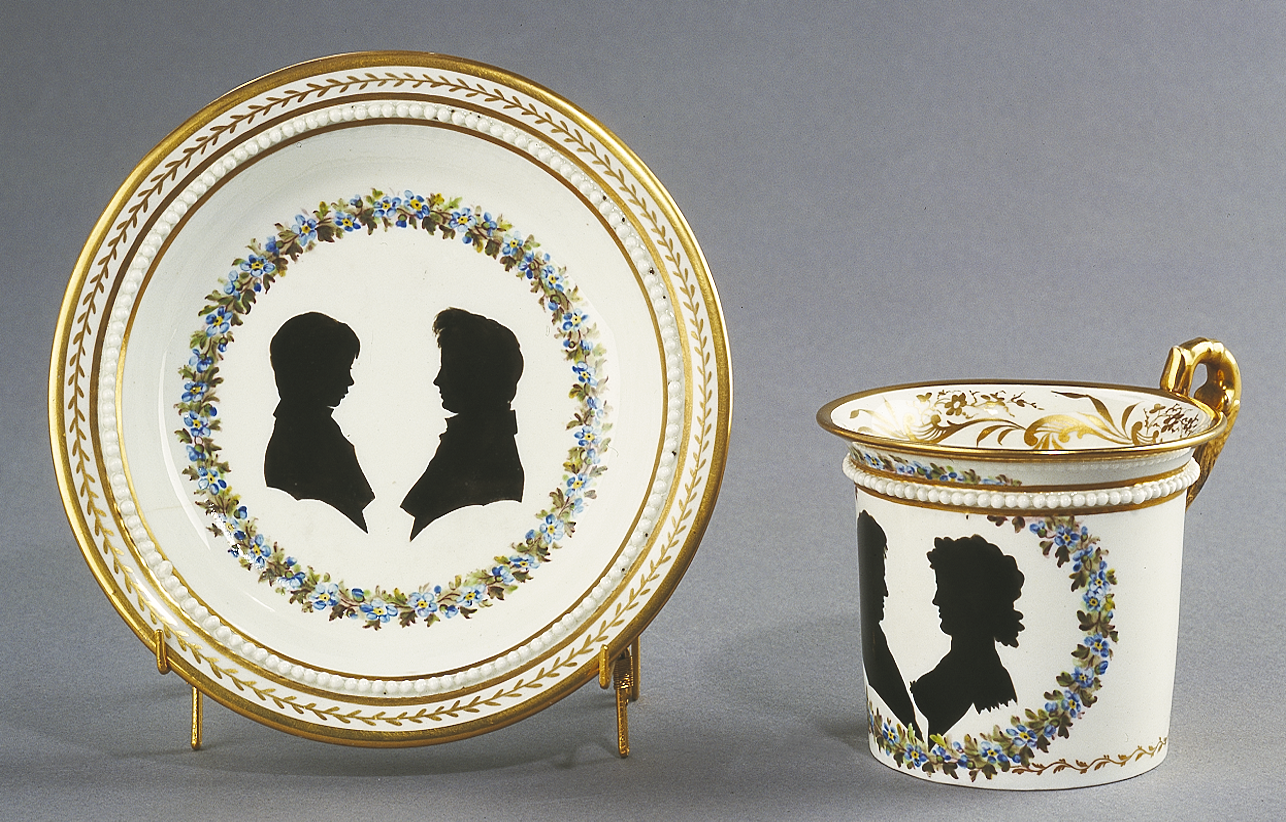
Derby, with family silhouette portraits, c. 1810

The shape of the porcelain body of the cups was sometimes unusual and indeed impractical; there were often two handles. The two-handled cup with a cover is called a "caudle cup" in England, but typically a "chocolate cup" for continental examples. Caudle cups were given as presents to a mother lying-in after childbirth by female friends who gathered to celebrate by consuming this alcoholic porridge-like dish. Mug shapes were also used, and cabinet pieces might be sold as pairs, or sometimes available as small sets; in these cases the main paintings would be different but matching. Derby developed in the 1780s a particular saucerless type of "small straight-sided mugs generally termed 'coffee cans'", which "seem most likely have been conceived as cabinet pieces", and have some of the factory's finest painting.

Most porcelain factories with a reputation for high-quality painting made at least some cabinet cups. Some supplied the unpainted bodies as "blanks" for "outside decoration" by independent hausmaler enamellers. In England, Worcester and Derby were early makers, and continental makers included Sèvres and smaller Parisian factories, Vienna, Berlin, and Meissen.

== Buyers and prices ==
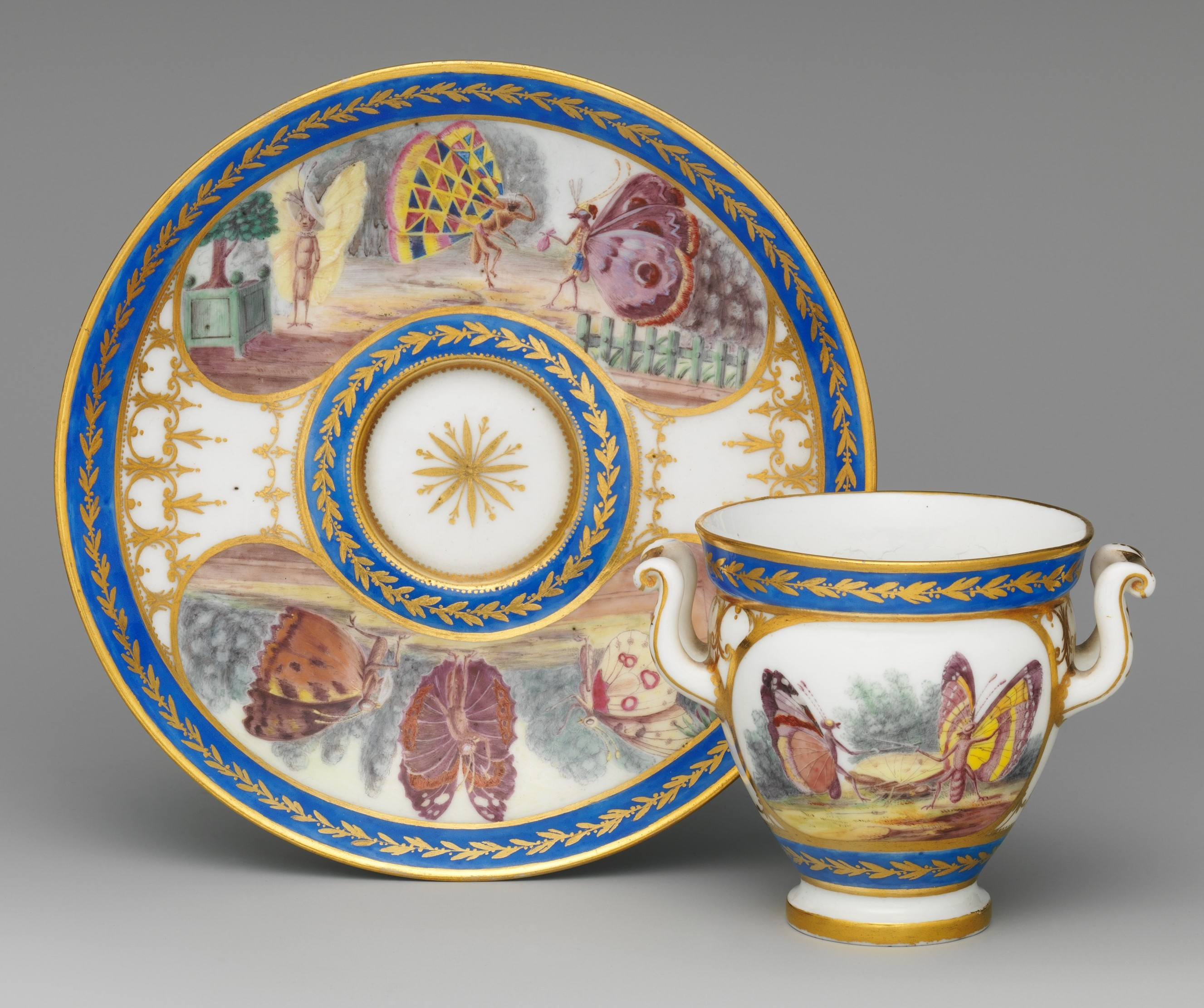
Sèvres cup in the "Etruscan" shape, with anthropomorphic butterflies in the style of Charles Germain de Saint Aubin, painted by Étienne-Gabriel Girard, 1794

The early continental European porcelain factories relied heavily on making large and enormously expensive services for those in the court circle; England, where there was little if any investment by the court, was a partial exception. From around 1760 the growing prosperity of the bourgeoisie made increasing numbers able to afford smaller scale purchases of top-quality porcelain, and numbers of collectors emerged. The china cabinet already existed by the late 17th century, initially used for Japanese export porcelain and its Chinese equivalent. Cabinet pieces catered to this market, but were also bought as extra pieces by the very wealthy. For example a long note of an order placed with Derby in 1791 by George IV when Prince of Wales, includes "A Cab[inet] Cup to match that left with gold sprigs" and another pair whose design is described, as well as "A Plate same as his Cab. cups...".

Cabinet pieces were expensive. In 1771 "Two curious antique beakers of the fine mazarin blue ground, elegantly painted, the triumph of Bacchus, highly finish'd with burnished and chased gold" were auctioned for £21, while a 49 piece tea and coffee service fetched £7. 7s.. Dr. Johnson, who his biographer James Boswell said complained that porcelain was as expensive as silver, seems to have got something of a bargain in the early 1780s when he bought what the auction catalogue described as "A superb and elegant cabinet cup and saucer enamell'd in compartments with landscapes, fine ultramarine blue ground finished with chased and burnished gold" for £1. 18 shillings, but this was more than twice what he paid for "A beautiful large punch bowl enamell'd with groups of coloured flowers..." (18 s). These were Chelsea or Derby pieces bought when both factories were owned by William Duesbury and sold together.

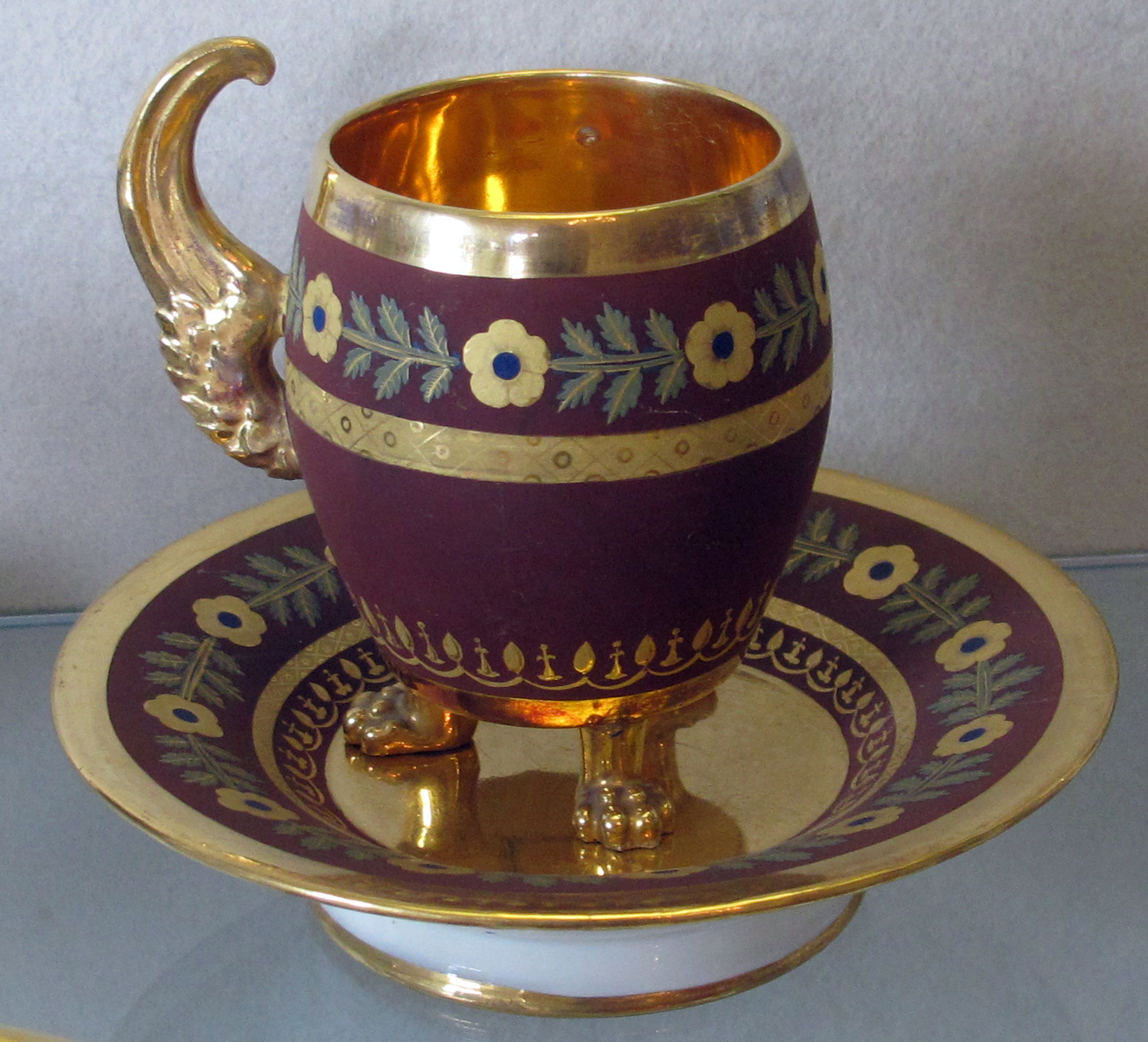
Worcester, c. 1770, an early example of a fancy Neoclassical shape

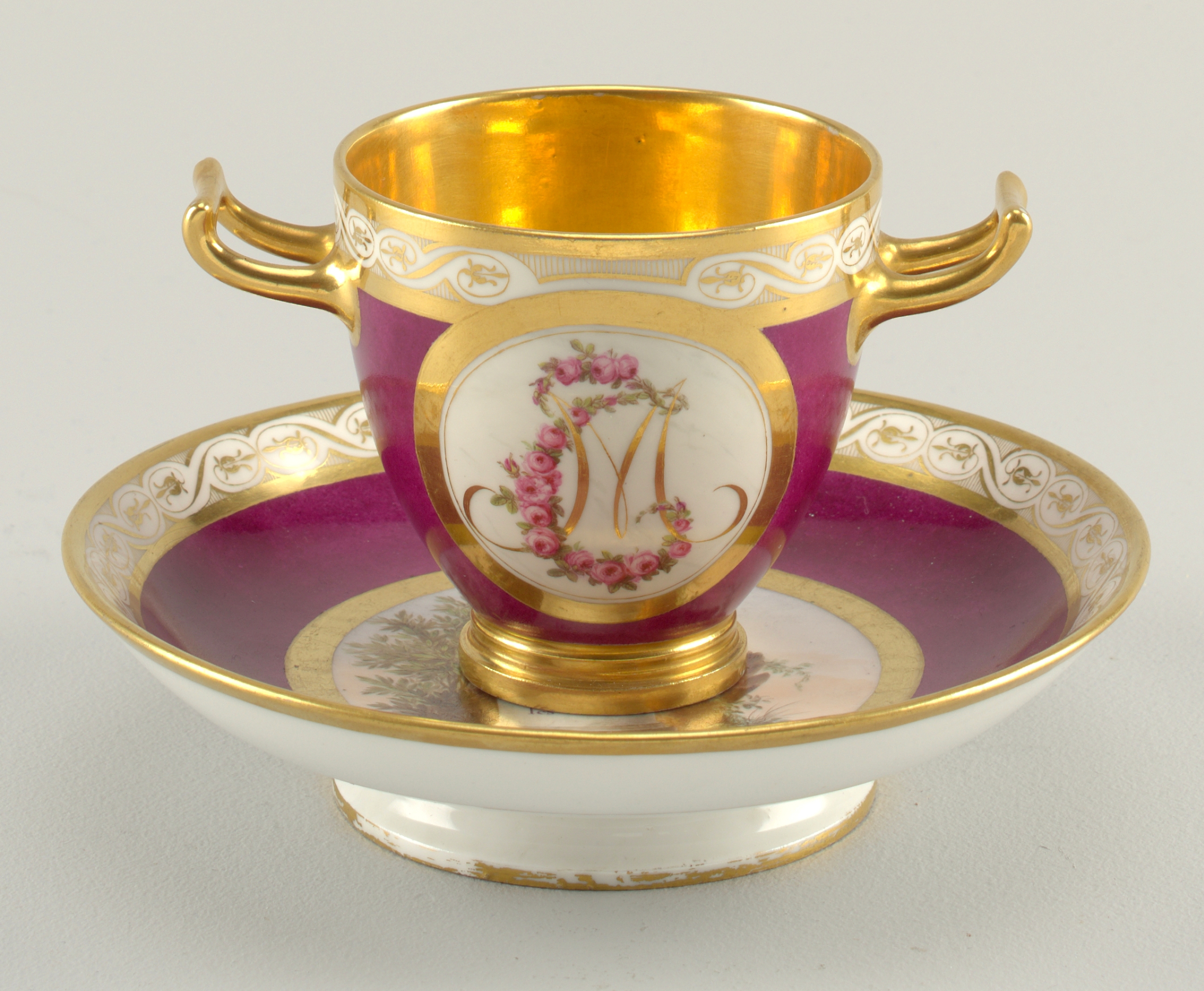
Sèvres cup with "M" monogram, 1798–1802, the saucer inscribed "Nettie a son amie Thim".

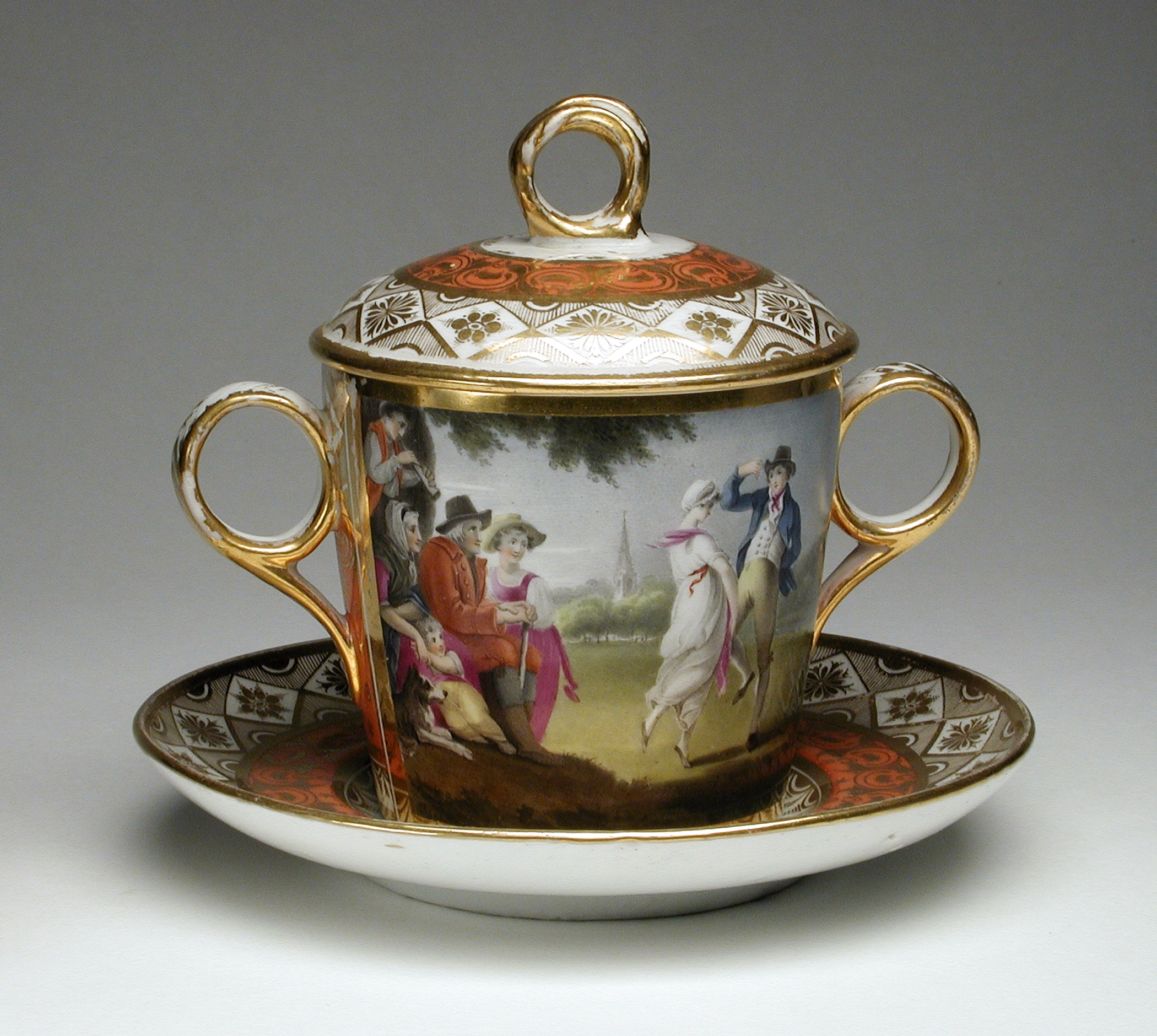
Chamberlain's factory, Worcester, c. 1805. Two-handled cup with cover, so a caudle cup type, with pastoral scene.

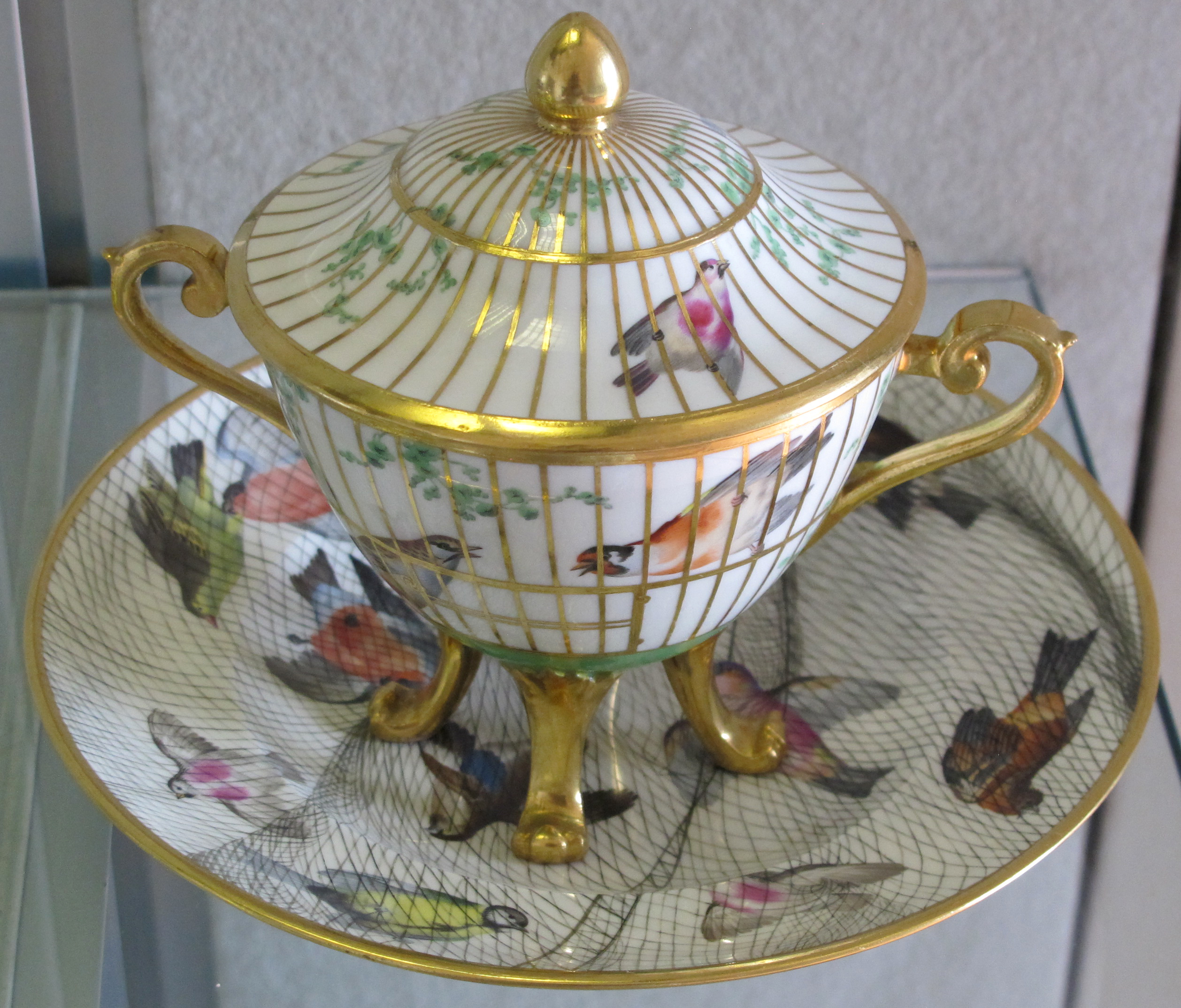
Vienna cup with cover, birds in nets and cages.
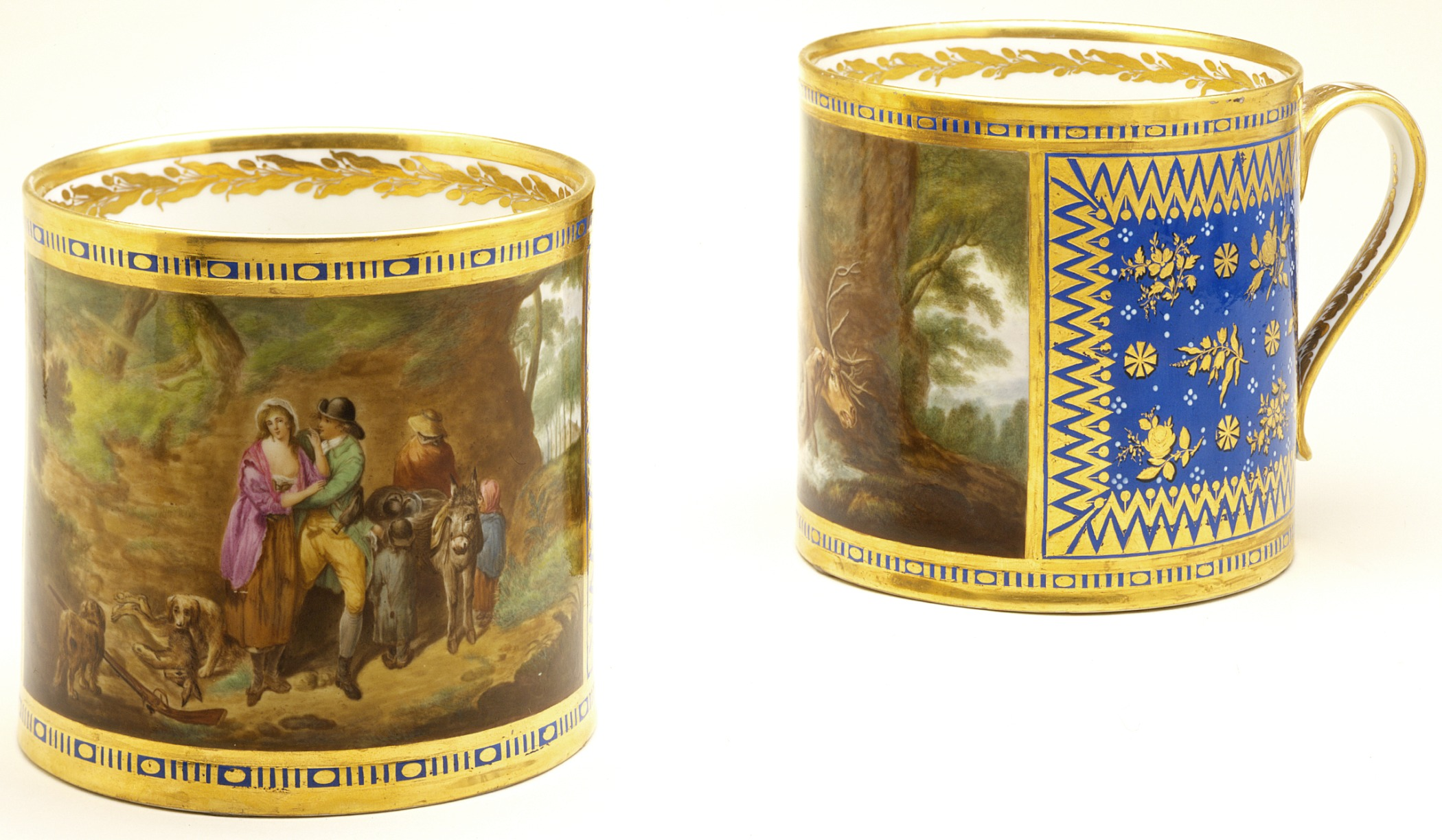
Pair of Derby mugs, c. 1810

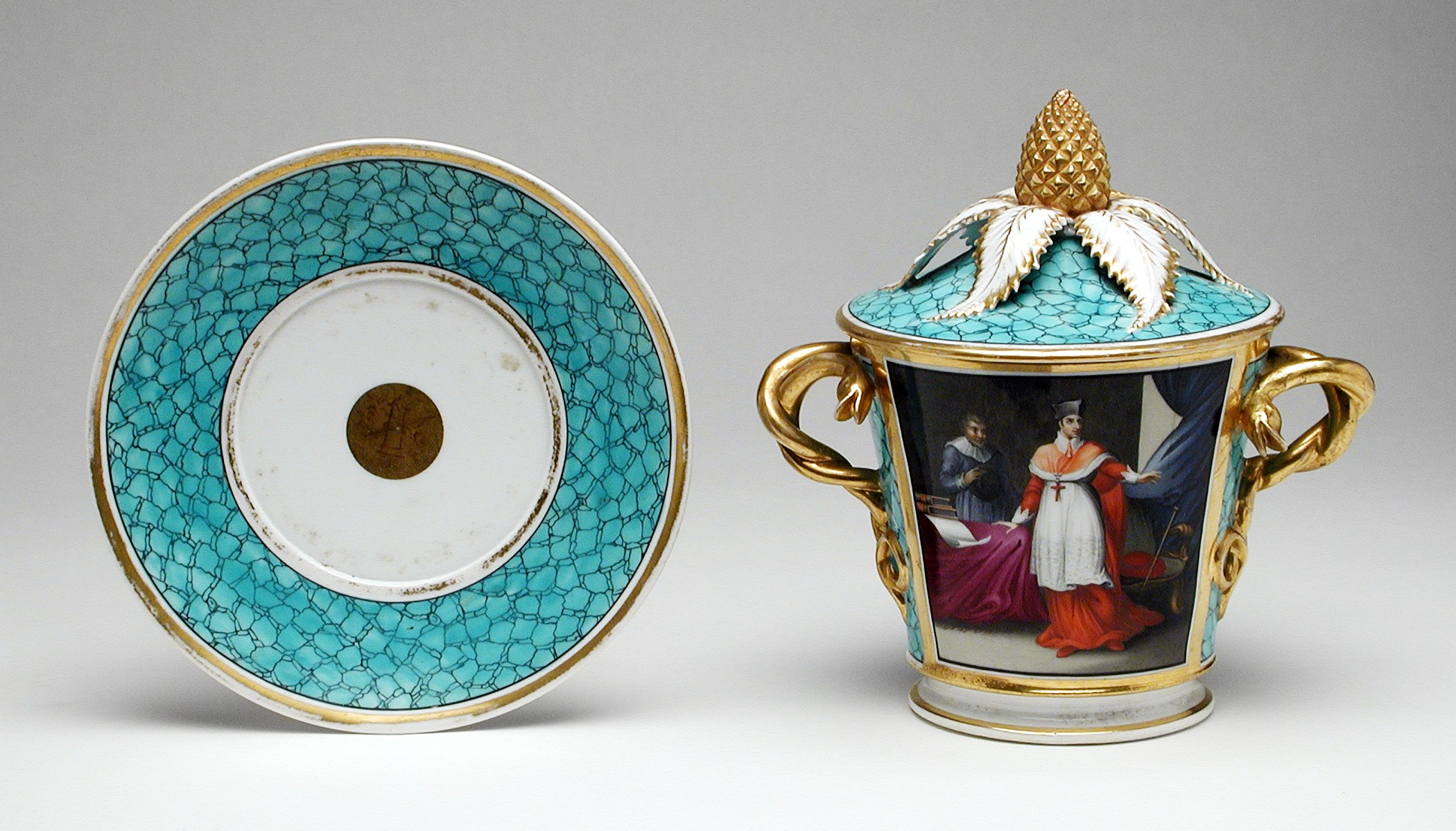
Worcester, Chamberlain's Factory, 1807-11, with cover.

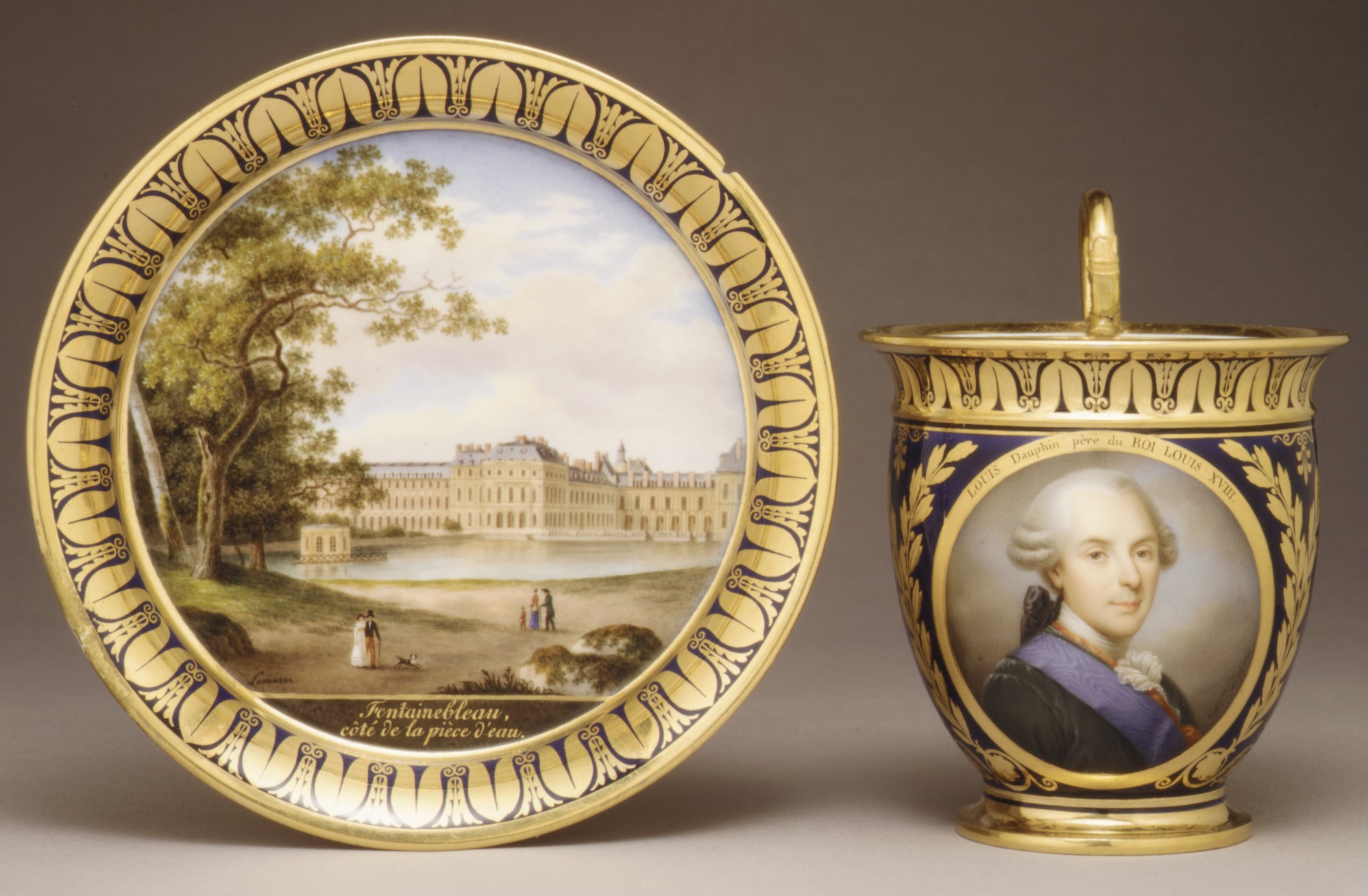
Sèvres cup with portrait of Louis XVIII's father, saucer with the Palace of Fontainebleau, 1822–23

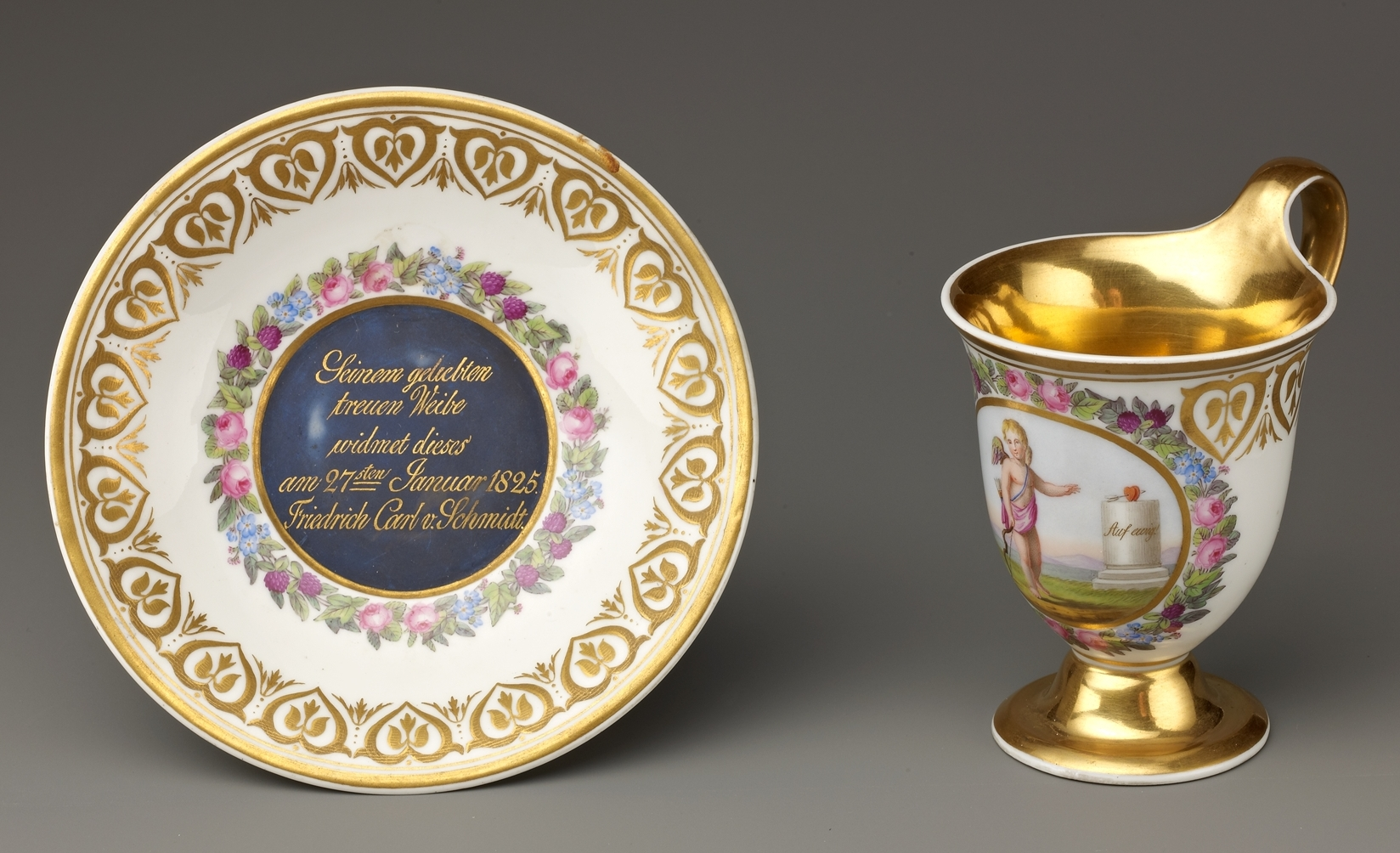
Berlin, recording a 25th wedding anniversary in 1825.
