= Welsh dresser =

Type of furniture with display shelves

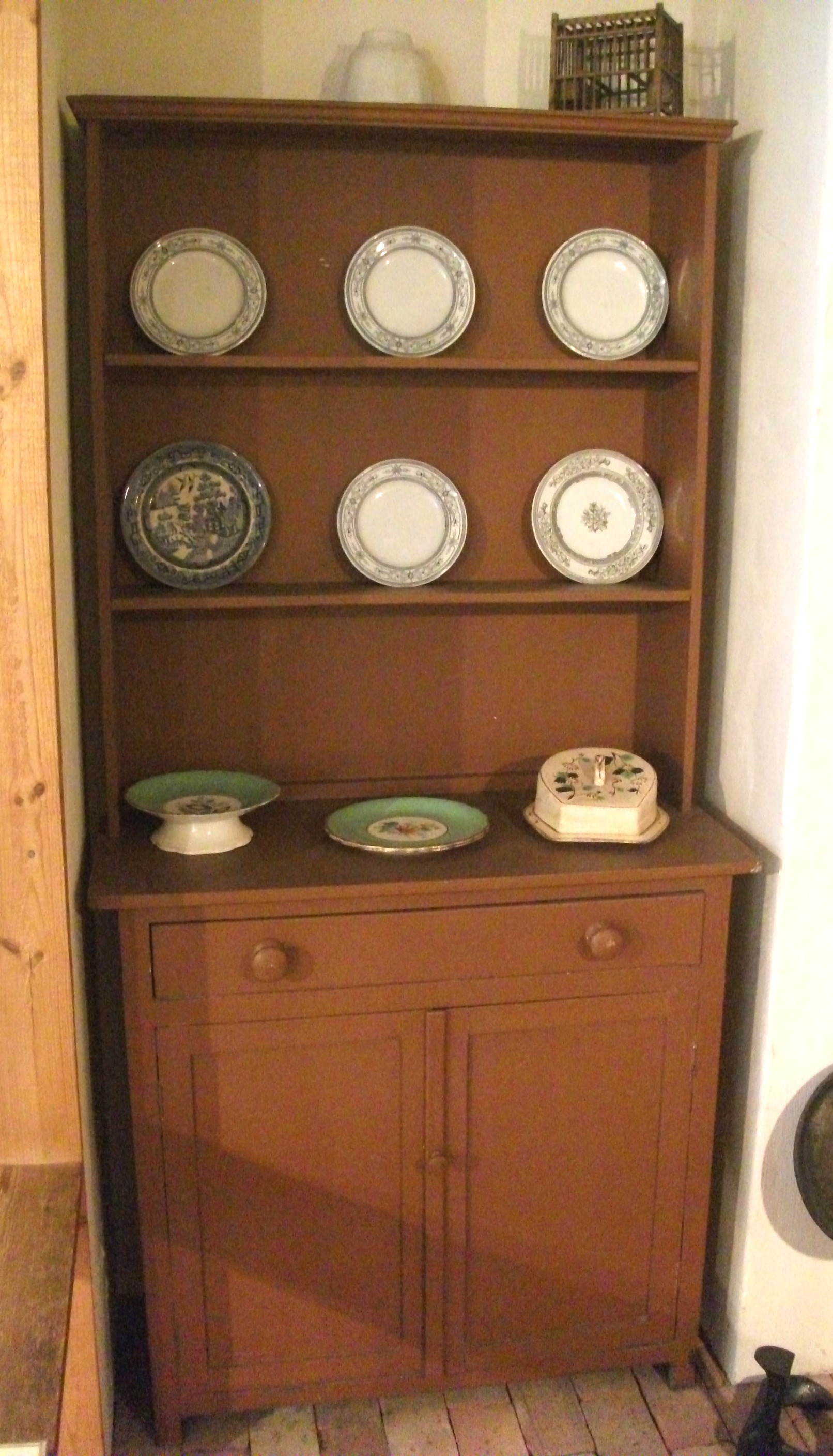
A Welsh dresser on display in Bedford Museum

A Welsh dresser, sometimes known as a kitchen dresser, pewter cupboard or china hutch, is a piece of wooden furniture consisting of drawers and cupboards in the lower part, with shelves and perhaps a sideboard on top. Traditionally, it is a utilitarian piece of furniture used to store and display crockery, silverware and pewter-ware, but is also used to display general ornaments.

== Description ==
A Welsh dresser is a piece of wooden furniture consisting of drawers and cupboards in the lower part, with shelves and perhaps a sideboard on top. Traditionally, it is a utilitarian piece of furniture used to store and display crockery, silverware and pewter-ware, but is also used to display general ornaments.

== History ==
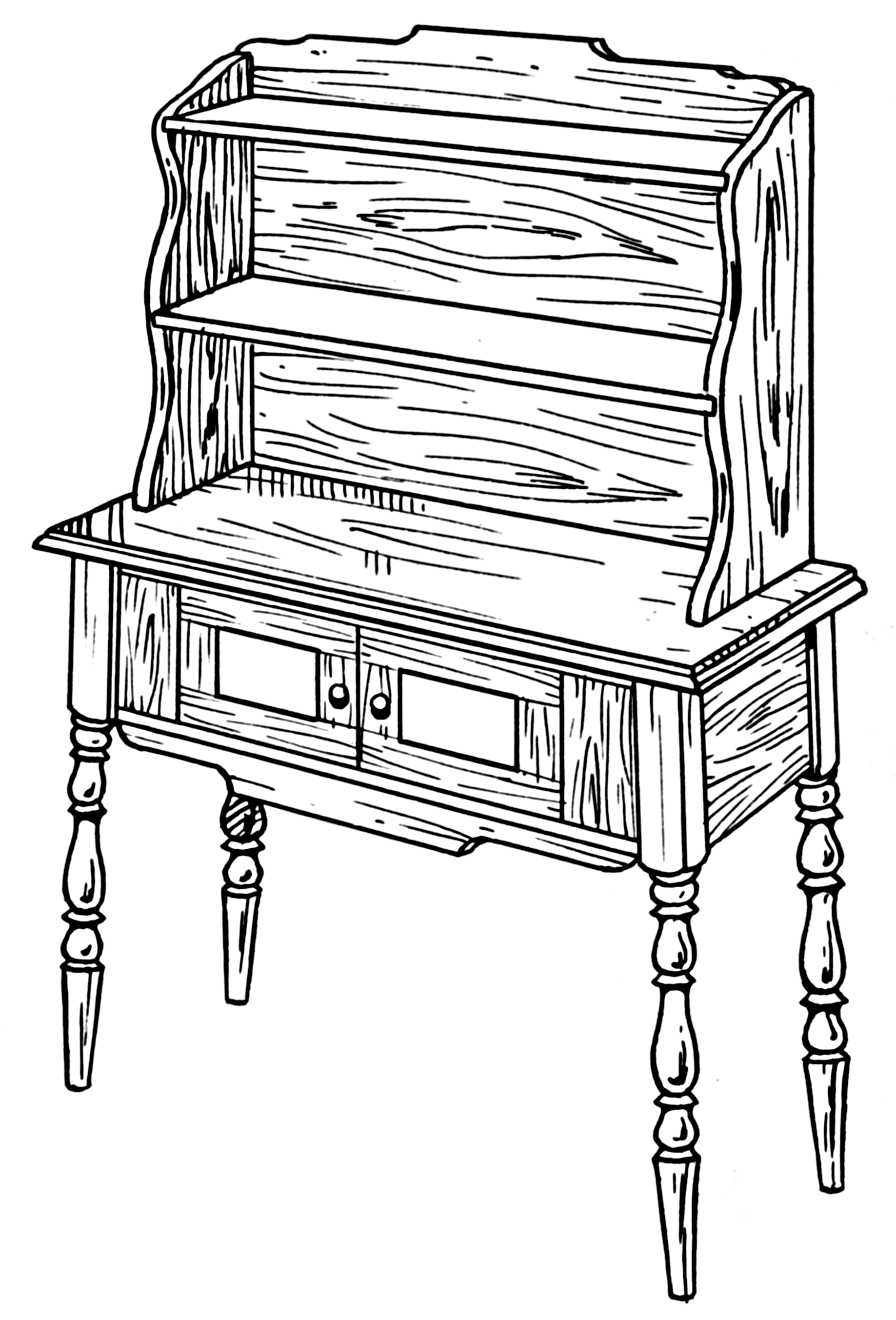
A plain Welsh dresser

Originally, a dresser was located in the kitchen and was a utilitarian piece of furniture where meat and other food was dressed or prepared, while prepared food was placed on sideboards in the dining room ready to be served. They could be modified to suit local needs; for example, dressers in the Scottish Highlands may have a "porridge drawer"—a tin-lined drawer into which freshly made porridge was emptied and left to cool. When cold, slices of the porridge could be cut out and taken out of the house for later consumption.

Gradually, the purely utilitarian function of the dresser was supplemented with other functions, such as a means of displaying the best crockery in a farmhouse. Once it became a means of display, the dresser could also be found in dining rooms where it served as sideboard and a place to store and display dinner ware. In the 19th century, various different styles of ceramics would evolve to fill the plate racks of the Welsh dressers of Wales and to meet the needs of the Welsh market. Furthermore, many local traditions of what constitutes the proper care and display of the items on a Welsh dresser would come to assume an important role in the culture of North Wales in particular.

== See also ==
- Irish dresser
- Chest of drawers
- Hoosier cabinet
- Hutch (furniture)
- Sideboard
