= Strozzi Palace =

Strozzi Palace may refer to:

- Palais Strozzi in Vienna, Austria
- Palazzo Strozzi in Florence, Italy
