= J. Stephen Lansing =

American anthropologist and complexity scientist

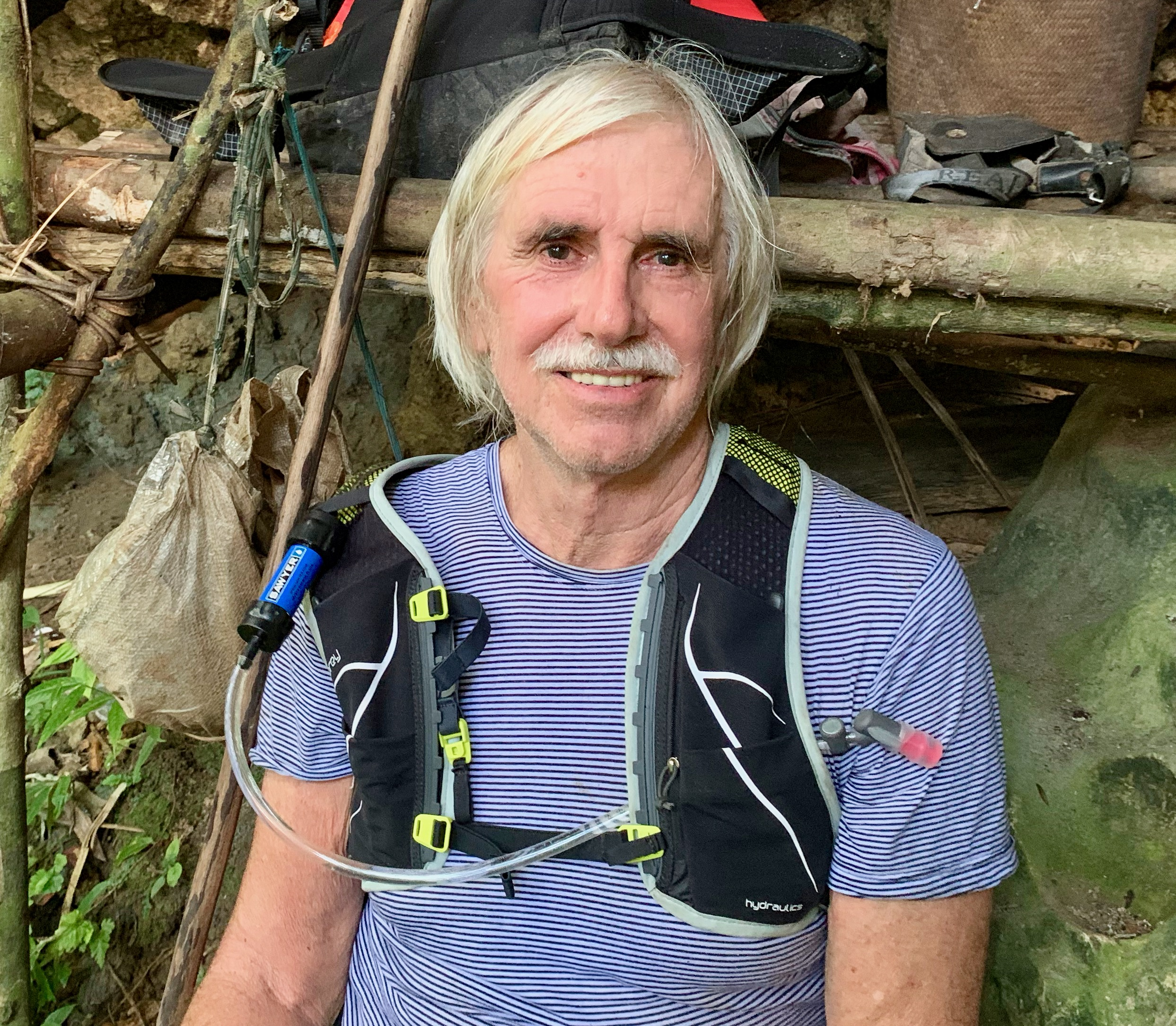
Steve Lansing in Borneo, 2018

J. Stephen Lansing (born 1950) is an American anthropologist and complexity scientist. He is especially known from his decades of research on the emergent properties of human-environmental interactions in Bali, Borneo and the Malay Archipelago; social-ecological modeling, and complex adaptive systems. He is an external professor at the Santa Fe Institute and the Complexity Science Hub Vienna; a Fellow at the Center for Advanced Study in the Behavioral Sciences at Stanford; a visiting scholar at the Hoffman Global Institute for Business and Society at INSEAD Singapore, and emeritus professor of anthropology at the University of Arizona.

== Career ==
Lansing obtained his BA with highest honors at Wesleyan University in 1972, following a year at the Wesleyan Honors College studying with Jürgen Habermas. He was a doctoral fellow at the Institute for Advanced Study in Princeton, New Jersey in 1976 and received his doctorate in anthropology from University of Michigan in 1977.

After graduation, in 1977 Lansing began his professional career at the University of Southern California as assistant professor. He became associate professor in 1983 and professor in anthropology from 1990 to 1996. From 1987 to 1992 he also chaired the Department of Anthropology. From 1995 to 1998 he was professor of anthropology and professor at the School of Natural Resources and Environment at the University of Michigan. In 1998 he moved to the University of Arizona, where he was appointed professor of anthropology, and from 2002 also professor of ecology and evolutionary biology. From 2015 to 2019, he was founding director of the Complexity Institute and professor in the Asian School of Environment at Nanyang Technological University in Singapore.

Since 1999, Lansing has participated at the Santa Fe Institute, first as external professor, from 2002 to 2007 as professor, and since 2007 as external professor. In 2008, he became a senior research fellow at the Stockholm Resilience Centre at the Stockholm University. In 2017, he joined the Complexity Science Hub Vienna as an external professor.

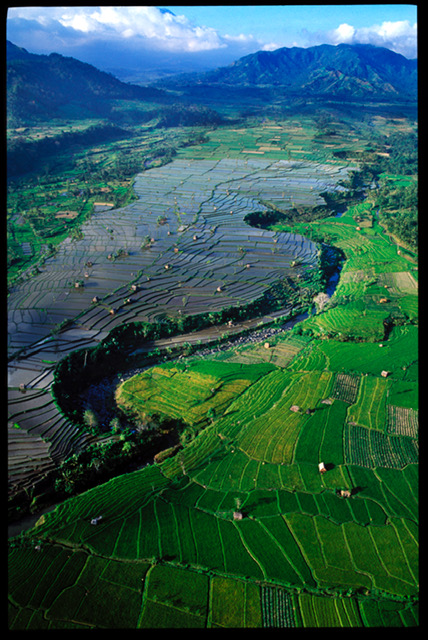
Precise management of irrigation by Balinese subaks

== Research ==
In the 1980s, Lansing and ecologist James Kremer showed that Balinese water temple networks can self-organize, and that over the centuries, water temple networks expanded to manage the ecology of rice terraces at the scale of whole watersheds. In 2012, Bali's water temple networks were recognized as a UNESCO World Heritage Site. In 2017, Lansing and colleagues showed that the self-organization of the water temple networks is not an historical accident, but an emergent property of a self-governing system of environmental management. This was confirmed in 2025 with new remote sensing data in the European Journal of Remote Sensing. In 2019, the story of the water temple research ("Priests and Progammers") was the focus of an exhibition by a team of architects, artists and researchers from ETH Zurich at the Sharjah Architecture Triennial, revised for the Venice Biennale Architecture 2025. Lansing's analysis of adaptive self-organized criticality is now being used to seek a 70% reduction in greenhouse gas emissions from Balinese rice terraces.

As the pieces of the water temple story were falling into place, Lansing became interested in self-organizing processes elsewhere in the archipelago. In 2000, he began to work with Indonesian medical researchers, linguists and public health officials to study the co-evolution of social structure, language change and disease resistance on 17 islands in the Malay archipelago. Combining fine-grained linguistic, genetic and kinship information revealed historical patterns of gene expression, social interaction and language change on a scale of time and space that had not previously been observed. The story is told in Islands of Order: A Guide to Complexity Modeling for the Social Sciences (Princeton University Press 2019 and companion website).

In May 2018 Lansing led a team that discovered a group of cave-dwelling hunter-gatherers in Indonesian Borneo, and a year later began working with the Leakey Foundation and the Nature Conservancy to help the Cave Punan preserve their forests. More than half of Borneo's forest cover is already gone, and at current rates of deforestation the remaining lowland forests (and with them a large share of the Earth's terrestrial biodiversity) will be lost well before the end of the century. In 2022, with support from the Leakey Foundation and the Indonesian affiliate of the Nature Conservancy, the Regency of Bulungan declared their full support for the right of the Cave Punan to their forests as their ancestral heritage. Like the farmers of Bali, the Cave Punan manage their relationship to the natural environment by consensus. Lansing's current research explores how the dynamics of these centuries-old systems of adaptive governance may be relevant to the as-yet-unmanaged global commons.

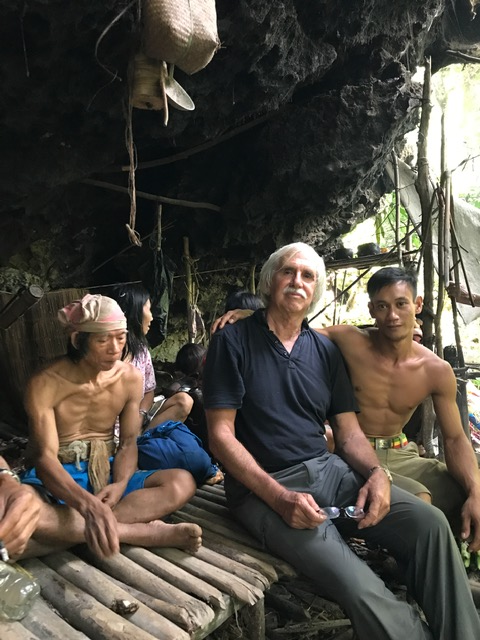
Lansing with Punan Batu at a rock shelter in Borneo

== Selected publications ==
Books:

- Lansing, J. Stephen. Priests and programmers: technologies of power in the engineered landscape of Bali. Princeton University Press, 2009.
- Lansing, J. Stephen. Perfect order: Recognizing complexity in Bali. Princeton University Press, 2012.
- Lansing, J. Stephen and Murray P. Cox. Islands of Order: A Guide to Complexity Modeling for the Social Sciences. Princeton University Press, 2019.

Selected articles:

- Lansing, J. Stephen, and James N. Kremer. "Emergent properties of Balinese water temple networks: coadaptation on a rugged fitness landscape." Foundational Papers in Complexity Science, ed. David Krakauer. Santa Fe Institute Press, in press. Original: American Anthropologist (1993): 97–114.
- Lansing, J. Stephen, Vanda Gerhart, James N. Kremer, Patricia Kremer, Alit Arthawiguna, Suprapto, Ida Bagus Suryawan, I Gusti Arsana, Vernon L.Scarborough and Kimberly Mikita. 2001. "Volcanic Fertilization of Balinese Rice Paddies", Ecological Economics 38 (2001):383-390.
- Lansing, J. Stephen. "Complex adaptive systems." Annual review of anthropology (2003): 183–204.
- Lansing, J. Stephen and Karyn Fox. 2011. Niche construction on Bali: the gods of the countryside. Phil. Trans. R. Soc. B 2011 366, 927-934.
- Lansing, J. S., Cox, M. P., Downey, S. S., Janssen, M. A., & Schoenfelder, J. W. (2009). "A robust budding model of Balinese water temple networks." World Archaeology, 41(1), 112–133.
- Lansing, J. Stephen, et al. 2017. "Adaptive self-organization of Bali's ancient rice terraces." PNAS 114 (25): 6504–6509.
- Lansing J. Stephen et al. 2017. Kinship structures create persistent channels for language transmission. PNAS 114 (49): 12910–12915.
- Yérali Gandica, J. Stephen Lansing, Ning Ning Chung, Stefan Thurner, Lock Yue Chew. 2021. Bali's ancient rice terraces: A Hamiltonian approach. 10.1103/PhysRevLett.127.168301
- Lansing, J. S., Chung, N. N., Chew, L. Y., & Jacobs, G. S. 2021. Averting Evolutionary Suicide from the Tragedy of the Commons. International Journal of the Commons, 15(1), pp. 414–430. DOI: https://doi.org/10.5334/ijc.1118
- Lansing, J., Jacobs, G., Downey, S., Norquest, P., Cox, M., Kuhn, S., . . . Kusuma, P. (2022). Deep ancestry of collapsing networks of nomadic hunter–gatherers in Borneo. Evolutionary Human Sciences, 4, E9. doi:10.1017/ehs.2022.3
- Lansing, J., J.N. Kremer, I.B.G. Suryawan, S. Satiakumar, G.S. Jacobs, N. N. Chung, I.W. A. Arthawiguna. 2023. Adaptive irrigation management by Balinese farmers reduces greenhouse gas emissions and increases rice yields. 2023. Phil.Trans.Roy.Soc.B.,378:1889.https://doi.org/10.1098/rstb.2022.0400
