= Banco Francês e Italiano Building =

- Edifício do Banco Francês e Italiano
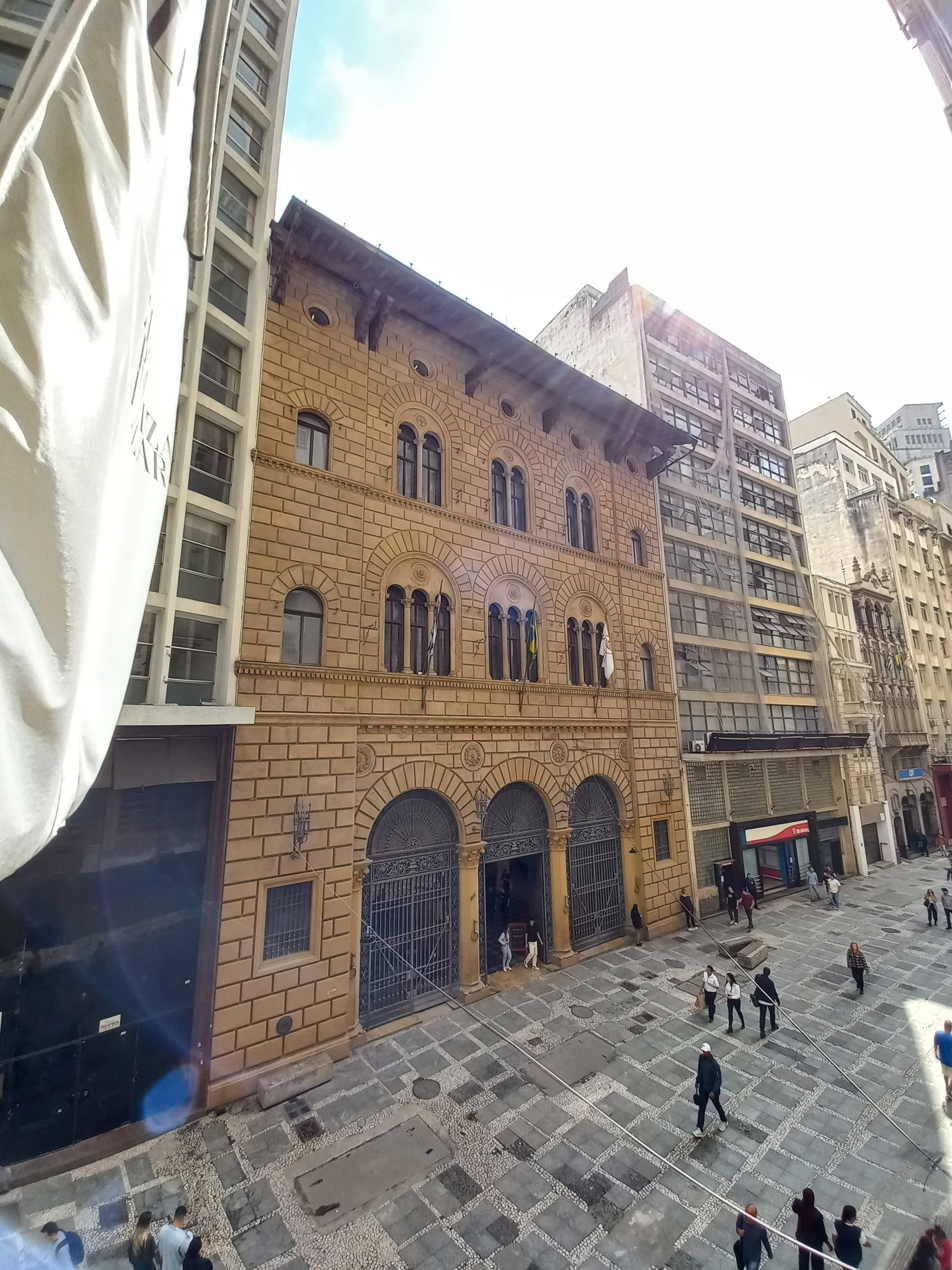
- The Banco Francês e Italiano Building in 2023
- Click on the map for a fullscreen view

General information
- Location: São Paulo, Brazil
- Coordinates: 23°32′49.59″S 46°38′03.84″W

The Banco Francês e Italiano Building (Portuguese: Edifício do Banco Francês e Italiano; Italian: Edificio della Banca Francese e Italiana per l'America del Sud) is a historic building located in São Paulo, Brazil.

== History ==
The building, designed by Italian architect Giulio Micheli, was constructed starting in 1919 to serve as the new São Paulo headquarters of the Banca Francese e Italiana per l'America del Sud, replacing the previous, smaller branch located on the same site. After Micheli's death, the work was completed by his collaborator Giuseppe Chiappori. The building was officially inaugurated on 19 November 1921 in the presence of Governor Washington Luís and the Italian ambassador Luigi Mercatelli.

== Description ==
The building is located on Rua 15 de Novembro in downtown São Paulo. It features a Florentine Renaissance Revival architecture, explicitly inspired by the forms of Palazzo Strozzi in Florence.
