= Thurner =

Thurner is a surname. Notable people with the surname include:

- Helene Thurner (born 1938), Austrian luger
- Stefan Thurner (born 1969), Austrian physicist and complexity researcher
- Wilfried Thurner (1927–1981), Austrian bobsledder
