= Palais Strozzi =

Palace in Vienna, Austria

Coordinates: 48°12′33″N 16°20′50″E

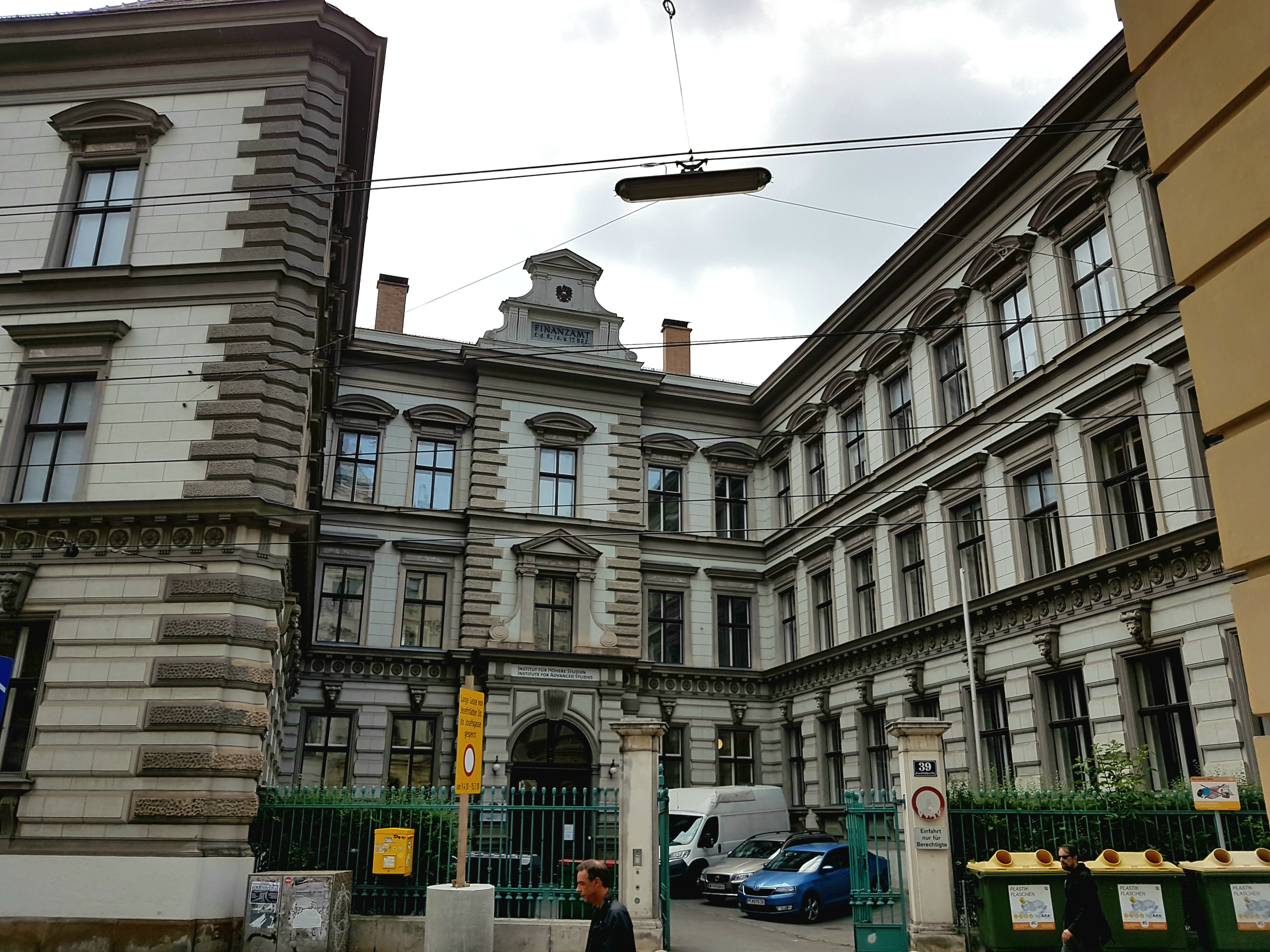

- Location within Vienna
- Location: Josefstadt, Vienna, Austria

History
- Built: 1699-1702
- Built for: Countess Maria Katharina Strozzi

Palais Strozzi is a palace in Vienna, Austria. It was owned by the Strozzi family.

The palace is located in the VIII. district of Vienna Josefstadt, was built between 1699 and 1702 for Countess Maria Katharina Strozzi, née Khevenhüller.

Today the finance offices for the VIII., XVI. and XVII. districts are located there.

== Building history ==
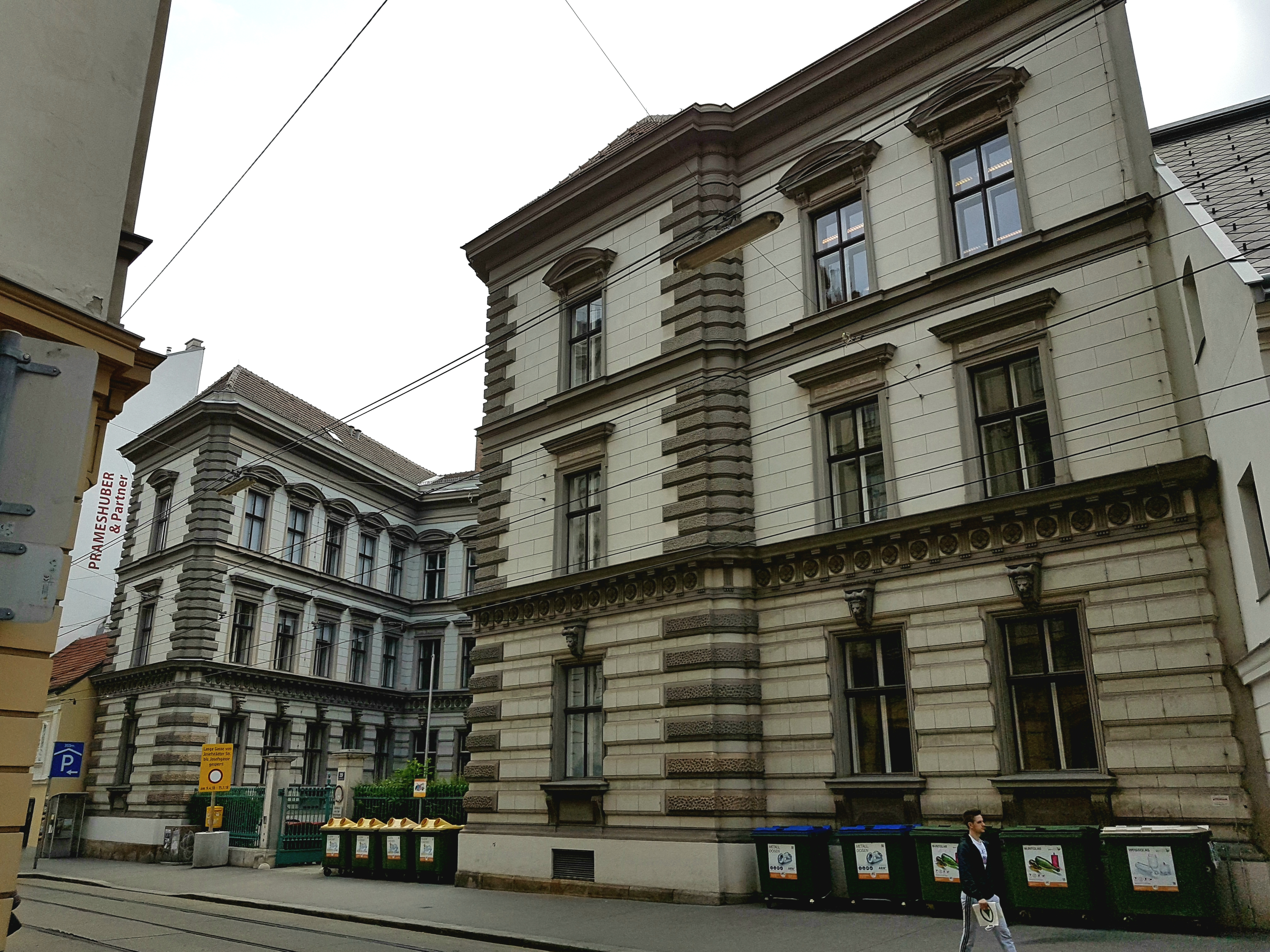
Palais Strozzi, side view.

Countess Maria Katharina Strozzi originally had a modest summer residence built, which initially only consisted of the one-storey main wing of today's palace. The elaborately designed garden of the Countess, on the other hand, reached as far as Piaristengasse. The architect of the original building is not known, but could have come from the circle of Johann Lukas von Hildebrandt.

After the Countess' death in 1714, her nephew Colonel Johann Ludwig Graf Khevenhüller inherited the property, which he sold to the Archbishop of Valencia, Antonio Francesco Folco de Cardona, two years later. He had the summer palace extended by the side wings and the forecourt, which was separated from the street by a wall. Folco bequeathed the palace to Emperor Charles VI, whose advisor he had been.

His daughter, Empress Maria Theresa, gave the palace to her court chancellor, Johann Graf Chotek, in 1753. Expansion plans and the Seven Years' War forced him to sell large parts of the garden.

The palace remained in the family until 1840, but was partly rented out, for example to the painter Friedrich von Amerling. When the cholera pandemic reached Vienna in 1831, the palace served as a cholera hospital. In 1840 the state bought the building and set up the k.k. Civil-Mädchen-Pensionat Wien, a college for women teachers. As the building became too small for the new use, the building was enlarged and given a completely new look. The college was separated from the cavalry barracks opposite at that time by a new wing in 1877/1878.

In 1919 the college moved out. The palace was now used by the Municipality of Vienna for the care of the disabled. From 1940 to December 7, 2012, the building housed the tax office for districts 8, 16 and 17 in Vienna until it was moved to the financial center Wien Mitte. In February 2015 it was announced that the Institute for Advanced Studies (IHS) would move to the Palais, and in November 2015 the IHS Research Center was opened in the Palais. The Complexity Science Hub Vienna, which opened in May 2016, is also based in Palais Strozzi.

== See also ==
- Palazzo Strozzi in Florence
