= Perfect Order =

Book by J. Stephen Lansing

Perfect Order: Recognizing Complexity in Bali
- Author: J. Stephen Lansing
- Genre: Non-fiction
- Publication date: 2006

Perfect Order: Recognizing Complexity in Bali is a 2006 book by anthropologist J. Stephen Lansing about Balinese culture. It focuses on the development of Balinese wet-rice agriculture over the last several hundred years, particularly the subak irrigation system. Lansing argues that the subak system came about through a process of self-organization characterized by complex interactions among the politics of local communities, growing conditions, the strict Balinese caste system and interacting religious structures.

== Reception ==
In 2007, Perfect Order won the Julian Steward Book Award from the Anthropology and Environment section of the American Anthropological Association. It is considered a work of interest to ecologists, archaeologists, and those who study Southeast Asia more generally. However, the book has been more contentious among some anthropologists of Bali, particularly because of Lansing's relative under-use of works in the anthropology of Bali since Clifford Geertz's 1980 book Negara: The Theatre State in Nineteenth-Century Bali.
