= Fondazione Palazzo Strozzi =

Cultural foundation in Italy

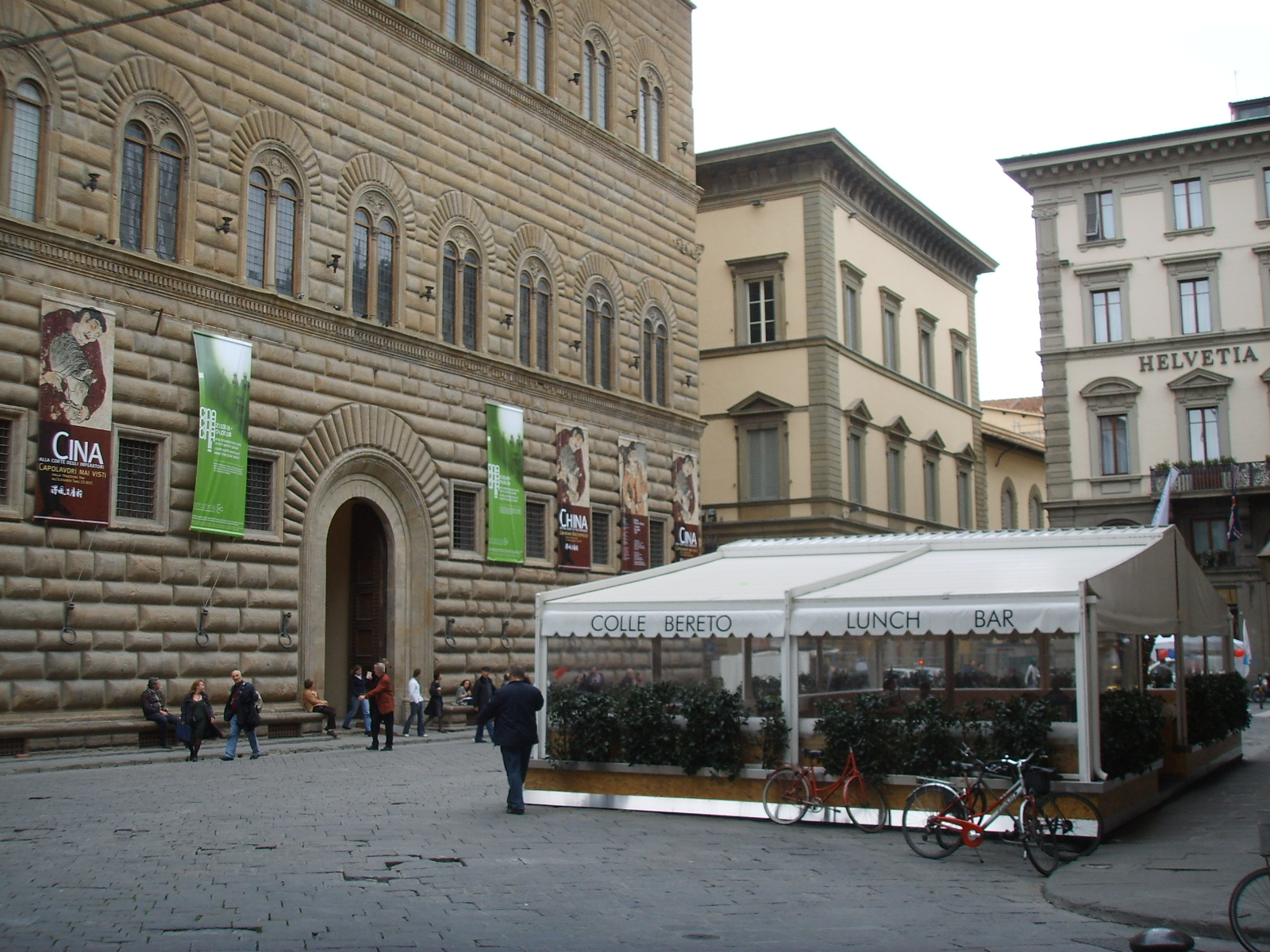
Palazzo Strozzi

The Fondazione Palazzo Strozzi (Foundation of the Palazzo Strozzi) is the first example of an independent public-private cultural foundation in Italy, established in 2006. Is a cultural organisation in the Palazzo Strozzi, Florence, Italy, that each year mounts exhibitions devoted to a different aspect of the arts, creating a dialogue between the old and the new.

The Fondazione Palazzo Strozzi in Florence is represented in the USA by the Palazzo Strozzi Foundation USA, a non profit organization based in New York member of the Circle of the Committee of the Partners of Palazzo Strozzi.

Fondazione Palazzo Strozzi aims to bring international art and cultural events to Florence, enhancing city life and supporting the local tourism industry. In 2023 alone, it is estimated that Palazzo Strozzi’s visitors contributed more than €70 million to the local economy. Since 2015, Arturo Galasino is director of Fondazione Palazzo Strozzi.

== Exhibitions (selection) ==
- Helen Frankenthaler. Painting Without Rules, 27 September 2024 - 26 January 2025.
- Tracey Emin. Sex and Solitude, 16 March - 20 July 2025.
- Fra Angelico, 26 September 2025 - 25 January 2026.
- Rothko in Florence, 14 March - 26 August 2026.
