= Ferro (architecture) =

Item of functional wrought-iron work in a façade

Ferro da facciata
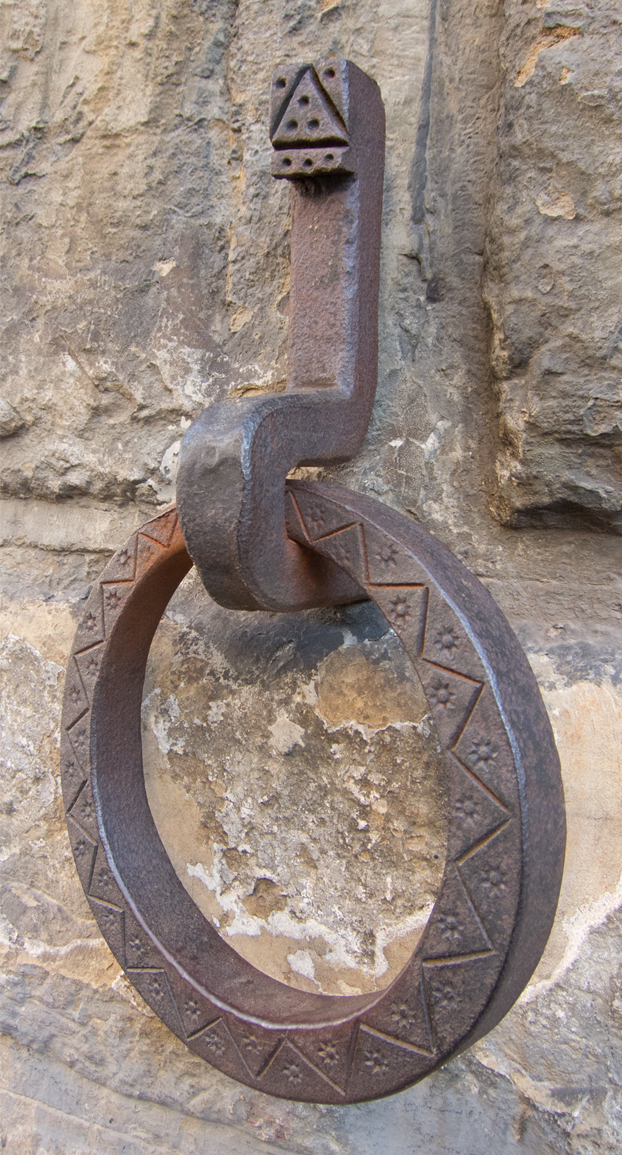
- Ferro in Piazza del Duomo, Florence
- Material: Wrought iron

A ferro (plural ferri) or ferro da facciata is an item of functional wrought-iron work on the façade of an Italian building. Ferri are a common feature of Medieval and Renaissance architecture in Lazio, Tuscany and Umbria. They are of three main types: ferri da cavallo have a ring for tethering horses, and are set at about 1.5 metres from the ground; holders for standards and torches are placed higher on the façade and on the corners of the building; arpioni have a cup-shaped hook or hooks to support cloth for shade or to be dried, and are set near balconies.

In Florence, ferri da cavallo and arpioni were often made to resemble the head of a lion, the symbolic marzocco of the Republic of Florence. Later, cats, dragons, horses and fantastic animals were also represented.

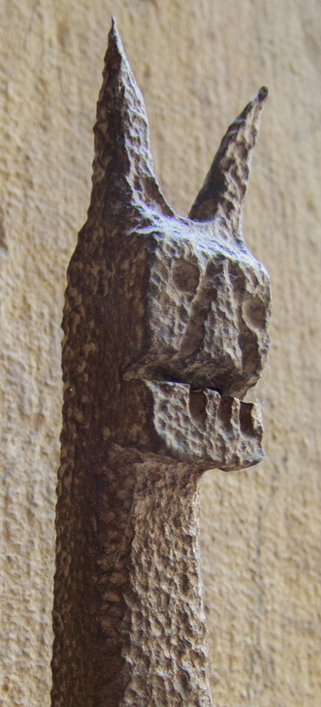
Bargello, Florence

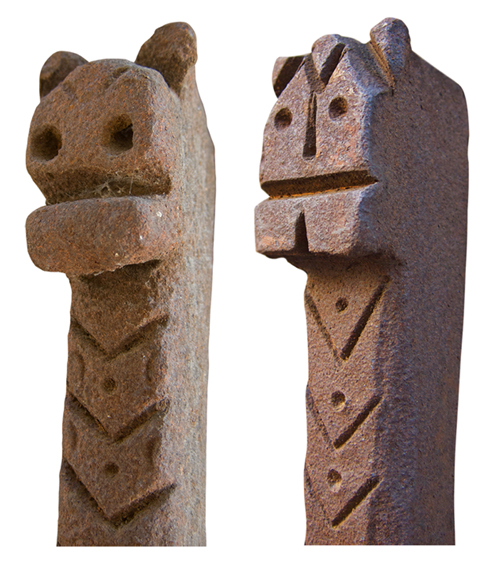
Ferro from two ages, Palazzo degli Altoviti, Florence

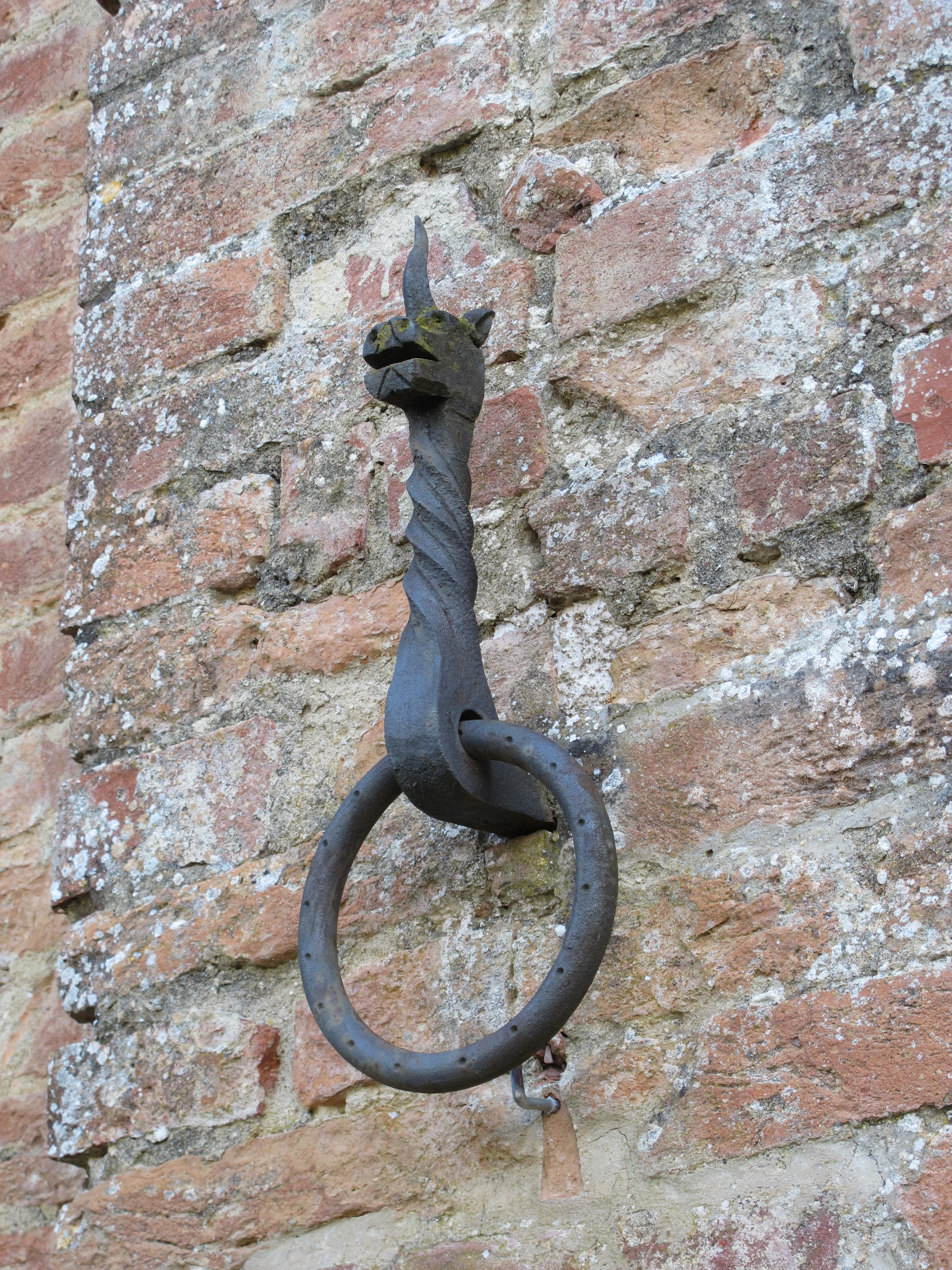
Castello di Montalto, Castelnuovo Berardenga, Siena

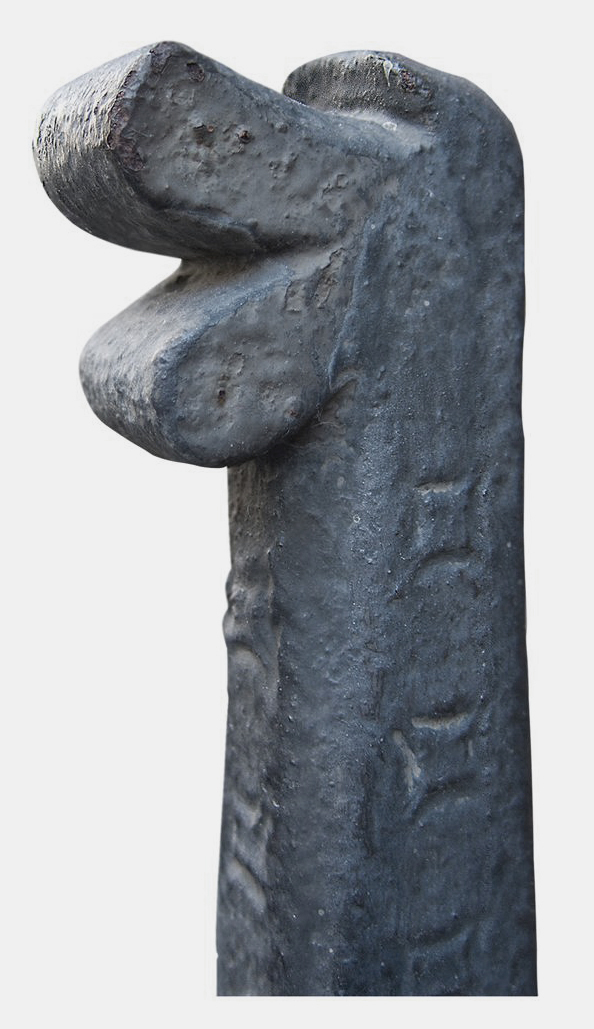
Palazzo Morozzi Dilaghi, Florence

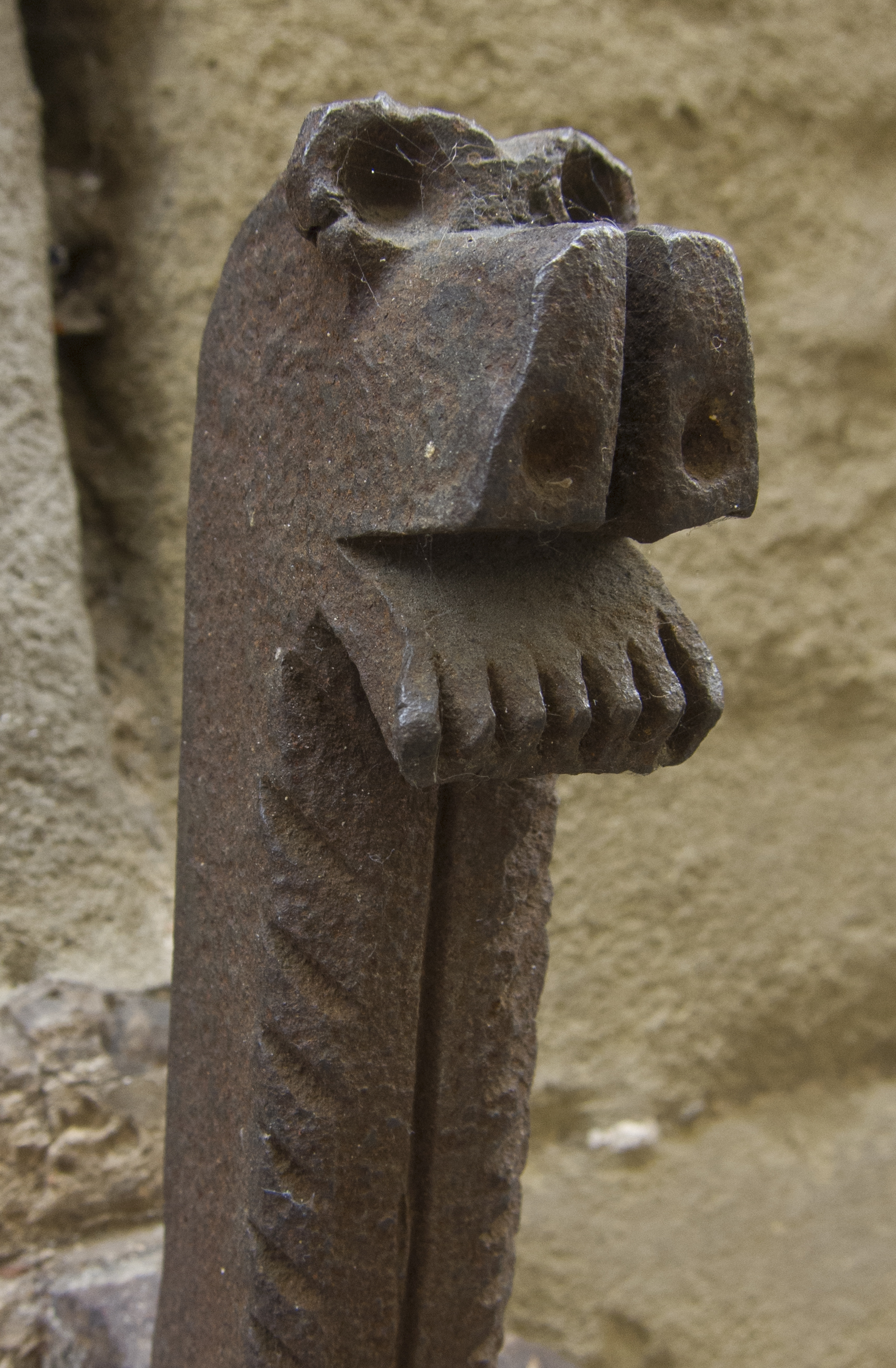
Ferro in Arezzo

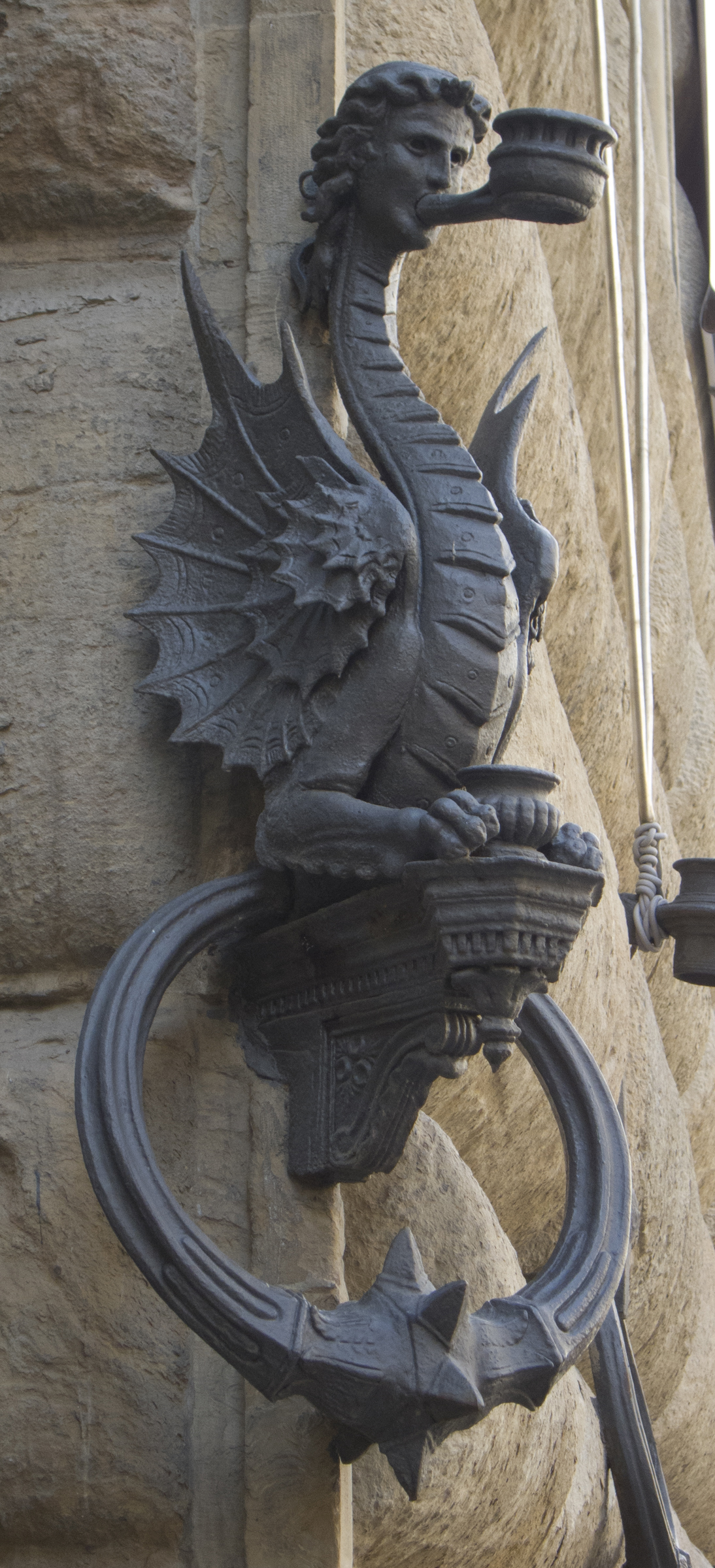
Niccolò Grosso - "Il Caparra" Palazzo Strozzi c.1500

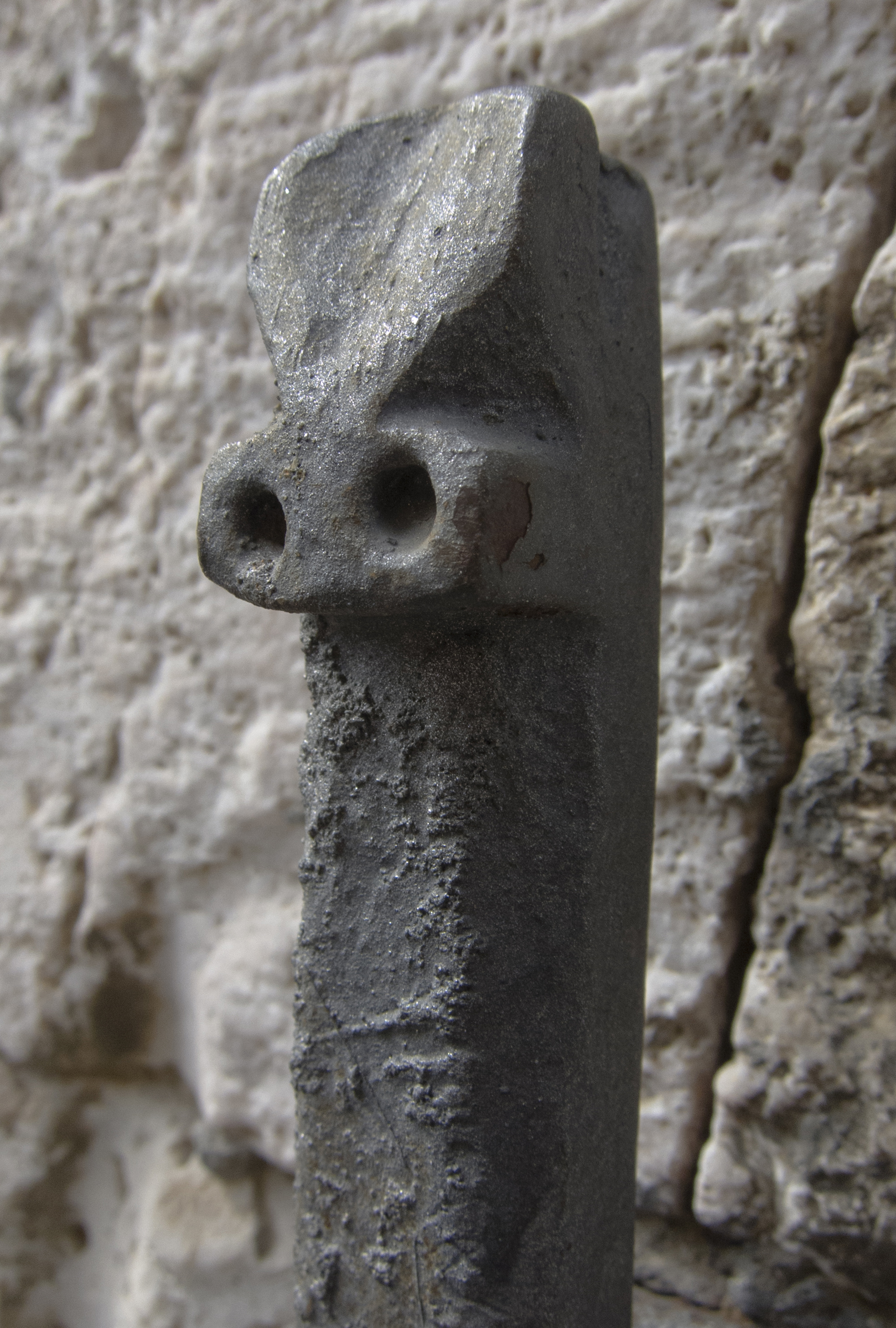
"Ferro" in Pisa, Italy
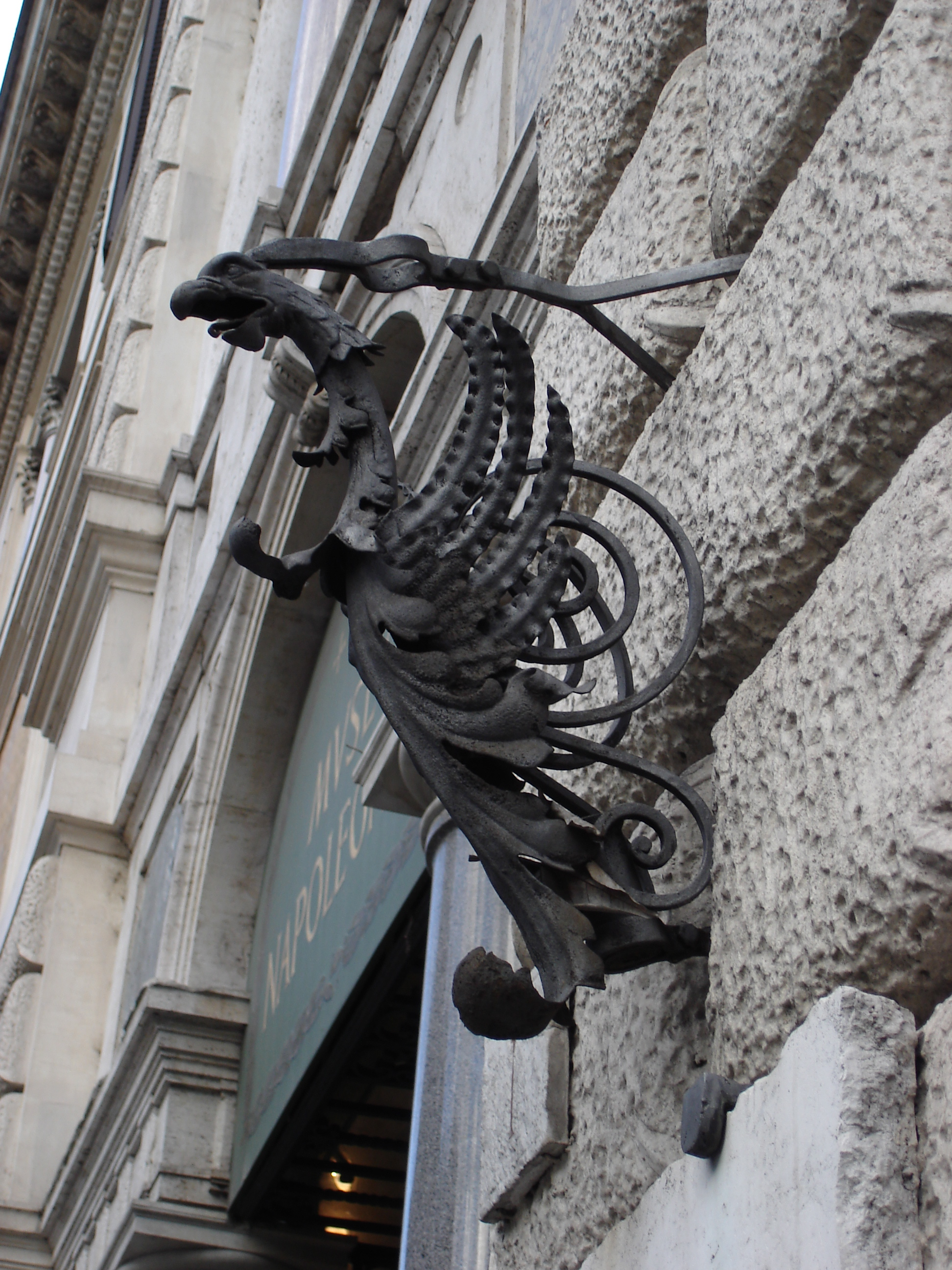
Standard-holder, Rome

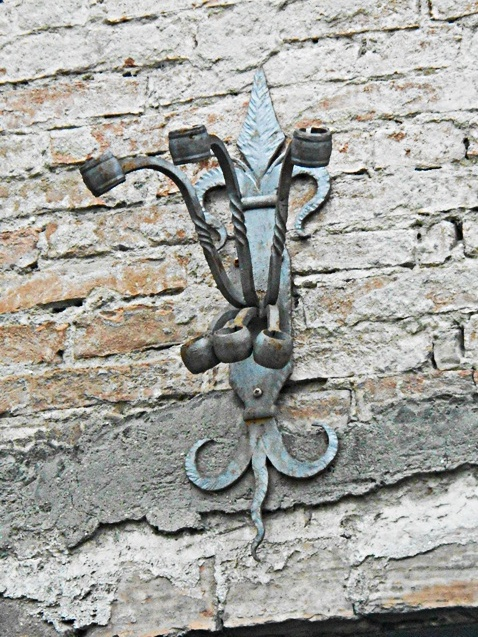
Standard-holder, Borgo San Lorenzo

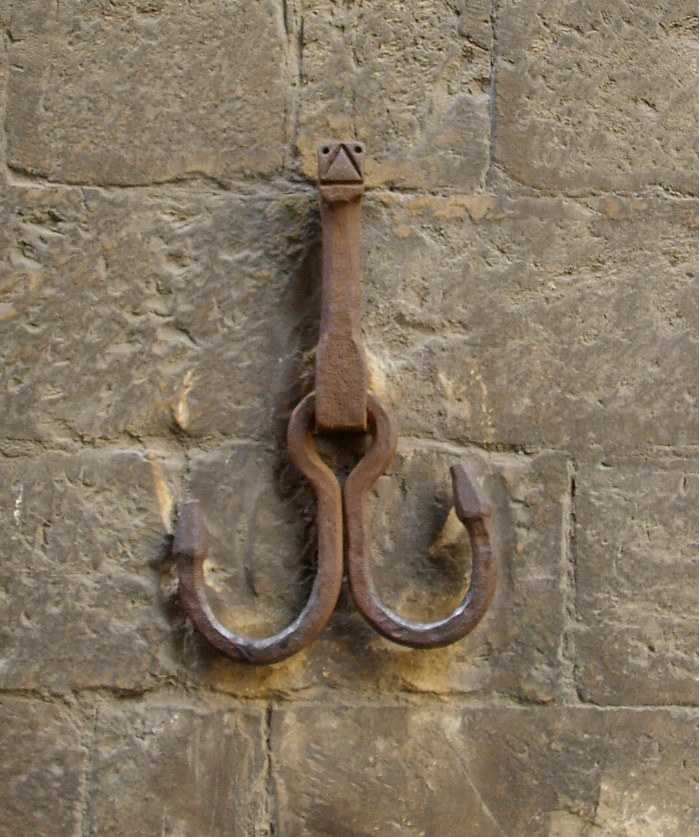
Arpione, Palazzo degli Altoviti, Florence

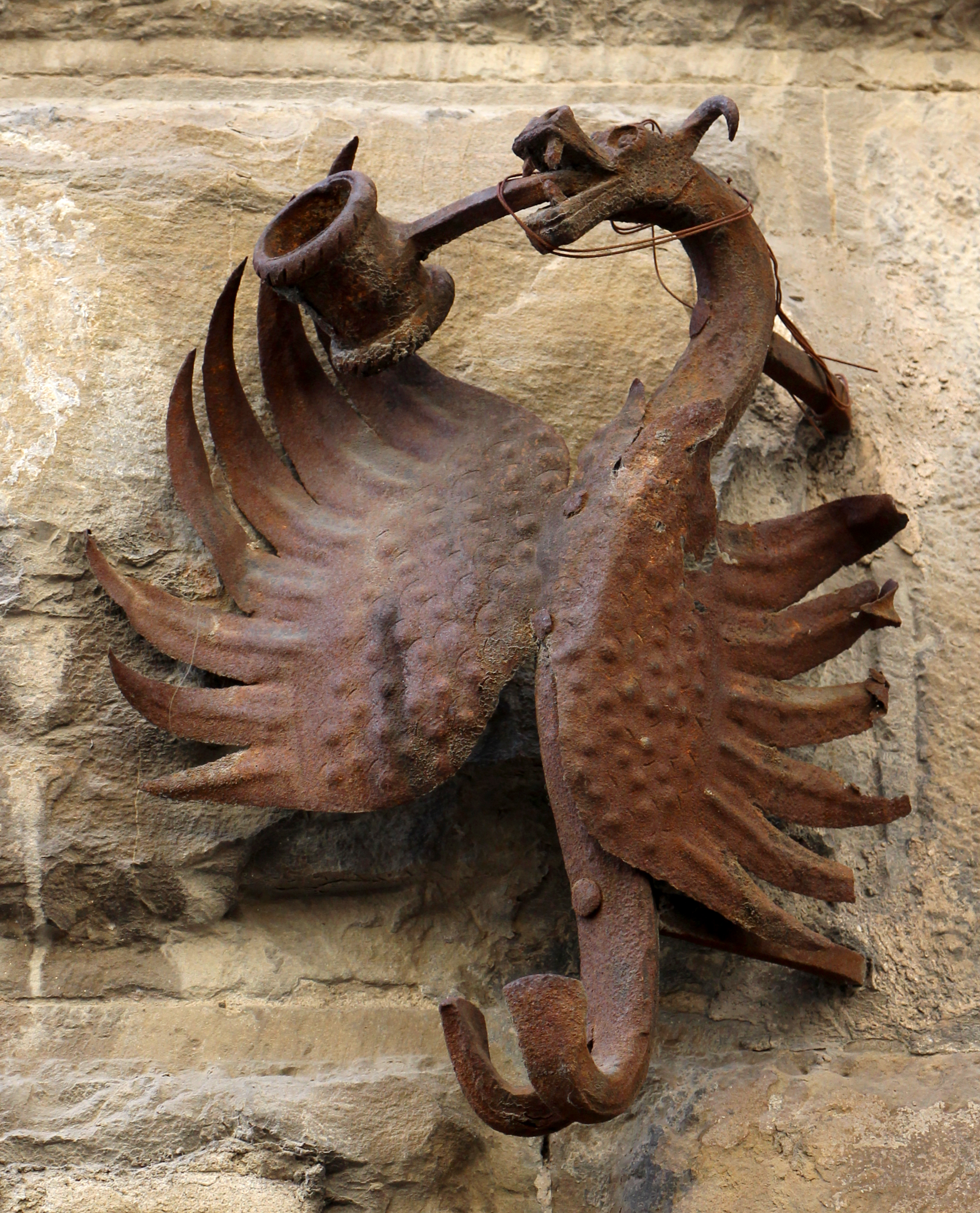
Torch-holder, Via de' Giraldi, Florence
