= Niccolò Grosso =

Italian ironsmith

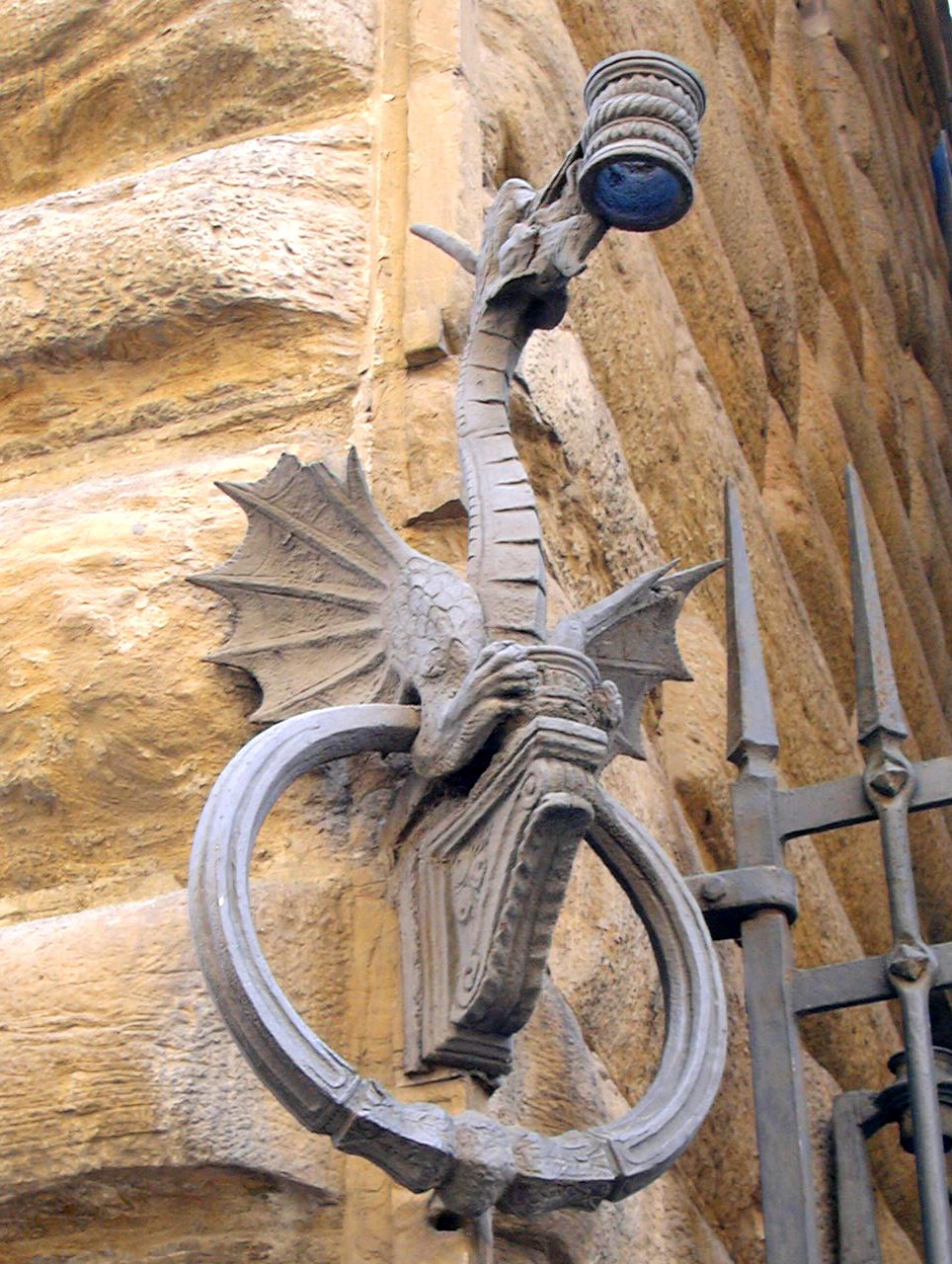
A stand at the Strozzi Palace, Florence.

Niccolò di Noferi del SodoGrosso (fl. c. 1500), also known as Il Caparra for his habit of asking for payment in advance, was one of the few Renaissance ironsmiths that we can identify. He was born in Florence and his most important works are on the exterior of Palazzo Strozzi (the Strozzi Palace) there, even though those are just copies and the originals were moved. These include a lantern in the shape of a classical temple and stands for flag-poles and torches featuring elaborate imaginary animals. It is said that Messer Filippo Strozzi had found Grosso near the construction site selling onions, and hired him out of pity (even though Grosso was already a famous ironsmith). He also made the lanterns, torch-holders and iron rings on the floor of the Palazzo Sigre. Grosso was praised by Giorgio Vasari as the best of ironsmiths.

Sometimes, miniature reproductions of Grosso's Lantern on the Palazzo Strozzi can be found on the second hand market, many new designs are inspired by his original (which was probably a mixture of original influences).

== Gallery ==
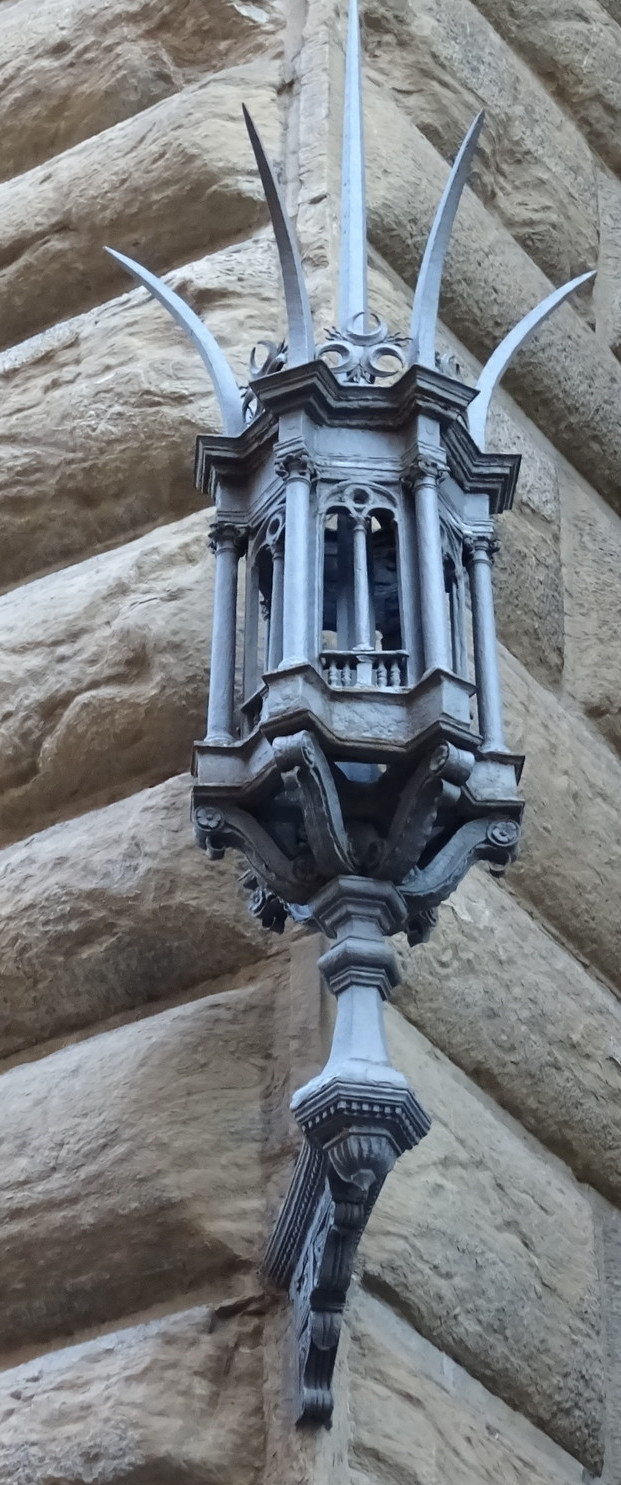
A wrought iron lantern of Grosso.

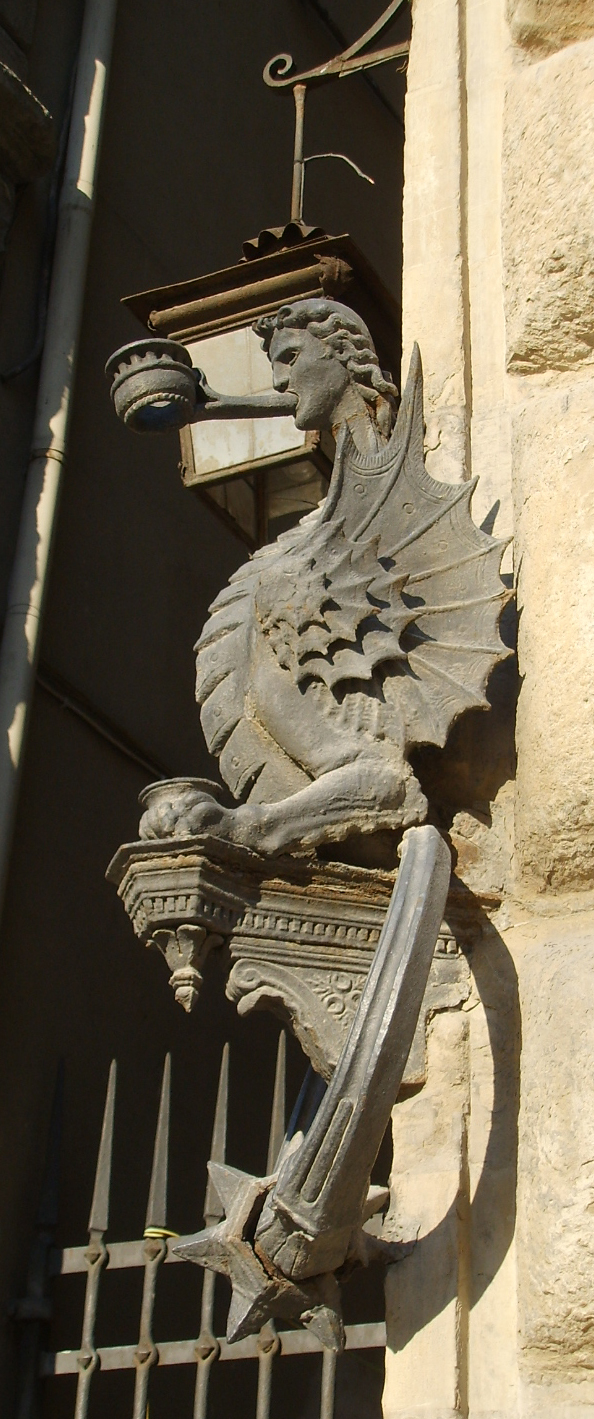
A stand in the form of a sphinx at the Palazzo Strozzi.

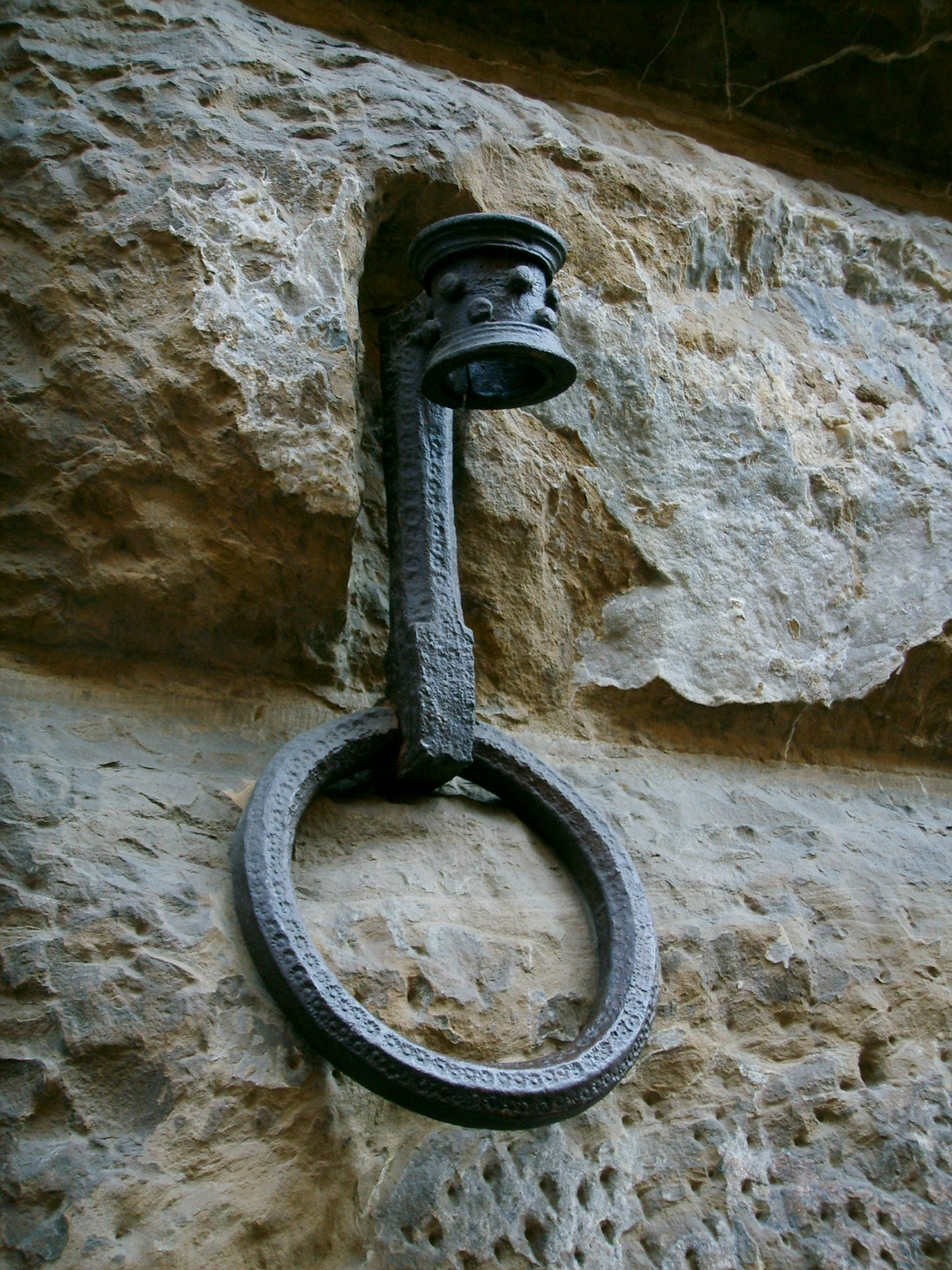
A stand and a ring for horses at Palazzo Medici Riccardi.

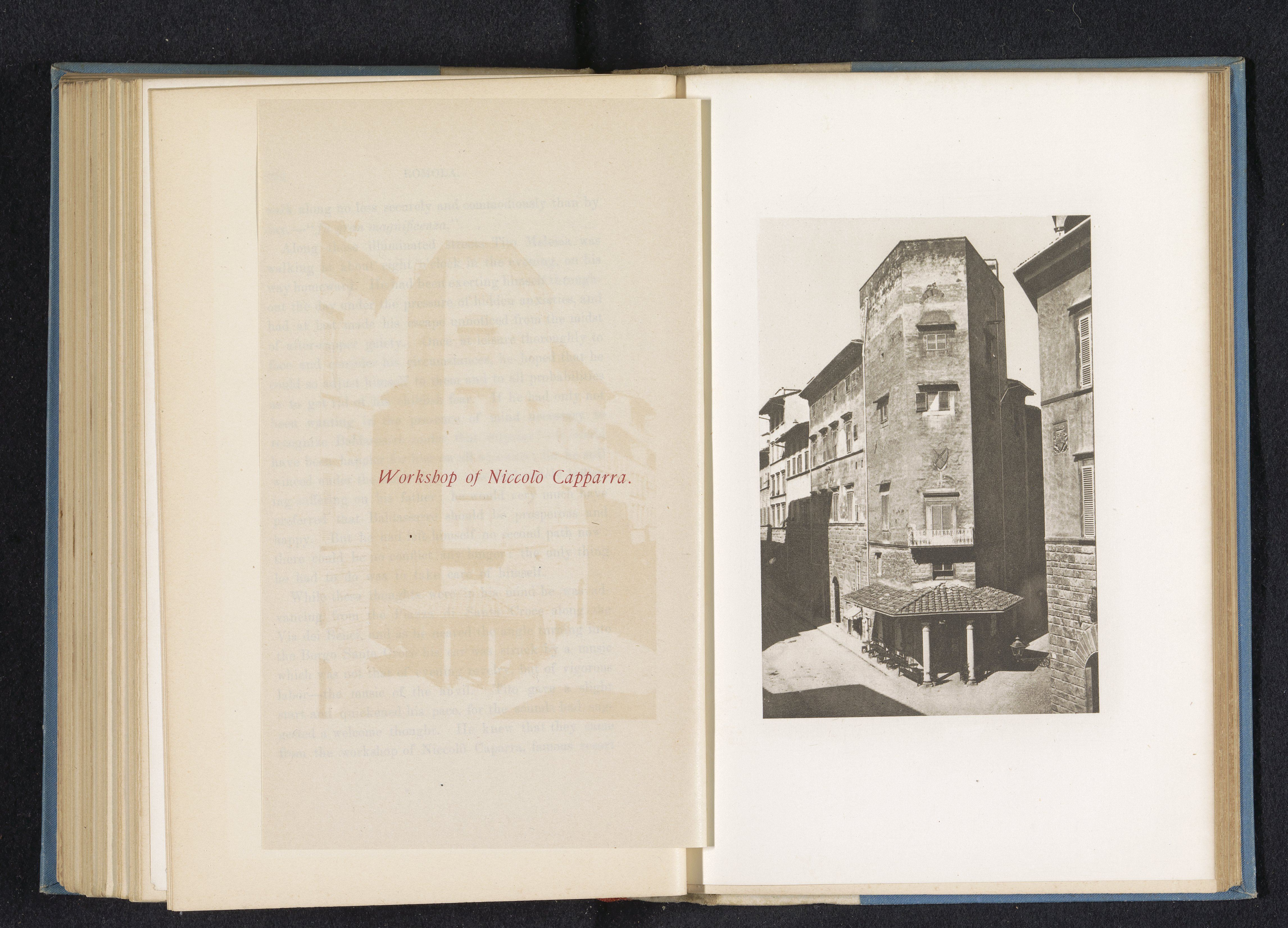
Atelier of Niccolò Grosso, Florence, c. 1880.
