= Complexity Science Hub =

Austrian nonprofit research organization

The Complexity Science Hub Vienna (CSH) is a Vienna-based research organisation with the aim to bundle, coordinate and advance the research of complex systems, system analysis and big data science in Austria.

== Organization ==
The CSH was founded in 2015 as a joint initiative to foster big data science for the benefit of society and to increase the international visibility of Austrian complexity research. The official start was in 2016. Since May 2016 the CSH has been located in Palais Strozzi in Vienna.

The first four member institutions were the TU Wien, the Graz University of Technology, the Medical University of Vienna and the AIT Austrian Institute of Technology. In 2016, the Vienna University of Economics and Business, and the International Institute for Applied System Analysis (IIASA) became members of the CSH. Further members are the Danube University Krems and Austrian Economic Chambers (since 2018), the Institute of Molecular Biotechnology IMBA and the University of Veterinary Medicine Vienna (since 2019), and the Central European University (since 2020).

The CSH is embedded in an international network of complexity research centers and universities, including the Santa Fe Institute in New Mexico, Nanyang Technological University in Singapore, Arizona State University, and the Institute for Advanced Study (IAS) in Amsterdam. Since April 2017, there has been a partnership with the Central European University in Budapest.

Complexity scientist Stefan Thurner has been the first president and scientific director of the CSH since its foundation. The international science advisory board is chaired by the Austrian sociologist Helga Nowotny.

== Research ==
The main topics of research at the CSH include:

- theoretical foundations of complexity science (f.i. properties of complex systems, entropy of complex systems, statistical mechanics, the origin of Power laws, the mathematics of collapse, evolution and co-evolution, path dependence, Agent-based models)
- health and medicine (efficiency and resilience of health care systems, based on health care data; personalized medicine; disease prediction and prevention)
- Systemic risk (Why do complex systems such as banking networks collapse? What is the likelihood of collapse? Can collapse be predicted? How to build a complex system to be stable? )
- Cities ("Science of Cities") (How can data be used for the benefit of cities, the population, the administration ("Smart city")? How do cities become more sustainable? How to increase citizen participation? Is there a direct link between city size and city life?)
- the "Internet of things" (Does a more efficient production automatically lead to more vulnerability? How secure is a fully digitized production when it comes to attacks? How can sensor data be used to answer systemic questions?)
- computational social science (Opinion formation in social networks and heterogeneous societies. How do conflicts arise? How can conflicts be solved? What is the difference between networks of men and women?)
- big data analytics (Do we lose our privacy? Is social media a threat to democracy? How can fake news be identified? What does social media say about gender? Agent-based and big data models of society)
