= K.k. Civil-Mädchen-Pensionat Wien =

Coordinates: 48.2093°N 16.3480°E

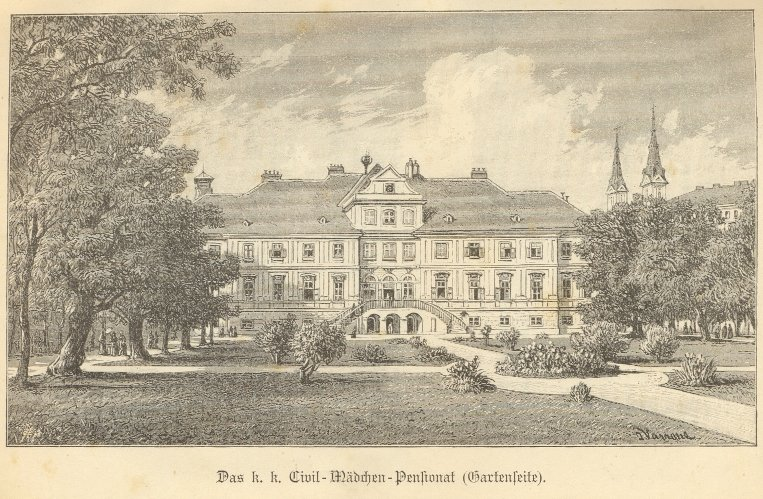

The k.k. Civil-Mädchen-Pensionat Wien was a women's teacher's college in Vienna, Austria, between 1786 and 1919. The school was founded in 1786 by Madame Luzac on permission by Emperor Joseph II, with the purpose of educating girls from the middle classes to professional teachers. It was a pioneer institution in Austria for its time.
