= Palazzo Strozzi =

Palace in Florence, Italy

Coordinates: 43°46′17″N 11°15′07″E

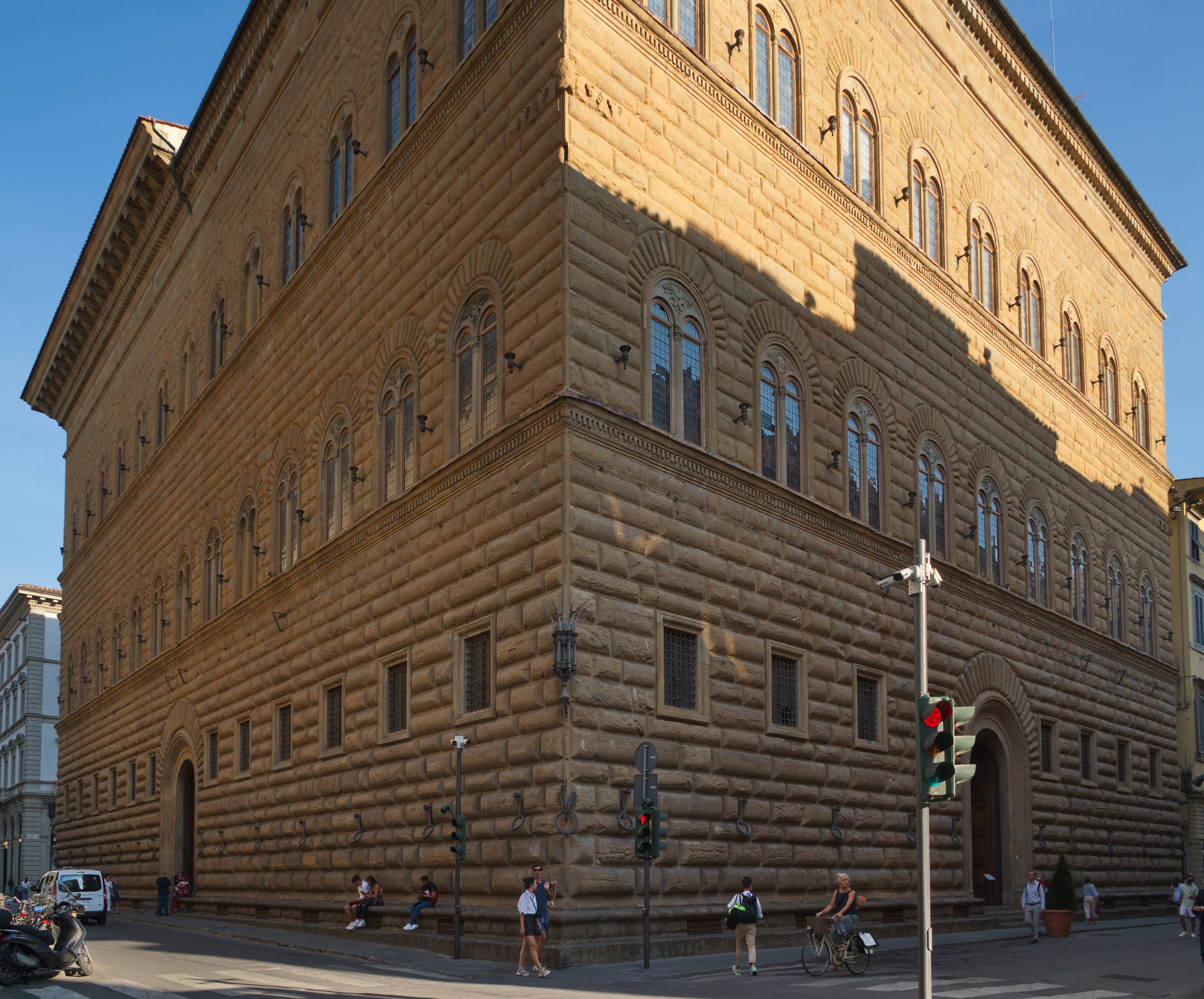
The imposing Palazzo Strozzi, North and West façade

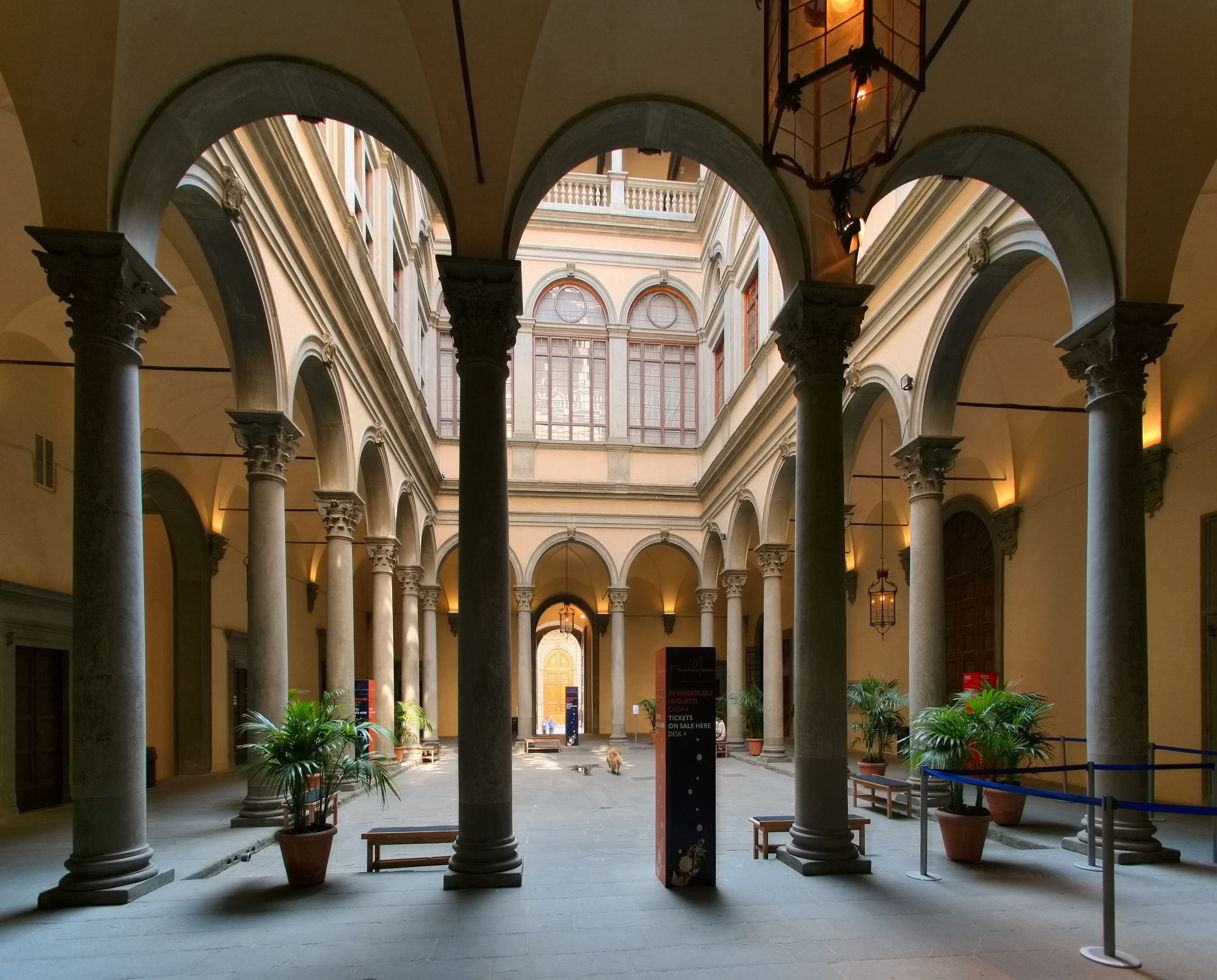
Inner courtyard

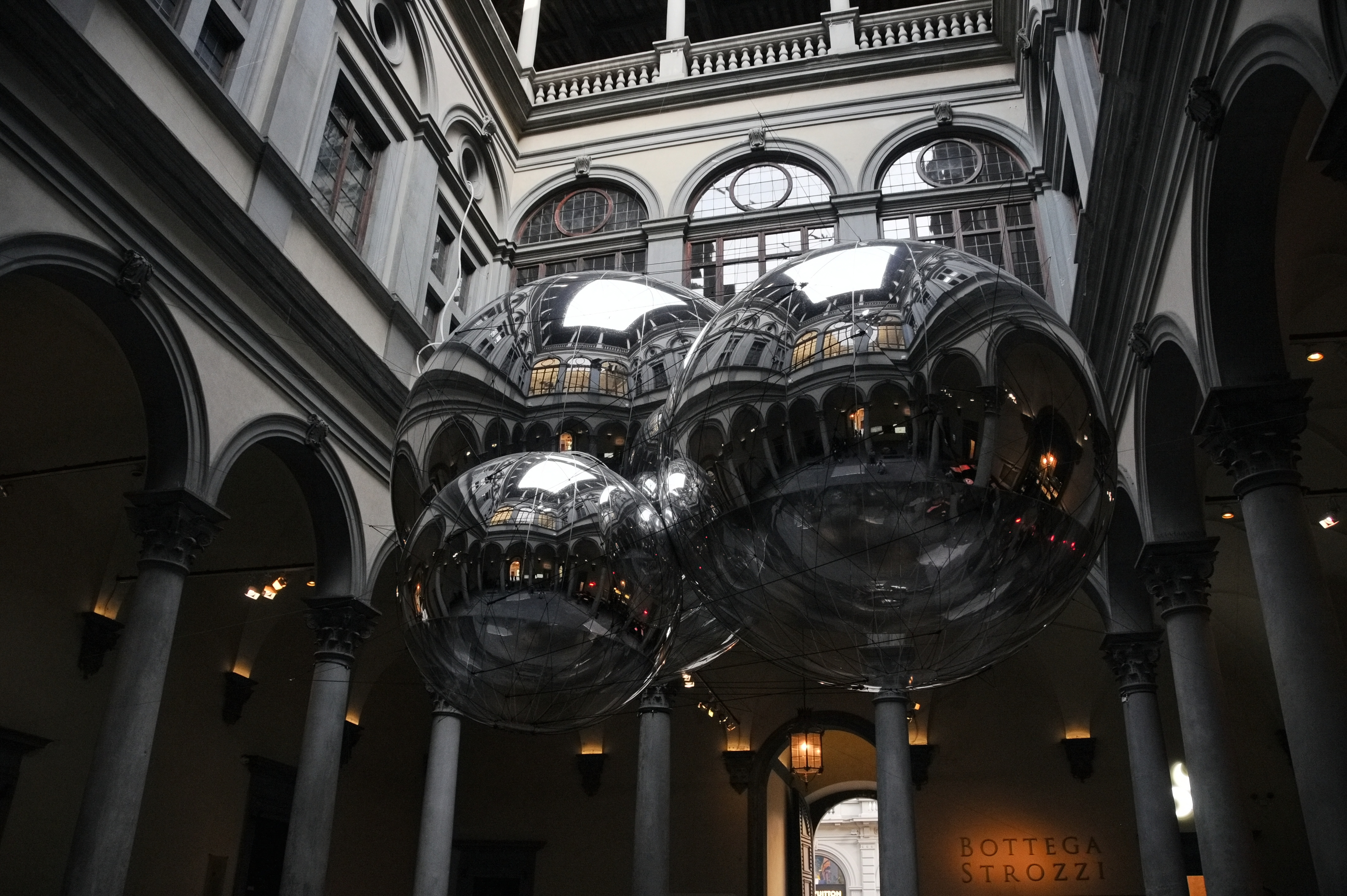
Art exhibit in the inner courtyard

Palazzo Strozzi is a palace in Florence, Italy. It is located in the historic centre between the homonymous Via Strozzi and Piazza Strozzi, and Via Tornabuoni.

== History ==
The construction of the palace was begun in 1489 by Benedetto da Maiano, for Filippo Strozzi the Elder, a rival of the Medici who had returned to the city in November 1466 and desired the most magnificent palace to assert his family's continued prominence and, perhaps more important, a political statement of his own status. A great number of other buildings were acquired during the 1470s and demolished to provide enough space for the new construction. Giuliano da Sangallo provided a wood model of the design. Filippo Strozzi died in 1491, long before the construction's completion in 1538. Duke Cosimo I de' Medici confiscated it in the same year, not returning it to the Strozzi family until thirty years later.

The palace faces the historical Via de' Tornabuoni.

== Description ==
Palazzo Strozzi is an example of civil architecture with its rusticated stone, inspired by the Palazzo Medici, but with more harmonious proportions. Unlike the Medici Palace, which was sited on a corner lot, and thus has only two sides, this building, surrounded on all four sides by streets, is a free-standing structure. This introduced a problem new in Renaissance architecture, which, given the newly felt desire for internal symmetry of planning symmetry: how to integrate the cross-axis. The ground plan of Palazzo Strozzi is rigorously symmetrical on its two axes, with clearly differentiated scales of its principal rooms.

The palazzo has mullioned paired windows (bifore); the radiating voussoirs of the arches increase in length as they rise to the keystone, a detail that was much copied for arched windows set in rustication in the Renaissance revival. Its dominating cornice is typical of the Florentine palaces of the time.

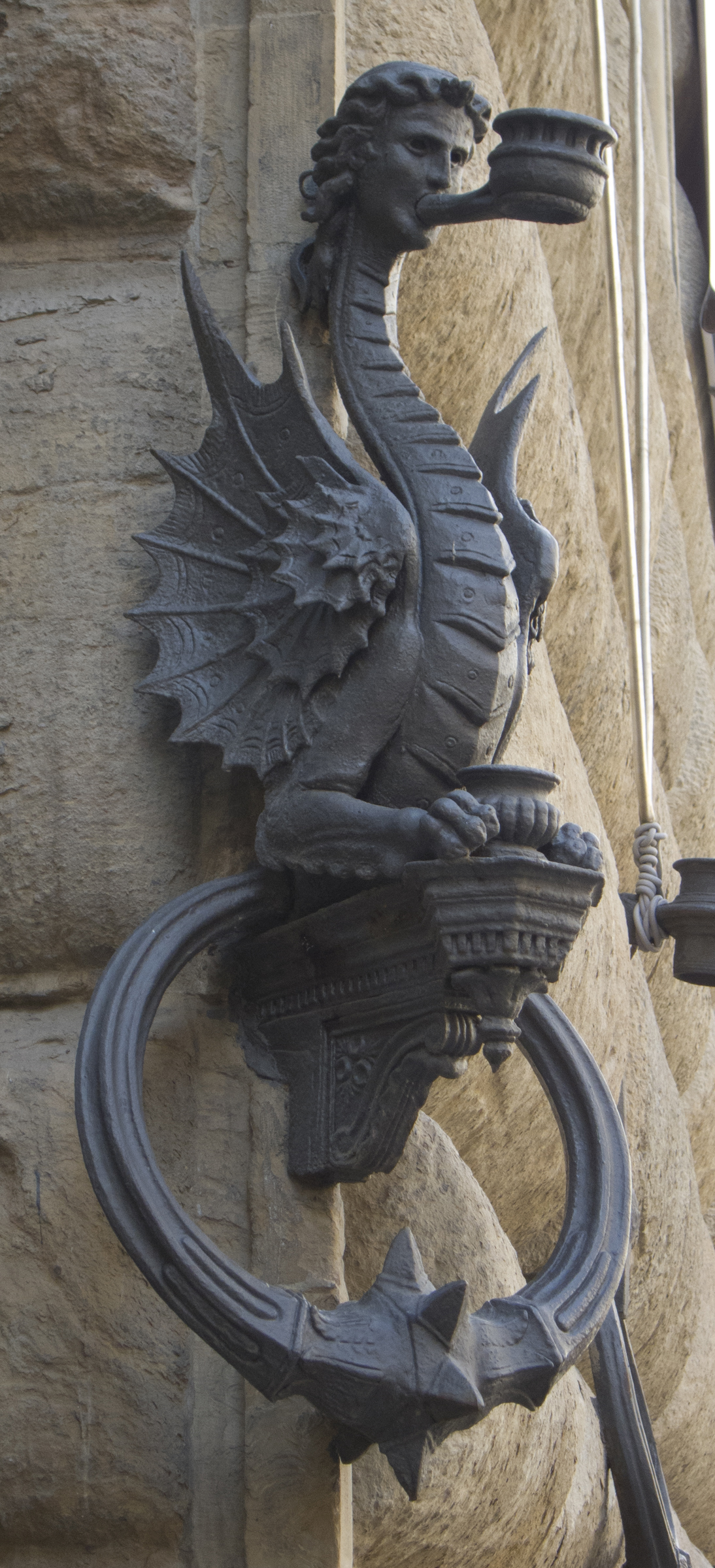
Flagpole stand, iron work by Niccolo Grosso, or Il Caparra

The palace was left incomplete by Simone del Pollaiolo (il Cronaca), who was in charge of the construction of the palace until 1504. Also by Cronaca is the cortile or central courtyard surrounded by an arcade, inspired by Michelozzo.

Wrought-iron objects known as ferro that adorn the building are famous. Many of these appointments to the building, such as flagpole and torch stands, hitches, lanterns, and sconces decorate the palace exterior and its corners as well as filling functional needs of the day. The ferro on the building were created by an ironsmith, Niccolo Grosso, known as Il Caparra.

The palazzo remained the seat of the Strozzi family until 1937. Great changes were made to the building when the Istituto Nazionale delle Assicurazioni occupied Palazzo Strozzi. The palazzo, granted by the Istituto Nazionale delle Assicurazioni to the Italian State in 1999, is now home to the Institute of Humanist Studies and to the Fondazione Palazzo Strozzi. The Gabinetto G.P. Viesseux and the Renaissance Studies Institute have both also occupied the building since 1940. Today the palace is used for international expositions like fashion shows and other cultural and artistic events, such as "Cézanne in Florence. Two Collectors and the 1910 Exhibition of Impressionism". Here also is the seat of the Istituto Nazionale del Rinascimento and the noted Gabinetto Vieusseux, with the library and reading room.

== See also ==
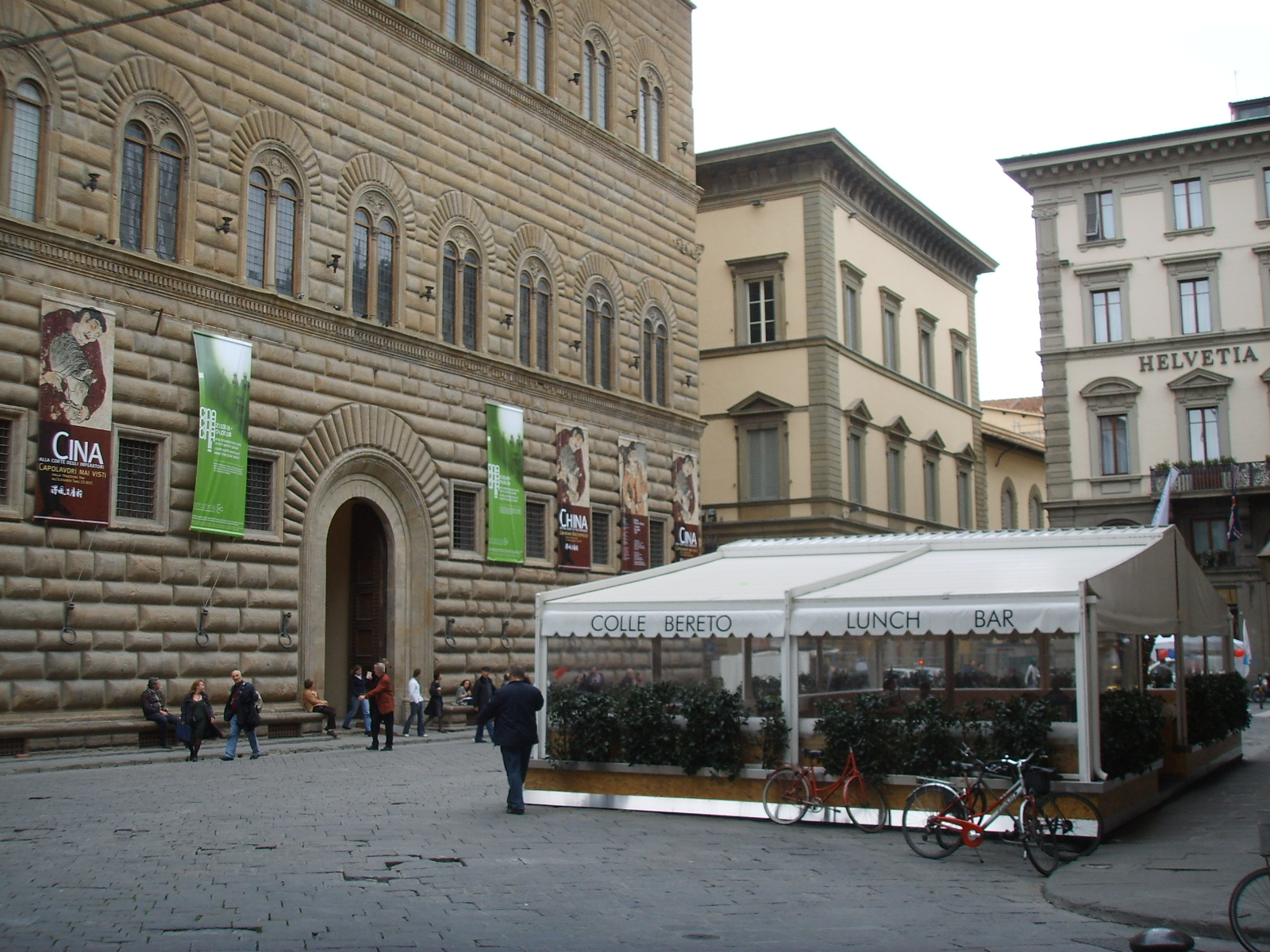
The square

- Wrought-iron objects at Palazzo Strozzi
- Palazzo dello Strozzino
- Palais Strozzi in Vienna

== Sources ==
- Bullard Melissa M., Filippo Strozzi and the Medici: Favor and Finance in Sixteenth-Century Florence and Rome (Cambridge) 1980.
- Goldthwaite, Richard, Private Wealth in Renaissance Florence: A Study of Four Families (Princeton) 1968.
- —, The Building of Renaissance Florence: An Economic and Social History (Baltimore) 1980.
