= C&O desk =

Oval Office desk

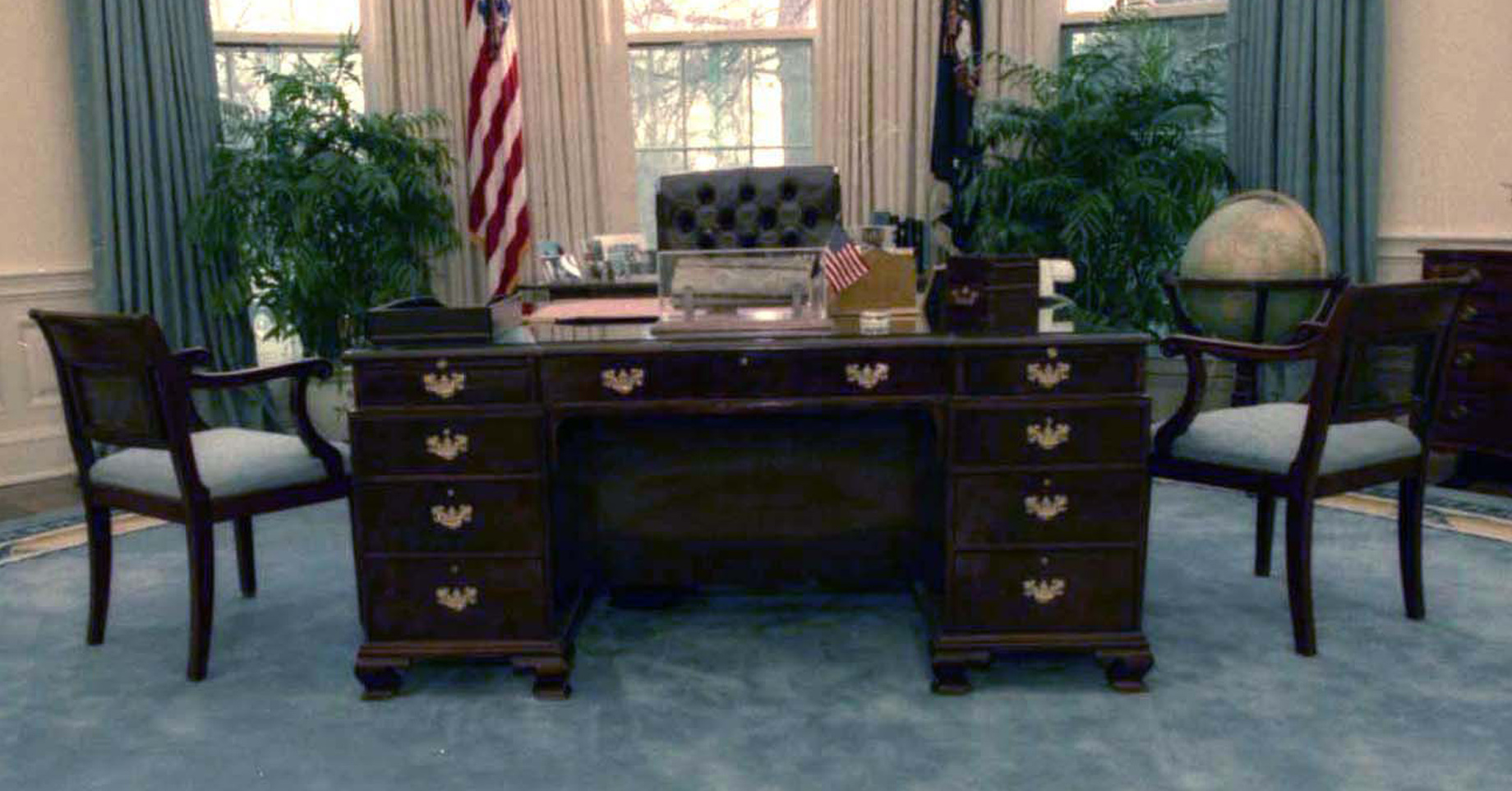
- The C&O desk in the Oval Office during George H. W. Bush's presidency
- Designer: Rorimer-Brooks
- Date: c. 1920
- Materials: Walnut
- Style / tradition: Partners desk

The C&O desk is one of six desks used in the Oval Office by a sitting President of the United States. It is the shortest-serving Oval Office desk to date, used during President George H. W. Bush's term. Prior to his use, the desk had been used elsewhere in the White House.

Built around 1920, the C&O desk is one of four desks built for the owners of the Chesapeake and Ohio Railway (C&O) by Rorimer-Brooks. Following a series of railway mergers, Clement Conger convinced Hays T. Watkins of the Chessie System to loan the desk to the Diplomatic Reception Rooms at the United States Department of State at some point between 1969 and 1974. Conger later became White House Curator. In March 1975, he had the desk moved to the Oval Office Study. It was used in this room by Presidents Gerald Ford, Jimmy Carter, and Ronald Reagan. In 1987, the C&O desk was donated by Chessie System's successor CSX Corporation to the White House, making it a part of the White House collection.

George H. W. Bush first had the C&O desk moved to his office in the White House, then the Executive Residence, and finally the Oval Office. All presidents since then have used the Resolute desk, though Donald Trump temporarily used the C&O desk from February to March 2025 while the Resolute desk was refurbished.

The George H.W. Bush Presidential Library and Museum, in College Station, Texas, houses a full-scale replica of the Oval Office, including a replica of the C&O desk.

== Design and markings ==
The C&O desk, constructed around 1920, is a walnut reproduction of an eighteenth-century Chippendale double pedestal desk, also known as a partners desk. The desk features an inverted breakfront form and each of the two pedestals is veneered with burlwood and contains three graduated drawers on each of the two faces. The narrow desktop consists of a narrow frieze tier of drawers recessed back from the rest of the furniture piece, and the whole desk sits on bracket feet. The top of the desk is inlaid with burled maple.

== History ==
=== Van Sweringen brothers' Terminal Tower offices ===
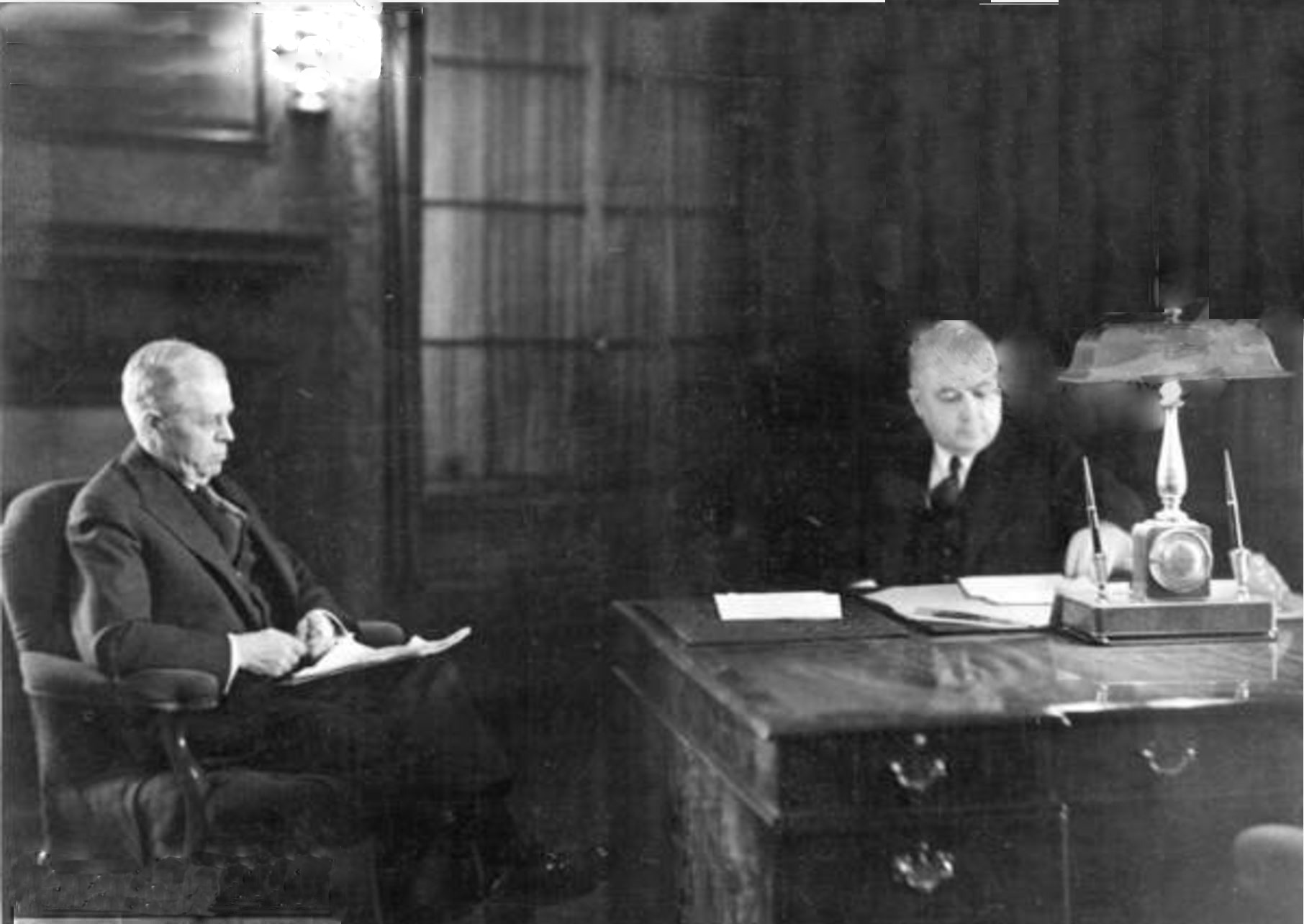
The Van Sweringen brothers sitting at one of the four matching, Rorimer-Brooks designed, walnut partners desks in their Terminal Tower offices, 1928

In 1930, the Van Sweringen brothers, Oris Paxton (O.P.) Van Sweringen and Mantis James (M.J.) Van Sweringen, completed construction of Terminal Tower, a 52-story, 708-foot tall skyscraper built over Union Terminal in Cleveland, Ohio. The tower, built at virtually the same time as the Chrysler Building and the Empire State Building, was designed in a much more conservative, Beaux-Arts style than other towers of the time period. It took a decade to complete. This conservative styling extended to the interiors of the building with the Van Sweringen brothers constructing lavish offices on the 36th floor of the building in an old-world English style.

Featuring suites paneled in oak imported from Sherwood Forest, the rooms were filled with furniture pieces designed and built in a variety of historic English styles by Rorimer-Brooks. Louis Rorimer, the sole head of Rorimer-Brooks, was a Cleveland-based interior designer known for his knowledge of art and architectural history. In 1957, Rorimer-Brooks's records were destroyed by Irvin and Co. who had acquired the company.

Rorimer-Brooks designed and built matching walnut partners desks for the offices on the 36th floor of Terminal Tower, the Van Sweringen's executive offices. Around 1920, four matching desks were made for this floor of the tower, one for each office. The four offices, and the four matching desks, originally were used by O.P. Van Sweringen, M.J. Van Sweringen, C. L. Bradley, and D. S. Barret Jr.

The Van Sweringen brothers built a vast tangle of real estate and railroad holdings, including the Chesapeake and Ohio Railway (C&O). This all came crashing down with the onset of the Great Depression. In May 1935, the Van Sweringen empire collapsed when they had to use all of their cash and equity to pay off creditors. Both of the brothers died shortly after, with M.J. dying on December 12, 1935, and O.P. dying on November 23, 1936. After the deaths of the brothers, the C&O offices remained in Terminal Tower. The desks remained in the four rooms and were used by C&O Chairman Cyrus Eaton, the railroad president, the president's key associate, and one was set aside for visiting dignitaries.

=== Diplomatic Reception Rooms ===
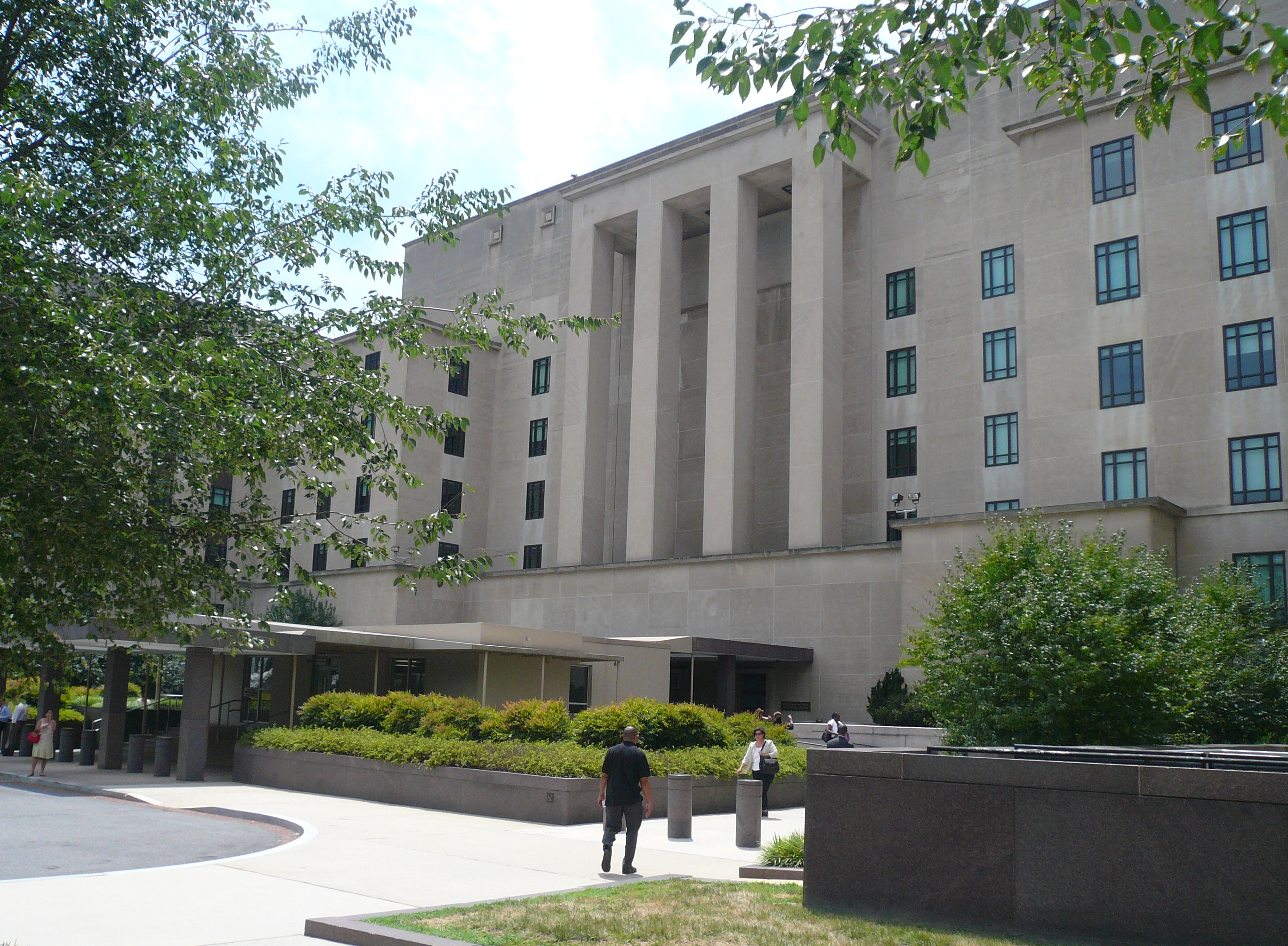
The Harry S. Truman Building, headquarters of the U.S. State Department

During the 1950s the new headquarters of the United States Department of State were planned and constructed at what is now called the Harry S Truman Building. Clement Conger, then an Assistant Chief of Protocol, recommended that a large area of the building be set aside for Diplomatic Reception Rooms as hotels and clubs had to be used for entertaining and receptions by the Vice President and Cabinet members as they could not use the spaces in the White House.

Funds were appropriated by Congress to build these sixteen rooms but no funds were set aside for furnishings or interior decoration. Opening with their first official event in January 1961, the rooms "looked like a 1950s motel: exterior walls made of floor-to-ceiling plate glass with exposed steel beams, openings without doors, support beams encased in fire-proofing material set out three feet from the walls, wall-to-wall carpeting on concrete floors, and acoustical-tile ceilings throughout" according to Conger.

After Conger gave a tour of the space to Mary Caroline Pratt Herter, wife of then-Secretary of State Christian Herter, who was hosting the first event in the rooms, Mrs. Herter began to cry due to the quality of the rooms. Conger explained that, after this interaction, he, "offered then to run a public campaign to furnish the rooms in a manner befitting America's heritage." Conger founded the Office of Fine Arts in the State Department and after their first meeting on March 22, 1961, began acquiring furniture and objects to decorate the Diplomatic Rooms purely through donations. The only government funds were spent on salaries and office expenses.

Because no federal funds were used to decorate the spaces Conger was creative in how he acquired pieces for the collection. Conger explains, "Early on, I learned that collectors overcollect and that the Diplomatic Reception Rooms are attractive homes for a family's superabundance of objects. One of my best methods for acquiring needed pieces has been to ask for them on loan. Once people see such pieces in place, they want to demonstrate their commitment to the nation and to international diplomacy by donating their possessions or by making a purchase possible at a reasonable price." One of the objects collected in this manner was what we now call the C&O desk.

In 1963, the C&O acquired the Baltimore and Ohio forming a conglomerate called the Chessie System. According to a document listing objects loaned to the White House between 1969 and 1974, Hays T. Watkins of the Chessie System loaned the C&O desk to the Diplomatic Reception Rooms. Watkins recalled Conger's attempt to get the desk in his memoir, Just call me Hays. Watkins recalls,

... Clement Conger, curator of the White House at the time, was in Cleveland and saw our offices. He spotted my desk and said, "I've been looking for a desk for the President's private study just like that. Would you give it to us?" I said, "No." Then he asked if we would sell it to them? Again, I declined. "Well," he said, "would you loan it to us so we could use it for a while?" I said, "For how long?" He said, "Indefinitely." After talking with the board, we agreed.

The desk was subsequently loaned to the White House at some point between 1969 and 1974.

=== White House ===
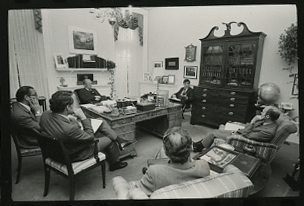
Gerald Ford sits behind the C&O desk in the Oval Office Study during a meeting with Frank Zarb, Charles W. Robinson, Alan Greenspan, James M. Cannon, and Brent Scowcroft.

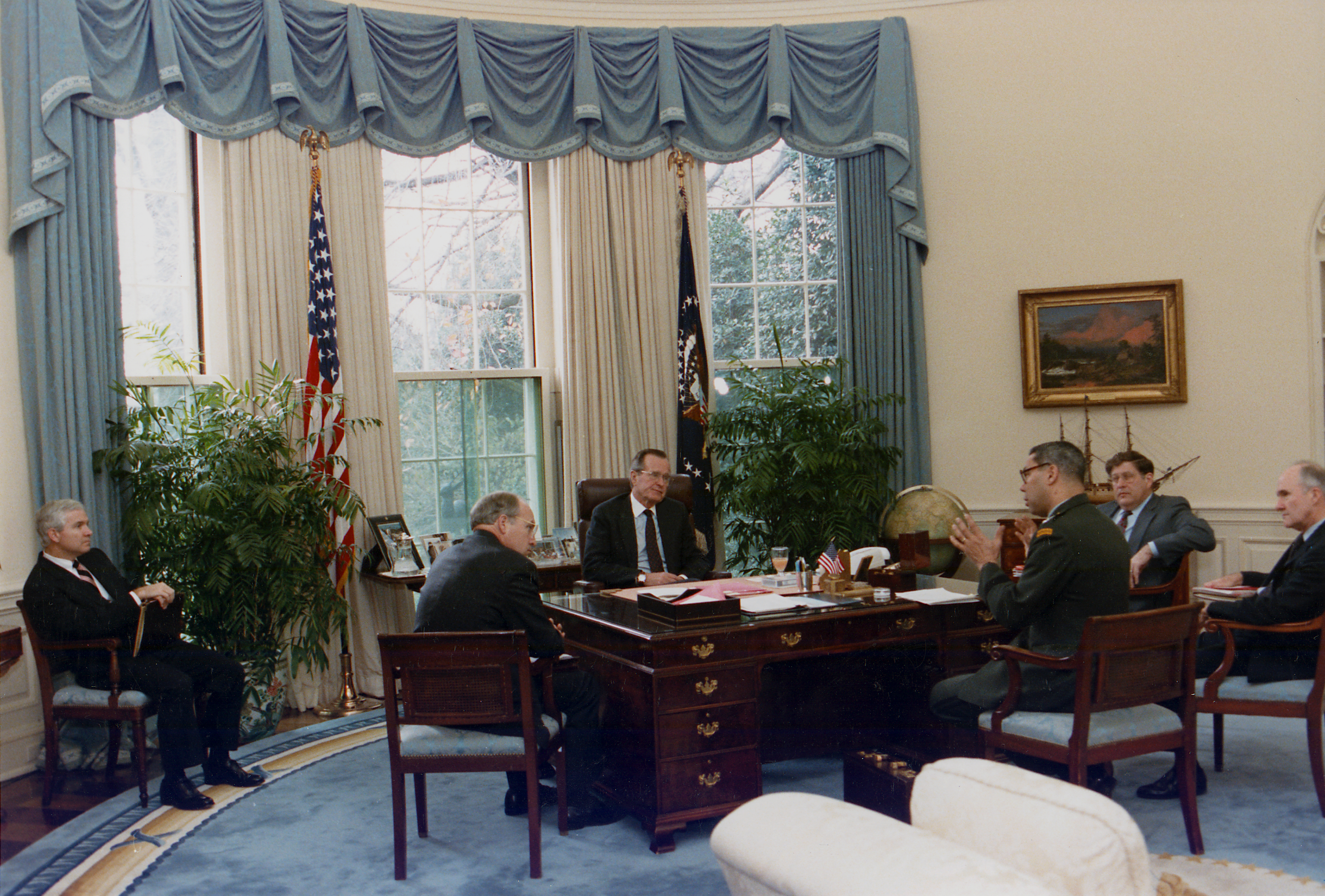
President Bush meeting with Dick Cheney, Colin Powell, Brent Scowcroft, John H. Sununu and Robert Gates at the C&O desk

In March 1975, Conger, who had by then become the White House Curator, placed the C&O desk in the Oval Office Study. He wrote a memo to Gerald Ford noting the new historic items recently placed in the room including the desk, which was still on loan. Presidents Gerald Ford, Jimmy Carter, and Ronald Reagan all used the desk in this room just next to the Oval Office.

After a series of mergers, the newly named Chessie System merged with Seaboard Coast Line Industries in November 1980, to form the new CSX Corporation. CSX kept the Van Sweringen brothers' offices in Terminal Tower until vacating them in 1986. In 1987, during the presidency of Ronald Reagan, the C&O desk was donated by the CSX Corporation to the White House.

On May 2, 1985, the desk was moved from the Oval Office study to then-Vice President George H. W. Bush's main work space in the White House, where he started using it. Marlin Fitzwater, White House Press Secretary under both presidents Ronald Reagan and George H. W. Bush, said that Bush found the desk comfortable and attractive.

After George H. W. Bush's presidential inauguration on January 20, 1989, the C&O desk was used in the residential portion of the White House. On June 13, 1989, it was moved into the newly decorated Oval Office. The Resolute desk, the Oval Office desk removed for the C&O, was placed briefly in the White House storage room, but was ultimately placed in the Treaty Room (which Bush used as an ancillary office) for most of his presidency.

Doro Bush Koch, one of George Bush's children, wrote that Bush chose to use the C&O desk due to a perceived tradition. Lyndon B. Johnson chose not to use the Resolute desk after Kennedy's assassination and instead moved the desk he used as vice president to the Oval Office. Koch inaccurately claims that Richard Nixon and Gerald Ford also brought their vice-presidential desks to the Oval Office. In actuality, Ford had retained Nixon's presidential desk, the Wilson Desk.

Presidents that placed the Resolute Desk in their Oval Office, such as Jimmy Carter, had never been a vice president. Therefore, Koch claims that Bush brought his vice-presidential desk as a way to continue what he perceived to be a tradition. This perceived tradition was not followed by the next one-time vice president to assume the presidency, with Joe Biden opting to use the Resolute Desk in his Oval Office.

On the desk Bush kept a pencil holder with a small American flag. This flag was given to him in 1989 by a nineteen-year-old Army Ranger at a San Antonio hospital who lost both an arm and a leg during the United States invasion of Panama that year. Bush kept the flag prominently displayed as a reminder of the sacrifices soldiers make. When dignitaries from other countries visited the Oval Office, Bush asked that a small flag from their country be displayed in the pencil cup as well.

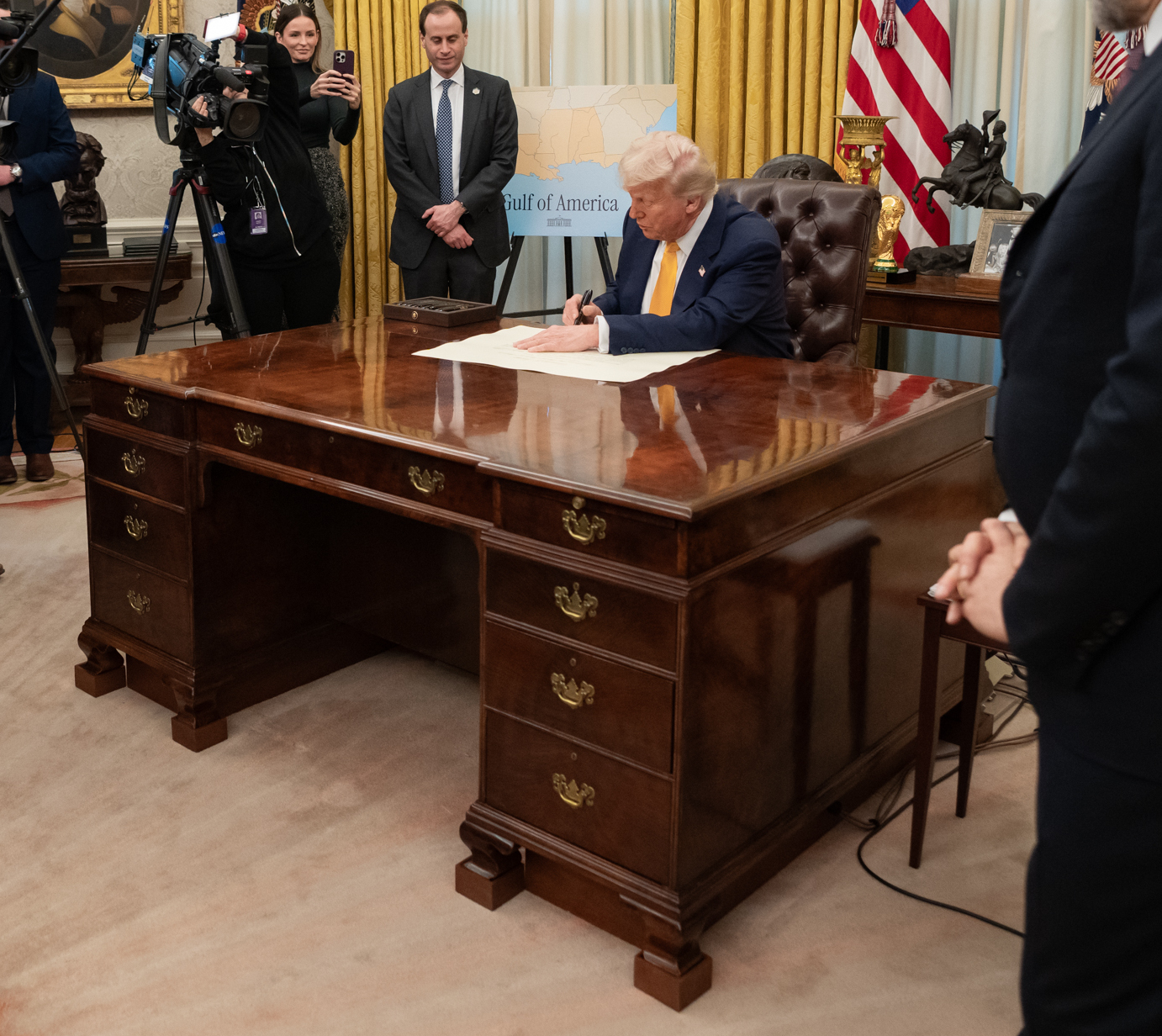
Donald Trump at the C&O desk during the swearing in of Howard Lutnick as Commerce Secretary

Bush was defeated by Bill Clinton in the 1992 United States presidential election. Before leaving office on January 20, 1993, Bush wrote a note to Clinton and left it on his desk in the Oval Office. This note continued a tradition where outgoing presidents leave private messages to incoming presidents on the Oval Office desk, which was started by Bush's predecessor Reagan. Clinton moved the Resolute desk back into the Oval Office for his presidency. The C&O Desk remained as part of the White House collection after Bush left office, according to Jay Patton, the supervisory curator of the George H.W. Bush Presidential Library and Museum.

In February 2025, Donald Trump temporarily returned the desk to the Oval Office while the Resolute desk underwent refinishing. This switch of desks was announced in the following Truth Social post by Donald Trump:

A President, after election, gets a choice of 1 in 7 desks. This desk, the “C&O,” which is also very well-known and was used by President George H.W. Bush and others, has been temporarily installed in the White House while the Resolute Desk is being lightly refinished—a very important job. This is a beautiful, but temporary replacement!

The desk was in the Oval Office for roughly a month before the Resolute desk returned in mid-March.

== Timeline ==
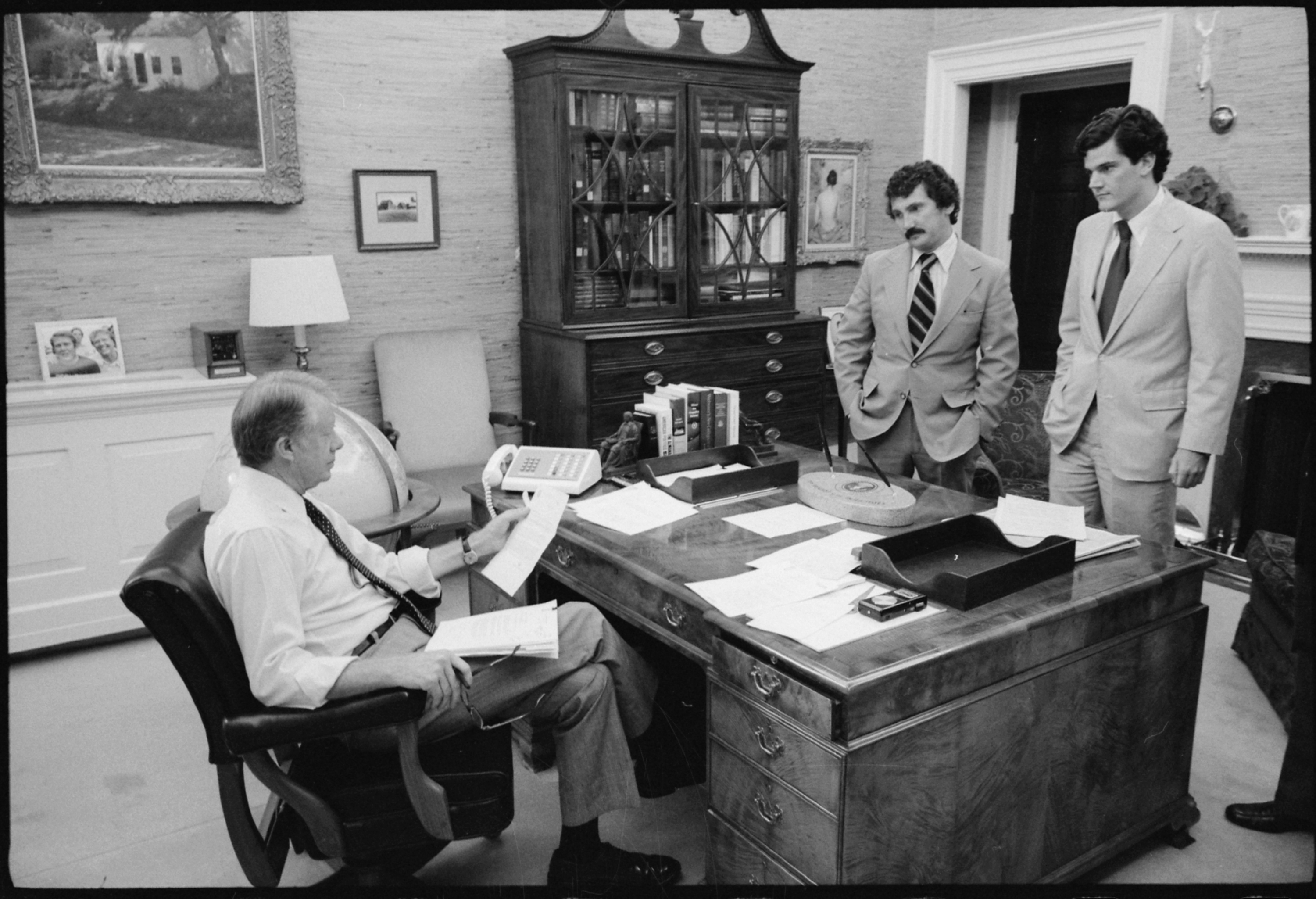
Jimmy Carter in his study sitting at the C&O Desk, August 7, 1978

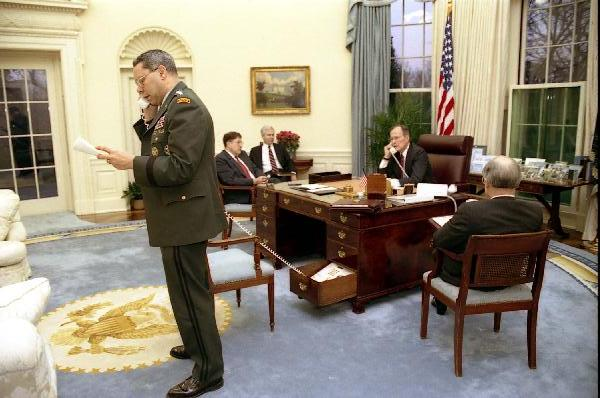
George H. W. Bush, sitting at the C&O desk, speaks on the phone with John Major while Colin Powell uses a secondary phone stored in one of the desk's drawers to speak with Norman Schwarzkopf.

The location of the desk from its construction to present day and each tenant of the desk:

Tenant	Location	Dates	Ref.
Van Sweringen brothers offices	Terminal Tower 36th floor Cleveland, Ohio	1930 – sometime between 1969 and 1974	
Chesapeake and Ohio Railway offices	Terminal Tower 36th floor Cleveland, Ohio	1930 – sometime between 1969 and 1974	
Chessie System offices	Terminal Tower 36th floor Cleveland, Ohio	1930 – sometime between 1969 and 1974	
United States Department of State	Diplomatic Reception Rooms, Harry S Truman Building; Washington, DC	sometime between 1969 and 1974 – 1975	
Gerald Ford	Oval Office Study; White House	1975–1985	
Jimmy Carter	Oval Office Study; White House	1975–1985	
Ronald Reagan	Oval Office Study; White House	1975–1985	
George H. W. Bush	Vice President's Office; White House	1985–1989	
George H. W. Bush	White House Residence	1989	
George H. W. Bush	Oval Office; White House	1989–1993	
None	White House collection	1993–2025	
Donald Trump	Oval Office; White House	2025	
None	White House collection	2025–present	

== Replicas ==
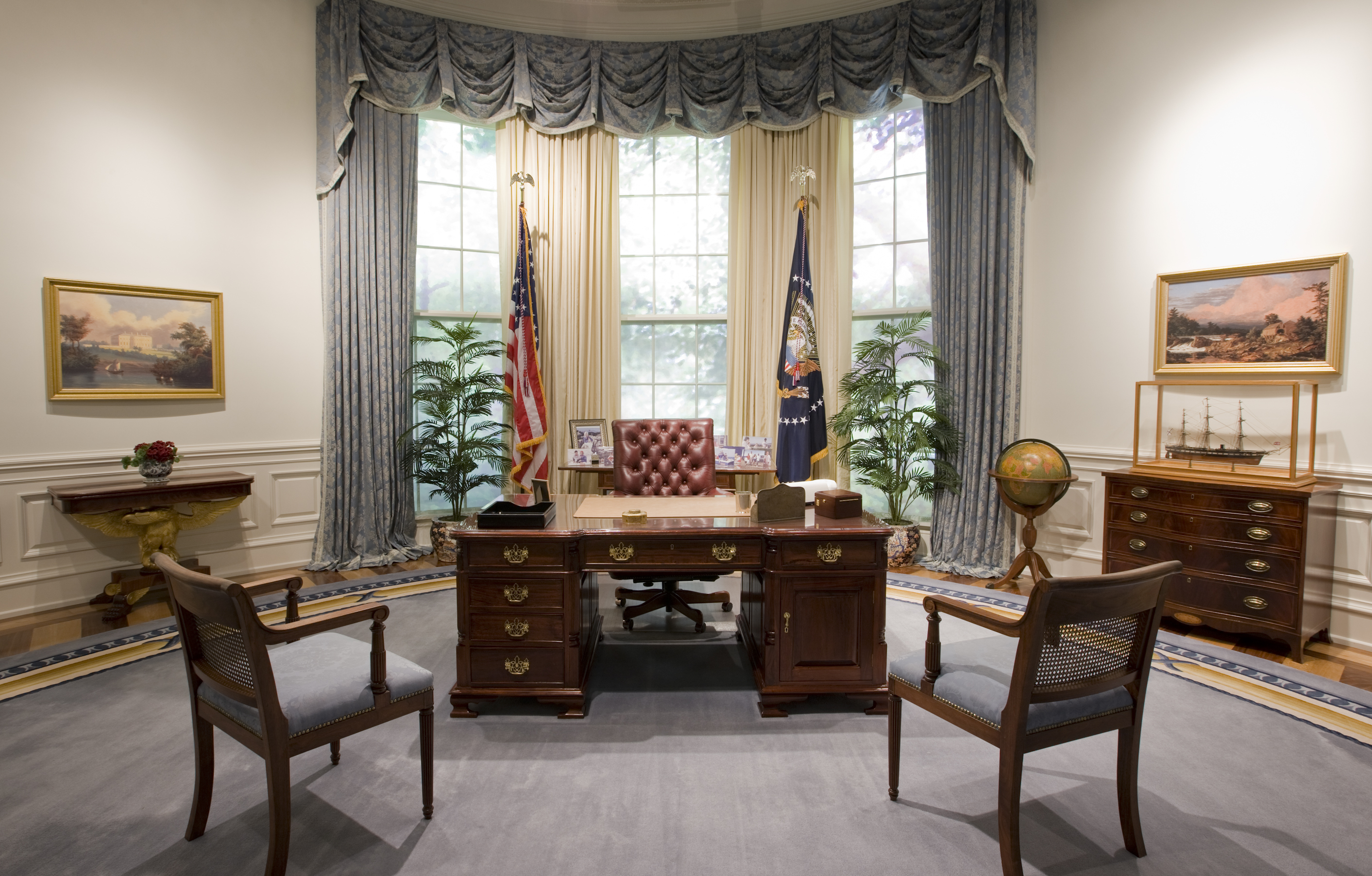
Replica Oval Office at the George Bush Presidential Library

A replica of the C&O desk is located in the George Bush Presidential Library, in College Station, Texas, as a part of a full-scale replica of the Oval Office furnished as it was during Bush's presidency. This Oval Office replica was not original to the museum but was added approximately ten years after its creation. According to Warren Finch, director of the library, Bush thought such replicas were boring, as every other presidential library had one. When the replica was finally added it became one of the most popular displays in the library.
