= C&O =

C&O is an abbreviation that may refer to:

- Chesapeake and Ohio Railway in the United States
  - C&O desk
- Chesapeake and Ohio Canal in the United States
- Callander and Oban Railway in Scotland
