= White House Chief of Staff =

U.S. presidential appointee

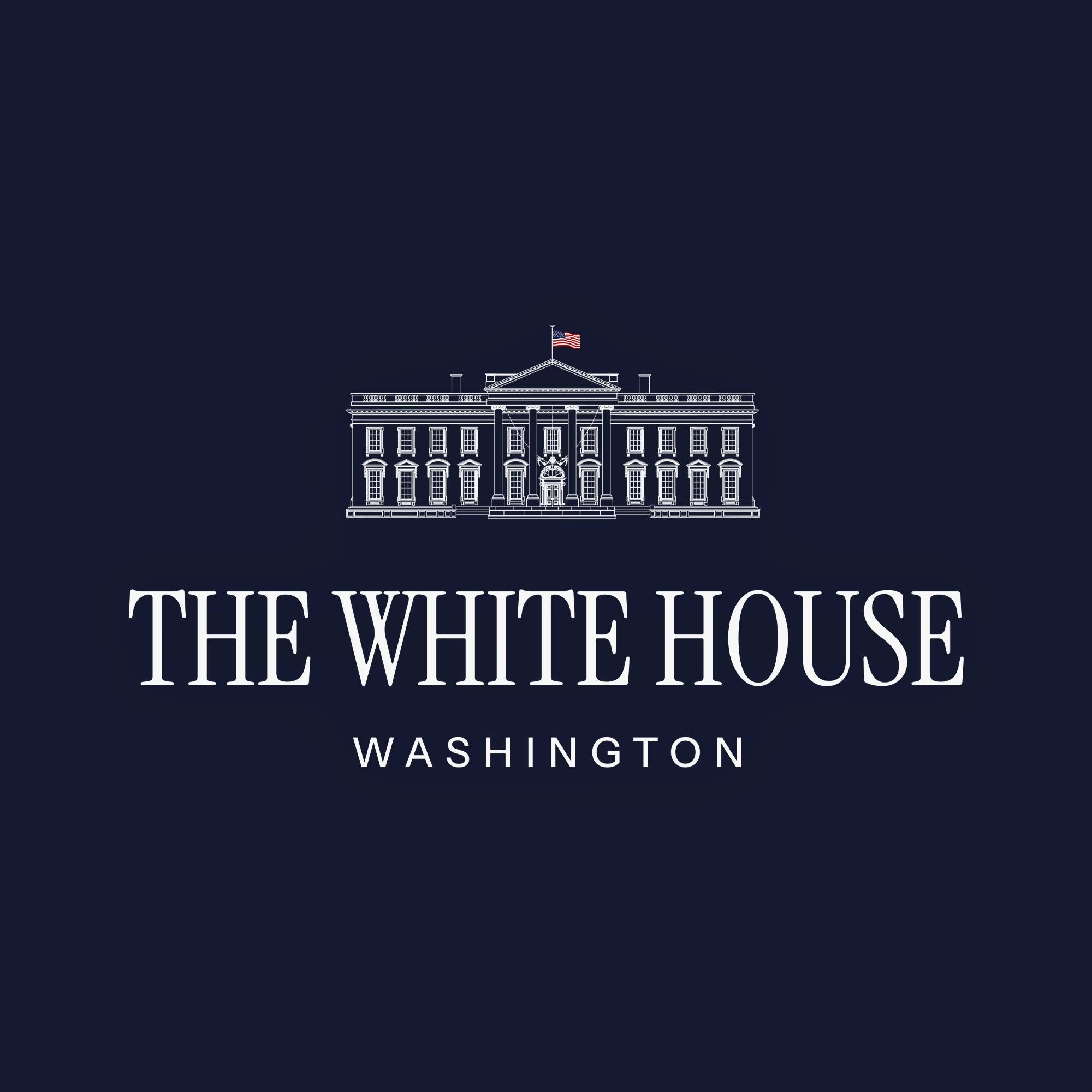

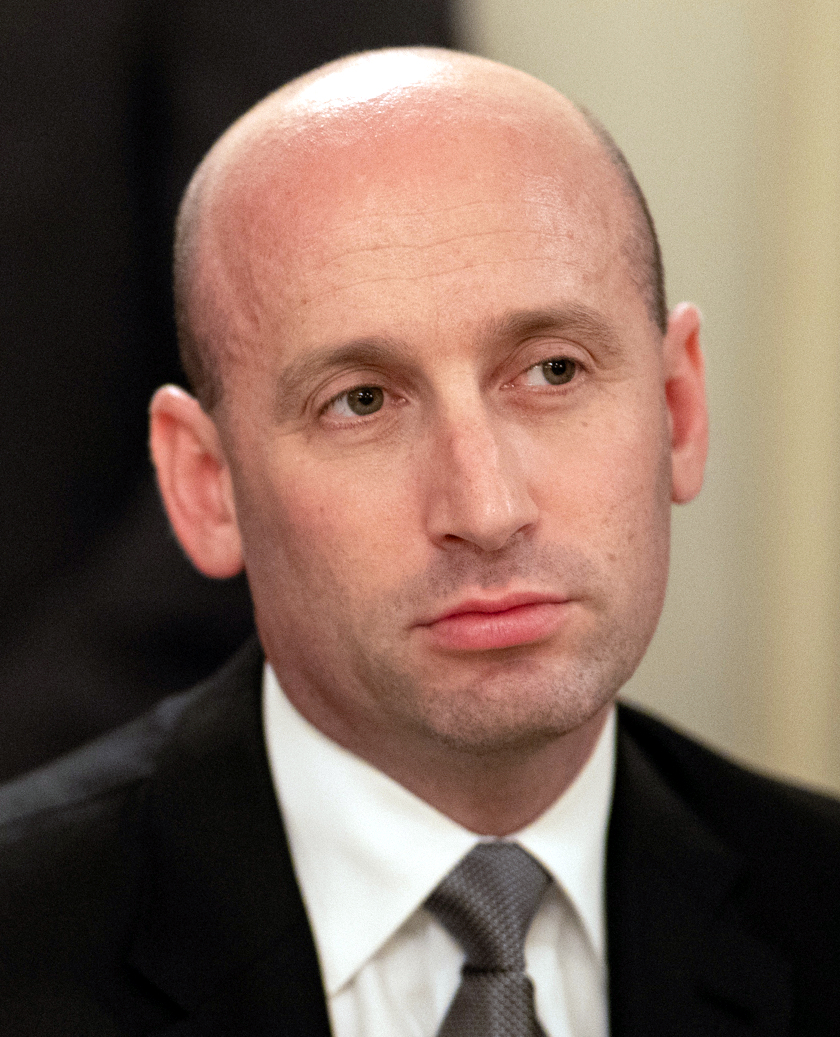
- Incumbent; Stephen Miller since November 9, 2026
- White House Office; Executive Office of the President
- Reports to: President of the United States
- Appointer: President of the United States
- Formation: 1946 (Assistant to the President); 1961 (White House Chief of Staff)
- First holder: John R. Steelman
- Deputy: White House Deputy Chief of Staff
- Website: www.whitehouse.gov

White House Chief of Staff General Alexander Haig during a meeting with President Richard Nixon and Vice President-Designate and House Minority Leader Congressman Gerald Ford and Secretary of State Henry Kissinger at the Oval Office, White House on October 13, 1973

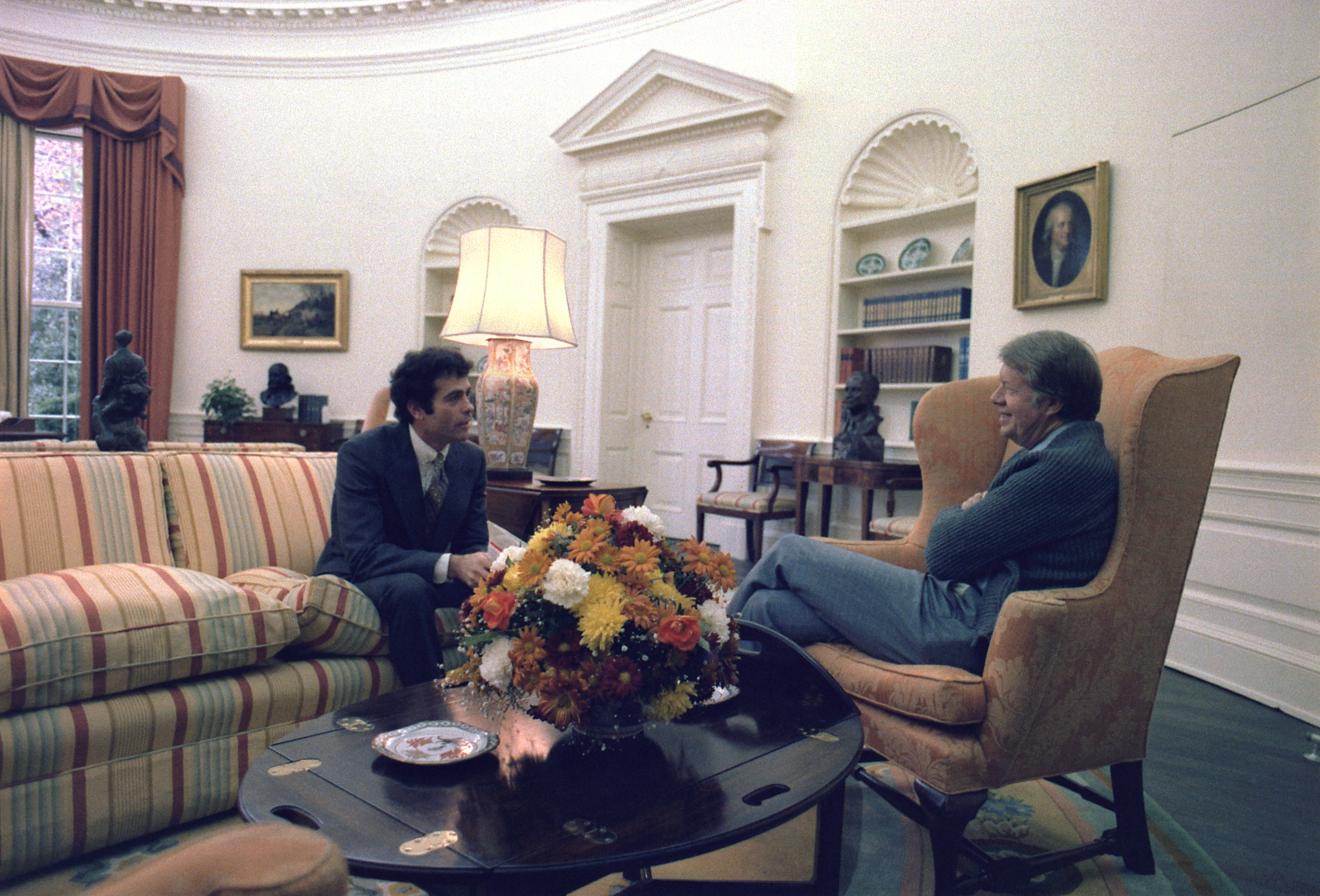
Chief of Staff Jack Watson (1980–1981) meets with President Jimmy Carter in the Oval Office, in 1977

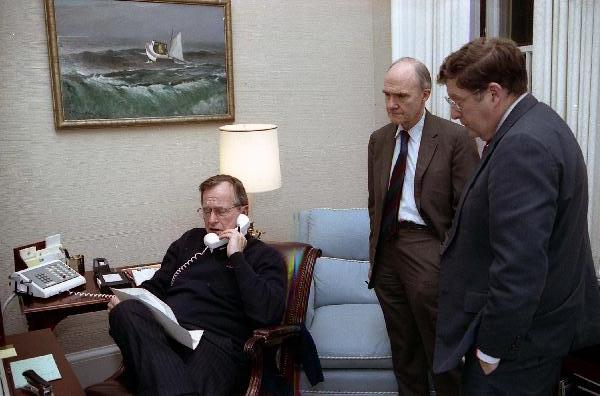
President George H. W. Bush sits at his desk in the Oval Office Study as Chief of Staff John Sununu stands nearby, in 1989

President George W. Bush shares a light moment with White House Chief of Staff Andrew Card at the Oval Office, White House in 2005

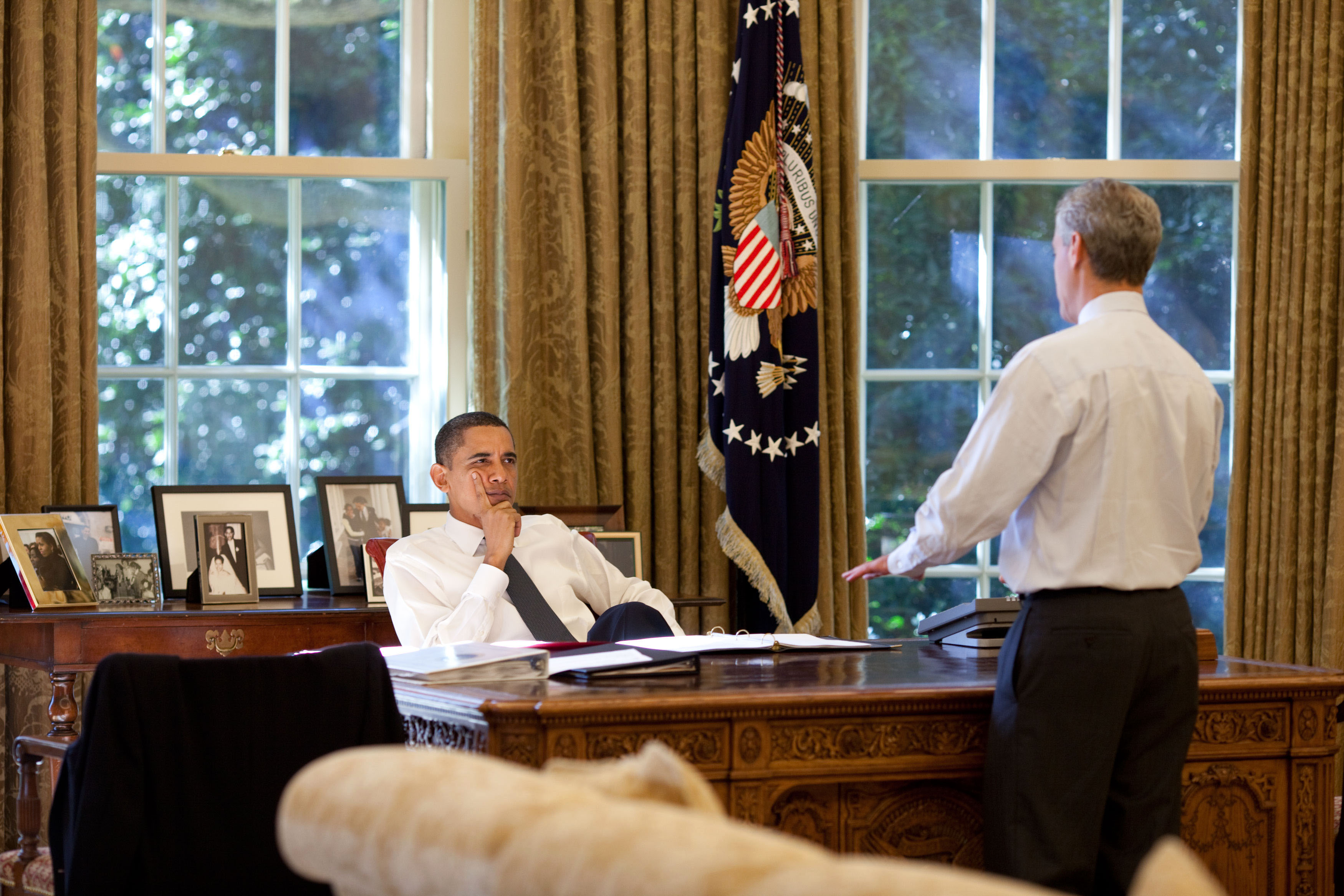
President Barack Obama meets with White House Chief of Staff Rahm Emanuel in the Oval Office, in 2009

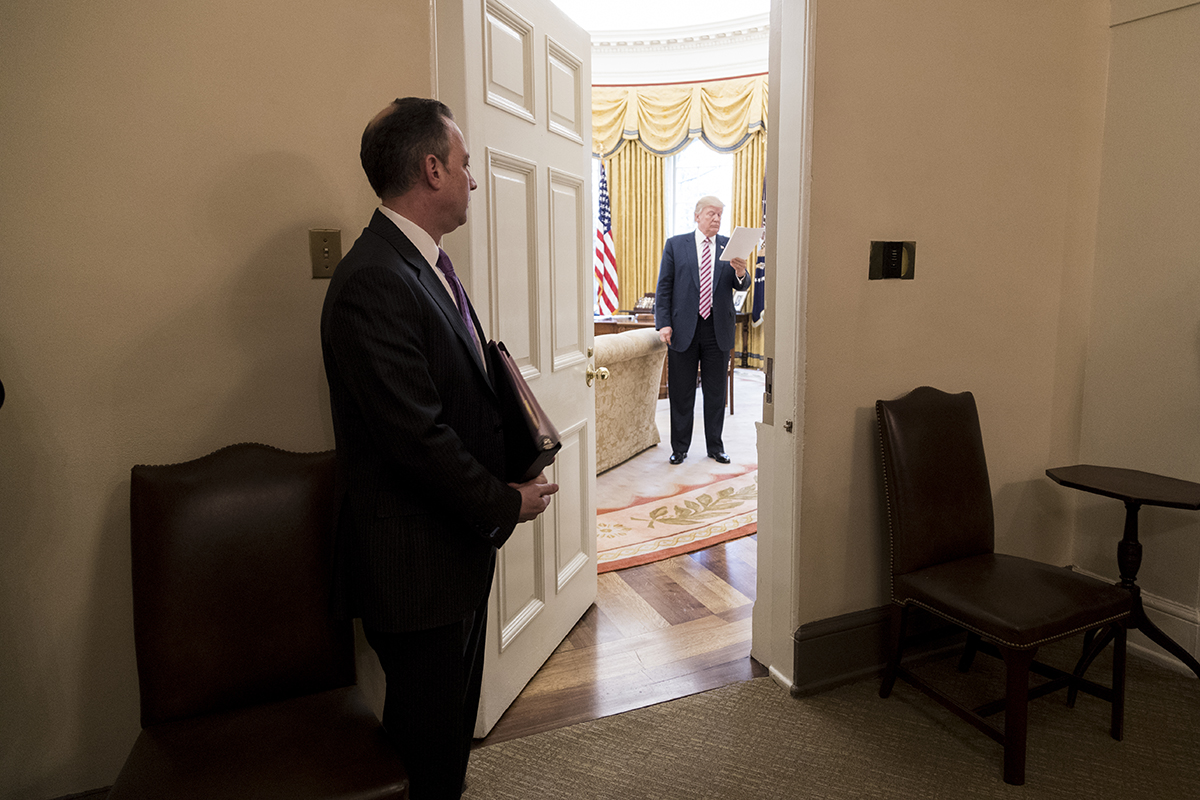
Chief of Staff Reince Priebus looks into the Oval Office as President Donald Trump reads over his notes, in 2017

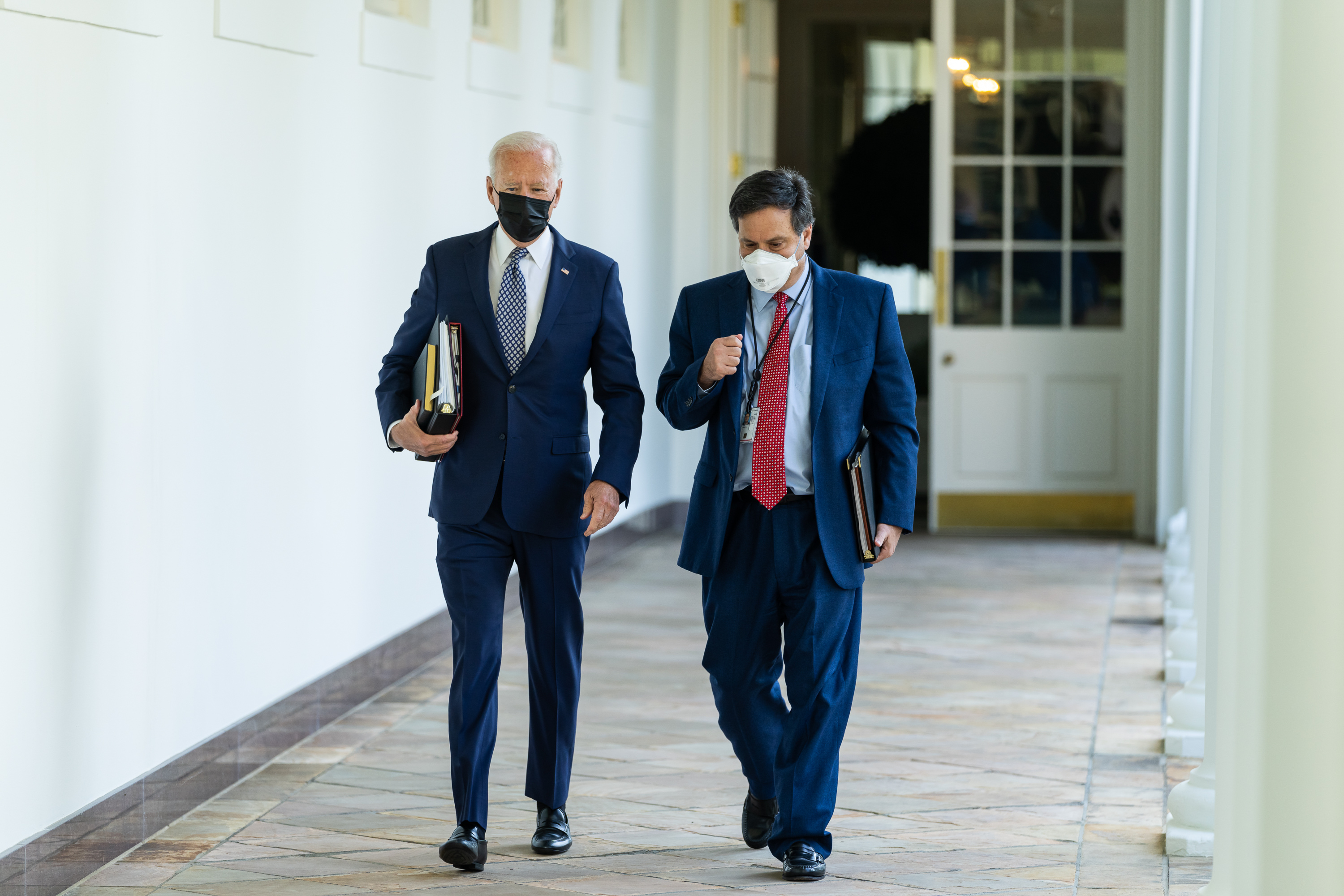
President Joe Biden walks with Chief of Staff Ron Klain along the Colonnade of the White House, in 2021

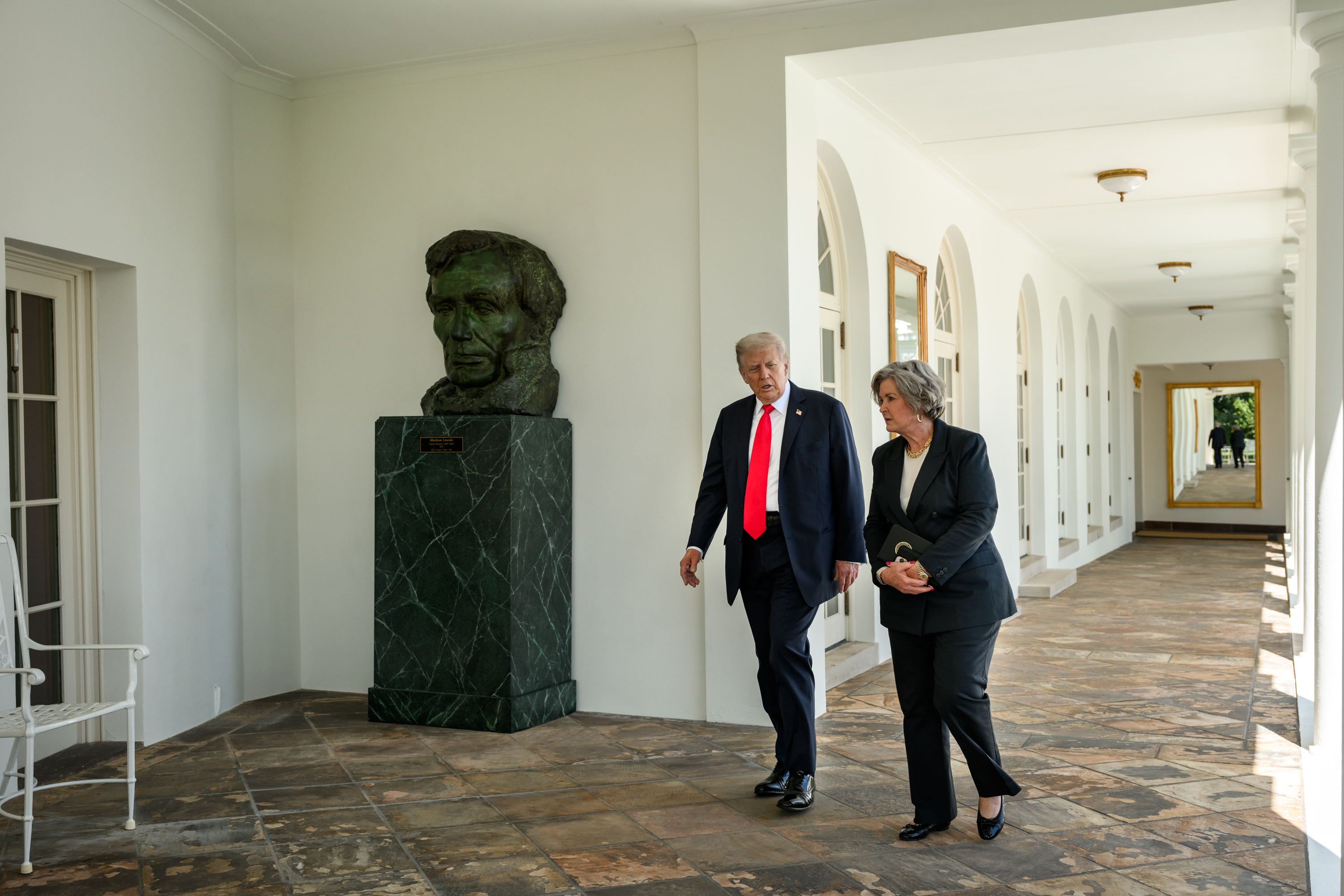
President Donald Trump walks with Chief of Staff Susie Wiles along the Colonnade of the White House, in 2025

The White House chief of staff is the head of the Executive Office of the President of the United States, a position in the federal government of the United States.

The chief of staff is a political appointee of the president of the United States who does not require Senate confirmation, and who serves at the pleasure of the president. While not a legally required role, all presidents since Harry S. Truman have appointed a chief of staff. James Baker is the only person to hold the office twice or serve under two different presidents.

The chief of staff is the most senior political appointee in the White House. The position is widely recognized as one of great power and influence, owing to daily contact with the president of the United States and control of the Executive Office of the President of the United States.

== Historical background ==
Originally, the duties now performed by the chief of staff belonged to the president's private secretary and were fulfilled by crucial confidantes and policy advisers such as George B. Cortelyou, Joseph Tumulty, and Louis McHenry Howe to presidents Theodore Roosevelt, Woodrow Wilson, and Franklin D. Roosevelt, respectively. The private secretary served as the president's de facto chief aide, in a role that combined personal and professional assignments of highly delicate and demanding natures, requiring great skill and utmost discretion. The job of gatekeeper and overseeing the president's schedule was separately delegated to the appointments secretary, as with aide Edwin "Pa" Watson.

From 1933 to 1939, as he greatly expanded the scope of the federal government's policies and powers in response to the Great Depression, President Franklin D. Roosevelt relied on his 'Brain Trust' of top advisers. Although working directly for the president, they were often appointed to vacant positions in federal agencies and departments, whence they drew their salaries since the White House lacked statutory or budgetary authority to create staff positions. It was not until 1939, during Roosevelt's second term in office, that the foundations of the modern White House staff were created using a formal structure. Roosevelt was able to persuade Congress to approve the creation of the Executive Office of the President, which would report directly to the president. During World War II, Roosevelt created the position of "Chief of Staff to the Commander-in-Chief" for his principal military adviser, Fleet Admiral William D. Leahy.

In 1946, in response to the rapid growth of the U.S. government's executive branch, the position of "Assistant to the President of the United States" was established. Charged with the affairs of the White House, it was the immediate predecessor to the modern chief of staff. It was in 1953, under Republican president Dwight D. Eisenhower, that the president's preeminent assistant was designated the "White House chief of staff".

Assistant to the president became a rank generally shared by the chief of staff along with the other most senior presidential aides such as the White House counsel, the White House press secretary, and others. This new system did not catch on immediately however. Presidents Kennedy and Johnson still relied on their appointments secretaries instead, and it was not until the Nixon administration that the chief of staff took over maintenance of the president's schedule. This concentration of power in the Nixon and Ford White House (whose last chief of staff was Dick Cheney) led presidential candidate Jimmy Carter to campaign in 1976 with the promise that he would not appoint a chief of staff. And indeed, for the first two and a half years of his presidency, he appointed no one to the post.

=== Average tenure in office ===
The average tenure for a White House chief of staff is just over 18 months. The inaugural chief of staff, John R. Steelman, under Harry S. Truman, was the president's only chief of staff; Kenneth O'Donnell alone served in the position during John F. Kennedy's unfinished term of 34 months in office. Andrew Card and Denis McDonough each served at least one entire presidential term of office under presidents George W. Bush and Barack Obama, respectively.

== Role ==
Chris Whipple, author of The Gatekeepers: How the White House Chiefs of Staff Define Every Presidency, loosely describes the role of a White House chief of staff through his interview with former president Barack Obama:

During the last days of his presidency, Barack Obama observed: "One of the things I've learned is that the big breakthroughs are typically the result of a lot of grunt work—just a whole lot of blocking and tackling." Grunt work is what chiefs of staff do.

The responsibilities of the chief of staff are both managerial and advisory and may include the following:

- Selecting senior White House staffers and supervising their offices' activities
- Managing and designing the overall structure of the White House staff system
- Control the flow of people into the Oval Office
- Manage the flow of information to and decisions from the Resolute desk (with the White House staff secretary)
- Directing, managing and overseeing all policy development
- Protecting the political interests of the president
- Negotiating legislation and appropriating funds with United States Congress leaders, Cabinet secretaries, and extra-governmental political groups to implement the president's agenda
- Advise on any and usually various issues set by the president

These responsibilities have recently extended to firing of senior staff members. In the case of Omarosa Manigault Newman, who published a tape she alleged was made in the Situation Room of her firing by Chief of Staff John Kelly, the chief of staff said that his decision for her departure was non-negotiable and that "the staff and everyone on the staff works for me and not the president."

Richard Nixon's first chief of staff, H. R. Haldeman, garnered a reputation in Washington for the iron hand he wielded in the position. Referring to himself as "the president's son-of-a-bitch", he was a rigid gatekeeper who would frequently meet with administration officials in place of the president, and then report to Nixon on the officials' talking points himself. Journalist Bob Woodward, in his books All the President's Men (1974) and The Secret Man (2005), wrote that many of his sources, including Mark Felt, later revealed as "Deep Throat", displayed a genuine fear of Haldeman.

== List of White House chiefs of staff ==
Denotes acting capacity.

Name	Start	End	Duration	President(s)
John Steelman	December 12, 1946	January 20, 1953	6 years, 39 days	Harry S. Truman (1945–1953)
Sherman Adams	January 20, 1953	October 7, 1958	5 years, 260 days	Dwight D. Eisenhower (1953–1961)
Wilton Persons	October 7, 1958	January 20, 1961	2 years, 105 days	Dwight D. Eisenhower (1953–1961)
Kenneth O'Donnell; De facto	January 20, 1961	November 22, 1963	2 years, 306 days	John F. Kennedy (1961–1963)
Walter Jenkins; De facto	November 22, 1963	October 14, 1964	327 days	Lyndon B. Johnson (1963–1969)
Bill Moyers; De facto	October 14, 1964	July 8, 1965	267 days	Lyndon B. Johnson (1963–1969)
Jack Valenti; De facto	July 8, 1965	June 1, 1966	328 days	Lyndon B. Johnson (1963–1969)
Marvin Watson; De facto	June 1, 1966	April 26, 1968	1 year, 330 days	Lyndon B. Johnson (1963–1969)
James Jones; De facto	April 26, 1968	January 20, 1969	269 days	Lyndon B. Johnson (1963–1969)
Bob Haldeman	January 20, 1969	April 30, 1973	4 years, 100 days	Richard Nixon (1969–1974)
Vacant	April 30, 1973	May 4, 1973	4 days	Richard Nixon (1969–1974)
Alexander Haig	May 4, 1973	September 21, 1974	1 year, 140 days	Richard Nixon (1969–1974)
Alexander Haig	May 4, 1973	September 21, 1974	1 year, 140 days	Gerald Ford (1974–1977)
Donald Rumsfeld	September 21, 1974	November 20, 1975	1 year, 60 days	Gerald Ford (1974–1977)
Dick Cheney	November 20, 1975	January 20, 1977	1 year, 61 days	Gerald Ford (1974–1977)
Vacant	January 20, 1977	July 18, 1979	2 years, 179 days	Jimmy Carter (1977–1981)
Ham Jordan	July 18, 1979	June 11, 1980	329 days	Jimmy Carter (1977–1981)
Jack Watson	June 11, 1980	January 20, 1981	223 days	Jimmy Carter (1977–1981)
James Baker	January 20, 1981	February 4, 1985	4 years, 15 days	Ronald Reagan (1981–1989)
Don Regan	February 4, 1985	February 27, 1987	2 years, 23 days	Ronald Reagan (1981–1989)
Howard Baker	February 27, 1987	July 1, 1988	1 year, 125 days	Ronald Reagan (1981–1989)
Ken Duberstein	July 1, 1988	January 20, 1989	203 days	Ronald Reagan (1981–1989)
John Sununu	January 20, 1989	December 16, 1991	2 years, 330 days	George H. W. Bush (1989–1993)
Samuel Skinner	December 16, 1991	August 23, 1992	251 days	George H. W. Bush (1989–1993)
James Baker	August 23, 1992	January 20, 1993	150 days	George H. W. Bush (1989–1993)
Mack McLarty	January 20, 1993	July 17, 1994	1 year, 178 days	Bill Clinton (1993–2001)
Leon Panetta	July 17, 1994	January 20, 1997	2 years, 187 days	Bill Clinton (1993–2001)
Erskine Bowles	January 20, 1997	October 20, 1998	1 year, 273 days	Bill Clinton (1993–2001)
John Podesta	October 20, 1998	January 20, 2001	2 years, 92 days	Bill Clinton (1993–2001)
Andy Card	January 20, 2001	April 14, 2006	5 years, 84 days	George W. Bush (2001–2009)
Josh Bolten	April 14, 2006	January 20, 2009	2 years, 281 days	George W. Bush (2001–2009)
Rahm Emanuel	January 20, 2009	October 1, 2010	1 year, 254 days	Barack Obama (2009–2017)
Pete Rouse; Acting	October 1, 2010	January 13, 2011	104 days	Barack Obama (2009–2017)
Bill Daley	January 13, 2011	January 27, 2012	1 year, 14 days	Barack Obama (2009–2017)
Jack Lew	January 27, 2012	January 20, 2013	359 days	Barack Obama (2009–2017)
Denis McDonough	January 20, 2013	January 20, 2017	4 years, 0 days	Barack Obama (2009–2017)
Reince Priebus	January 20, 2017	July 31, 2017	192 days	Donald Trump (2017–2021)
John Kelly	July 31, 2017	January 2, 2019	1 year, 155 days	Donald Trump (2017–2021)
Mick Mulvaney; Acting	January 2, 2019	March 31, 2020	1 year, 89 days	Donald Trump (2017–2021)
Mark Meadows	March 31, 2020	January 20, 2021	295 days	Donald Trump (2017–2021)
Ron Klain	January 20, 2021	February 7, 2023	2 years, 18 days	Joe Biden (2021–2025)
Jeff Zients	February 8, 2023	January 20, 2025	1 year, 347 days	Joe Biden (2021–2025)
Susie Wiles	January 20, 2025	November 6, 2026	1 year, 290 days	Donald Trump (2025–present)
Stephen Miller	November 9, 2026	Incumbent	7 days	Donald Trump (2025–present)

== See also ==
- Chief of staff
- Chief of Staff to the Vice President of the United States
- Officer of the United States
- Staff and line
- White House Deputy Chief of Staff
