= Partners desk =

Double desk for two people

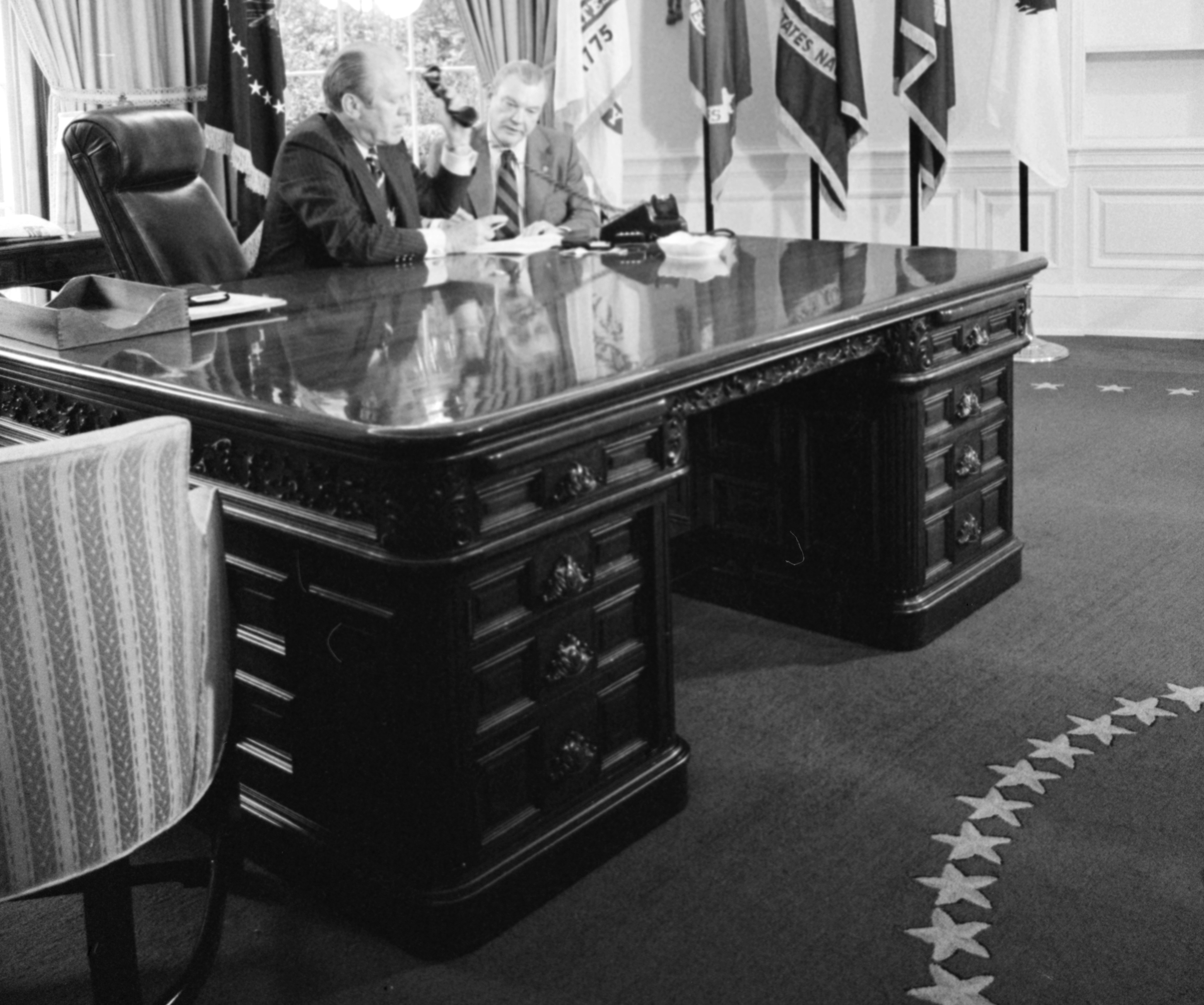
The Wilson Desk in the Oval Office, with Gerald Ford

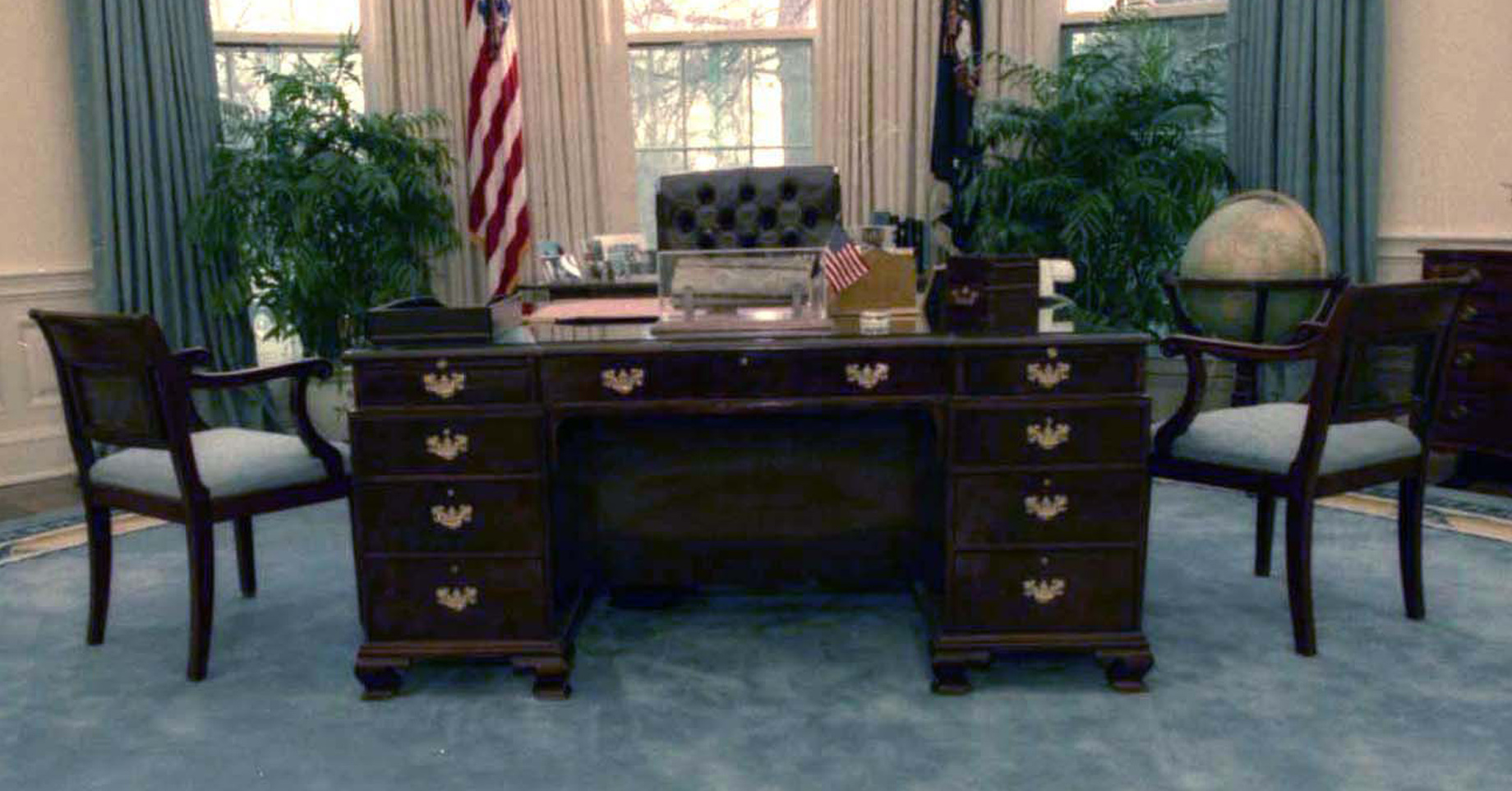
The C&O desk in the Oval Office of the White House

A partners desk, partner's desk or partners' desk (also known as a double desk) is a mostly historical form of desk, a large pedestal desk designed and constructed for two users working while facing each other. The defining features of a partner's desk are a deep top and two sets of drawers, one at each end of the pedestal.

The design evolved from 18th-century library writing tables with drawers on two or more sides.

== See also ==
- List of desk forms and types
