= Vice President's Room =

Room in the United States Capitol

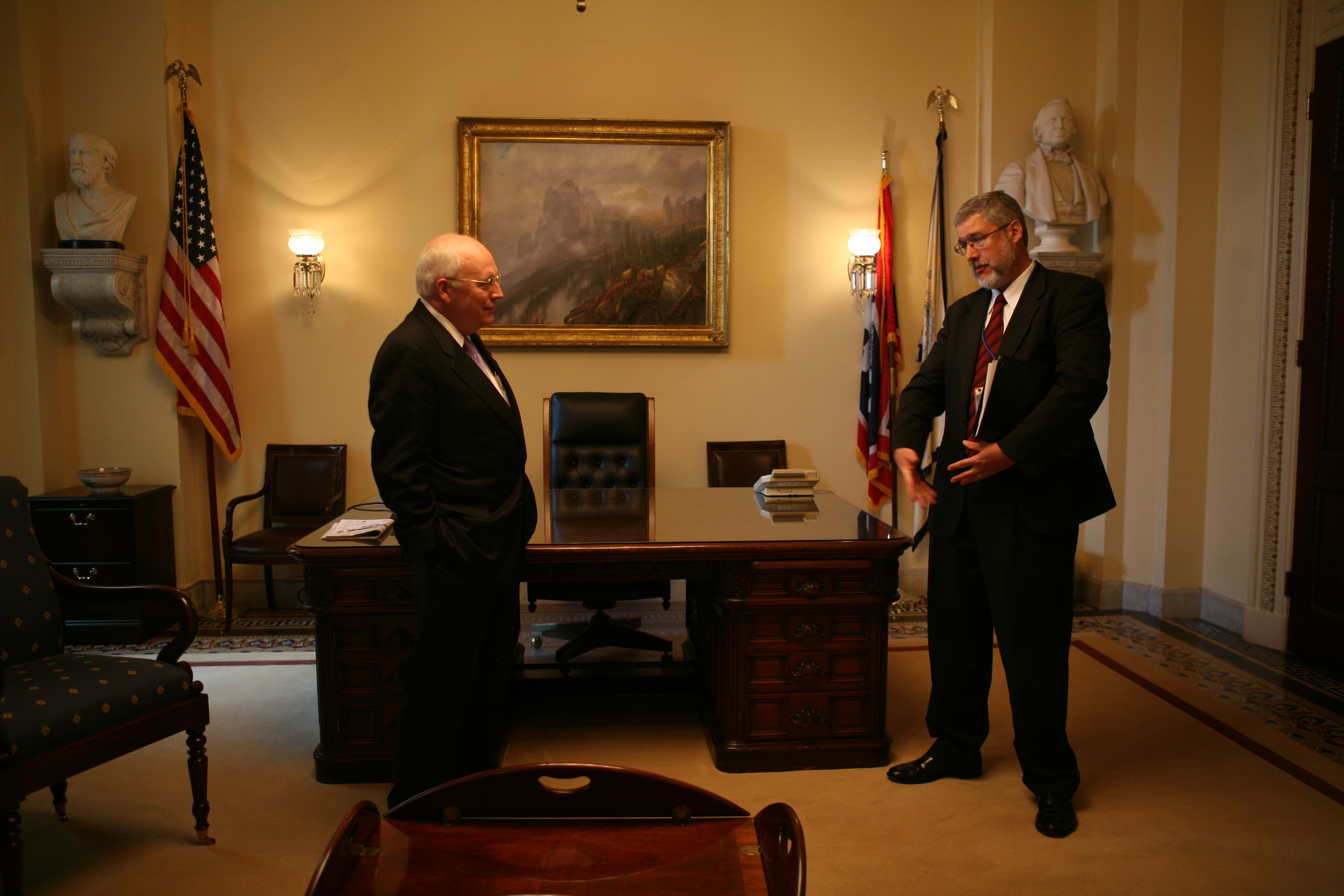
Vice President Dick Cheney talking with David Addington in his Senate office in the United States Capitol (2008)

The Vice President's Room is the vice president's office in the United States Capitol, added during the 1850s expansion.

== History ==
The United States Constitution designates the vice president to serve as president of the Senate and to cast the tie-breaking vote in the case of a deadlock. To carry out these duties, the vice president has long had an office in the Capitol Building, just outside the Senate chamber. Due to lack of space in the Capitol's old Senate wing, early vice presidents often shared their room with the president. Following the 1850s extension of the building, the Senate formally set aside a room for the vice president's exclusive use.

John C. Breckinridge of Kentucky was the first to occupy the new Vice President's Room (S–214), after he gavelled the Senate into session in its new chamber in 1859. Over the years, S–214 has provided a convenient place for the vice president to conduct business while at the Capitol. Until the Russell Senate Office Building opened in 1909, this room was the only space in the city officially assigned to the vice president, and it served as the sole working office for many vice presidents including Hannibal Hamlin, Chester Arthur, and Theodore Roosevelt.

Several notable events have occurred in the Vice President's Room over the years. In 1875, Ulysses S. Grant's vice president Henry Wilson died in the room after suffering a stroke. Six years later, following President James Garfield's assassination, President Chester Arthur took the presidential oath of office here with two former presidents, Ulysses S. Grant and Rutherford B. Hayes, among those attending the ceremony.

In 1919, Vice President Thomas R. Marshall signed the constitutional amendment bill that would grant nationwide suffrage to women once ratified by the states. On April 12, 1945, Vice President Harry S. Truman was on the House side of the Capitol when he received a telephone call informing him to come immediately to the White House. David McCullough wrote in his 1992 biography Truman that the vice president "ran through the echoing old Crypt, past the Senate barber shop, then up a flight of stairs with brass banisters to his office—to get his hat." This marked Truman's last action as vice president. When he arrived at the White House he learned that Franklin Roosevelt had died.

During the 2021 attack on the United States Capitol, Vice President Mike Pence is reported to have taken shelter in the Vice President's Room.

The proximity of the Vice President's Room to the Senate chamber allows the vice president easy access to the members when the Senate is in session. For over 125 years, the room has provided a convenient setting for ceremonial functions, informal party caucuses, press briefings, and private meetings.

== Art ==
The Vice President's Room was initially furnished in a modest style. Few of those original pieces exist today, but the marble mantel and colorful Minton floor tiles manufactured in England are both part of the room's first decoration. Many of the room's present furnishings, such as the gilded mirror and the matching Victorian window cornices, date to the late 19th century.

Of all the 19th century vice presidents who occupied this room, none affected its style and decoration as significantly as Garret Augustus Hobart, who won election in 1896. Senate vouchers detail his purchases of imported silk mohair carpeting, Neapolitan silk curtains, numerous Persian throw rugs, and "a silk velour slumber robe" made to order to match the velour cushions on his office sofa.

The double-pedestal, mahogany desk in the room is called the Wilson desk, due to once considered associations with Vice President Henry Wilson and President Woodrow Wilson. Every vice president from Hobart to Lyndon Johnson used it. In 1969, it was loaned to the White House as the Oval Office desk for presidents Nixon and Ford. It was returned in 1977.

The Senate purchased the floor clock in 1898 from Washington jewelers Harris and Schafer for $600. Vice President John Nance Garner used it to time his entrance into the Senate chamber. As the chimes rang fifteen seconds before twelve, he stopped what he was doing and reached his seat precisely at noon.

The small gilded mirror has been displayed in the room since the completion of the Senate extension in 1859. It was most likely transferred from the old Senate wing. Although various legends attribute the mirror's original ownership to John Adams or Dolley Madison, but no documentation exists, and the mirror's origin remains a mystery.

The ornately carved rosewood cabinet dates from the late 19th century, later some call it the "John Nance Garner Liquor Cabinet", because he invited visitors to "strike a blow for liberty" with its contents. Among the objects displayed on its shelves is a sterling silver desk set that was presented by the Senate to Vice President Adlai Stevenson in 1897, and donated to the Senate by former Illinois Senator Adlai E. Stevenson III.

In 1885, the Senate voted to place a marble bust of Henry Wilson in the Vice President's Room, to honor one of the Senate's most popular presiding officers. Before being elected vice president, Wilson had served as a senator from Massachusetts from 1855 to 1873. He played an important role during the Civil War, as chairman of the Senate Military Affairs Committee, and throughout his career championed legislation to aid the working class. The Wilson bust served as the genesis for the Senate's Vice Presidential Bust Collection, displayed in the Senate chamber gallery and on the second floor of the Capitol's Senate wing.
