= Wilson desk =

Oval Office desk

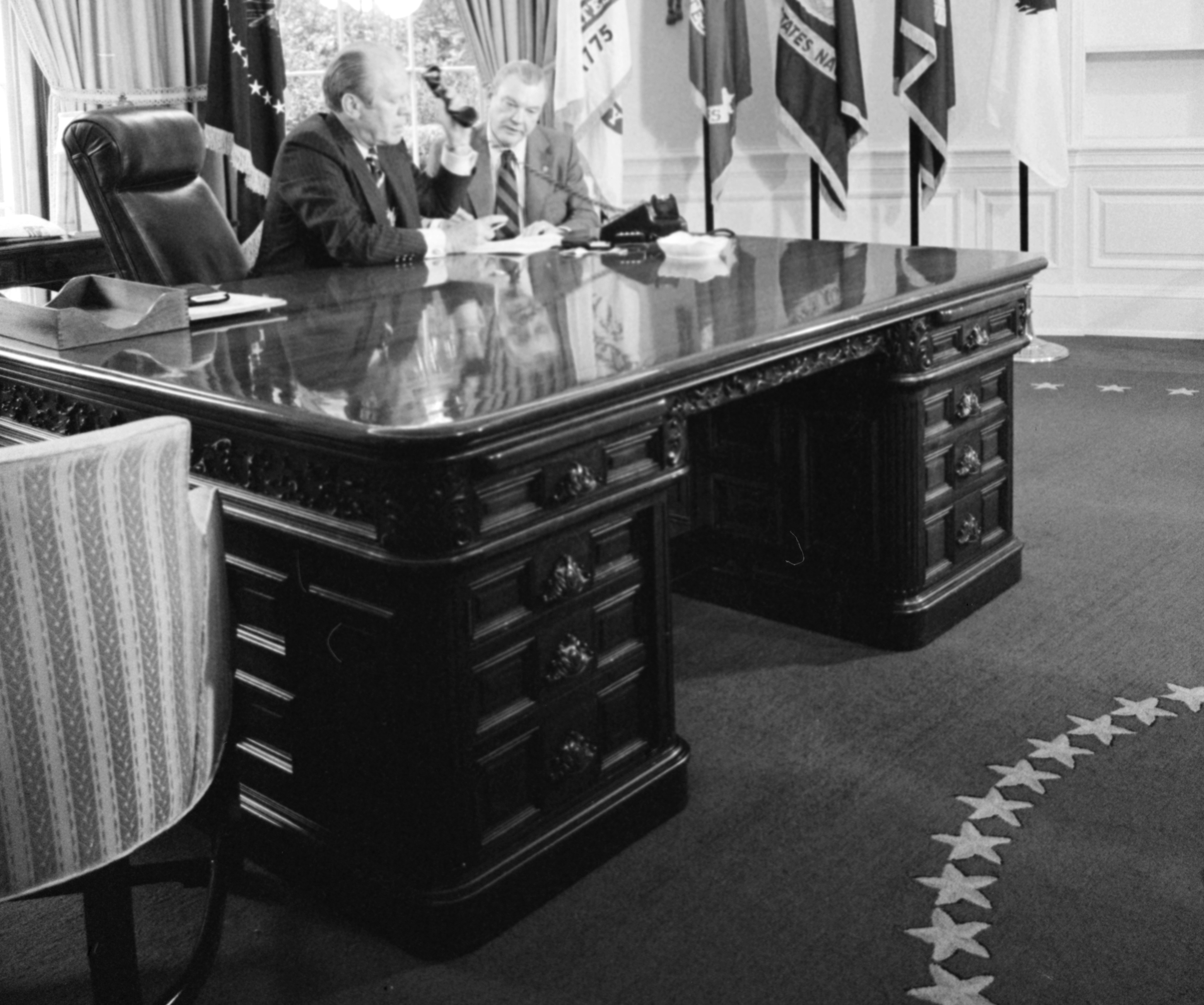
- Gerald Ford sitting at the Wilson Desk with George Meany in 1974, before his redesign of the Oval Office décor
- Date: 1898
- Materials: Mahogany
- Sold by: W. B. Moses and Sons
- Height: 31 in (79 cm)
- Width: 80.75 in (205.1 cm)
- Depth: 58.25 in (148.0 cm)
- Collection: United States Senate

The desk in the Vice President's Room of the United States Capitol, colloquially known as the Wilson desk and previously called the McKinley-Barkley desk, is a large mahogany partners desk used by U.S. presidents Richard Nixon and Gerald Ford in the Oval Office as their Oval Office desk. One of only six desks used by a President in the Oval Office, it was purchased in 1898 by Garret Augustus Hobart, the 24th vice president of the United States, for the Vice President's Room in the United States Capitol.

Nixon chose this desk for the Oval Office because of his mistaken belief that former president Woodrow Wilson had used it there. In 1971 Nixon had five recording devices secretly installed in the Wilson desk by the United States Secret Service. These recordings constitute some of the Watergate tapes. Upon Jimmy Carter's ascent to the presidency, he moved the Wilson desk back to the Vice President's Room, preferring to work at the Resolute desk.

Nixon referred to the desk in 1969 in his "silent majority" speech, stating: "Fifty years ago, in this room and at this very desk, President Woodrow Wilson spoke words which caught the imagination of a war-weary world." In actuality, the desk was never used by Wilson in the Oval office. Nixon was informed by one of his speech writers, William Safire, that the desk was actually used by Vice President Henry Wilson during President Ulysses S. Grant's administration. This is also untrue since the desk was purchased 23 years after the former's death.

== Design and markings ==
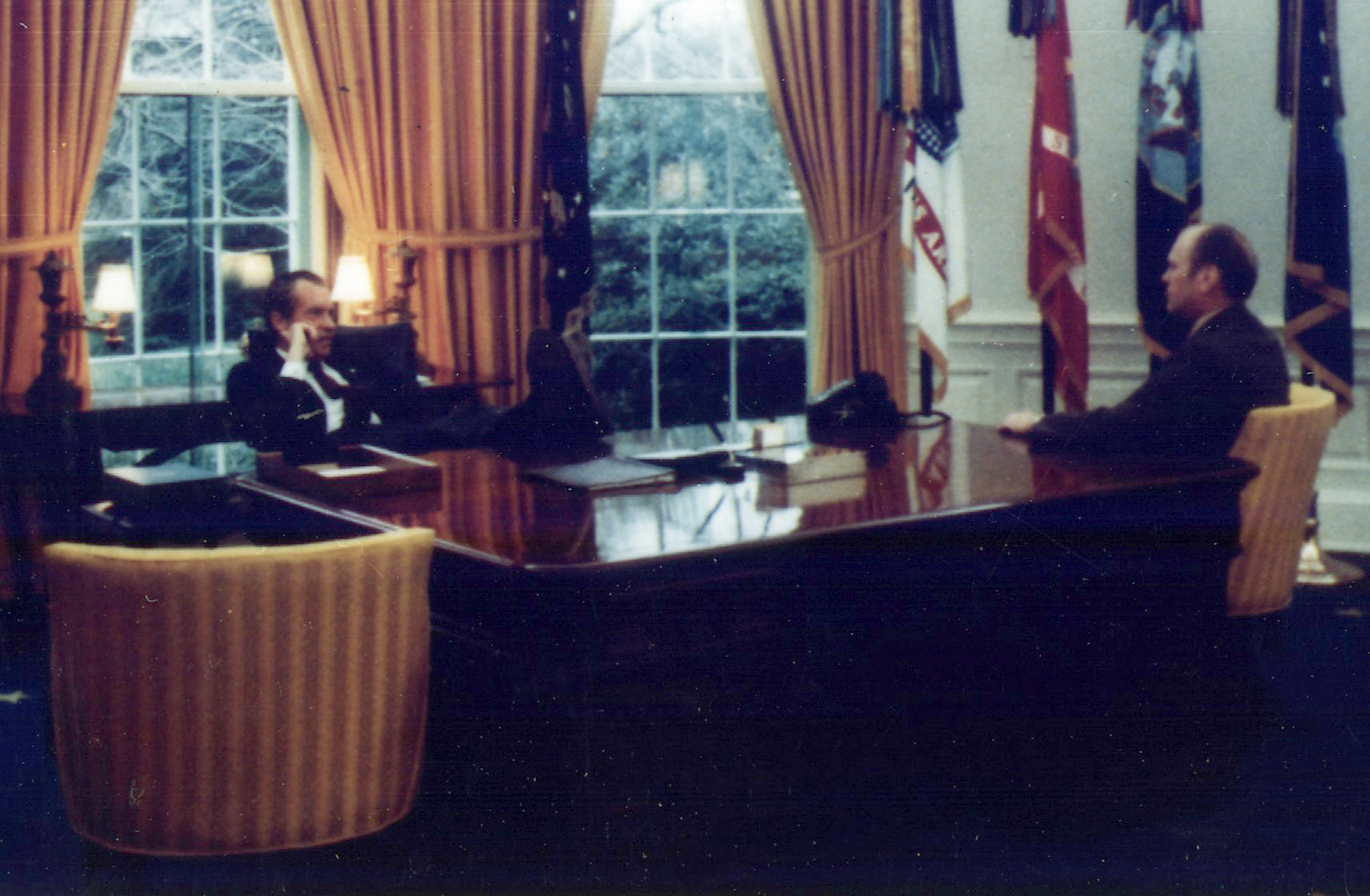
Richard Nixon and Gerald Ford at the Wilson desk showing Nixon with his feet on the desk

The Wilson desk is a mahogany double-pedestal desk with ornate carving. The 31 in (79 cm) high desk has a workspace which is 80.75 in (205.1 cm) wide and 58.25 in (148.0 cm) deep. The knee-hole extends all the way through the desk and both pedestals contain drawers on both the front and back of the units. During its time in the White House the desk featured a glass top which was placed to protect its work surface.

The desk bears a property decal from the sergeant at arms of the United States Senate and is numbered S-4966. Within the kneehole area there is a small wooden box affixed to the desk where a button was installed that allowed Richard Nixon to turn on recording devices. The button no longer exists but its location is still apparent.

According to the book Presidential Anecdotes by Paul F. Boller, Nixon enjoyed working in the Oval Office with his feet propped up on the Wilson desk and, in spite of the glass cover, Nixon's "...heels began leaving scars on the top of it." Someone at the White House noticed the marring of the historic desk and, while Nixon was out of the United States, had it refinished. When Nixon returned and saw what had been done he supposedly stated, "Dammit. I didn't order that. I want to leave my mark on this place just like other Presidents!"

== History ==
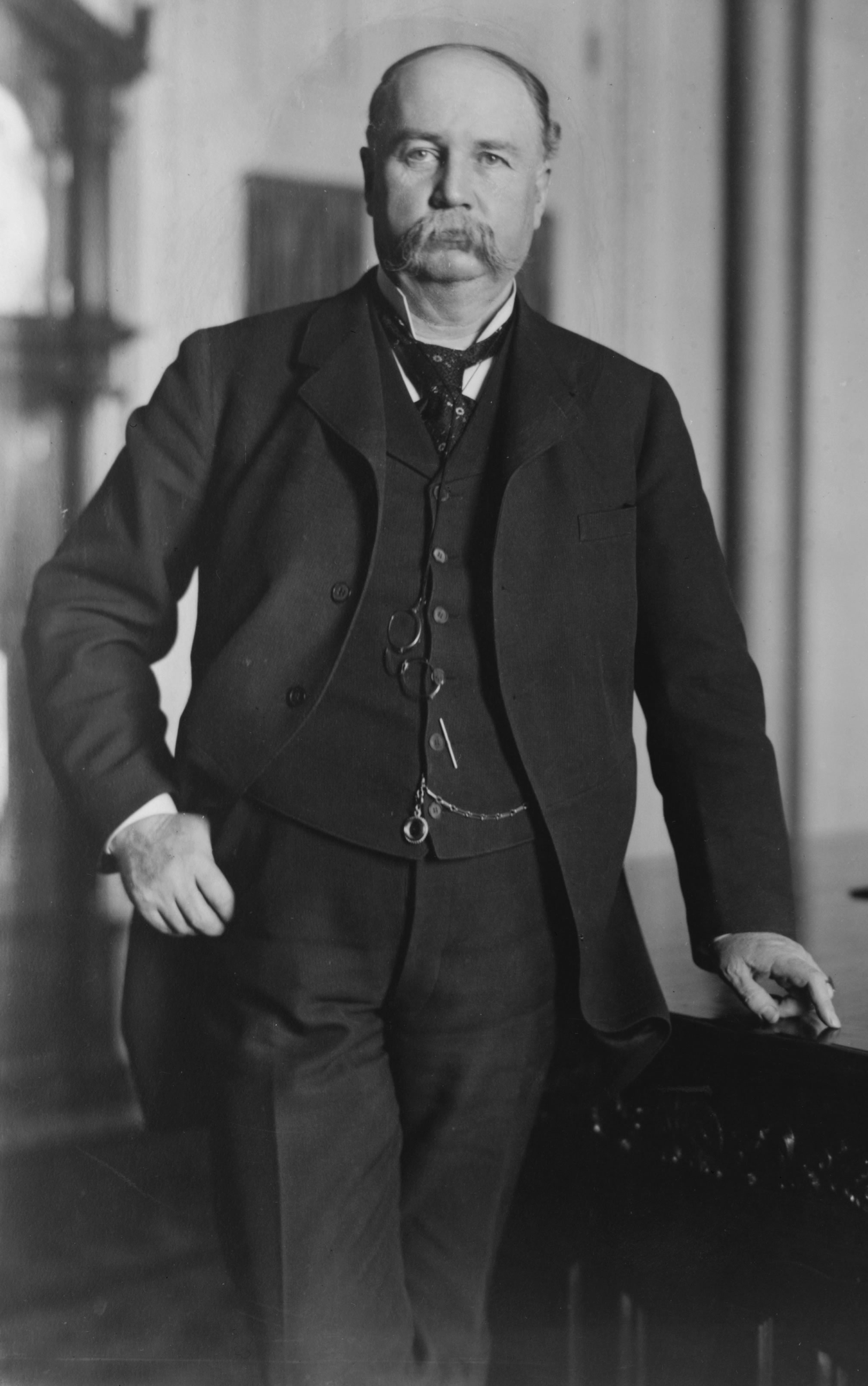
Garret Augustus Hobart in the Vice President's Room of the United States Capitol leaning on the Wilson desk

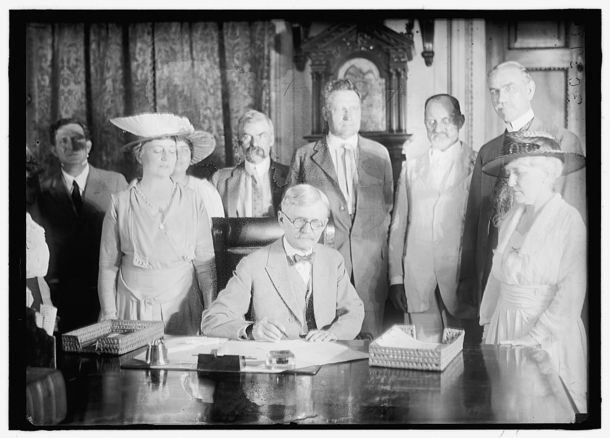
Thomas R. Marshall seated at the Wilson desk signing the Nineteenth Amendment to the United States Constitution

Garret Augustus Hobart, the 24th vice president of the United States, served from 1897 to 1899 under President William McKinley. While in office he purchased and ordered many lavish furnishings for the Vice President's Room of the United States Capitol (room S–214), then the official office for the vice president. The furnishings either purchased or ordered by Hobart included Persian rugs, mohair carpeting, Neapolitan silk curtains, "a silk velour slumber robe" to match the velour cushions on his office sofa, a $600 (equivalent to $23,220 in 2025) floor clock from Harris and Schafer jewelers, and a large mahogany desk, now known as the Wilson desk.

The desk was likely ordered in 1898 from W. B. Moses and Sons by Hobart. According to the United States Senate Curator's Office, W. B. Moses and Sons was, at the time, "the largest exclusively retail furniture, carpet, and drapery business in the nation." W. B. Moses and Sons also provided other furniture for the Senate around this time including eight benches for the United States Senate Reception Room.

Over the next few decades the desk remained in the Vice President's Room and continued to be used by each Vice President of the United States there. The Vice President's Room saw many ceremonial functions, caucuses, press briefings, and meetings during this time. On June 4, 1919, Vice President Thomas R. Marshall signed the Nineteenth Amendment to the United States Constitution on this desk, which granted women the right to vote, and in 1937 Vice President John Nance Garner set aside April 6 as National Army Day by signing a resolution on the Wilson desk.

Alben W. Barkley, the U.S. vice president from 1949 to 1953, asserted in his 1954 autobiography that the desk in the Senate office for the vice president was once used by presidents McKinley and Woodrow Wilson, referring to it as the "Mc-Kinley-Wilson desk".

In 1953, Richard Nixon succeeded Barkley as vice president and used this desk throughout his tenure, believing likewise it had been previously used by presidents McKinley and Wilson. Nixon was an admirer of Woodrow Wilson and believed this desk was used by him during his term as president. He had traced the provenance to President Wilson based on an assumption that it was a desk originally used by McKinley but withdrawn after his assassination; afterwards, the desk was asserted to have been used by President Wilson for his two terms before finally being moved to the vice president's office.

A 1974 document created by the White House Office of the Curator states in 1965 the Vice Presidents Room was handed over to Hubert Humphrey who refurbished the space and had the desk placed in storage for the four years he used the room. This official accounting of the history of the desk is in conflict with a 1963 television interview with Lady Bird Johnson where she shows the desk in then vice president Lyndon B. Johnson's office at his ranch in Texas.

In this interview Lady Bird discusses how the desk ended up at the ranch. She explains the desk, "was used in the Capitol for a great many years, then his office force went in together and bought it for him when it was declared surplus available." Richard Reeves also states in his book President Nixon: Alone in the White House that Johnson had the desk shipped to Texas to use in his office there.

James Davies, the gardener at the Johnsons' house in Texas, stated in an oral history of the office, within the 1987 Historic Structure Report of the building, that when Johnson was inaugurated as vice president a new desk was moved into the office, and a different desk was moved in when he became president. This recalling of desks is in conflict with a picture the Lyndon Baines Johnson Library and Museum has of Johnson sitting at the desk in his office on April 17, 1965, which was after his second inauguration. In 1967 the General Services Administration refinished a desk and chair in Johnson's office at his ranch. It is unclear which desk this was.

On January 20, 1969, when he became president, Nixon called then-Senate minority leader Everett Dirksen requesting the "Wilson desk" from the Capitol. The desk was placed on loan to the White House, was returned to Washington from Texas, and became the Oval Office desk for his presidency. It was known at that point as the McKinley-Barkley desk.

Nixon had a secret audio recording system installed in the Wilson desk in February 1971. The president's offices in the White House, Camp David, and the Old Executive Office Building all had hidden microphones installed by the United States Secret Service. Some of the recordings created by this system make up the Watergate tapes, a series of secret tape recordings revealed to exist during the 1973-74 Watergate scandal. Nixon's refusal to release the tapes formed one of the article of impeachment against him.

There were seven microphones in total installed in the Oval Office, one on either side of the fireplace and five located within the Wilson desk. These microphones, as well as recording devices in the Cabinet Room, were all wired to central mixers and recorders in "an old locker room in the White House basement." Not long after April 9, 1973, a switch was installed in the desk to allow Nixon to turn the microphones on and off at will. Previously they turned on automatically whenever someone began talking. A total of 502 tapes were recorded on these microphones, as well as two by the Oval Office fireplace, while the system was in existence, between February 16, 1971, and July 12, 1973.

Throughout Nixon's presidency he referred to the Wilson desk hundreds of times in official speeches, such as the "silent majority" speech, and in talks with high ranking visitors. During official White House tours, guides wrongly told of how Woodrow Wilson used the desk. This misconception was first discovered to be untrue by an assistant curator at the White House. This assistant curator came to yet another incorrect conclusion about who had previously used the desk. This curator wrongly stated that the desk was not used by Woodrow Wilson, but instead by Vice President Henry Wilson, under President Ulysses S. Grant's administration. The assistant curator informed Cecilia Bellinger, a chief researcher in the writing operation at the White House, about the mistake. Belinger in turn told William Safire, one of Nixon's speech writers. It fell to Safire to inform Nixon about the mistake in the desk's provenance.

Fifty years ago, in this room and at this very desk, President Woodrow Wilson spoke words which caught the imagination of a war-weary world.

— Richard Nixon, "Silent majority" speech

Later research indicated that the desk had not been Woodrow Wilson's as had long been assumed but was used by Vice President Henry Wilson during President Grant's Administration.

— Footnote on page 909 of 1969 edition of Public Papers of the Presidents

Safire was chosen to inform the president of the issue because he was "the most frequent Wilson-quoter on the writing staff". Safire wrote a memo to Nixon explaining that it was Henry Wilson, not Woodrow Wilson, who sat at the desk, and listed a litany of Henry Wilson's character traits and virtues. Safire heard nothing back from the White House about the memo. The only recognition Nixon's White House gave to their major mistake in the provenance of the desk was in 1969 when on page 909 of that year's edition of Public Papers of the Presidents there is a footnote to Nixon's "silent majority" speech which states, "Later research indicated that the desk had not been Woodrow Wilson's as had long been assumed but was used by Vice President Henry Wilson during President Grant's Administration." This is also untrue as the desk was purchased 23 years after Henry Wilson's death.

After Nixon's resignation from office on August 9, 1974, Gerald Ford redecorated the Oval Office. The redesign extended to changing out artworks, rugs, window treatments, and he even oversaw the removal of secret sliding door entrances into the room. On August 16, 1974, a memo was sent from Frank R. Pagnotta to Counselor to the President Robert Hartmann explaining the various desks in the White House that were at the presidents disposal for the Oval Office. This memo erroneously claimed that, "President Grant's Vice President, Henry Wilson, fell ill... and died on the couch next to the desk in 1875. From its use by Vice President Wilson it took the name 'Wilson desk.'" On the 28th a response was made to this memo quoting Ford saying, "Let's keep what we have presently."

In February 1975 the Senate asked for the desk to be returned, not realizing it was being used by President Ford. Once informed it was being used in the Oval Office the request was delayed until Ford left office. When Jimmy Carter became president in 1977 he replaced the Wilson desk with the more widely known Resolute desk. According to Carter the first decision he made in the Oval Office was to replace the Wilson desk with the Resolute desk. Carter states, in his memoir, "On the first day... I sat down at the President's desk and looked it over. It was a surprise to see that it was not the same one which had been photographed when John Kennedy was there, with his little son peeping out from the door underneath. My first decision: to replace this desk with the one I remembered." The Wilson desk was returned to the Vice President's Room at this time, where it has remained in use since.

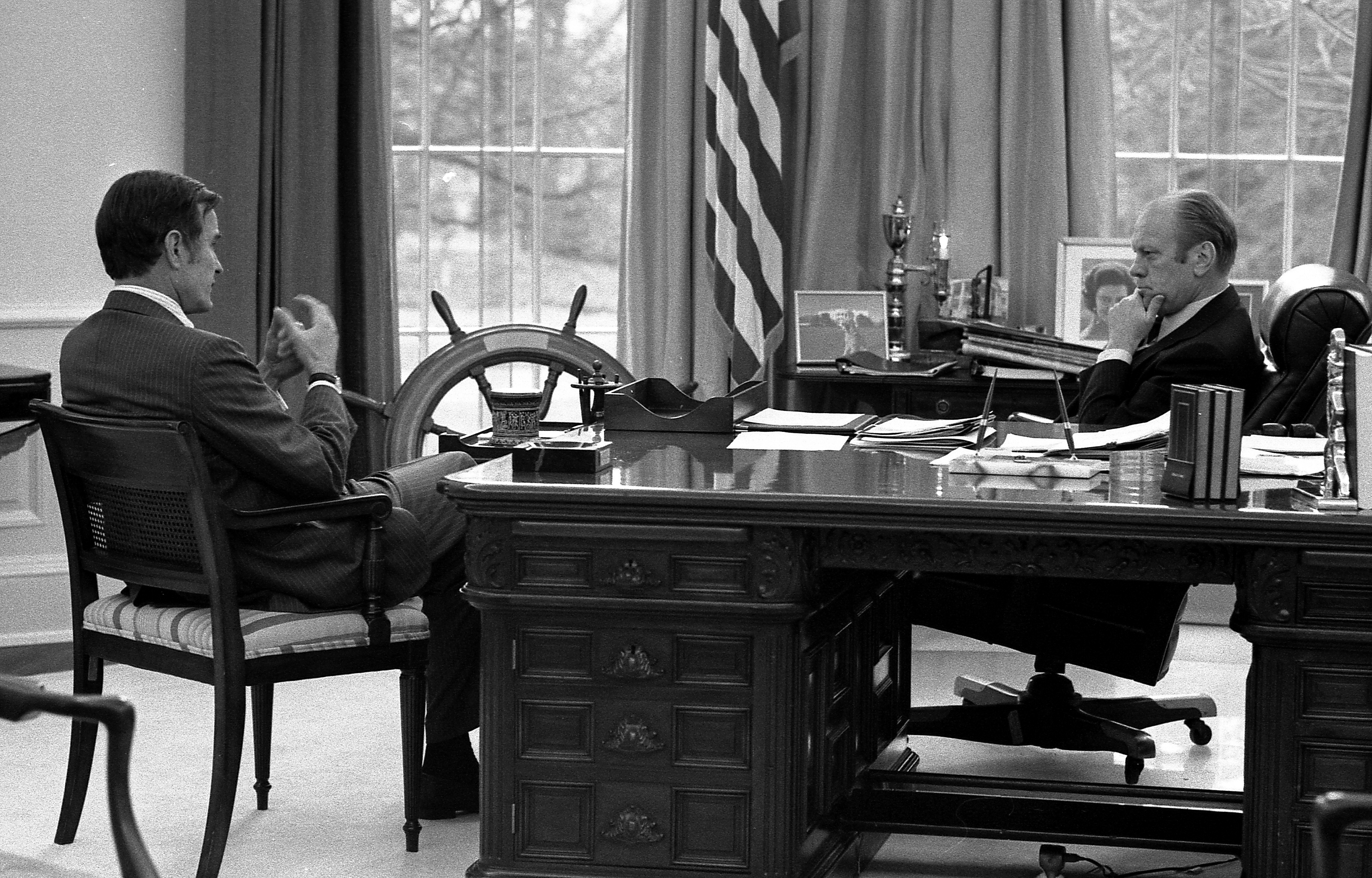
President Gerald Ford meeting with CIA director-designate George H. W. Bush at the Wilson desk

The Vice President's Room and the Wilson desk are now used infrequently by vice presidents, largely when they must come to the Senate floor to cast a tiebreaking vote. These votes are so rare that since the desk was returned to the Vice Presidents Room, two vice presidents, Dan Quayle and Joe Biden, did not have the opportunity to cast any tie breaking votes. While not a popular room, it is still in use. Walter Mondale was known to crawl under the desk with visitors to show the screw holes and other markings left by the controls to Nixon's recording system. Dick Cheney saw working with the Senate as a much higher priority than previous vice presidents and used the Vice President's Room and the Wilson desk every week.

During the two time periods the Wilson desk was located in the Vice President's Room, before and after it was loaned to the White House, no vice president had the last name of "Wilson". Because of this, the "Wilson desk" has never had a "Wilson" use it on a regular basis, but a marble bust of Henry Wilson, the vice president mistakenly believed to have used the Wilson desk, does sit in the Vice President's Office near the Wilson desk. This bust, commissioned in 1885, "served as the genesis for the Senate's Vice Presidential Bust Collection".

== Timeline ==
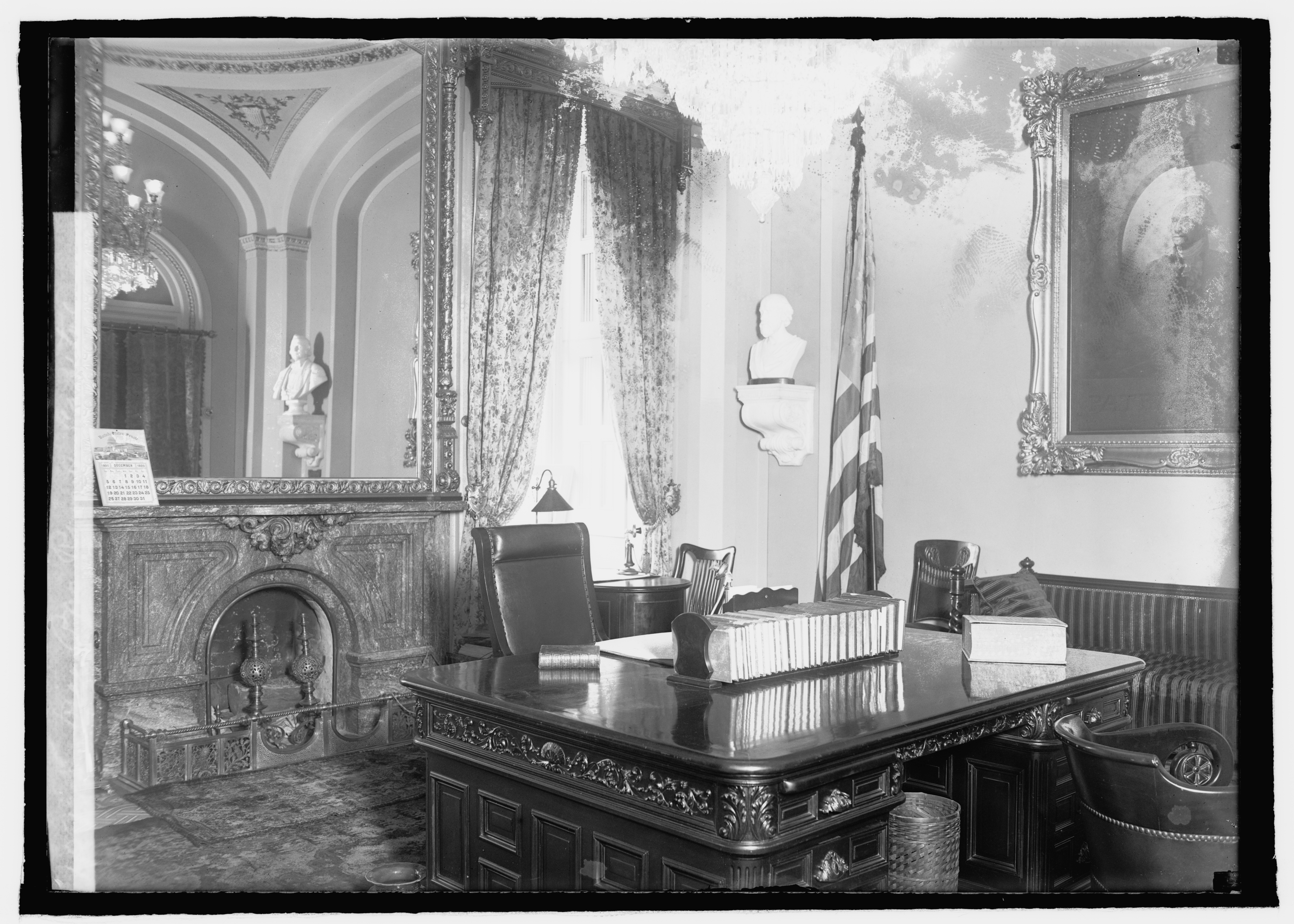
The Wilson desk in the Vice President's Room of the United States Capitol, 1920

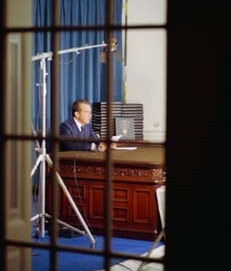
President Nixon at the Wilson desk giving a televised address explaining release of edited transcripts of the Watergate tapes, April 29, 1974

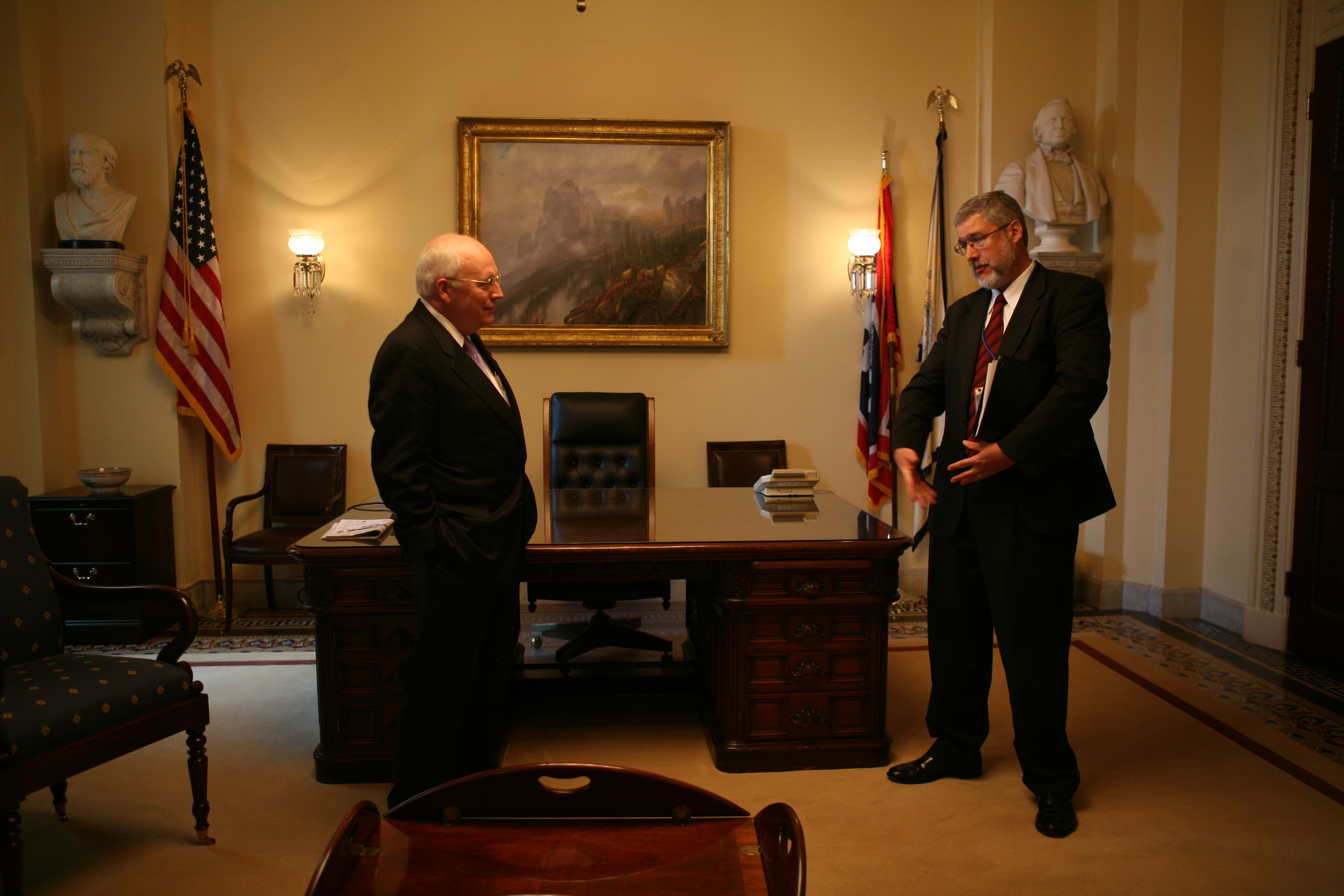
Dick Cheney and David Addington stand in front of the Wilson desk, 2008.

Below is a table with the location of the desk from its purchase by Garret Augustus Hobart to present day and each tenant of the desk.

| Tenant | Location | Dates | Ref. |
|---|---|---|---|
| Garret Hobart | Vice President's Room; United States Capitol | c. 1898–1963 | |
| Theodore Roosevelt | Vice President's Room; United States Capitol | c. 1898–1963 | |
| Charles W. Fairbanks | Vice President's Room; United States Capitol | c. 1898–1963 | |
| James S. Sherman | Vice President's Room; United States Capitol | c. 1898–1963 | |
| Thomas R. Marshall | Vice President's Room; United States Capitol | c. 1898–1963 | |
| Calvin Coolidge | Vice President's Room; United States Capitol | c. 1898–1963 | |
| Charles G. Dawes | Vice President's Room; United States Capitol | c. 1898–1963 | |
| Charles Curtis | Vice President's Room; United States Capitol | c. 1898–1963 | |
| John Nance Garner | Vice President's Room; United States Capitol | c. 1898–1963 | |
| Henry A. Wallace | Vice President's Room; United States Capitol | c. 1898–1963 | |
| Harry S. Truman | Vice President's Room; United States Capitol | c. 1898–1963 | |
| Alben W. Barkley | Vice President's Room; United States Capitol | c. 1898–1963 | |
| Richard Nixon | Vice President's Room; United States Capitol | c. 1898–1963 | |
| Lyndon B. Johnson | Texas White House; Johnson City, Texas | 1963–1969 | |
| Richard Nixon | Oval Office; White House | 1969–1977 | |
| Gerald Ford | Oval Office; White House | 1969–1977 | |
| Walter Mondale | Vice President's Room; United States Capitol | 1977–present | |
| George H. W. Bush | Vice President's Room; United States Capitol | 1977–present | |
| Dan Quayle | Vice President's Room; United States Capitol | 1977–present | |
| Al Gore | Vice President's Room; United States Capitol | 1977–present | |
| Dick Cheney | Vice President's Room; United States Capitol | 1977–present | |
| Joe Biden | Vice President's Room; United States Capitol | 1977–present | |
| Mike Pence | Vice President's Room; United States Capitol | 1977–present | |
| Kamala Harris | Vice President's Room; United States Capitol | 1977–present | |
| JD Vance | Vice President's Room; United States Capitol | 1977–present | |

== Replicas ==
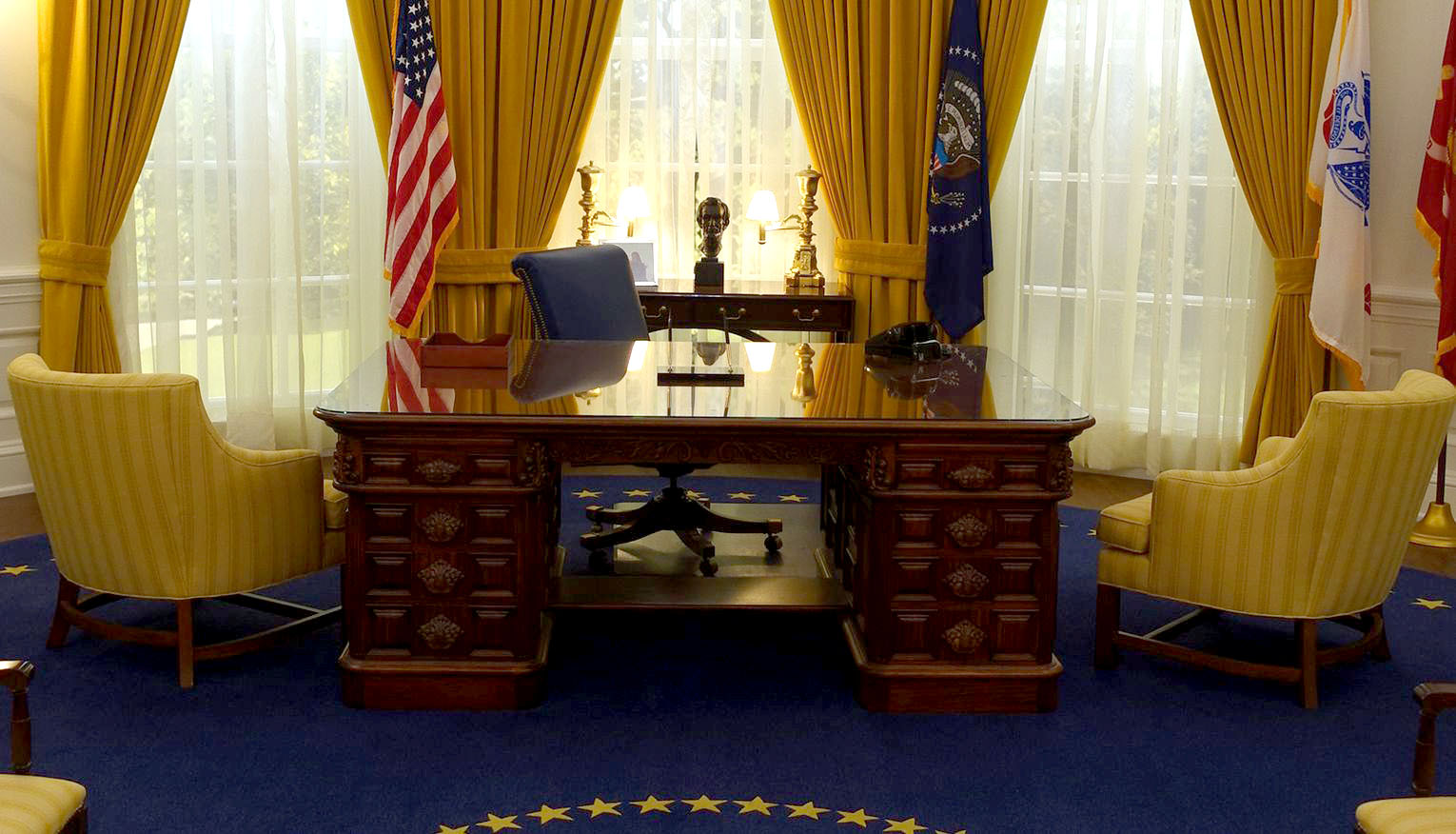
The replica Wilson desk at the Richard Nixon Presidential Library and Museum

There are two replicas of the Wilson desk, both of which reside in replica Oval Offices in presidential libraries. The Richard Nixon Presidential Library and Museum, located in Yorba Linda, California features a replica of the Wilson desk as part of their full-scale recreation of President Nixon's Oval Office. Visitors can approach the replica and have their picture taken with it. A second replica of the Wilson desk is located in the Gerald R. Ford Presidential Museum, in Grand Rapids, Michigan, as a part of a full-scale replica of the Oval Office furnished as it was during Ford's presidency.
