= Louis Rorimer =

American artist and furniture designer (1872–1939)

- Born: September 12, 1872; Cleveland, Ohio
- Died: November 30, 1939 (aged 67)
- Education: Königliche Kunstgewerbeschule München, École nationale supérieure des arts décoratifs, Académie Julian
- Known for: interior design, architectural design, furniture design, decorative arts

Louis Rorimer (September 12, 1872 – November 30, 1939) was an American artist, an instructor at the Cleveland School of Art, and the founder of Rorimer-Brooks Co.

== Life ==
Louis Rohrheimer was born to Minnie and Jacob Rohrheimer in 1872, the youngest of seven children. At the age of sixteen, Rohrheimer left to study in Europe at the Königliche Kunstgewerbeschule München in Munich and the École nationale supérieure des arts décoratifs and Académie Julian in Paris. Rohrheimer returned to Cleveland in 1893, founded Rohrheimer Design in 1896, and taught at the Cleveland School of Art from 1898 to 1936. He married Edith Joseph in 1903, and had two children Louise and James. Rohrheimer changed his name to Rorimer in 1917 due to anti-German and anti-Jewish sentiment. That same year he purchased the Brooks Household Arts Co. and merged it with his own studio to create the Rorimer-Brooks Studios or Rorimer Brooks Co.

In 1939 he signed the affidavits (sponsorship papers) that allowed his cousins Stephen and Erna Rossmer and their daughter Gaby who were fleeing Nazi Germany to enter the United States and settle in New York.

== Work ==
Rorimer produced furniture in a variety of styles. He appreciated Art Deco, but as a businessman focused on his clients' tastes. Rorimer displayed 25 articles of furniture at the Cleveland May Show between 1919 and 1926. The Cleveland Museum of Art holds a silver tea set from the Rorimer Studios in its collection.
