= Oval Office Study =

Suite of private rooms adjoining the Oval Office in the West Wing of the White House

Coordinates: 38.897370°N 77.037424°W

The Oval Office Study is part of a suite of private rooms directly adjoining the Oval Office in the West Wing of the White House. This suite includes the president's private study, a small guest dining room, a hallway, and a private lavatory. These rooms are accessed via an internal corridor and are not part of the publicly visible areas of the White House. Together, they serve as a secluded working and resting area for the president, distinct from the ceremonial and public functions of the Oval Office.

== President's Study ==
The President's Study is a small working office located immediately adjacent to the Oval Office. Historically, it has served as a private workspace for presidents since the modern West Wing was established. The room was used as a study by presidents Lyndon B. Johnson, Gerald Ford, Ronald Reagan, George H. W. Bush, Bill Clinton, George W. Bush, Barack Obama, and Joe Biden.

During the Clinton administration, the study gained public attention when it was revealed as the location where President Bill Clinton engaged in aspects of his affair with Monica Lewinsky, leading to a significant political scandal and eventual impeachment proceedings.

According to former speaker of the House Kevin McCarthy, during President Donald Trump's first term, he referred to the room as a "gift shop", a claim repeated by comedian Bill Maher during Trump's second term. Unlike during the first term, there are many photos of President Trump's gift shop from his second term.

== Private Dining Room ==
The Private Dining Room, located adjacent to the study, is a small private space traditionally used for meals or meetings with close advisors. It has also served multiple functions over the decades. President Jimmy Carter repurposed it as a working office. Earlier, it had been used by President Richard Nixon's and President John F. Kennedy's secretaries. During the Harry S. Truman administration, the room was occupied by his chief of staff, John R. Steelman.

During the Trump administration, the room was used simultaneously as a dining space and an informal office, where Trump often conducted business, watched television, or held private conversations. Notably, the painting The Republican Club—featuring Trump alongside past Republican presidents—hung on the wall, symbolizing the room's personalized transformation during his term.

== Gallery ==
Images of the Oval Office Study
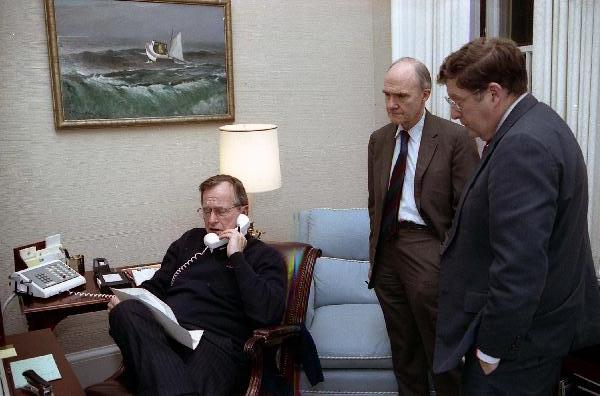
George H. W. Bush speaks into a telephone in the Oval Office Study

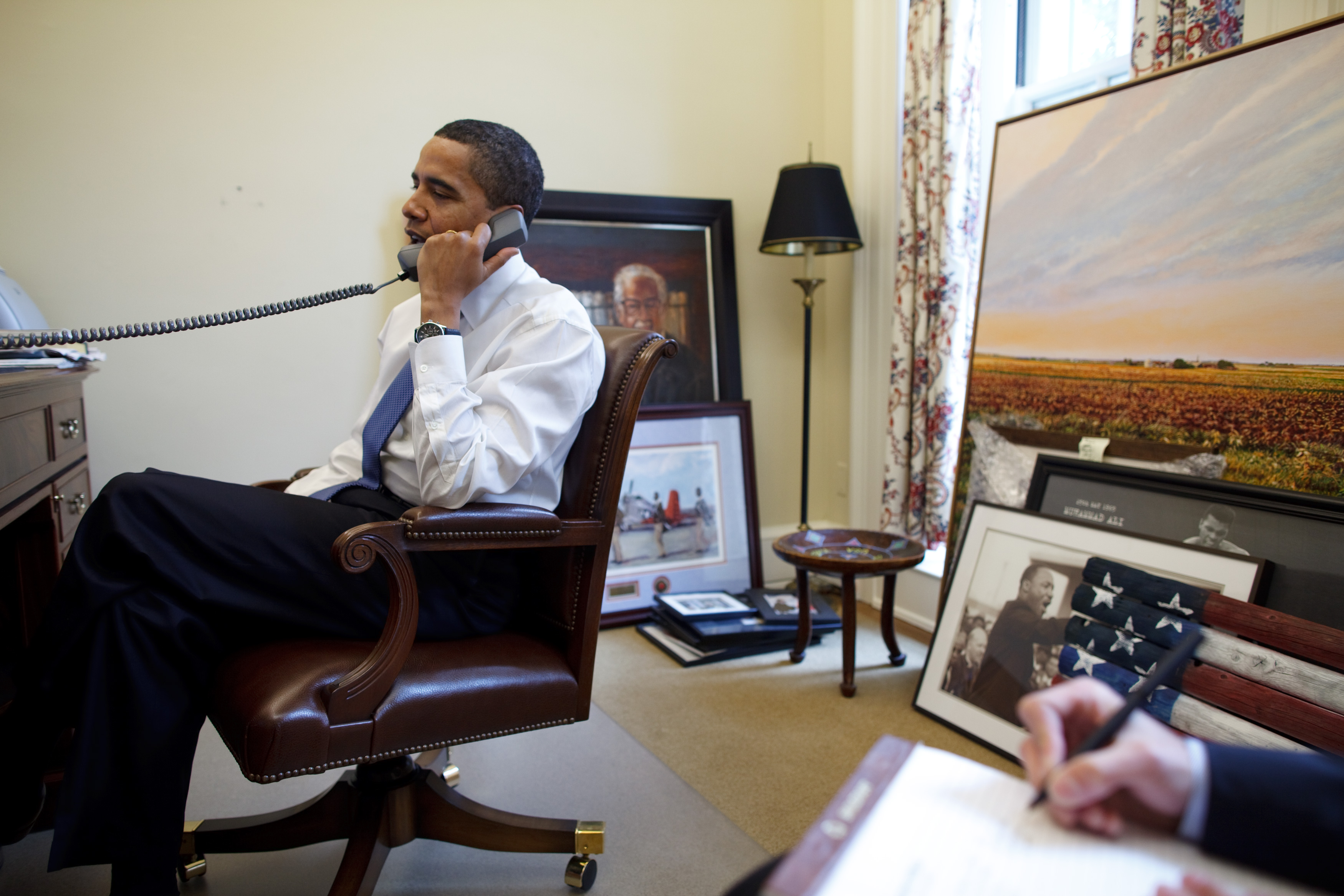
Barack Obama speaks into a telephone in the Oval Office Study

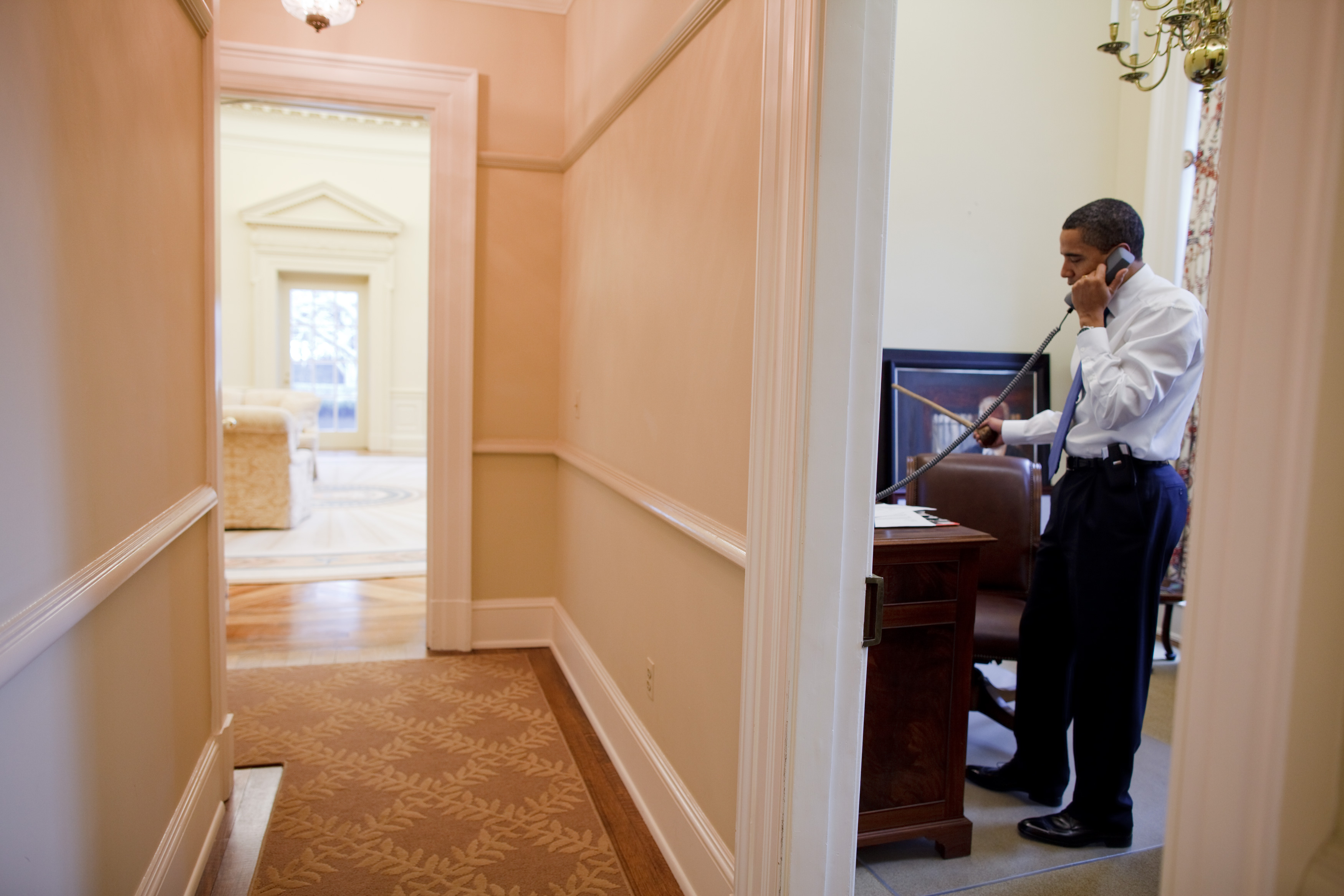
Barack Obama in the Oval Office Study; the interior of the Oval Office can be seen through the open door

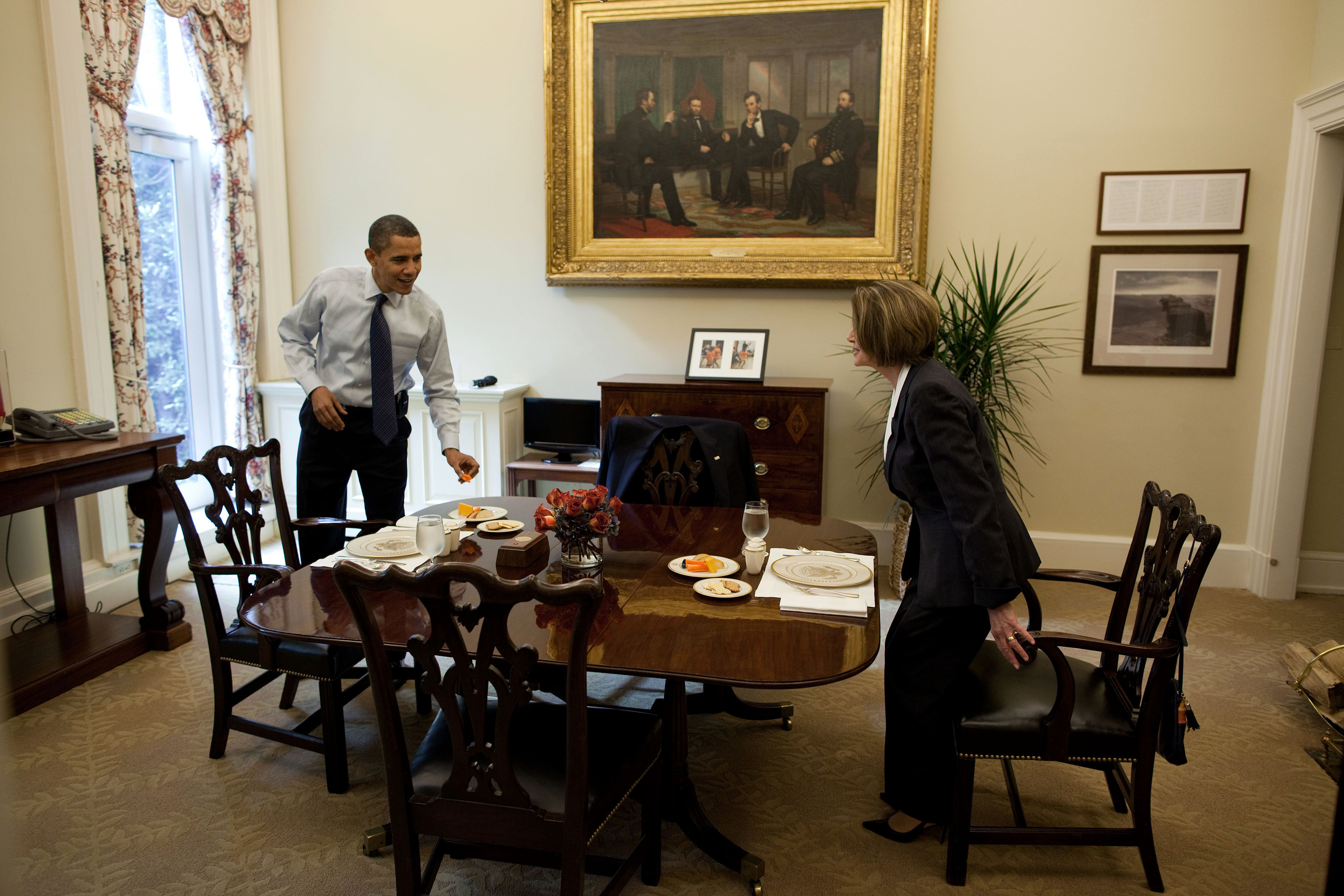
Barack Obama and Speaker Nancy Pelosi in the private dining room adjacent to the Oval Office Study, with The Peacemakers painting above.
