= Oval Office =

US presidential office in the White House

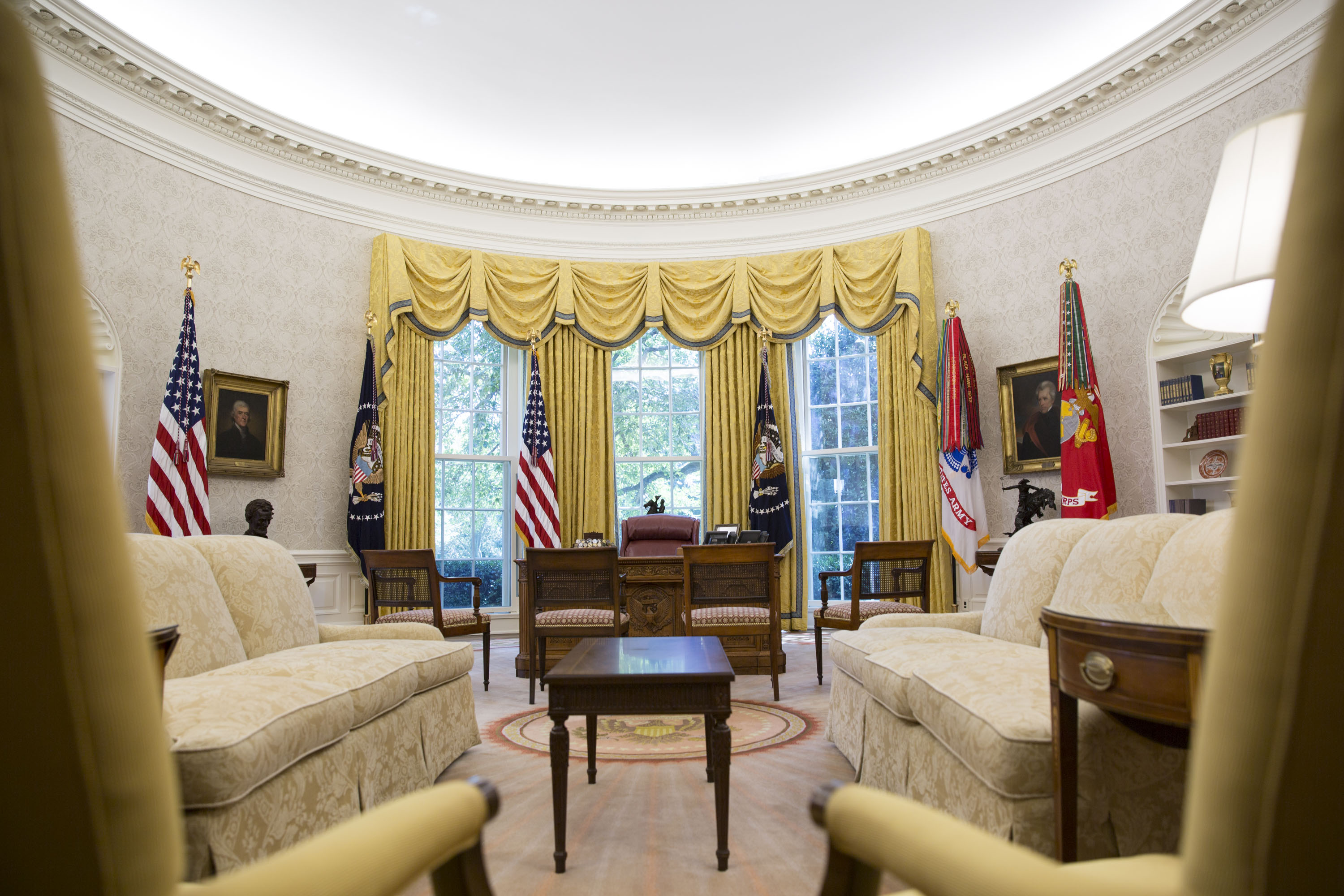
- Oval Office in 2017, under president Donald Trump
- Building: White House
- Location: Washington D.C.
- Country: United States
- Owner: United States federal government

Oval Office National Monument
- Interactive map of Oval Office National Monument
- Location: Oval Office, Rooms 106 and 110, Cabinet Room
- Coordinates: 38.8974°N 77.0374°W

U.S. National Monument
- Designated: November 5, 2026

U.S. National Historic Landmark
- Designated: December 19, 1960
- Part of: The White House

D.C. Inventory of Historic Sites
- Designated: November 8, 1964
- Part of: The White House
- Reference no.: 63

The Oval Office is the formal working space of the president of the United States at the White House in Washington, D.C. Part of the Executive Office of the President, it is located at the southeast corner of the West Wing.

The first Oval Office in the West Wing was constructed under President William Howard Taft in 1909, at the center of the south side of the West Wing. It mimicked the shape of the Yellow Oval Room in the main residence, which was historically used for the President to receive guests. It was damaged in a 1929 fire but restored. The current Oval Office was the idea of President Franklin D. Roosevelt, and was designed by architect Eric Gugler as part of a 1933–34 expansion of the West Wing. The new office offered FDR, who used a wheelchair, easier access, more privacy, and much more natural light. The Taft Oval Office was demolished in Gugler's expansion of the West Wing, and the space became additional staff offices.

The Oval Office has three large windows facing the South Lawn, in front of which the president's desk traditionally is placed. A fireplace at the north end is generally flanked by two armchairs. Two built-in bookcases are recessed into the west wall, and are balanced by two windows in the east wall. There are four doors: the east door opens to the Rose Garden; the west door leads to a private study, bathroom, and dining room; the northwest door opens onto the main corridor of the West Wing; and the northeast door opens to the office of the president's secretary.

The Oval Office takes its inspiration from the oval rooms at the center of the White House's south facade. Presidents generally decorate the office to suit their own personal tastes, choosing furniture and drapery and often commissioning oval carpets. Artwork is selected from the White House collection, or borrowed from museums for the president's term.

The Oval Office, along with the Outer Oval Office and Cabinet Room, has been part of the Oval Office National Monument since 2026.

== Cultural history ==
The Oval Office has become associated in Americans' minds with the presidency itself through memorable images, such as a young John F. Kennedy Jr. peering through the front panel of his father John F. Kennedy's desk, President Richard Nixon speaking by telephone with the Apollo 11 astronauts during their moonwalk, and Amy Carter bringing her Siamese cat Misty Malarky Ying Yang to brighten her father President Jimmy Carter's day. Several presidents have addressed the nation from the Oval Office on occasion. Examples include Kennedy presenting news of the Cuban Missile Crisis (1962), Lyndon B. Johnson announcing that he will not run for reelection (1968), Nixon announcing his resignation from office (1974), Ronald Reagan following the Space Shuttle Challenger disaster (1986), and George W. Bush in the wake of the September 11 attacks (2001).

== History, 1789–1909 ==
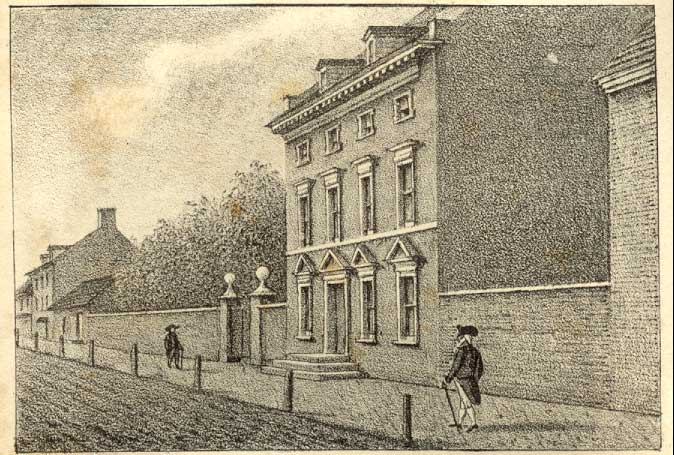
President's House, Philadelphia. George Washington's bow window (not depicted) is echoed in the shape of the Oval Office.

=== Washington's bow window ===
The White House was not ready for occupancy until 1800, late in the presidential term of John Adams. George Washington spent most of his presidency in Philadelphia, which served as the temporary national capital from 1790 to 1800, while the new city of Washington, D.C. was under construction.

In 1790, Washington built a large, two-story, semi-circular addition to the rear of the President's House in Philadelphia, creating a ceremonial space in which the public would meet the president. Standing before the three sections of this bow window, he formally received guests for his Tuesday afternoon audiences, delegations from Congress and foreign dignitaries, and the general public at open houses on New Year's Day, the Fourth of July, and his birthday.

Washington received his guests, standing between the windows in his back drawing-room. The company, entering a front room and passing through an unfolding door, made their salutations to the President, and turning off, stood on one side.

Adams occupied the Philadelphia mansion from March 1797, and used the bow window in the same manner as had his predecessor.

Curved foundations of Washington's bow window were uncovered during archaeological excavation of the site of the President's House in 2007. They are exhibited under glass at the President's House Commemoration, next to the Liberty Bell Center.

=== White House ===
Architect James Hoban visited President Washington in Philadelphia in June 1792, and probably saw the bow window. The next month, Hoban won the design competition for the White House.

The elliptic salon at the center of the White House was the outstanding feature of Hoban's original plan. Oval rooms became common in neoclassical architecture early in the 19th century.

In November 1800, John Adams became the first president to occupy the White House. He and his successor, President Thomas Jefferson, used Hoban's oval rooms as Washington had used his bow window salon, standing before the three windows at the south end to receive guests.

In the 19th century, some presidents used the White House's second-floor Yellow Oval Room as their private offices and libraries. This cultural association, between the president and an oval room, was more fully expressed in the Taft Oval Office (1909) in the West Wing.

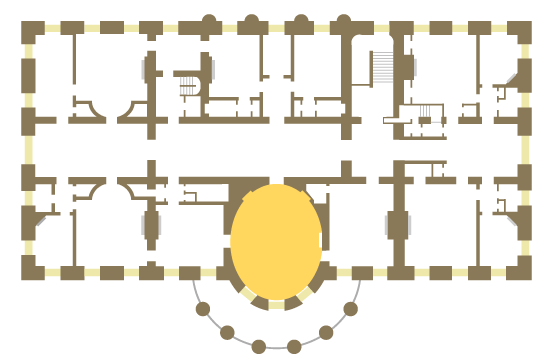
Location of the Yellow Oval Room on the second floor of the White House. A number of presidents used this as their private office or library.

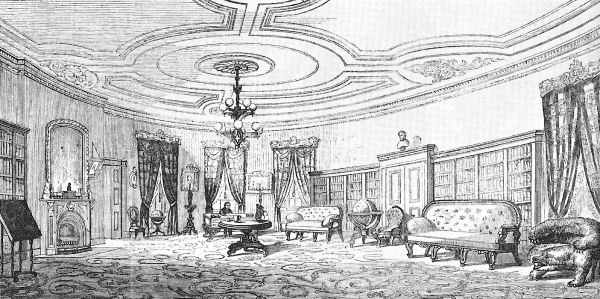
The Yellow Oval Room about 1868 used as President Andrew Johnson's private office

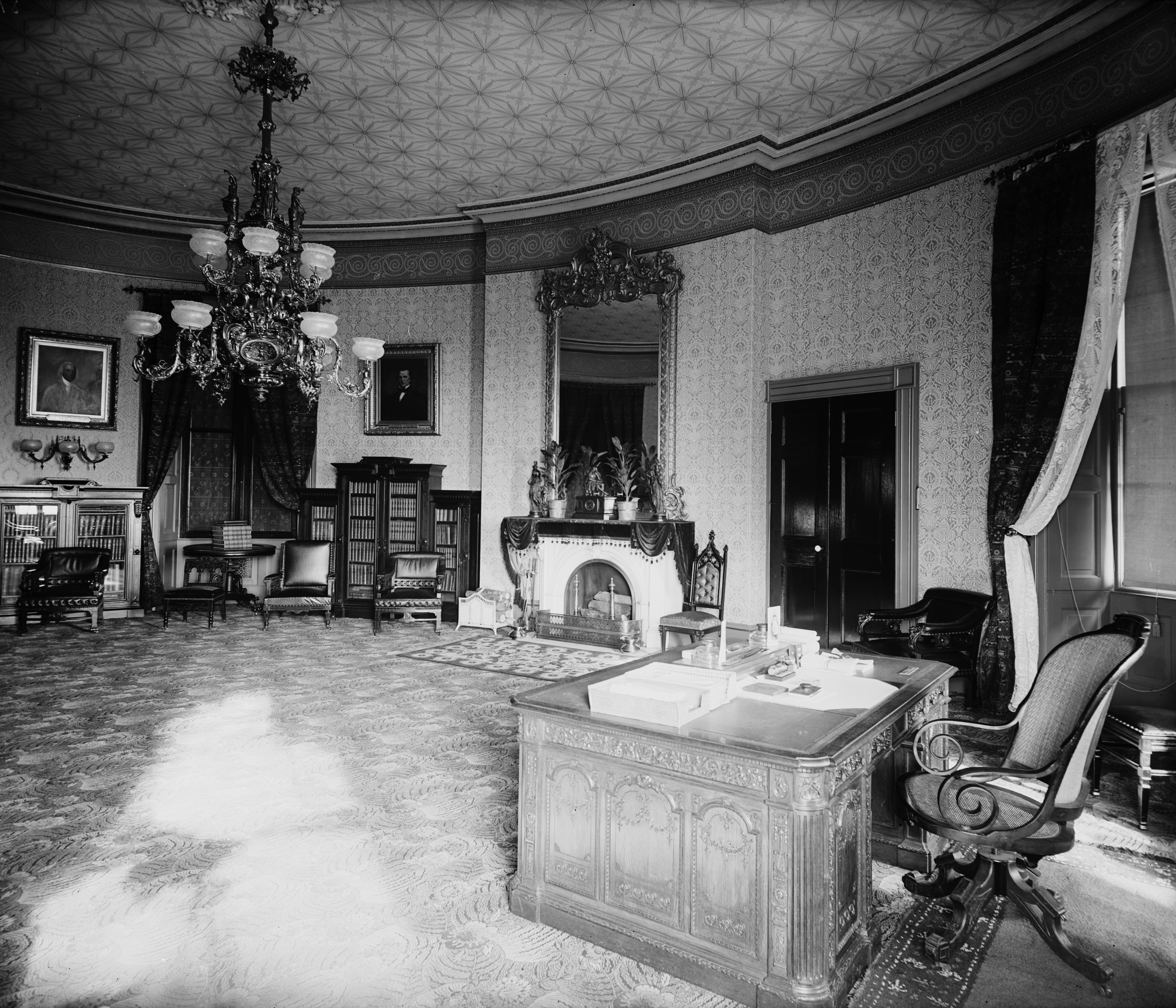
The Yellow Oval Room as President Grover Cleveland's private office, 1886. The Resolute desk stands before the windows.

The Yellow Oval Room as President Franklin D. Roosevelt's private office, 1933

=== West Wing ===
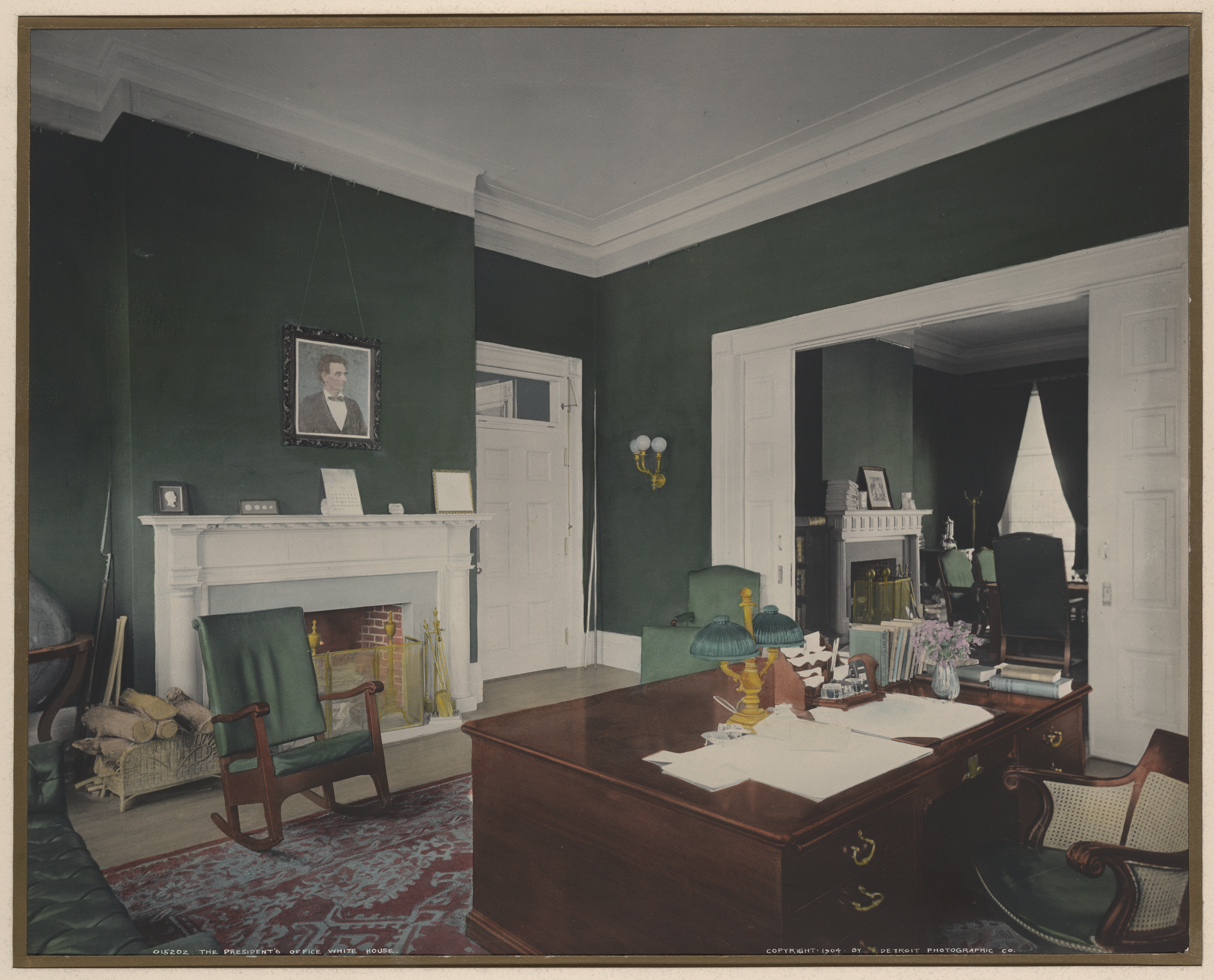
Theodore Roosevelt Executive Office and Cabinet Room, c. 1904

The West Wing was the idea of President Theodore Roosevelt, brought about by his wife's opinion that the second floor of the White House, then shared between bedrooms and offices, should be solely a domestic space. Completed in 1902, the one-story Executive Office Building was intended to be a temporary structure, for use until a permanent building was erected there or elsewhere. Siting the building west of the White House allowed the removal of a vast, dilapidated set of pre–Civil War greenhouses, which had been erected by President James Buchanan.

Roosevelt moved the offices of the executive branch into the newly constructed wing in 1902. His workspace was a two-room suite of Executive Office and Cabinet Room, occupying the eastern third of the building. Its furniture, including the president's desk, was designed by architect Charles Follen McKim, and executed by A. H. Davenport and Company, both of Boston. Now much altered, the 1902 Executive Office survives as the Roosevelt Room, a windowless interior meeting room situated diagonally from the Oval Office.

== Taft Oval Office: 1909–1933 ==
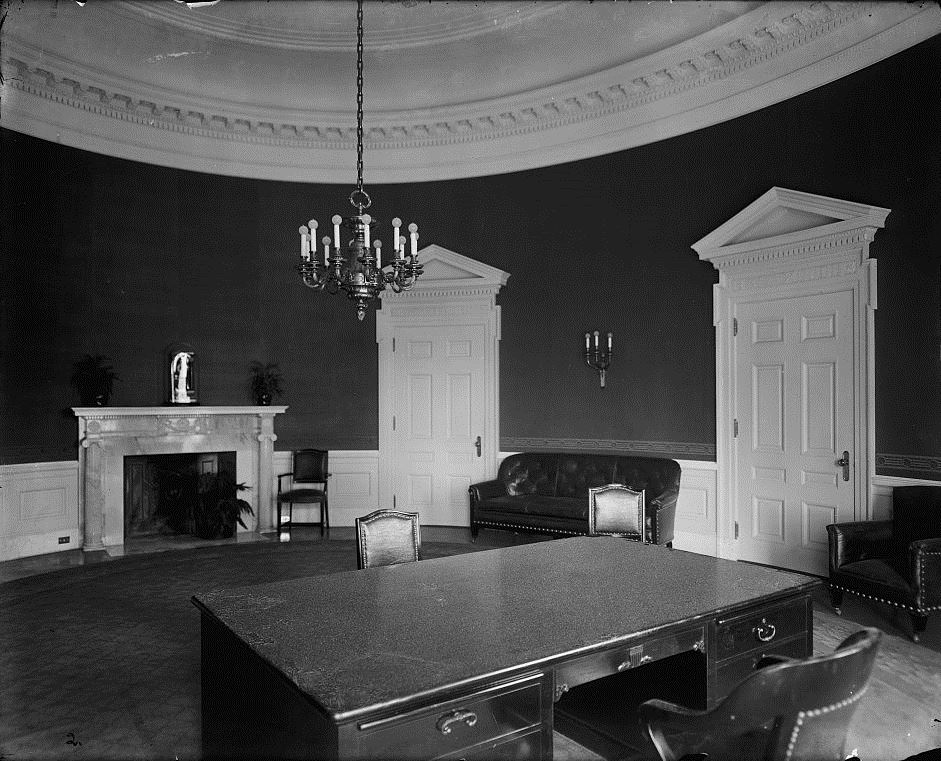
Taft Oval Office, completed 1909. Nearly identical in size to the modern office, it was damaged by fire in 1929 and demolished in 1933.

President William Howard Taft made the West Wing a permanent building, doubling its size by expanding it southward, and building the first Oval Office. Designed by Nathan C. Wyeth and completed in 1909, the office was centered on the building's south facade, much as the oval rooms in the White House are. Taft wanted to be more involved with the day-to-day operation of his presidency, and intended the office to be the hub of his administration. The Taft Oval Office had ample natural light from its three windows and skylight. It featured a white marble mantel, simple Georgian Revival woodwork, and twin glass-doored bookcases. It also was likely the most colorful presidential office in history; its walls were covered with vibrant seagrass green burlap.

On December 24, 1929, during the first year of President Herbert Hoover's administration, a fire severely damaged the West Wing. Hoover used this as an opportunity to create additional space, excavating a partial basement for staff offices. He restored the Oval Office, upgrading the quality of trim and installing air conditioning. He also replaced the furniture, which had undergone no major changes in twenty years.

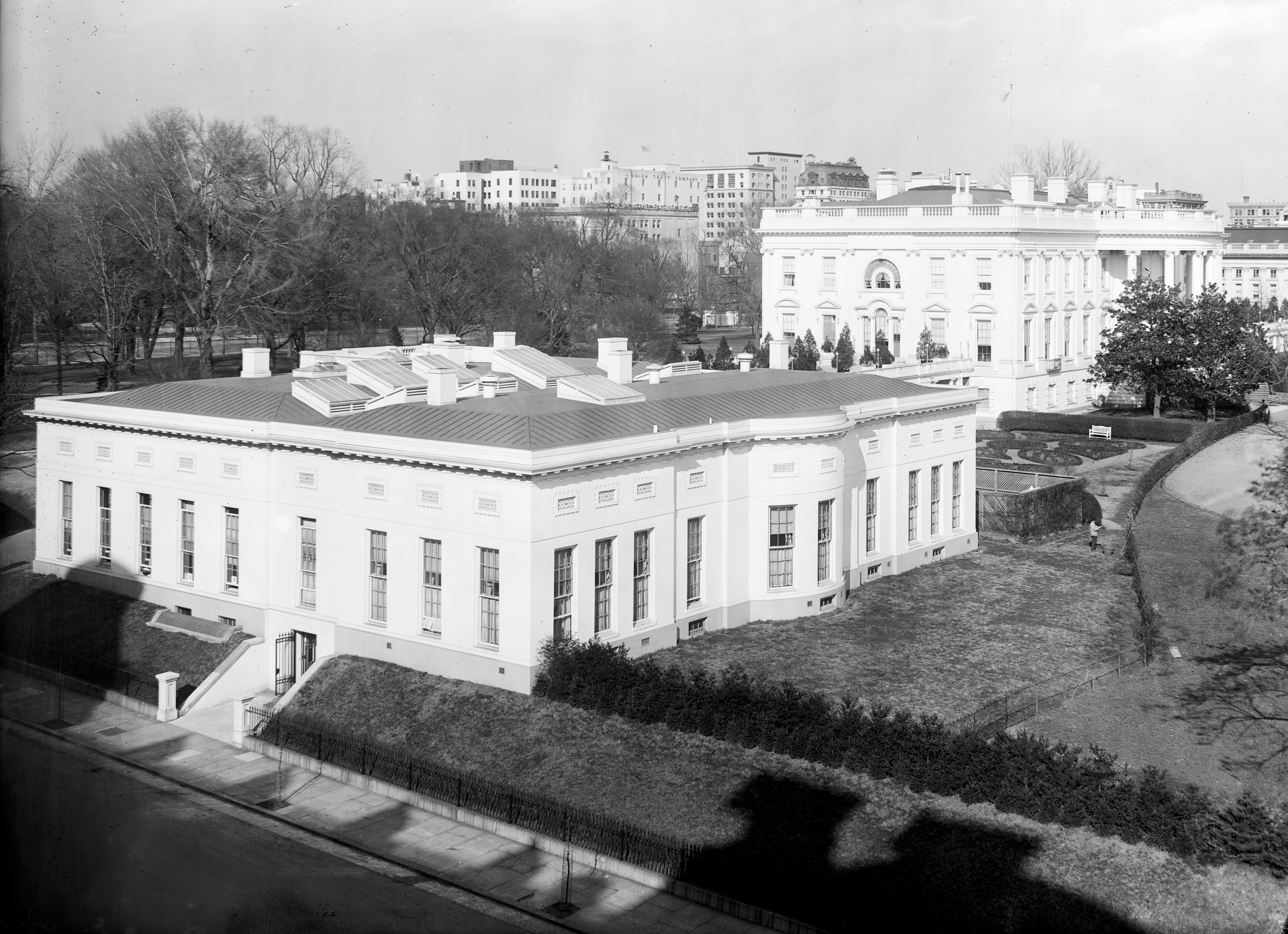
Exterior of the West Wing (c. 1910s), showing the curve of the Taft Oval Office

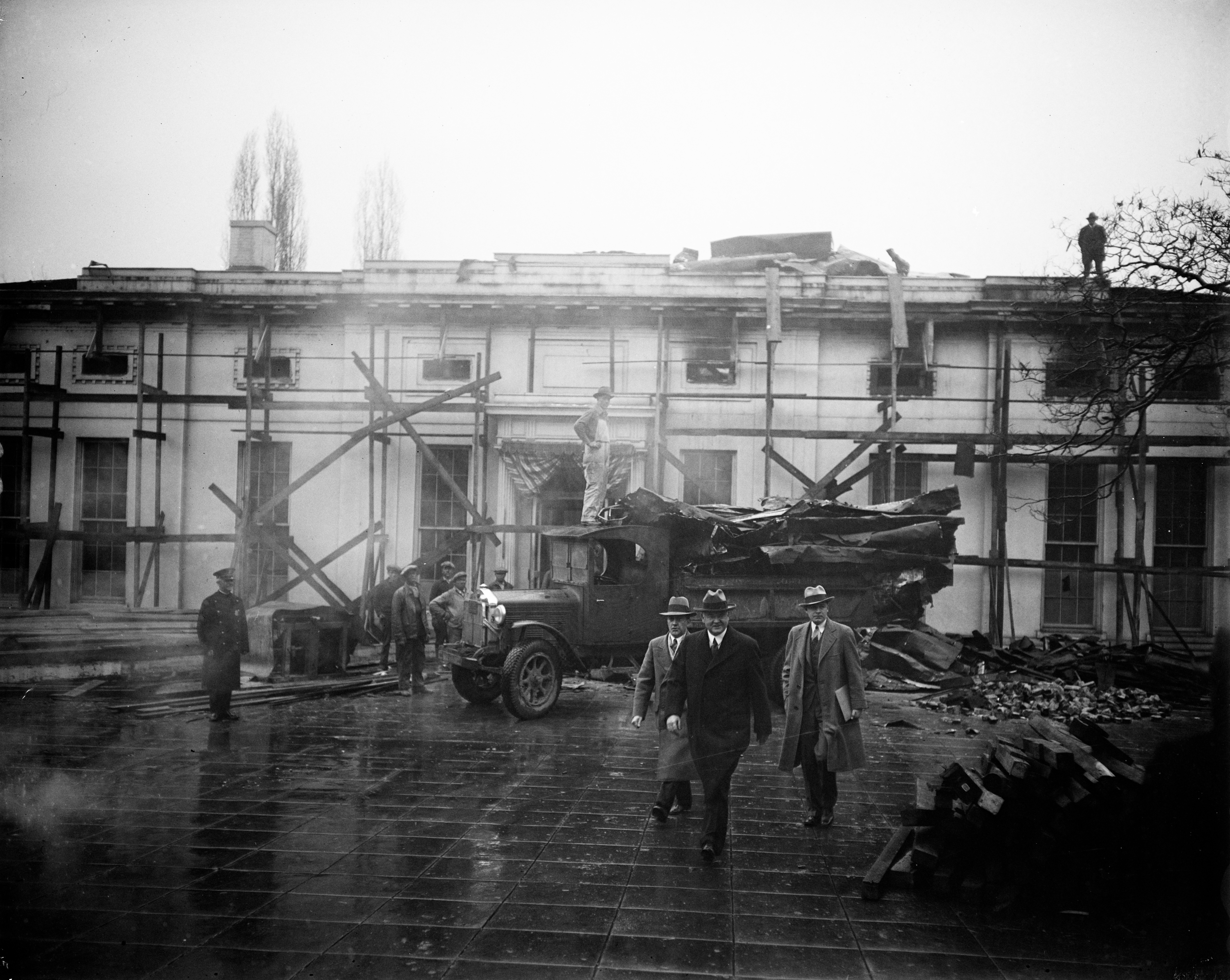
President Hoover views West Wing fire ruins, January 15, 1930

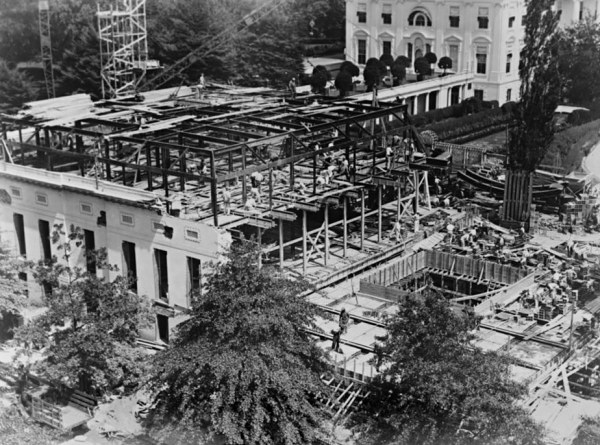
West Wing expansion, 1934

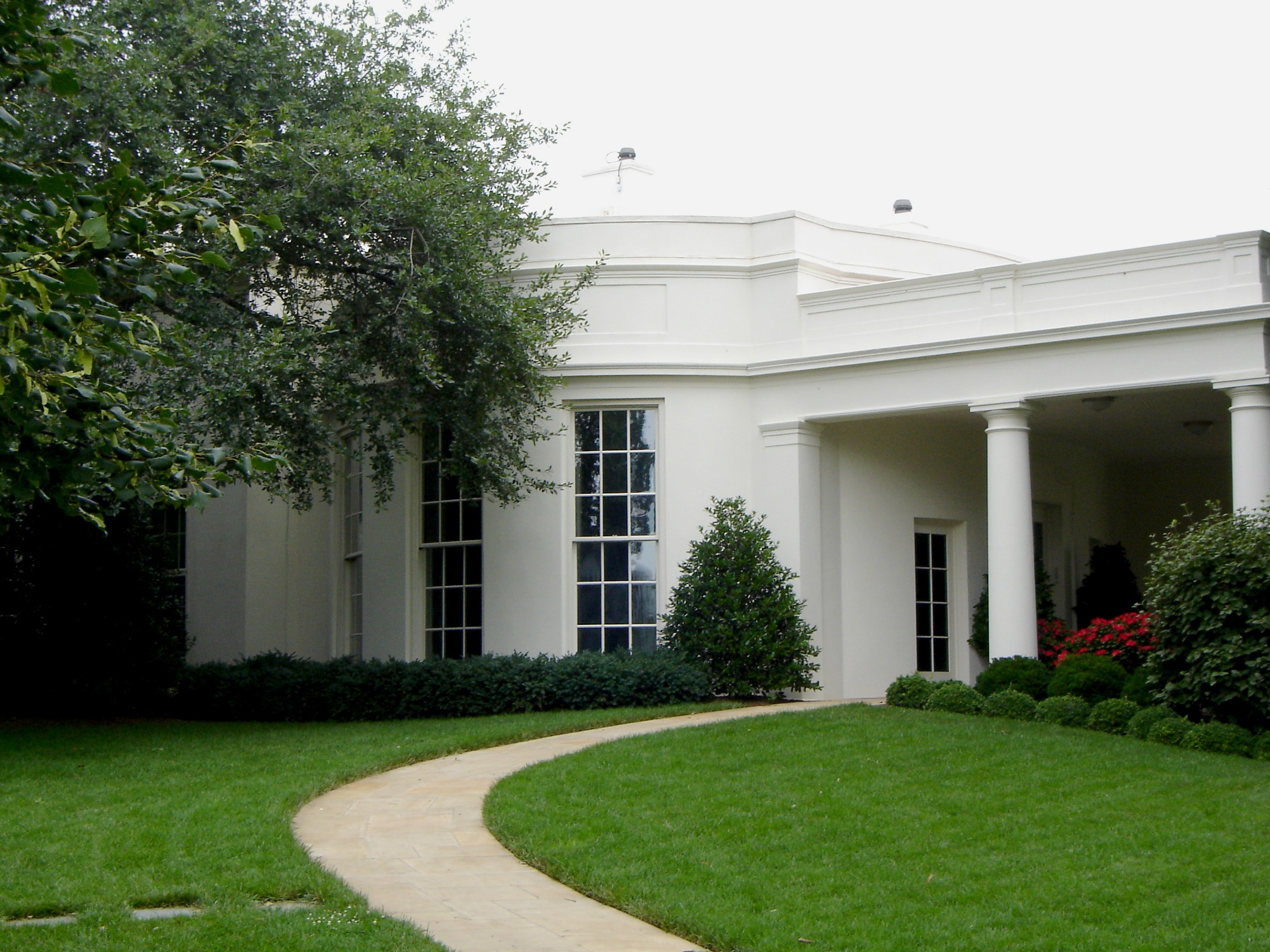
Exterior of the Oval Office from the South Lawn, July 15, 2006

== Modern Oval Office: 1934–present ==
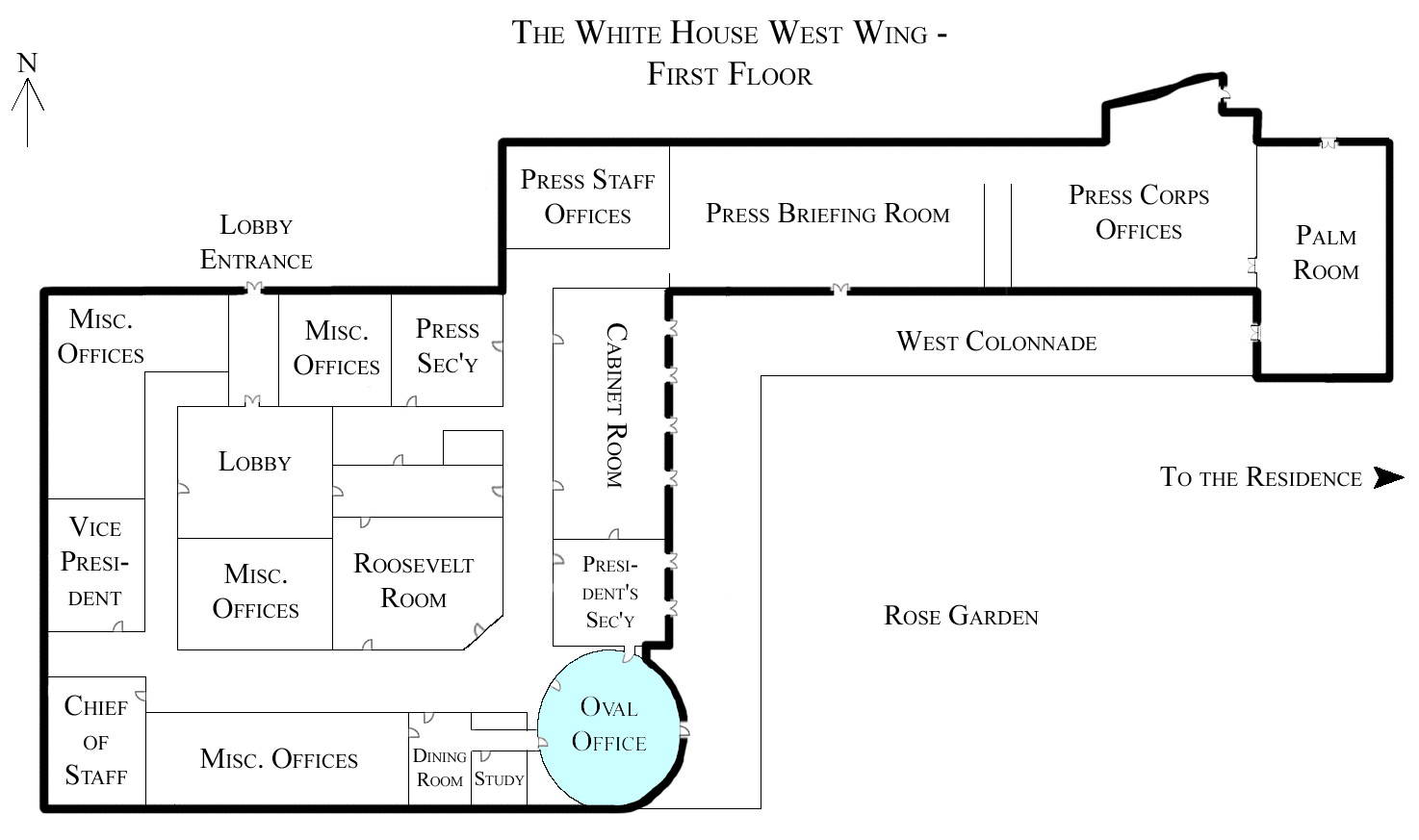
Location of the Oval Office in the West Wing

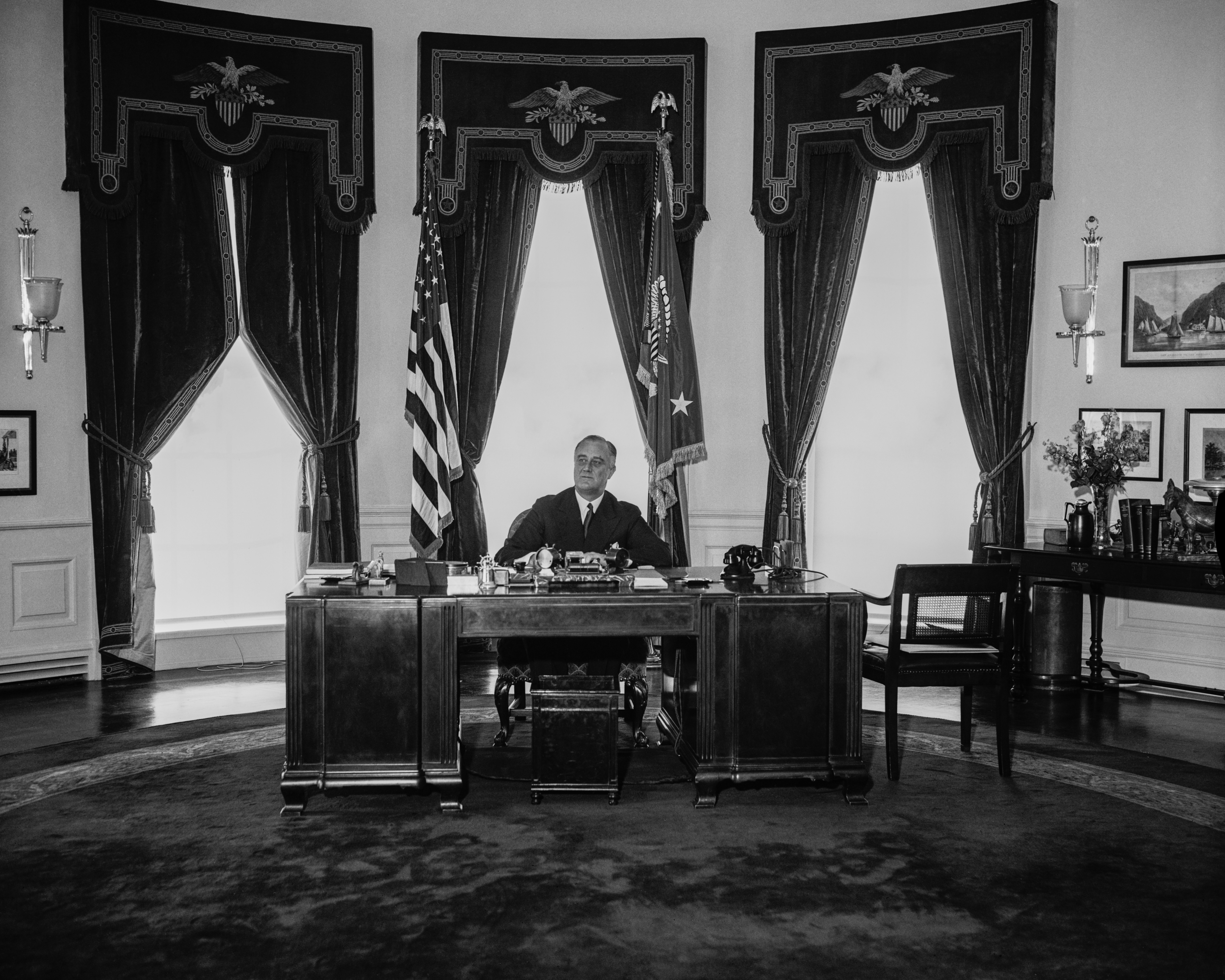
Franklin D. Roosevelt in the newly completed Modern Oval Office, December 31, 1934

Dissatisfied with the size and layout of the West Wing, President Franklin D. Roosevelt engaged New York architect Eric Gugler to redesign it in 1933. To create additional staff space without increasing the apparent size of the building, Gugler excavated a full basement, added a set of subterranean offices under the adjacent lawn, and built an unobtrusive penthouse storey. The directive to wring the most office space out of the existing building was responsible for its narrow corridors and cramped staff offices. Gugler's most visible addition was the expansion of the building eastward for a new Cabinet Room and Oval Office.

The modern Oval Office was built at the West Wing's southeast corner, offering Roosevelt, who was physically disabled and used a wheelchair, more privacy and easier access to the Residence. He and Gugler devised a room architecturally grander than the previous two offices, with more robust Georgian details: doors topped with substantial pediments, bookcases set into niches, a deep bracketed cornice, and a ceiling medallion of the Presidential Seal. Rather than a chandelier or ceiling fixture, the room is illuminated by light bulbs hidden within the cornice that wash the ceiling in light. In small ways, hints of Art Moderne can be seen, in the sconces flanking the windows and the representation of the eagle in the ceiling medallion. Roosevelt and Gugler worked closely together, often over breakfast, with Gugler sketching the president's ideas. One notion resulting from these sketches that has become fixed in the layout of the room's furniture is that of two high back chairs in front of the fireplace. The public sees this most often with the president seated on the left and a visiting guest on the right. This allowed Roosevelt to be seated, with his guests at the same level, de-emphasizing his inability to stand without help. Construction of the modern Oval Office was completed in 1934.

=== Decoration ===
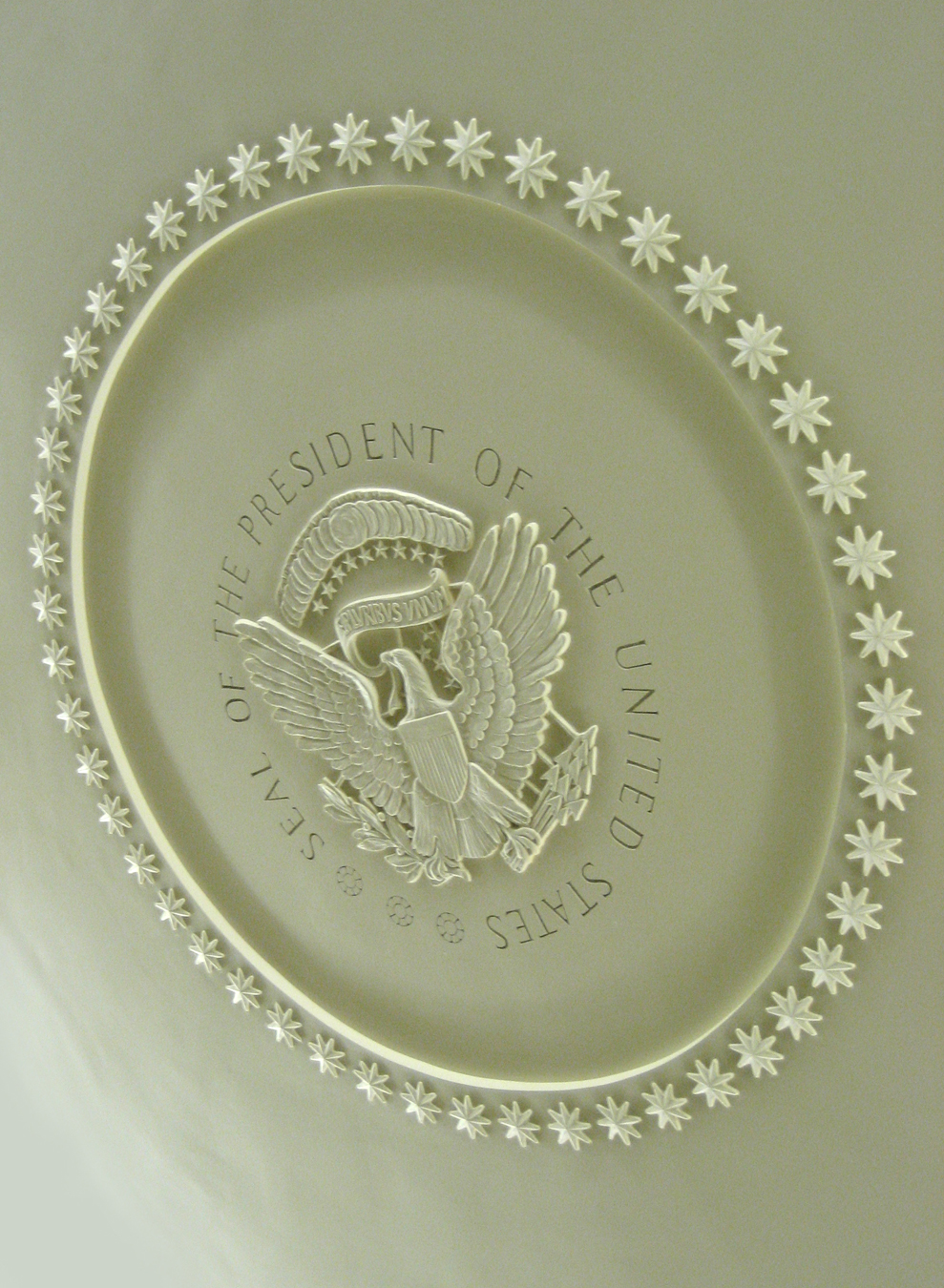
The plaster ceiling medallion installed in 1934 includes elements of the seal of the president of the United States.

The basic Oval Office furnishings have been a desk in front of the three windows at the south end, a pair of chairs in front of the fireplace at the north end, a pair of sofas, and assorted tables and chairs. The Neoclassical mantel was made for the Taft Oval Office in 1909 and salvaged after the 1929 West Wing fire. A tradition of displaying potted Swedish ivy (Plectranthus verticillatus) atop the mantel goes back to the mid-20th century, and the most recent plants were rooted from the original plant. The plant was removed from the Oval Office during the start of Donald Trump's second presidency in 2025 and replaced with a collection of gold objects.

A Federal longcase clock, made in Boston by John and Thomas Seymour c. 1795–1805 – commonly known as the Oval Office grandfather clock – was purchased by the White House Historical Association in 1972, and has stood next to the Oval Office's northeast door since 1975.

President Harry S. Truman replaced the Oval Office's 23-year-old dark green carpet in 1947. He had revised the seal of the president of the United States after World War II, and his blue-gray carpet incorporated the 1945 revised seal, represented monochromatically through varying depths of its cut pile. The Truman carpet remained in the office through the Dwight D. Eisenhower and John F. Kennedy administrations. Jacqueline Kennedy's redecoration of the Oval Office began on November 21, 1963, while she and President Kennedy were away on a trip to Texas. The following day, November 22, a red carpet was installed, just as the Kennedys were making their way through Dallas, where the president was assassinated. Lyndon B. Johnson had the red carpet removed and the Truman carpet reinstalled, and used the latter for his administration. Since Johnson, most administrations have created their own oval carpet, working with an interior designer and the curator of the White House.

==== Desks ====
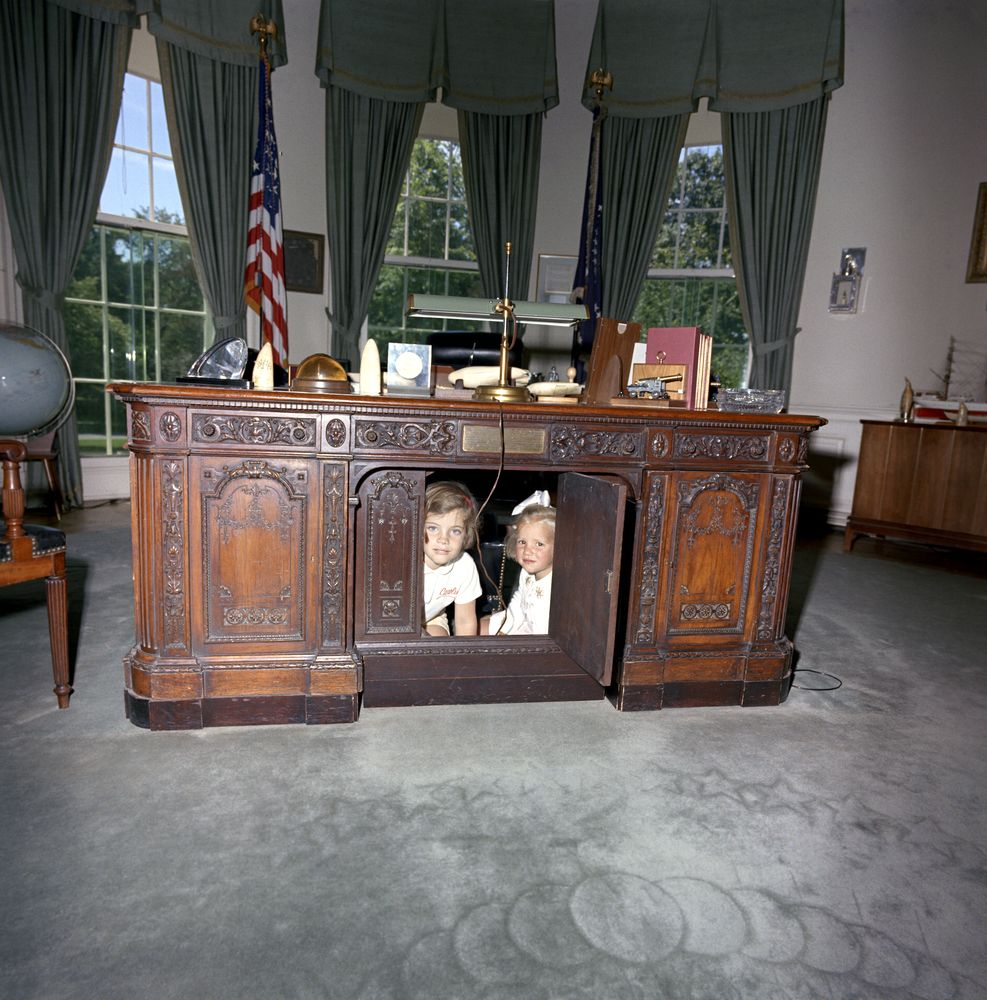
Caroline Kennedy and Kerry Kennedy beneath the Resolute desk in 1963. Note the Truman carpet.

Six desks have been used in the Oval Office by US presidents since its construction in 1909. The desk usually sits in front of the south wall of the Oval Office, which features three large windows. Some presidents only use the desk in this room for ceremonial purposes, such as photo opportunities and press announcements, while others use it as their main workspace.

The first desk used in the Oval Office was the Theodore Roosevelt desk, and the desk currently in use by Donald Trump is the Resolute desk. Of the six desks used in the Oval Office, the Resolute desk has spent the longest time there, having been used by eight presidents in the room. The Resolute has been used by all US presidents since 1977 with the exception of George H. W. Bush, who used the C&O desk for his one term, making it the shortest-serving desk to date. Other past presidents have used the Hoover desk, the Johnson desk, and the Wilson desk.

The Resolute desk, the current desk in use, is built from oak timbers that were once part of the ship HMS Resolute. The British Resolute was trapped in Arctic ice in 1854 and abandoned. The ship was discovered in 1855 by an American whaling ship and later underwent a complete refit, repaint, and restock paid for by the United States Government. It was returned to England in 1856 and decommissioned in 1879. The same year the British Admiralty launched a competition to design a piece of furniture made from the timbers of the Resolute which Queen Victoria could gift to the American president. Following a design competition, Queen Victoria ordered that three desks be made from the timbers of Resolute. The one that is now known as the Resolute desk was designed by Morant, Boyd, & Blanford, built by William Evenden at Chatham Dockyard, and announced as "recently manufactured" on November 18, 1880. The desk was delivered as a gift to President Rutherford B. Hayes in 1880. President Franklin D. Roosevelt requested that a panel be installed in the kneehole during his presidency. The desk was used in various areas of the White House until Jacqueline Kennedy had it moved to the Oval Office in 1961. Following the 1963 assassination of President Kennedy, the Resolute desk was transferred, on loan, to the Smithsonian Institution and went on tour around the country to help raise funds for the John F. Kennedy Presidential Library and Museum. After this tour, the desk was put on view at the Smithsonian Institution beginning in 1966. Jimmy Carter returned the Resolute desk to the Oval Office in 1977.

=== Artwork ===
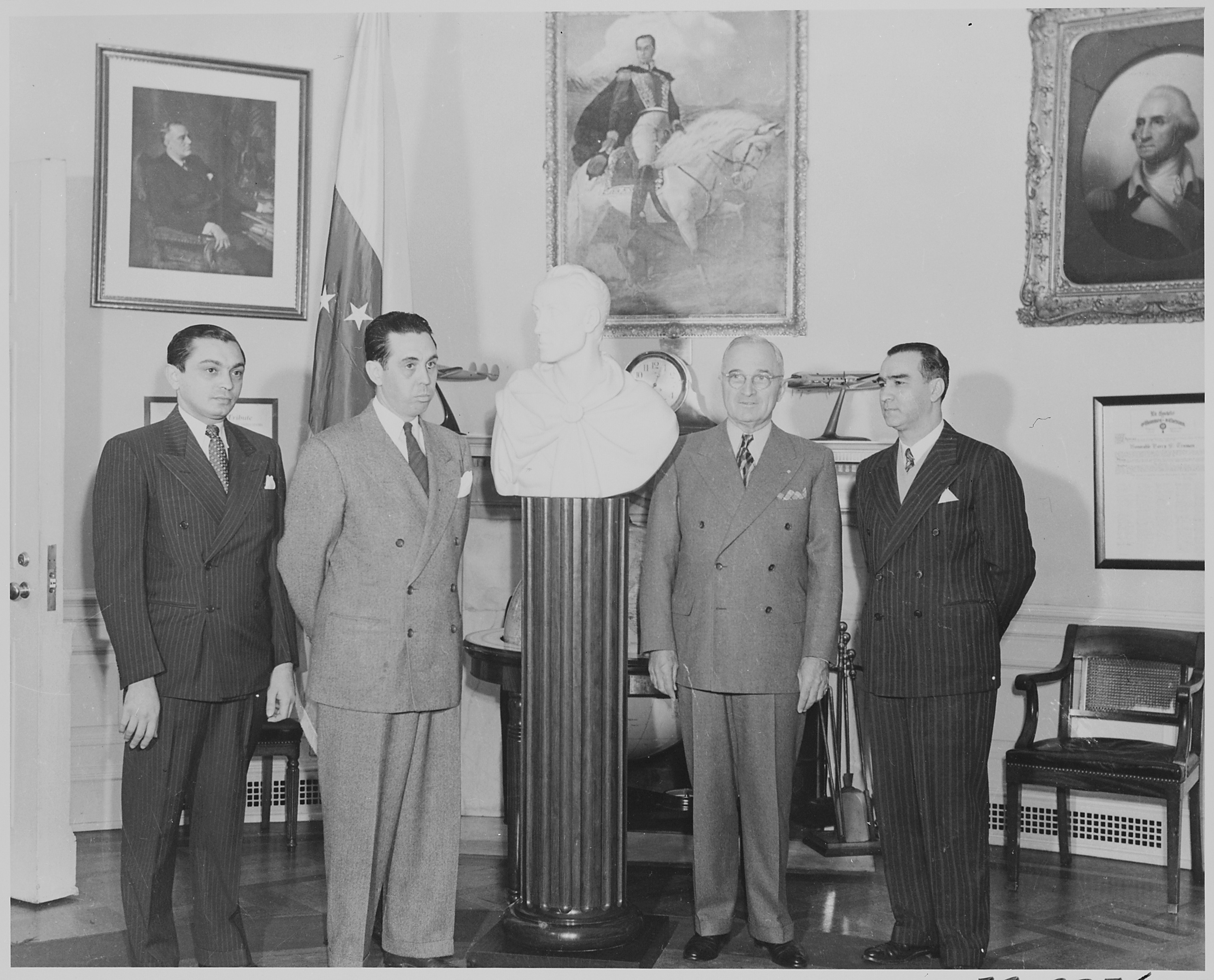
President Harry Truman receiving a marble bust of Simon Bolivar from a Venezuelan delegation, December 27, 1946

Artworks are selected from the White House collection or may be borrowed from museums or individuals for the length of an administration.

Most presidents have hung a portrait of George Washington – usually the Rembrandt Peale Porthole portrait or the Charles Willson Peale three-quarter-length portrait – over the mantel at the north end of the room. A portrait of Andrew Jackson by Thomas Sully hung in the offices of Lyndon B. Johnson, Ronald Reagan, George H. W. Bush and Bill Clinton. A portrait of Abraham Lincoln by George Henry Story hung in George W. Bush's office and continued in Barack Obama's and Joe Biden's. Three landscapes and cityscapes – City of Washington from Beyond the Navy Yard by George Cooke, Eastport and Passamaquoddy Bay by Victor de Grailly, and The President's House, a copy after William Henry Bartlett – have adorned the walls in multiple administrations.

Passing the Outpost (1881) by Alfred Wordsworth Thompson, a Revolutionary War genre scene of a carriage stopped at a British checkpoint, hung in Gerald Ford's office, and in Jimmy Carter's and Ronald Reagan's. The Avenue in the Rain by Childe Hassam and Working on the Statue of Liberty by Norman Rockwell flanked the Resolute desk in Bill Clinton's office and did the same in Barack Obama's. Avenue in the Rain hung beside the Resolute desk in Joe Biden's office.

Statuettes, busts, heads, and figurines are frequently displayed in the Oval Office. Abraham Lincoln has been the most common subject, in works by sculptors Augustus Saint-Gaudens, Gutzon Borglum, Adolph Alexander Weinman, Leo Cherne and others. Over time, traditional busts of George Washington, Thomas Jefferson, or Benjamin Franklin have given way to heads of Franklin D. Roosevelt, Harry S. Truman or Dwight Eisenhower. Western bronzes by Frederic Remington have been frequent choices: Lyndon Johnson displayed The Bronco Buster, as did Gerald Ford, Jimmy Carter, Ronald Reagan, Bill Clinton, George W. Bush, Barack Obama and Donald Trump. Presidents Reagan and George H.W. Bush added its companion piece, The Rattlesnake.

==== Paintings ====
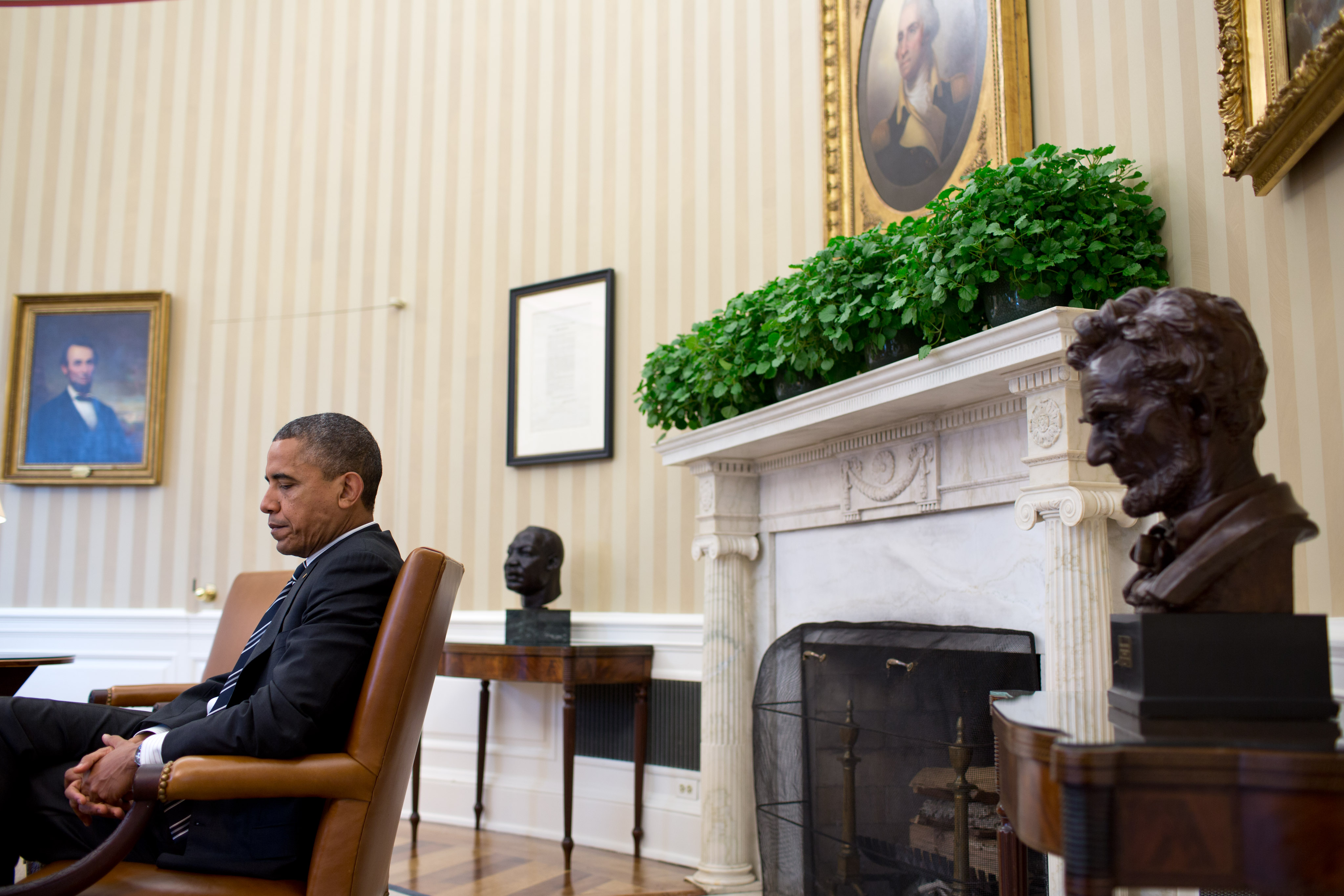
President Barack Obama with Oval Office artwork, September 28, 2012

President Dwight D. Eisenhower filled the office walls with landscape paintings, as well as a portrait of Robert E. Lee. According to The New York Times, as of 2021, an estimated 43 paintings and one photograph have decorated the walls of the Oval Office since 1961. Franklin D. Roosevelt was the first president to occupy the Modern Oval Office, and placed Rembrandt Peale's George Washington over the mantel. Assorted prints of the Hudson Valley hung on the walls.

President Harry S. Truman displayed works related to his home state of Missouri, prints of biplanes and sailing ships, and models of jet airplanes. A series of paintings held pride of place over the mantel, including Rembrandt Peale's George Washington, Charles H. Woodbury's Woodrow Wilson, Luis Cadena's George Washington (the gift of Ecuador), and a copy of Tito Salas's Equestrian Portrait of Simon Bolivar (the gift of Venezuela). A large photograph of the White House portrait of Franklin D. Roosevelt, under whom Truman had served as vice president and who died in office in 1945, hung beside the mantel and later beside his desk. He also displayed the painting Fired On by Western artist Frederic Remington.

President John F. Kennedy surrounded himself with paintings of naval battles from the War of 1812, photographs of sailboats, and ship models. President Lyndon B. Johnson installed sconces on either side of the mantel, and added the office's first painting by a woman artist, Franklin D. Roosevelt by Elizabeth Shoumatoff. President Richard Nixon tried three different portraits of George Washington over the mantel, and hung a copy of Earthrise – a photograph of the Earth taken from the Moon's orbit during the Apollo 8 mission – beside his desk.

President Gerald Ford hung historic paintings, possibly in anticipation of the 1976 Bicentennial. Most of these works remained in place through the administrations of Jimmy Carter and Ronald Reagan. President George H. W. Bush hung landscape paintings on the walls, along with three portraits: Rembrandt Peale's George Washington, Charles Willson Peale's Benjamin Henry Latrobe, and Thomas Sully's Andrew Jackson. President Bill Clinton chose the Childe Hassam and Norman Rockwell paintings mentioned above, along with Waiting for the Hour by William T. Carlton, a genre scene depicting African-Americans gathered in anticipation of the Emancipation Proclamation going into effect on January 1, 1863. President George W. Bush mixed traditional works with paintings by Texas artists and Western sculptures. Following the September 11, 2001 attacks, British Prime Minister Tony Blair lent him a bust of Winston Churchill, who had guided the United Kingdom through World War II.

President Barack Obama honored Abraham Lincoln with the portrait by Story, a bust by Augustus Saint-Gaudens, and a copy of the Emancipation Proclamation. Below the proclamation was a bust of Martin Luther King Jr. by Charles Alston, and in the nearby bookcase was displayed a program from the August 28, 1963, March on Washington, at which King gave his "I Have a Dream" speech.

President Donald Trump hung mostly portraits on the office walls: Rembrandt Peale's George Washington, George H. Story's Abraham Lincoln, Asher B. Durand's Andrew Jackson, George P. A. Healy's Thomas Jefferson, John Trumbull's Alexander Hamilton, Joseph-Siffred Duplessis's Benjamin Franklin. He later substituted in other portraits: Rembrandt Peale's Thomas Jefferson and Ralph E. W. Earl's Andrew Jackson. President Joe Biden's Oval Office featured a cluster of five portraits at its north end, with Frank O. Salisbury's Franklin D. Roosevelt given pride of place over the mantel. On the left of the Roosevelt, there were portraits of George Washington and Abraham Lincoln, and on the right were Thomas Jefferson and Alexander Hamilton.

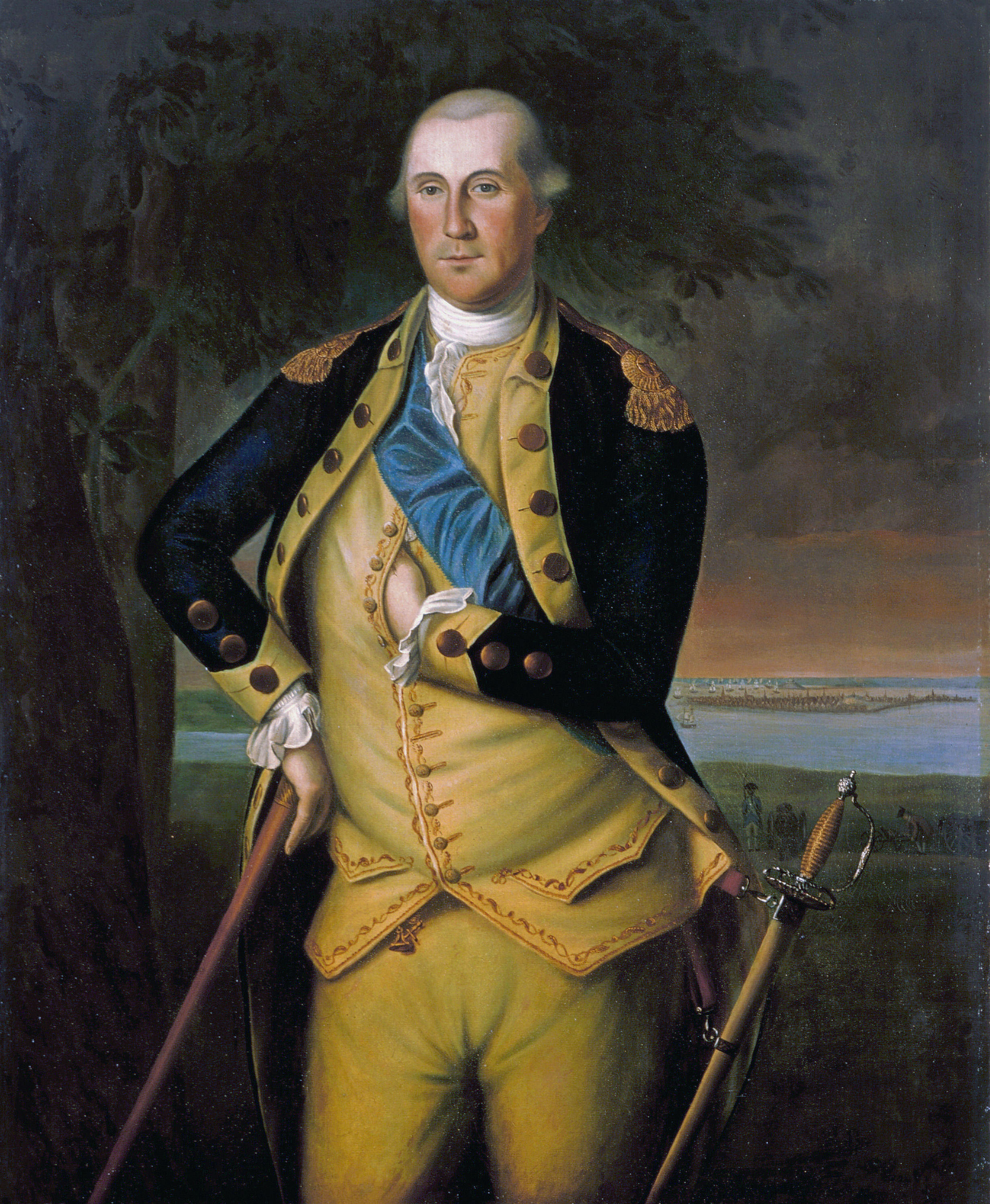
George Washington (1776) by Charles Willson Peale

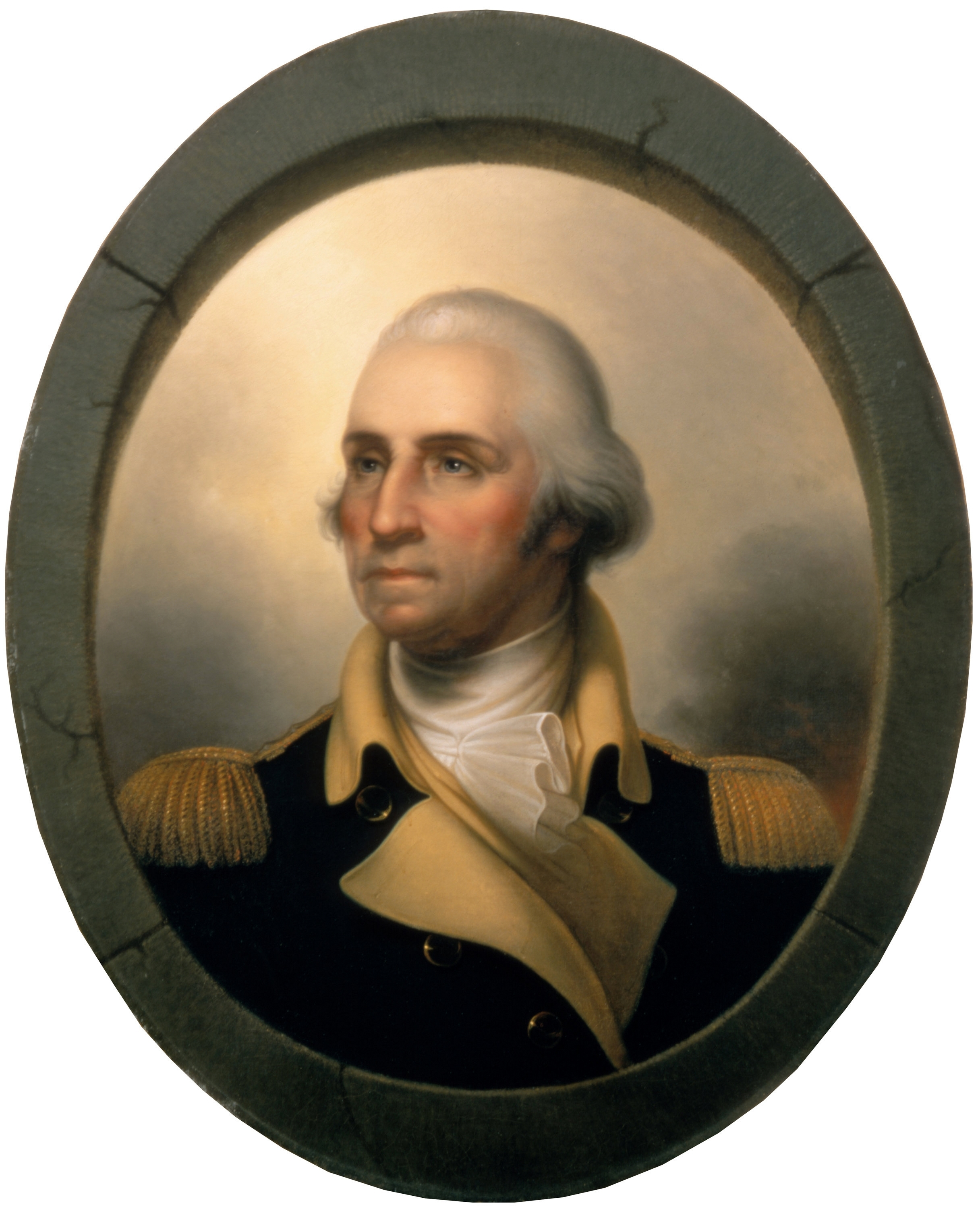
George Washington (c.1823) by Rembrandt Peale

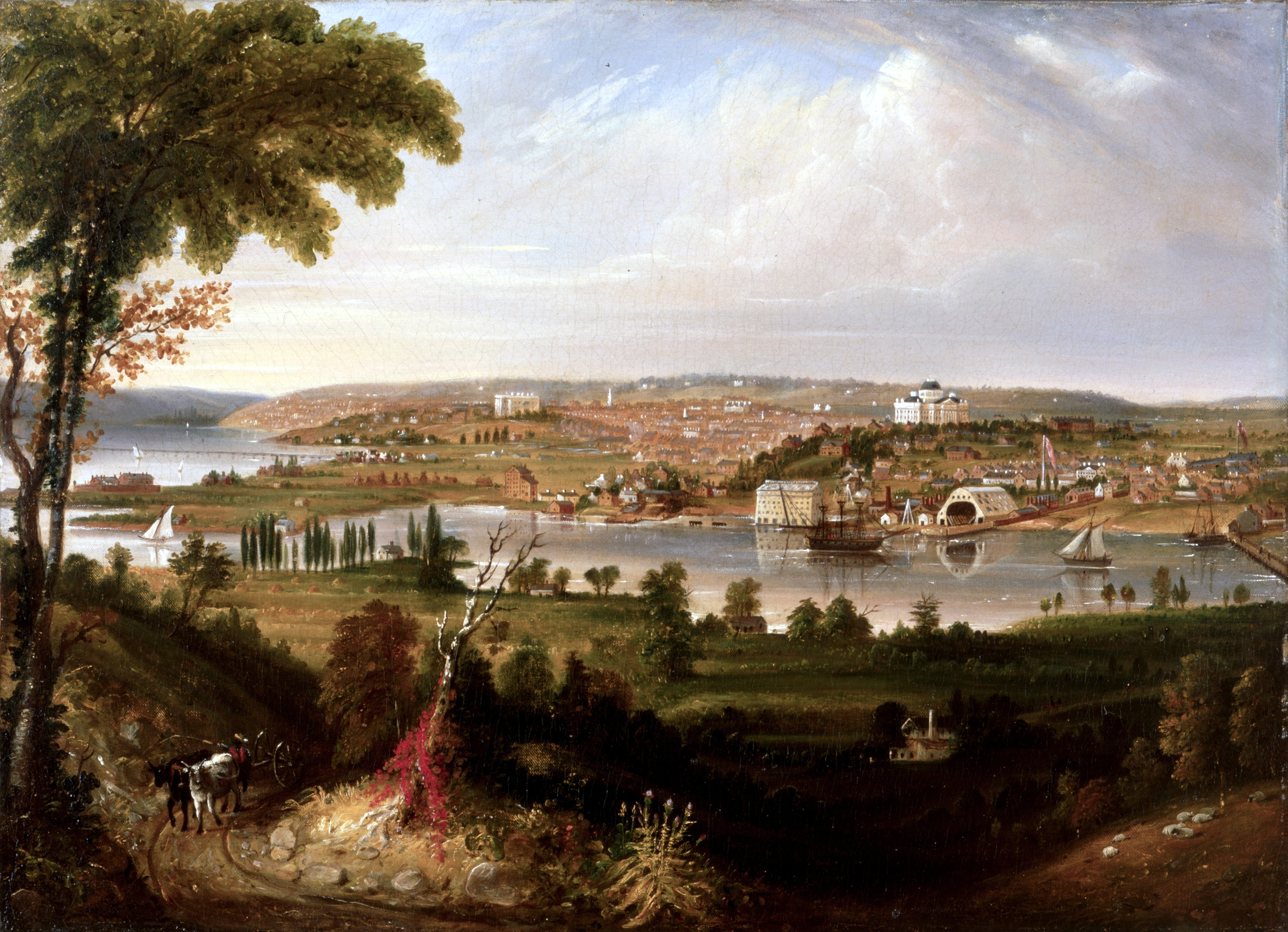
City of Washington from Beyond the Navy Yard (1833) by George Cooke

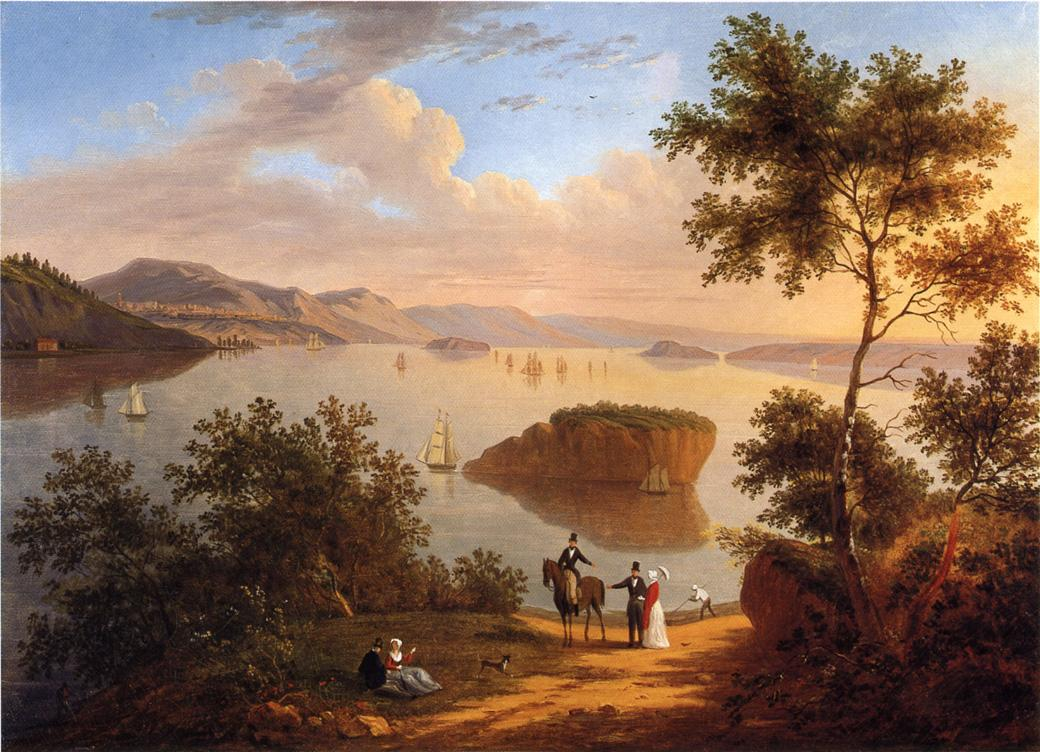
Eastport and Passamaquoddy Bay (c.1840) by Victor De Grailly

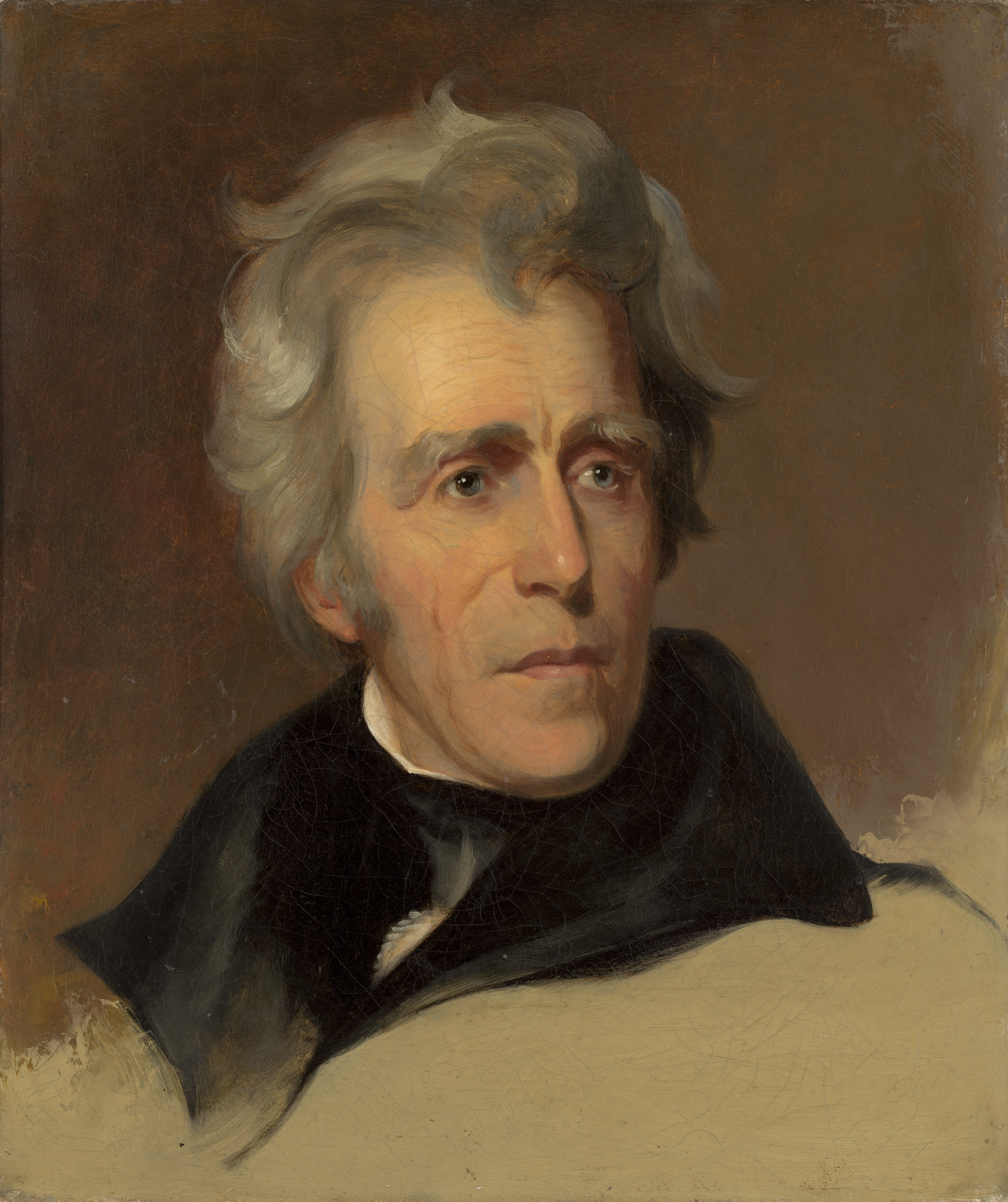
Andrew Jackson (1845) by Thomas Sully

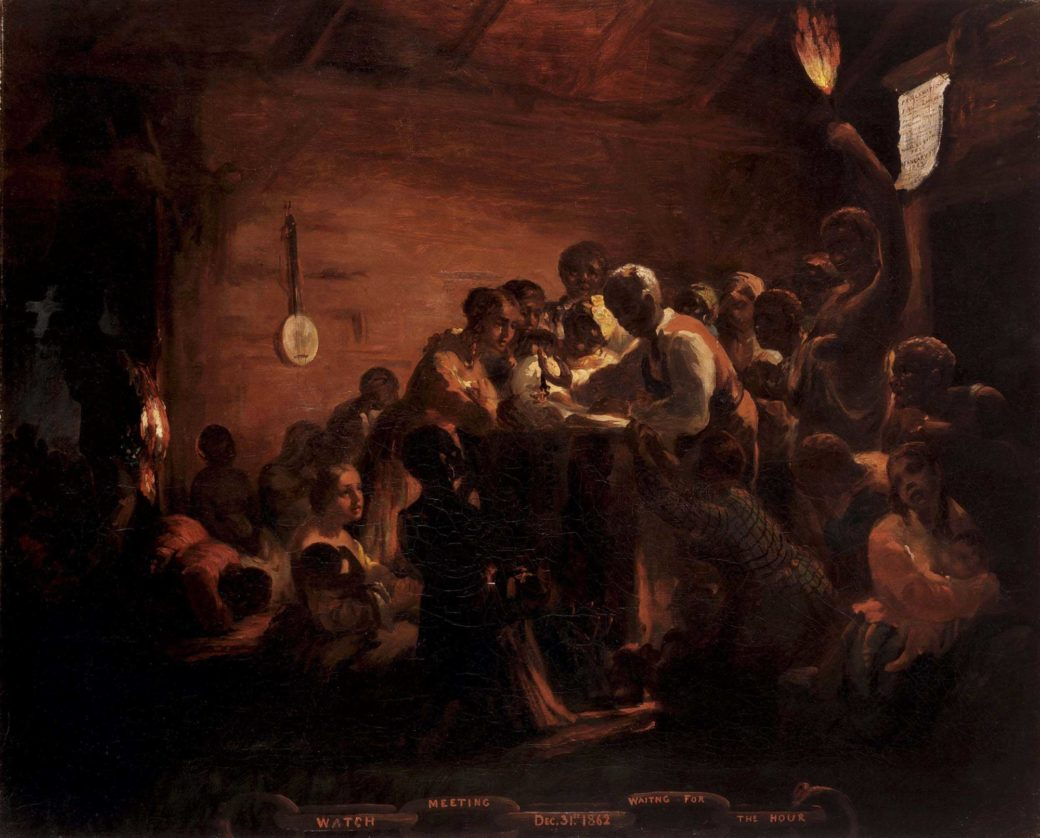
Waiting for the Hour (1863) by William Tolman Carlton

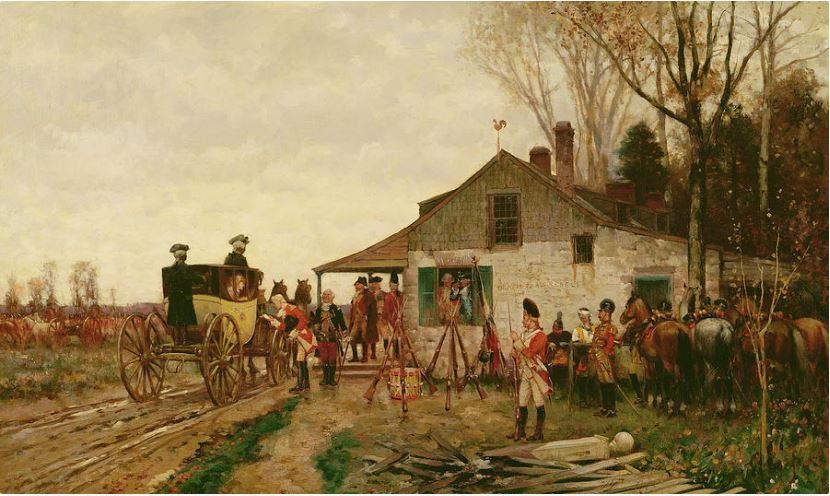
Passing the Outpost (1881) by Alfred Wordsworth Thompson

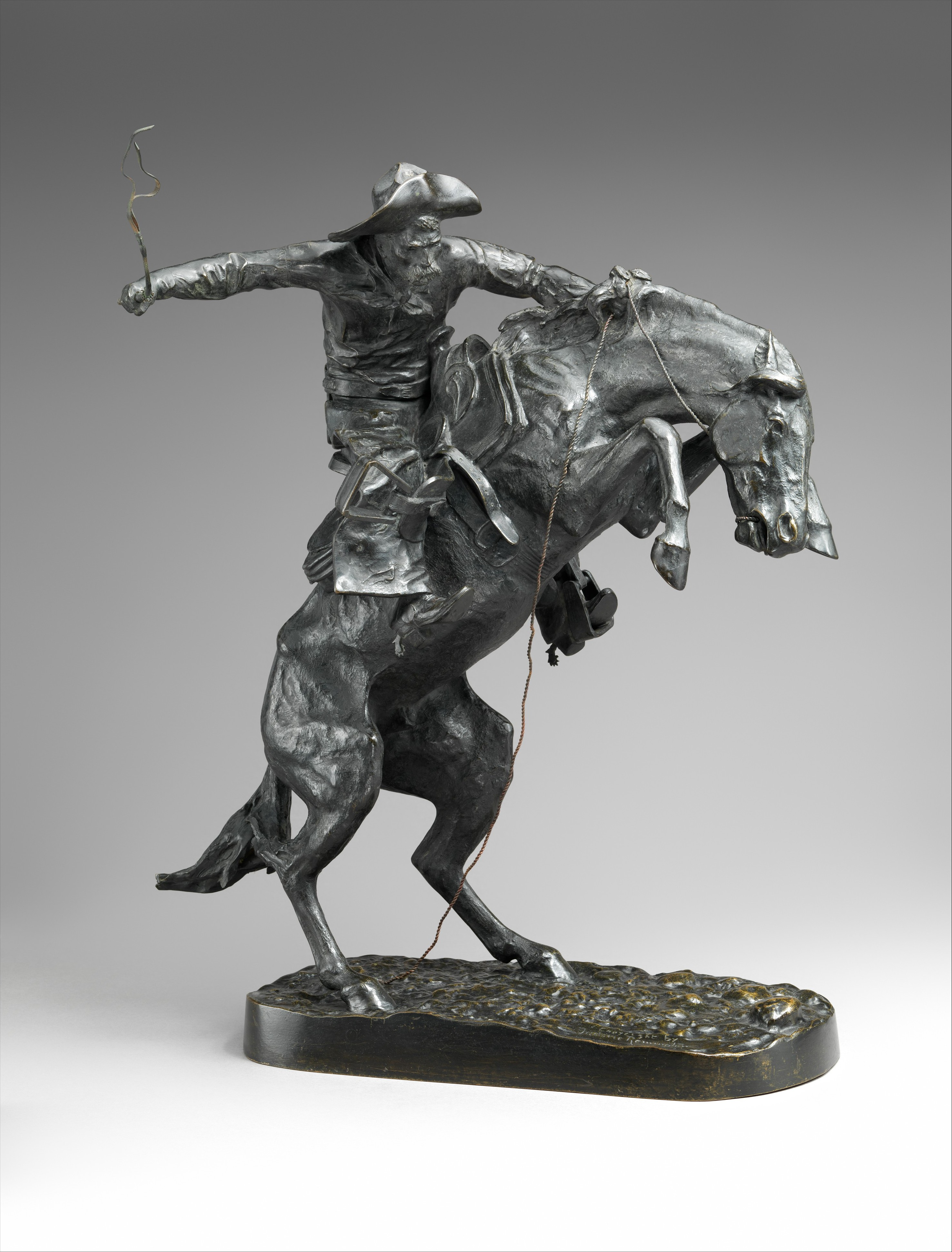
The Broncho Buster (1895) by Frederic Remington

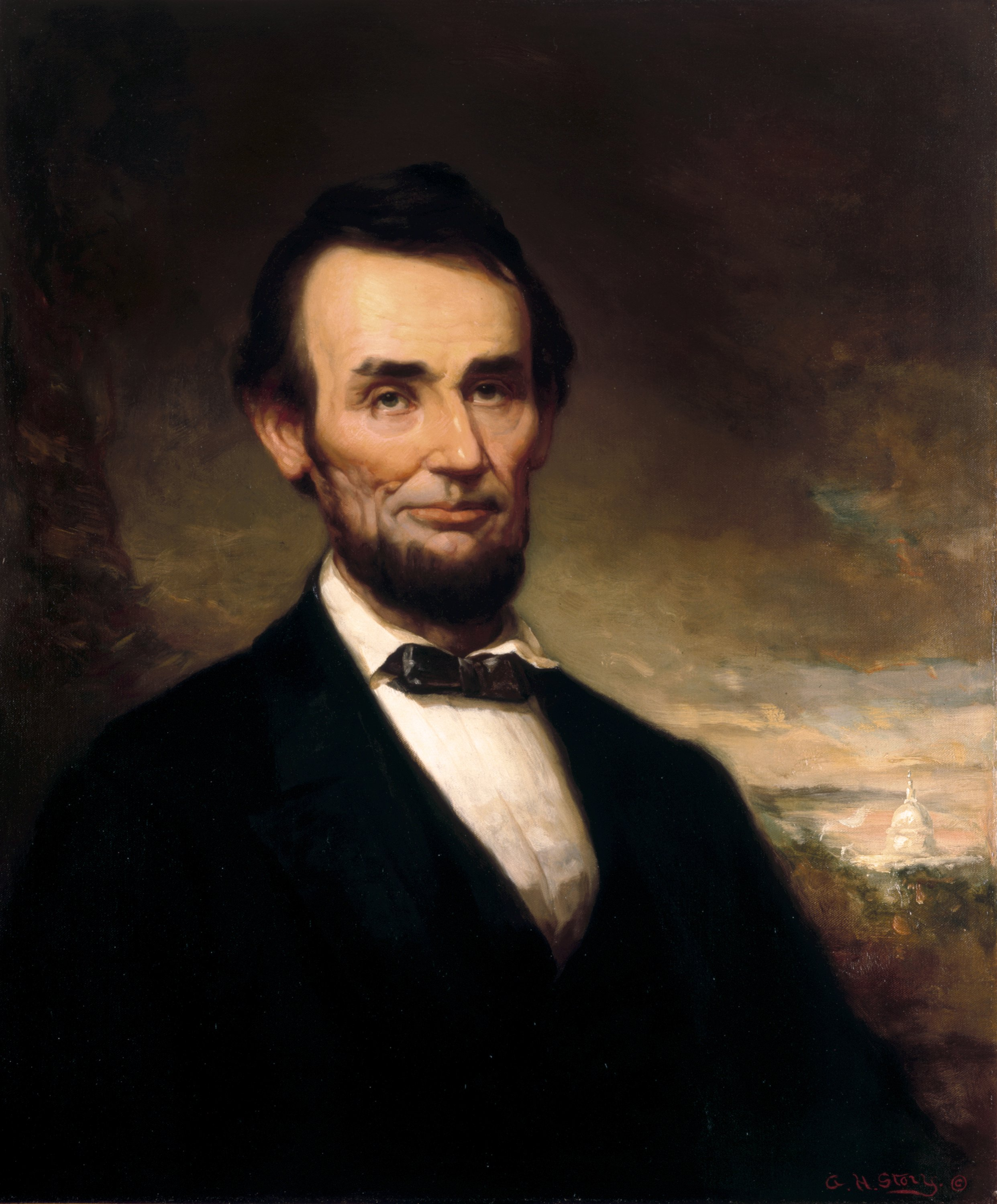
Abraham Lincoln (c.1915) by George Story

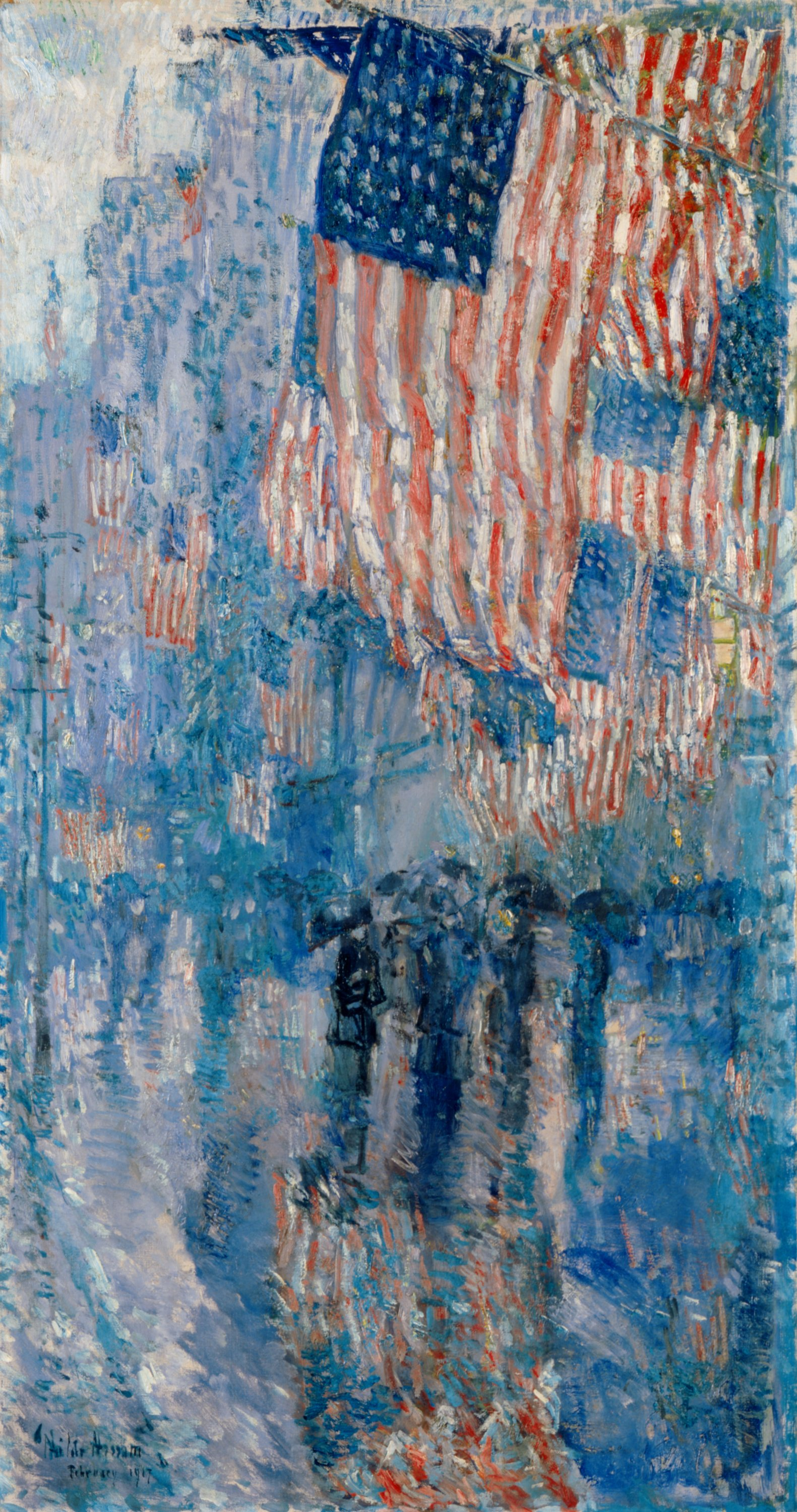
The Avenue in the Rain (1917) by Childe Hassam

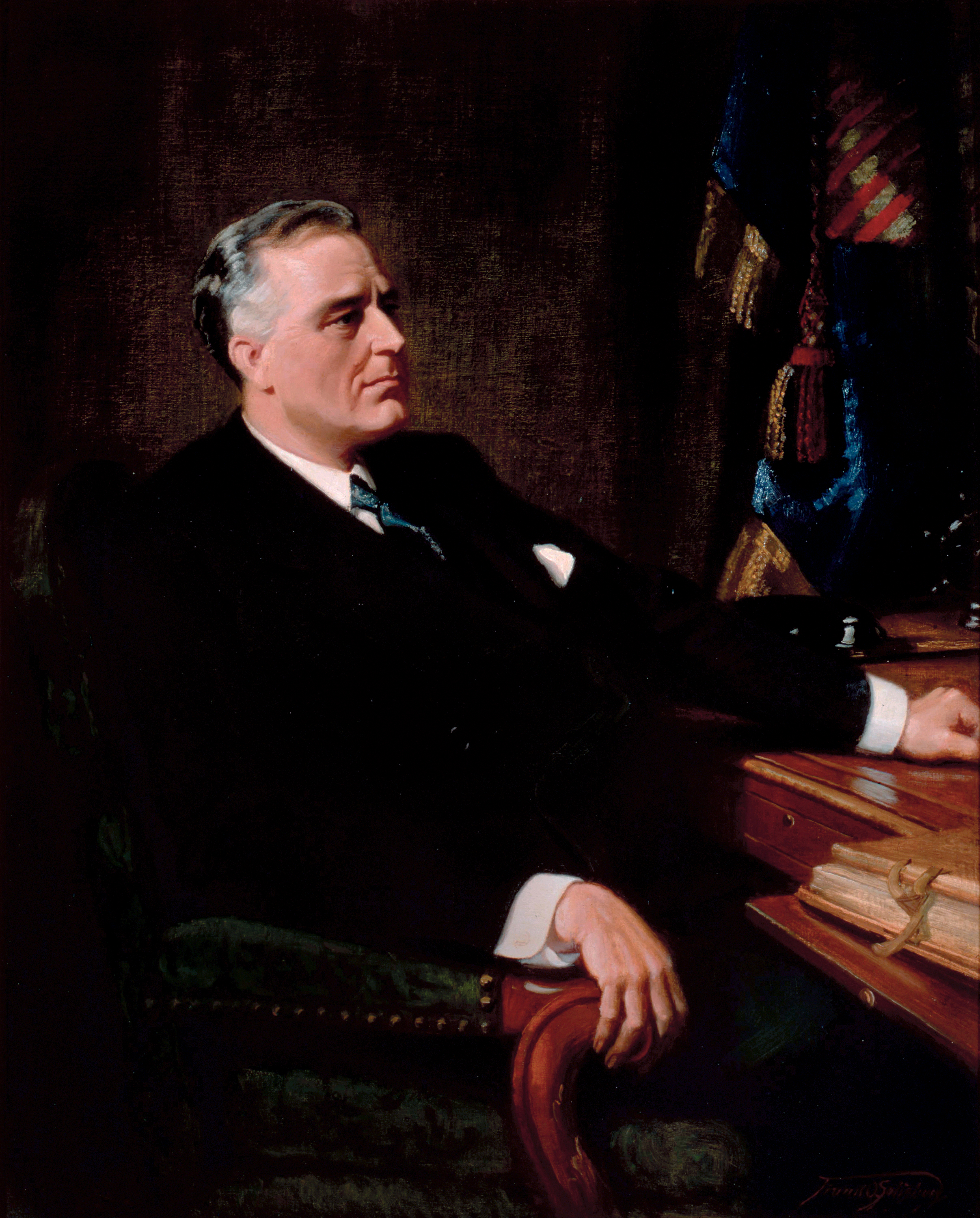
Franklin D. Roosevelt (1935) by Frank O. Salisbury

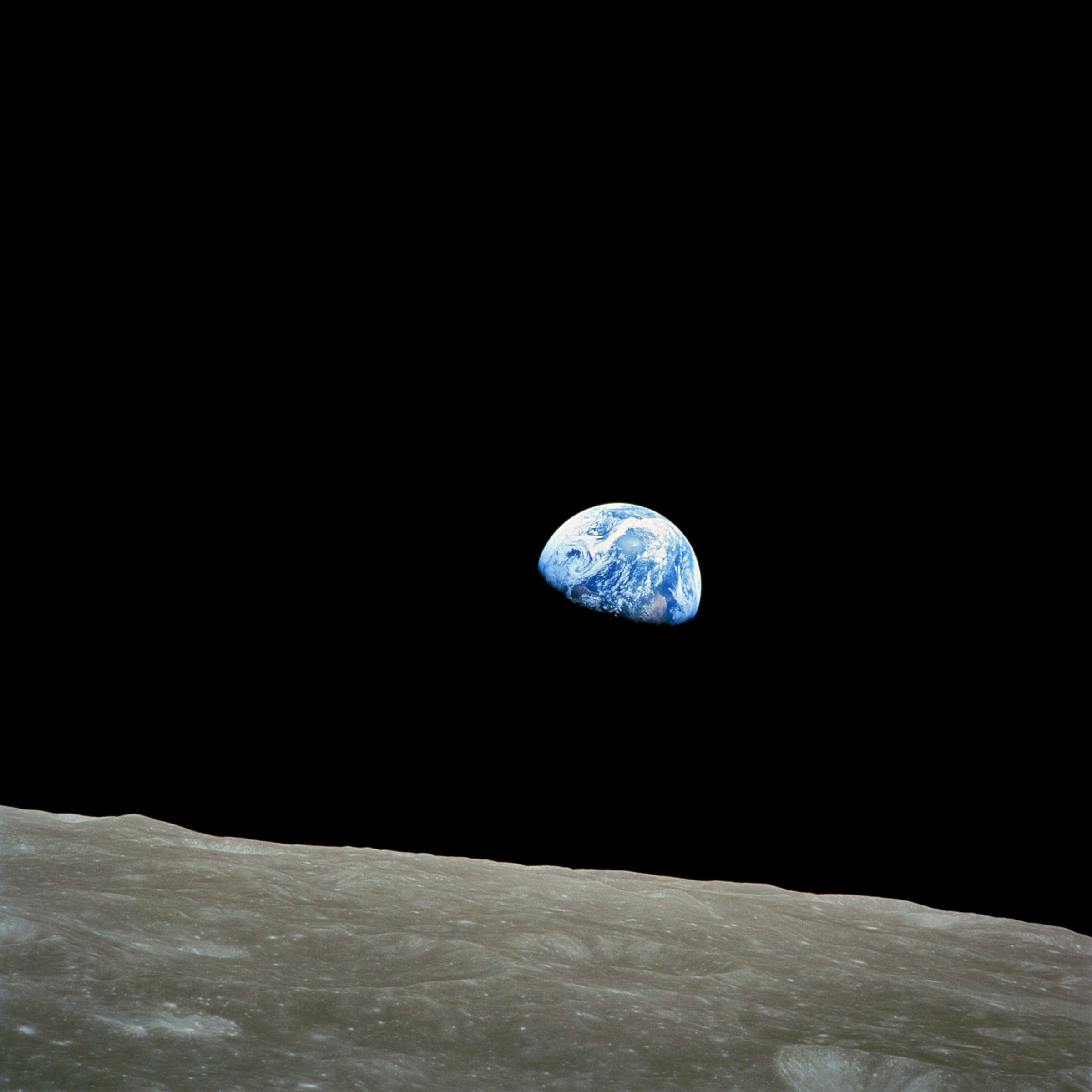
Earthrise (1968) by William Anders

=== Redecoration ===
A tradition evolved in the latter part of the twentieth century of each new administration redecorating the office to the president's liking. A new administration usually selects an oval carpet, new drapery, the paintings on the walls, and some furniture. Most incoming presidents continue using the rug of their predecessor until their new one is installed. The retired carpet very often is then moved to storage.

The redecoration of the Oval Office is usually coordinated by the first lady's office in the East Wing, working with an interior designer and the White House curator.

=== Alterations ===
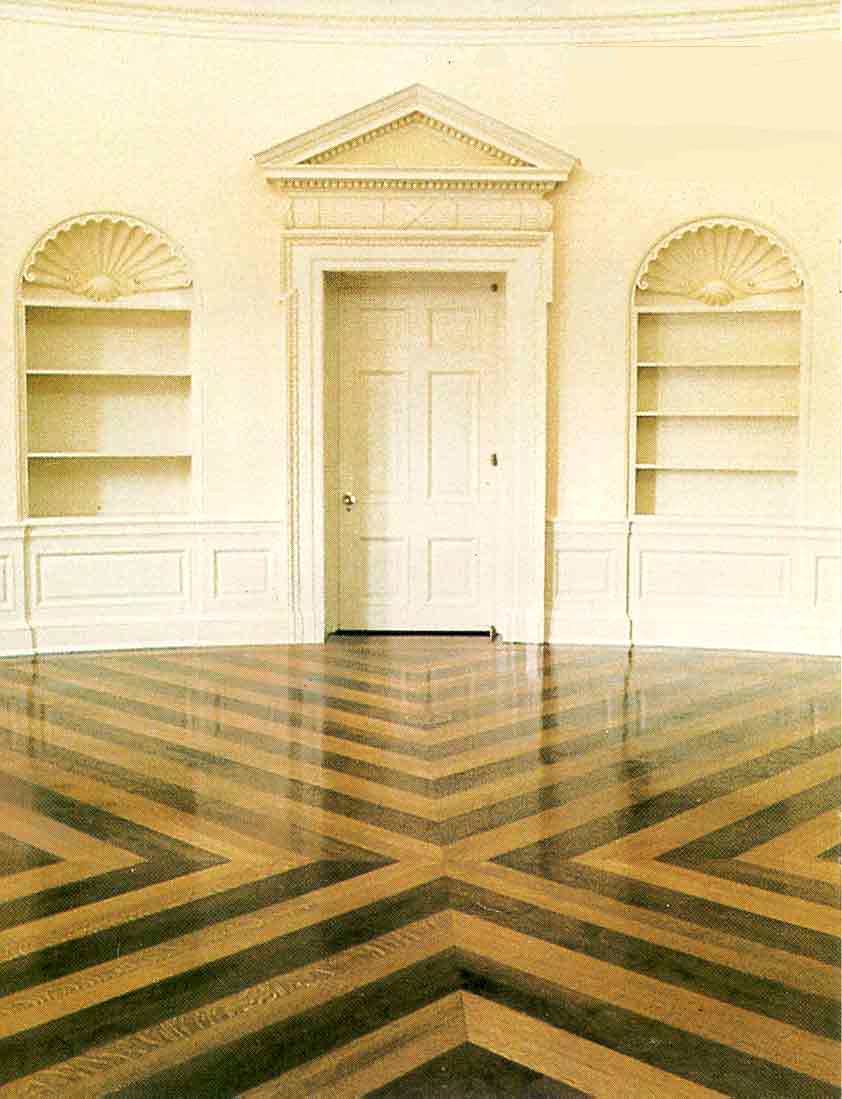
The Oval Office floor has been replaced several times, most recently during the administration of George W. Bush. The 2005 installation, based on the original 1933 design by Eric Gugler, features a contrasting cross pattern of quarter sawn oak and walnut.

Though some presidents have chosen to do day-to-day work in a smaller study just west of the Oval Office, most use the actual Oval Office for work and meetings. Traffic from the large numbers of staff, visitors, and pets over time takes its toll. There have been four sets of flooring in the Oval Office. The original floor was made of cork installed over softwood; however, President Eisenhower was an avid golfer and damaged the floor with his golf spikes. President Lyndon B. Johnson had the floor replaced in the mid-1960s with wood-grain linoleum. In 1982, President Ronald Reagan had the floor replaced with quarter sawn oak and walnut, in a cross parquet pattern similar in design to a 1933 Eric Gugler sketch, which had never been executed. In August 2005, the floor was replaced again under President George W. Bush, in exactly the same pattern as the Reagan floor.

=== Conservation ===
In the late 1980s, a comprehensive assessment of the entire house, including the Oval Office, was made as part of the National Park Service's Historic American Buildings Survey (HABS). Detailed photographs and measured drawings were made documenting the interior and exterior and showing even slight imperfections. A checklist of materials and methods was generated for future conservation and restoration.

On November 5, 2026, President Donald Trump designated the Oval Office, the Outer Oval Office, and the Cabinet Room as the Oval Office National Monument under the National Park Service by a presidential proclamation.

=== Dimensions ===
Dimensions	US	SI
Major axis (north-south)	35 ft 10 in	10.9 m
Minor axis (east-west)	29 ft	8.8 m
Eccentricity	0.59	0.59
Height	18 ft 6 in	5.6 m
Line of rise (the point at which the ceiling starts to arch)	16 ft 7 in	5.0 m
Approximate circumference	102 ft 5 in	31.2 m
Approximate area	816.2 sq ft	75.8 sq m

The ratio of the major axis to the minor axis is approximately 21:17 or 1.24.

== Gallery ==
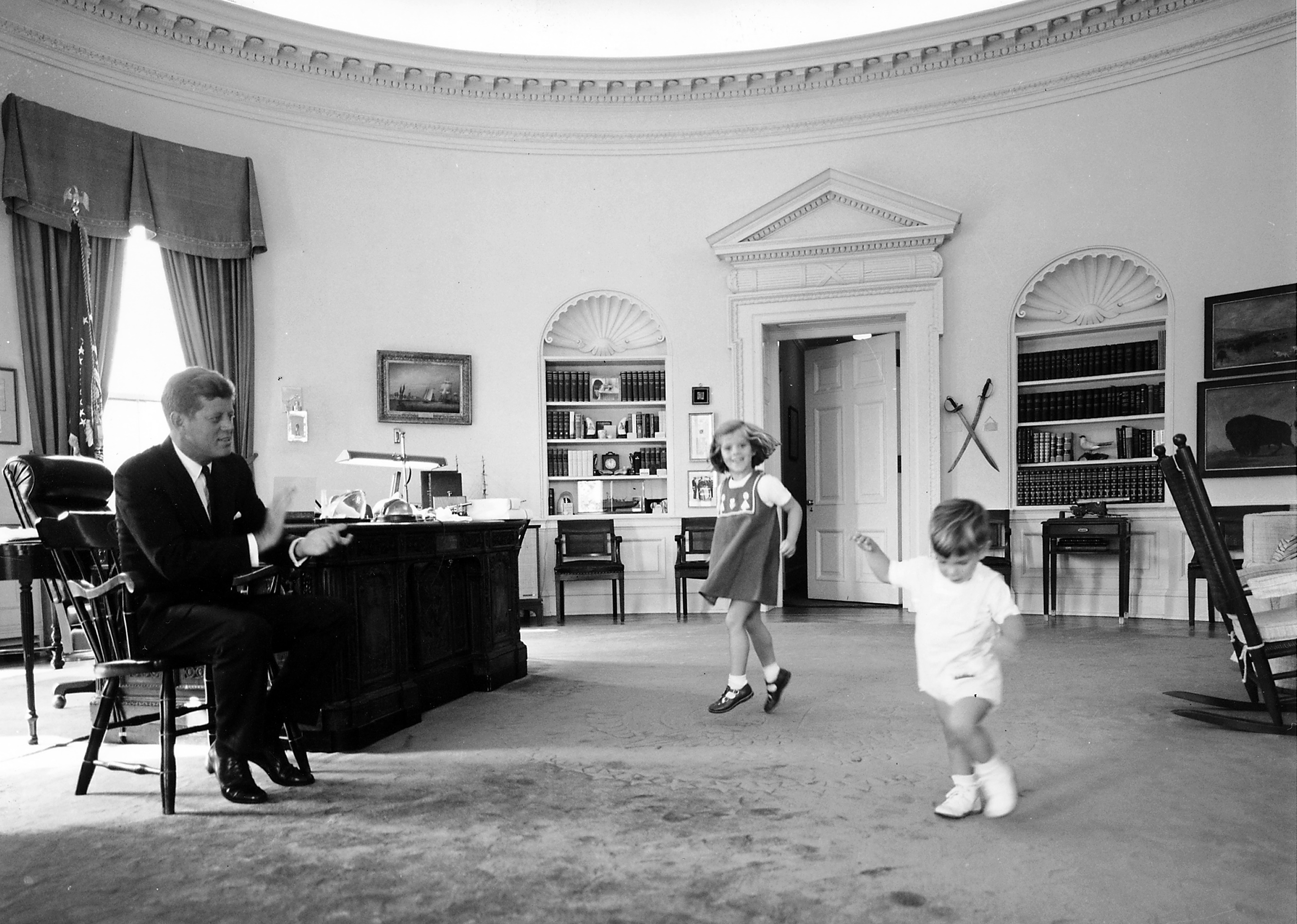
John F. Kennedy's children visit the Oval Office.

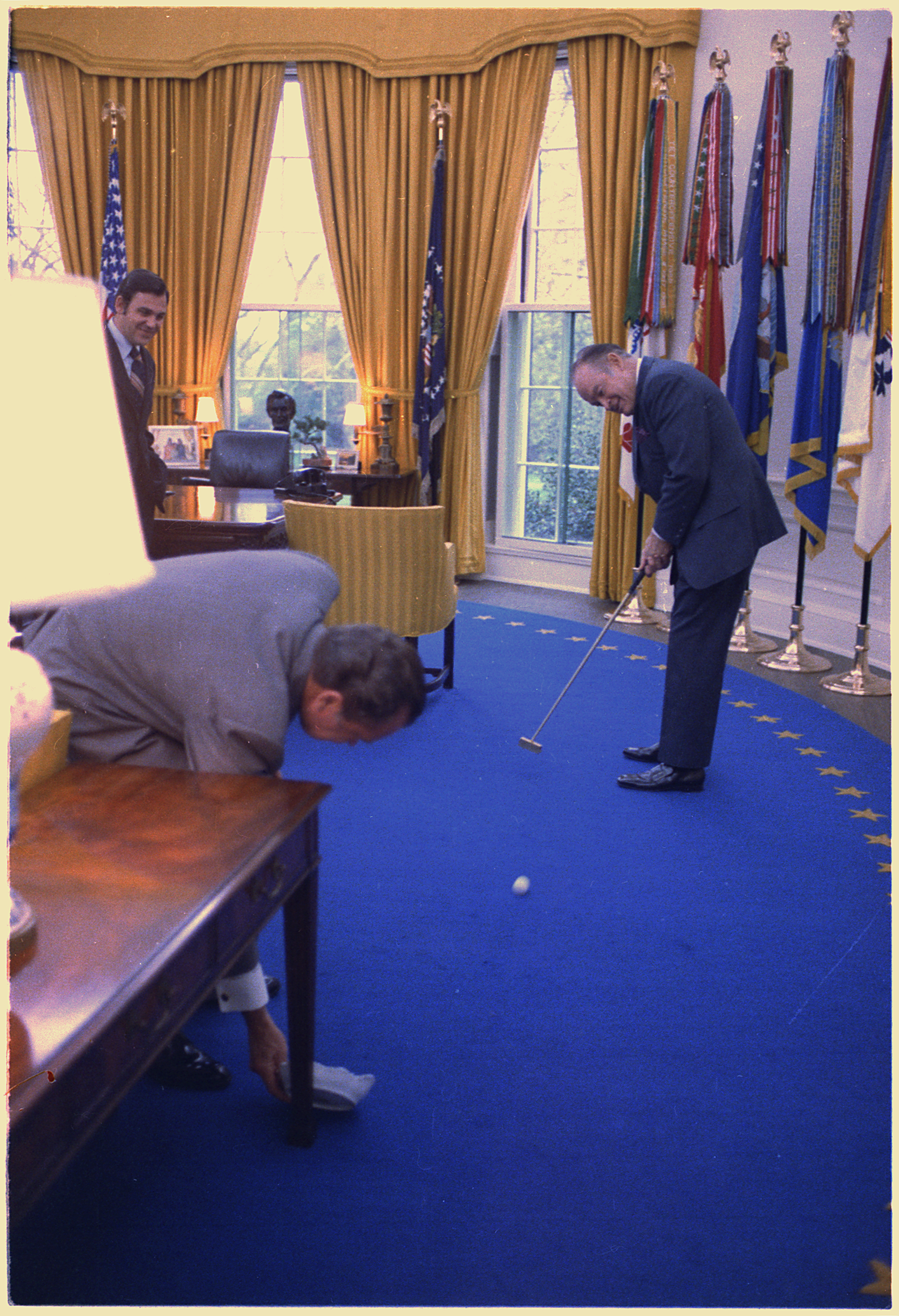
President Richard M. Nixon and Bob Hope play golf in the Oval Office.

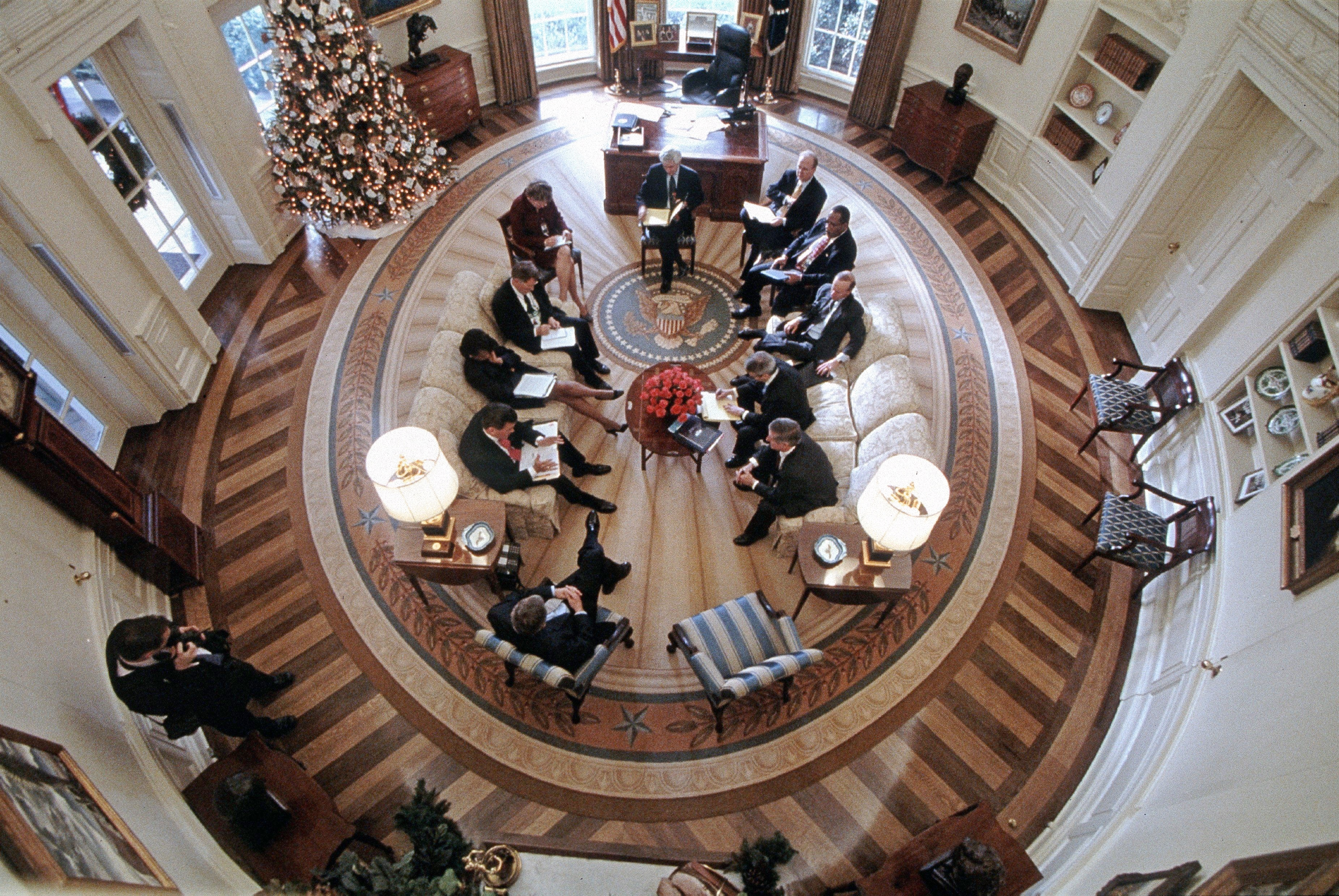
View from above: President George W. Bush seated at lower left holds meeting.

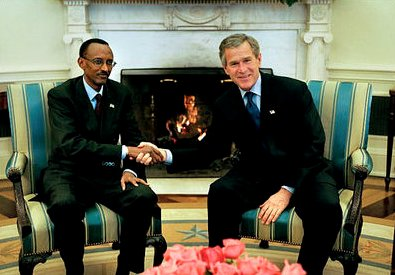
Traditional hand-shake photo seated in front of the fireplace. President G. W. Bush at right, the guest (Paul Kagame, President of Rwanda) to the left. One of the rare images where there is fire in the fireplace.

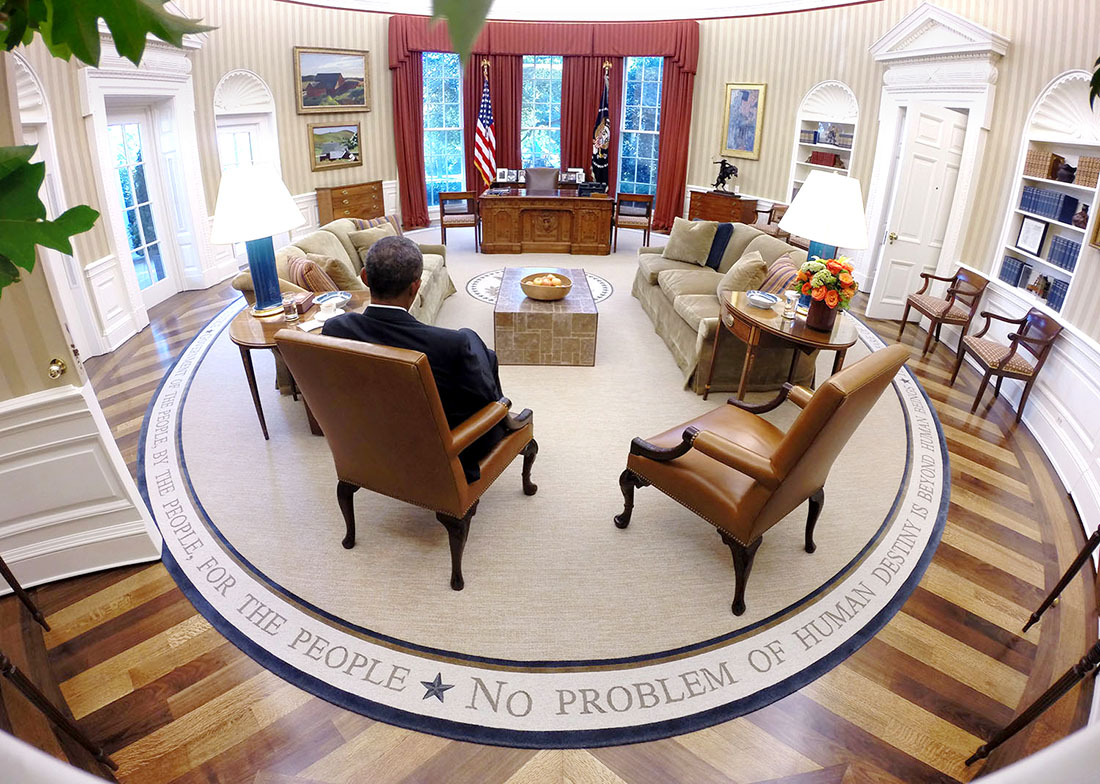
View from fireplace mantel: President Barack Obama from the back sitting near the fireplace with view toward desk, Rose Garden doorway at left, private study door ajar at right, and door to his secretary's office ajar at far left.

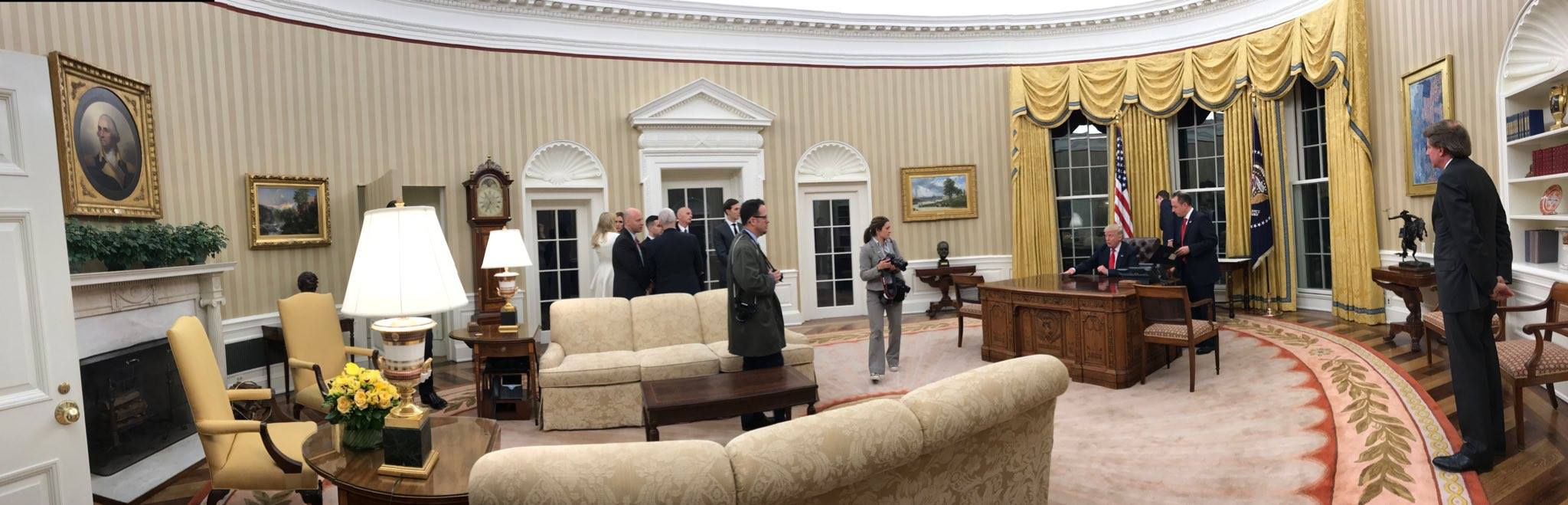
A panoramic view of the Oval Office, January 26, 2017. President Donald Trump is seated at the Resolute desk.

== Designs and furnishings ==
President	Image	Designer	Furnishings	Paintings Sculptures Personal mementos/Misc.	Notes
William Howard Taft; 1909–1913		Nathan C. Wyeth, 1909	Marble Neoclassical mantel; Bookcases with glass doors; Lighting fixtures by E. F. Caldwell & Co.; Walls covered in green burlap; Skylight; Theodore Roosevelt desk; Green drapery; Green rug; 2 leather "Davenport" sofas; Leather armchairs; Side chairs covered in leather		Theodore Roosevelt Executive Office, c.1905.: President Taft moved the Theodore Roosevelt desk and furniture to the Oval Office.
Woodrow Wilson; 1913–1921			Marble Neoclassical mantel; Bookcases with glass doors; Lighting fixtures by E. F. Caldwell & Co.; Walls covered in green burlap; Skylight; Theodore Roosevelt desk; Green drapery; Green rug; 2 leather "Davenport" sofas; Leather armchairs; Side chairs covered in leather		President Wilson rarely used the Oval Office, preferring to work in the Treaty Room.
Warren G. Harding; 1921–1923			Marble Neoclassical mantel; Bookcases with glass doors; Lighting fixtures by E. F. Caldwell & Co.; Walls covered in green burlap; Skylight; Theodore Roosevelt desk; Green drapery; Green rug; 2 leather "Davenport" sofas; Leather armchairs; Side chairs covered in leather		President Harding died in office on August 2, 1923. This photo, taken on the day of his funeral, shows mourning crepes tied to the desk chair and blotter.
Calvin Coolidge; 1923–1929			Marble Neoclassical mantel; Bookcases with glass doors; Lighting fixtures by E. F. Caldwell & Co.; Walls covered in green burlap; Skylight; Theodore Roosevelt desk; Green drapery; Green rug; 2 leather "Davenport" sofas; Leather armchairs; Side chairs covered in leather		President Coolidge's first official photograph, taken August 15, 1923.
Herbert Hoover; 1929–1933			Before fire: Theodore Roosevelt desk; After fire: Hoover desk; Art Moderne-style sconces; 6 cane-back armchairs; Upholstered furniture		Following the December 24, 1929 fire, President Hoover and his staff relocated to the adjacent State, War, and Navy Building. He restored the West Wing as it had been, but installed air conditioning. He replaced the Taft Oval Office's Colonial-Revival lighting fixtures with Art Moderne ones, replaced its leather sofas and chairs with upholstered furniture, and added the 6 cane-back armchairs that were used in the modern Oval Office for decades until the end of the first Trump administration in 2021.
Franklin D. Roosevelt; 1933–1945			Hoover desk		Note the Art Moderne sconces between the windows of the restored Oval Office, in this 1933 photo.: President Roosevelt moved the marble mantel, 2 of the sconces, the rug, drapery, desk, and furniture to the modern Oval Office.
Franklin D. Roosevelt; 1933–1945		Eric Gugler, 1934	Marble mantel (from prior Oval Office); 2 sconces (from prior Oval Office); Hoover desk; Green drapery; Green rug; Arched-back desk chair; Arched-back armchairs (against the wall); "Lawson" sofa (against the wall); 6 cane-back armchairs	George Washington by Rembrandt Peale; Prints of the Hudson Valley; Ship models	Oval Office replica at Franklin D. Roosevelt Presidential Library and Museum.
Harry S. Truman; 1945–1953			Theodore Roosevelt desk; Gray drapery; Blue-gray rug with the Presidential Seal; Television set	George Washington by Rembrandt Peale; George Washington by Luis Cadena (gift of Ecuador); Simón Bolívar by Tito Salas (gift of Venezuela); José de San Martín, copy after Jean Baptiste Madou (gift of Argentina); USS Constitution by Gordon Grant; Missouri State Seal plaque; Fired On by Frederic Remington; Equestrian Statue of Andrew Jackson by Charles Keck; Photograph of Portrait of Franklin Delano Roosevelt by Frank O. Salisbury; Prints of biplanes and sailing ships; Jet-airplane models	Oval Office replica at Harry S. Truman Presidential Library. In 1933, as presiding judge of Jackson County, Missouri, Truman commissioned sculptor Charles Keck to create a larger-than-life equestrian statue of Andrew Jackson for the under-construction Kansas City Courthouse. The new courthouse was dedicated on December 27, 1934, and Truman's 10-year-old daughter Margaret unveiled the statue. Keck presented a model of the equestrian statue to Truman, which he later displayed in his Oval Office.
Dwight D. Eisenhower; 1953–1961			Theodore Roosevelt desk; Truman drapery; Truman rug	Landscape paintings; Seated Lincoln by Gutzon Borglum	Seated Lincoln by Gutzon Borglum.
John F. Kennedy; 1961–1963		Stéphane Boudin, 1963	Resolute desk; Truman drapery; Truman rug; Rocking chair 2 white sofas (not against the wall); Round coffee table, with phone attached; Replaced Art Moderne sconces with brass lanterns; See notes.	USS United States vs. HMS Macedonian by Thomas Birch; The White House Long Ago by Jacqueline Kennedy; Constitution – Guerriere by Michele Felice Corne; Bonhomme Richard by Thomas Buttersworth; Buffalo Bull by George Catlin; Buffalo Hunt Under Wolf Skin Masks by George Catlin; Photographs of sailboats; Ship models	Oval Office replica at John F. Kennedy Presidential Library and Museum. First Lady Jacqueline Kennedy restored the Resolute desk. The Oval Office was undergoing redecoration at the time of Kennedy's assassination. Lyndon B. Johnson retained the new white drapery, but chose not to use the new red rug.
Lyndon B. Johnson; 1963–1969			Johnson desk; Kennedy red rug (First term) Truman rug (Second term); Kennedy white drapery; Cabinet for Teletype; Banquette with three televisions; Kennedy rocking chair; Kennedy white sofas; Round coffee table, with phone in drawer; Federal-style tall-case clock; Replaced Kennedy brass lanterns with Neoclassical brass sconces; Covered floor with wood-grained linoleum	George Washington by Gilbert Stuart; Andrew Jackson by Thomas Sully; Thomas Jefferson by Gilbert Stuart; Franklin D. Roosevelt by Elizabeth Shoumatoff; The Bronco Buster by Frederic Remington; Bust of Lyndon B. Johnson (1966) by Jimilu Mason	Oval Office replica at Lyndon Baines Johnson Library and Museum.
Richard Nixon; 1969–1974			Wilson desk; Gold drapery; Royal blue rug; Gold sofas	1st. George Washington by Gilbert Stuart; 2nd. George Washington by Rembrandt Peale; 3rd. George Washington by Charles Willson Peale; The President's House, copy after William Henry Bartlett; Bust of Abraham Lincoln by Leo Cherne; Bird figurines by Edward Marshall Boehm; Earthrise (photograph of the Earth from the Moon's orbit)	Oval Office replica at Richard Nixon Presidential Library and Museum. First Lady Pat Nixon designed the Oval Office's royal blue rug.
Gerald Ford; 1974–1977			Wilson desk; Red drapery; Yellow floral rug; 2 yellow Queen Anne-style armchairs; 2 yellow wing chairs; 2 striped sofas; Seymour tall-case clock; Removed the brass sconces	George Washington by Charles Willson Peale; The President's House, copy after William Henry Bartlett; Eastport and Passamaquoddy Bay by Victor de Grailly; City of Washington from Beyond the Navy Yard by George Cooke; Benjamin Franklin by Charles Willson Peale; "Benjamin Franklin" by Jean-Baptiste Greuze; Passing the Outpost by Alfred Wadsworth Thompson; Standing Lincoln by Adolph Alexander Weinman; The Bronco Buster by Frederic Remington	Oval Office replica at Gerald R. Ford Presidential Museum.
Jimmy Carter; 1977–1981		1977	Resolute desk; Ford drapery; Ford rug; Placed the Ford sofas back-to-back	George Washington by Charles Willson Peale.; The President's House, copy after William Henry Bartlett; Eastport and Passamaquoddy Bay by Victor de Grailly; The City of Washington from Beyond the Navy Yard by George Cooke; "Benjamin Franklin" by Jean-Baptiste Greuze; Passing the Outpost by Alfred Wadsworth Thompson; Bust of Benjamin Franklin by Jean-Antoine Houdon; Bust of George Washington by Hiram Powers; Bust of Thomas Jefferson by Jean-Antoine Houdon; The Bronco Buster by Frederic Remington; Bust of Harry S. Truman by Charles Keck; Ship model	Oval Office replica at Jimmy Carter Library and Museum.
Ronald Reagan; 1981–1989		Ted Graber, 1981; Ted Graber, 1988	Resolute desk; Ford drapery; Ford rug (First term) "Sunburst" rug (Second term); Replaced the wood floor	George Washington by Charles Willson Peale; The President's House, copy after William Henry Bartlett; Eastport and Passamaquoddy Bay by Victor de Grailly; The City of Washington from Beyond the Navy Yard by George Cooke; Andrew Jackson by Thomas Sully; Seventh Regiment Encampment by Sanford R. Gifford; Passing the Outpost by Alfred Wadsworth Thompson; The Bronco Buster by Frederic Remington; Rattlesnake by Frederic Remington; The Great Saddles of the West by Paul Rossi; Ol' Sabertooth by Harry Jackson; Cowboy's Meditation by Harry Jackson: Buffalo Skull by James L. Clark; Numerous family photographs	Oval Office replica at Ronald Reagan Presidential Library. First Lady Nancy Reagan designed the "Sunburst" rug.
George H. W. Bush; 1989–1993		Mark Hampton, 1990	Resolute desk (first few months into term) C&O desk; Ford drapery (first few months into term) Pale blue drapery; Reagan sunburst rug (first few months into term) Pale blue rug; Pale white sofas	George Washington by Rembrandt Peale; The President's House, copy after William Henry Bartlett; Rutland Falls, Vermont by Frederic Edwin Church; The Three Tetons by Thomas Moran; Andrew Jackson by Thomas Sully; Benjamin Henry Latrobe by Charles Willson Peale; Model of HMS Resolute; The Bronco Buster by Frederic Remington; Rattlesnake by Frederic Remington; Numerous family pictures	Oval Office replica at George Bush Presidential Library.
Bill Clinton; 1993–2001		Kaki Hockersmith, 1993	Resolute desk; Yellow drapery; Navy blue rug; Striped red and white sofas	George Washington by Rembrandt Peale; The Avenue in the Rain by Childe Hassam; The City of Washington from Beyond the Navy Yard by George Cooke; Waiting for the Hour by William Tolman Carlton; Andrew Jackson by Thomas Sully; The Three Tetons by Thomas Moran; The President's House, copy after William Henry Bartlett; The Bronco Buster by Frederic Remington; The Thinker by Auguste Rodin; Appeal to the Great Spirit by Cyrus Dallin; Bust of Abraham Lincoln by Robert Berks; Bust of Franklin D. Roosevelt by Jo Davidson; Numerous family pictures	Oval Office replica at William J. Clinton Presidential Library.
George W. Bush; 2001–2009		Ken Blasingame, 2001	Resolute desk; Gold drapery; "Sunbeam" rug; Cream-colored sofas; Replaced the wood floor	George Washington by Rembrandt Peale.; A Charge to Keep by W. H. D. Koerner; Rio Grande by Tom Lea; Near San Antonio by Julian Onderdonk; Chili Queens at the Alamo by Julian Onderdonk; Cactus Flower by Julian Onderdonk; Abraham Lincoln by George Henry Story; The Bronco Buster by Frederic Remington; Rattlesnake by Frederic Remington; Bust of Dwight D. Eisenhower by Nison Tregor; Bust of Abraham Lincoln by Augustus Saint-Gaudens; Bust of Winston Churchill by Jacob Epstein (lent by British Prime Minister Tony Blair from the British Government Art Collection); Numerous family pictures	Oval Office replica at George W. Bush Presidential Center. First Lady Laura Bush designed the "Sunbeam" rug.
Barack Obama; 2009–2017		Michael S. Smith, 2010	Resolute desk; G.W. Bush gold drapery (first few months into term) Red drapery; G.W. Bush Sunbeam rug (first few months into term) Taupe rug with quotes in border; G.W. Bush cream-colored sofas (first few months into term) Fawn-colored cotton velvet sofas; Striped wallpaper	George Washington by Rembrandt Peale; The Avenue in the Rain by Childe Hassam; Working on the Statue of Liberty by Norman Rockwell; The Three Tetons by Thomas Moran; Abraham Lincoln by George Henry Story; Cobb's Barns, South Truro by Edward Hopper; Burly Cobb's House, South Truro by Edward Hopper; The Bronco Buster by Frederic Remington; Bust of Abraham Lincoln by Augustus Saint-Gaudens; Bust of Martin Luther King Jr. by Charles Alston; Copy of the Emancipation Proclamation; Numerous family pictures	The rug's border incorporates quotes from Abraham Lincoln (Government of the people, by the people, for the people.), Theodore Roosevelt (The welfare of each of us fundamentally depends upon the welfare of all of us.), Franklin D. Roosevelt (The only thing we have to fear is fear itself.), John F. Kennedy (No problem of human beings is beyond human destiny.), and Martin Luther King Jr (The arc of the moral universe is long, but it bends towards justice.).
Donald Trump; 2017–2021		2017	Resolute desk; Clinton drapery; Reagan sunburst rug; Obama wallpaper (first few months into term) White & gray brocade wallpaper; G.W. Bush cream-colored sofas; Additional American and presidential flags; Military flags	Andrew Jackson by Ralph Eleaser Whiteside Earl; Abraham Lincoln by George Henry Story; George Washington by Rembrandt Peale; Thomas Jefferson by Gilbert Stuart; Alexander Hamilton by John Trumbull; Thomas Jefferson by Rembrandt Peale; Benjamin Franklin by Joseph Duplessis; The Bronco Buster by Frederic Remington; Bust of Abraham Lincoln by Augustus Saint-Gaudens; Bust of Winston Churchill by Jacob Epstein; Bust of Martin Luther King Jr. by Charles Alston; Equestrian statue of Andrew Jackson by Clark Mills; Letter from President Nixon; Numerous family pictures; Collection of Challenge coins; Wounded Warrior Project Award; Replica of Miniature FIFA World Cup Trophy; Trump International Golf Club Championship trophy	President Trump initially used the Obama striped wallpaper, but replaced it with white and gray brocade wallpaper during renovations made in August 2017. He initially placed two different portraits of Thomas Jefferson in the office, but later replaced the one by Rembrandt Peale with a portrait of Benjamin Franklin by Joseph Duplessis. He also positioned Lincoln's portrait above his bust near the desk. The miniature World Cup replica was a gift presented upon the US being named a host country for the 2026 FIFA World Cup.
Joe Biden; 2021–2025		2021	Resolute desk; Clinton drapery; Clinton navy blue rug; Trump wallpaper; G.W. Bush cream-colored sofas	Franklin Delano Roosevelt by Frank O. Salisbury; Thomas Jefferson by Gilbert Stuart; Alexander Hamilton by John Trumbull; Abraham Lincoln by George Henry Story; George Washington by Gilbert Stuart; Benjamin Franklin by Jean-Baptiste Greuze; The Avenue in the Rain by Childe Hassam The City of Washington from Beyond the Navy Yard by George Cooke; Swift Messenger by Allan Houser: Bust of Martin Luther King Jr. by Charles Alston; Bust of Robert F. Kennedy by Robert Berks; Bust of Eleanor Roosevelt; Bust of Cesar Chavez by Paul Suarez; Bust of Rosa Parks by Artis Lane; Bust of Abraham Lincoln by Augustus Saint-Gaudens; Bust of Harry S.Truman by William J. Williams; Moon rock returned by Apollo 17 crew Gold framed 10" TV; Numerous family pictures; Numerous books; Family Bible; Presidential Medal of Freedom	Presidential Medal of Freedom awarded to then Vice President Biden by Barack Obama in 2017
Donald Trump; 2025–present		2025	Resolute desk; C&O desk (briefly used as temporary replacement during the Resolute desk's refurbishing); Clinton drapery; Reagan sunburst rug; Trump wallpaper; G.W. Bush cream-colored sofas; Additional American and presidential flags; Military flags	Paintings: Andrew Jackson by Miner Kilbourne Kellogg; Abraham Lincoln by George Henry Story; George Washington by Rembrandt Peale; George Washington by Charles Willson Peale; Martin Van Buren by Francis Alexander; Theodore Roosevelt by Fülöp László; James Monroe by Thomas Sully; John Adams by Gilbert Stuart; Thomas Jefferson by Gilbert Stuart; Alexander Hamilton by John Trumbull; Benjamin Franklin by Jean-Baptiste Greuze; Zachary Taylor by John Vanderlyn; Franklin D. Roosevelt by Alfred Jonniaux; James Buchanan by John Henry Brown; Ulysses S. Grant by Thomas Le Clear; James K. Polk by Max Westfield; Ronald Reagan by Everett Raymond Kinstler; Jacqueline Bouvier Kennedy by Aaron Shikler; Thomas Jefferson by Rembrandt Peale; Theodore Roosevelt by John Singer Sargent; Ronald Reagan by Everett Raymond Kinstler; Statues: Bust of Benjamin Franklin by Jean-Antoine Houdon; Bust of Abraham Lincoln by Augustus Saint-Gaudens; Bust of Winston Churchill by Jacob Epstein; Bust of Dwight D. Eisenhower by Nison Tregor; Bust of Theodore Roosevelt; Statue of George Washington by Gyula Bezerédi; The Presidential American Patriot by Lorenzo Gighlieri and Mark Russo; Battle of Iwo Jima statue by Dave Vennell; Documents: Framed copy of the US Declaration of Independence; Office desk: FIFA Peace Prize Trophy; Replica of FIFA World Cup Trophy; Back desk: Numerous family pictures; Side table: FIFA Club World Cup Trophy; Adjacent hallway: Framed copy of the New York Post featuring Trump's mug shot; Dining room: Collection of challenge coins; Replica of WBC championship belt; Replica of UFC championship belt; Numerous New York Post front page commemorative plaques; 60 inch flat screen TV; President Trump initially restored the portrait layout of his first term, then filled the room with more portraits shortly after.; Trump added numerous gold statues and ornamentation (particularly around the fireplace) in February 2025, simulating the aesthetics of his Trump Tower apartment in New York City and Mar-a-Lago estate in Palm Beach, Florida.; After FIFA handed the FIFA Club World Cup Trophy over to US President Donald Trump for custody, he elected to keep it installed in the Oval Office, and FIFA presented the competition winners with a replica.	

== See also ==
- Oval Office grandfather clock
- Presidential call button
