= Tito Salas =

Venezuelan painter (1887–1974)

- Tito Salas in the mid-1930s
- Born: Británico Antonio Salas Díaz; 8 May 1887; Caracas, Venezuela
- Died: 18 March 1974 (aged 86); Caracas, Venezuela
- Known for: Painting

Británico Antonio Salas Díaz, better known as Tito Salas (8 May 1887 – 18 March 1974), was a Venezuelan painter, considered a significant contributor in the development of Venezuelan modern art.
