= Hoover desk =

Oval Office desk

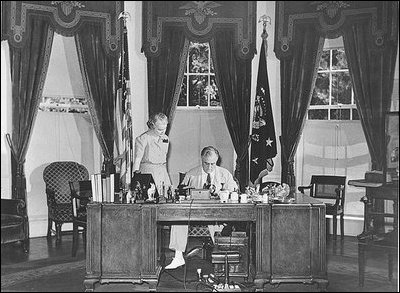
- Franklin D. Roosevelt working at the Hoover desk in the Oval Office
- Designer: J. Stuart Clingman (built by the Robert W. Irwin Company)
- Date: 1930; 96 years ago
- Made in: Grand Rapids, Michigan
- Materials: American lumber, faced with Michigan-grown maple
- Style / tradition: block front desk
- Height: 30.75 in (78.1 cm)
- Width: 82.5 in (210 cm)
- Depth: 45.5 in (116 cm)
- Collection: Franklin D. Roosevelt Presidential Library and Museum

The Hoover desk, also known colloquially as FDR's Oval Office desk, is a large block front desk, used by presidents Herbert Hoover and Franklin D. Roosevelt in the Oval Office. Created in 1930 as a part of a 17-piece office suite by furniture makers from Grand Rapids, Michigan, the Art Deco desk was given to the White House by the Grand Rapids Furniture Manufacturers Association during the Hoover administration.

The desk was designed by J. Stuart Clingman, and was built by the Robert W. Irwin Company from American lumber and faced with Michigan-grown maple burl wood veneer. After Roosevelt's sudden death in 1945, Harry S. Truman removed the desk from the Oval Office and gave it to Roosevelt's wife, Eleanor Roosevelt. She displayed it at, and later donated it to, the Franklin D. Roosevelt Presidential Library and Museum in Hyde Park, New York. The desk has been on display there ever since. The Hoover desk is one of six desks to be used by a president in the Oval Office.

== Design and markings ==
The Hoover desk is an 82.5-inch-wide (210 cm), 45.5-inch-deep (116 cm), and 30.75-inch-tall (78.1 cm) traditionally designed desk. It was designed by J. Stuart Clingman and was created in the "Royal" plant of the Robert W. Irwin Company. An article in the Grand Rapids Spectator published just after the desk was constructed describes it as taking design cues from both Queen Anne and Colonial New England furniture styles. The Franklin D. Roosevelt Presidential Library and Museum describes the desk as being Art Deco in style.

The desk has a block front design motif with the drawers and back panels swelling outward with an overall intricate, tooled design. The desk has three drawers, and a single flat top extender drawer, in each pedestal. The two pedestals are spanned by a center section containing a single center drawer. The center drawer has a lock numbered 76P25, but the FDR Library and Museum believes the key to this lock was lost before the desk was donated to them.

The pulls attached to the drawers, and the knobs on the flat extenders, are described as being hand-wrought bronze in a 1930 article about the desk from Good Furniture and Decoration. The FDR Library and Museum claims they are made of brass. The desk is completely made of American lumber, faced with Michigan-grown maple burl wood veneer, and finished in a rich French Walnut tone. The desk has an engraved plate attached to it which states: "This desk presented to the President of the United States by the Grand Rapids Furniture Manufacturers Association. It is made entirely of American woods. All exterior parts are Michigan Maple. A.D. 1930."

== History ==
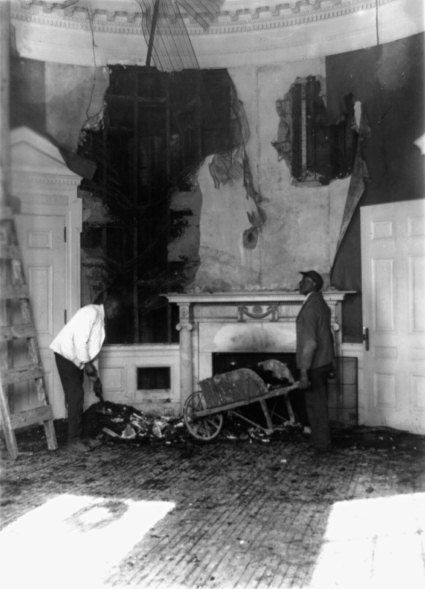
A photo taken on December 26, 1929, showing the damage to the Oval Office from the Christmas Eve fire that year

On Christmas Eve 1929, during Herbert Hoover's presidency, a fire began in the attic of the West Wing. It quickly grew, and according to the White House Historical Association it became the most powerful fire to hit the White House since the Burning of Washington in 1814. The fire was noticed at about 8:00 pm and quick action was taken to save objects and files in the building. George Akerson, among others, managed to save the Theodore Roosevelt desk, which was in use in the Oval Office.

Ike Hoover covered it with a tarpaulin to protect it from the freezing water being sprayed on the burning building. By 10:30 pm the fire was extinguished. The executive offices were heavily damaged, leaving the roof, attic, and floors heavily damaged and the press room of the West Wing completely ruined. Repairs to the building were completed on April 14, 1930, and President Hoover moved back into the newly constructed Oval Office.

With the opening of the newly repaired and renovated Oval Office, the Grand Rapids Furniture Manufacturers Association gave Hoover a 17-piece office suite, made by furniture makers from Grand Rapids, Michigan, to furnish the space. The Hoover Desk was the centerpiece of this office suite. Designed to give "the appearance of a well preserved suite of Colonial Furniture," the furniture was built by a variety of manufactures in Grand Rapids including the Robert W. Irwin Company, the Mueller Furniture Company, and the Grand Rapids Furniture Company.

According to an article in the Grand Rapids Spectator, in addition to the desk the full set consists of a "davenport, a club chair, two large and one smaller wing chairs, two tables, a swivel desk chair, two armchairs, two bookcases, a small table and three smoking stands of two sizes." Preliminary sketches of the designs for all the furniture pieces were submitted to President Hoover and his wife Lou Henry Hoover for approval before construction on them began. The Hoovers selected the fabric that the chairs were upholstered in. All the pieces have uniform finishes and carry a common design language.

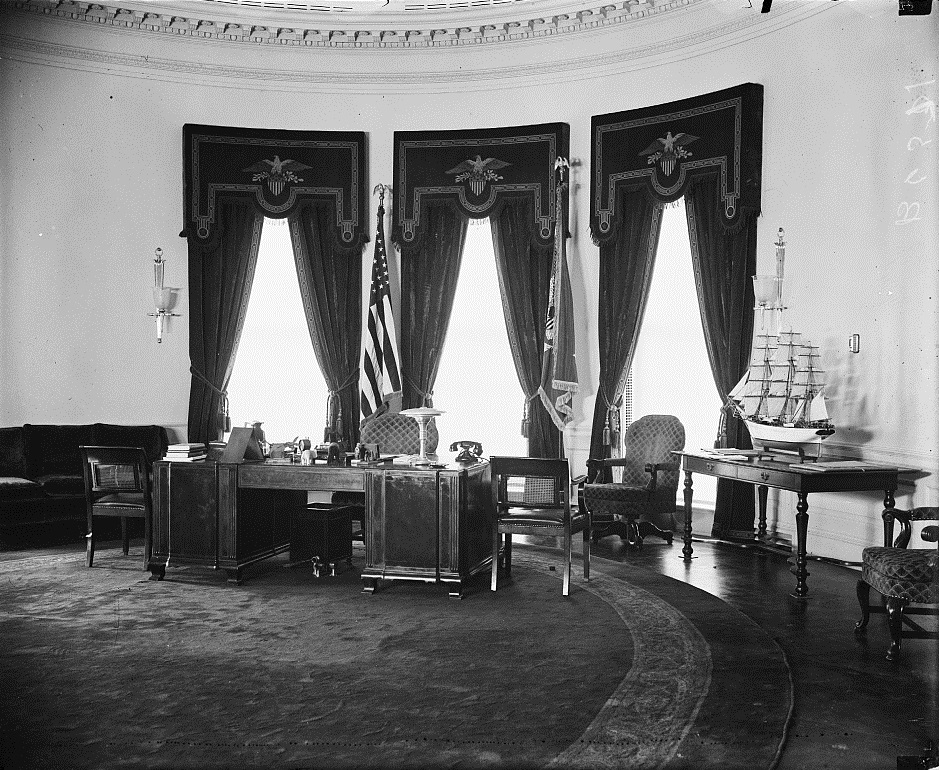
The Hoover desk in the newly built Franklin D. Roosevelt Oval Office, 1934

During Hoover's presidency a telephone was installed on the Hoover desk, the first to be installed in the Oval Office or on a president's desk. Hoover requested the phone just after taking office. Historian Nathan Miller explained in an article in the Smithsonian magazine that the phone was, "a highly symbolic gesture," and that it "made it clear that the new president intended to take command and control of the government; the lackadaisical Coolidge years were over."

When Franklin D. Roosevelt took office in 1933 after defeating Hoover, he decided to keep the same furnishings and furniture in the Oval Office as his predecessor. In 1934, Roosevelt had the West Wing of the White House enlarged under the direction of New York architect Eric Gugler. Part of this renovation included moving the Oval Office from its former location on axis with the front door of the building, to a new addition on the southeastern corner of the wing. On December 4, 1934, Roosevelt began working from the new offices for the first time, but the full renovation lasted into the beginning months of 1935. The Hoover desk was returned to the Oval Office, placed in front of gray-green painted walls and grand green curtains with eagle-adorned cornices.

During Roosevelt's 1940 reelection campaign, where he ran for an unprecedented third term, FDR had a taping system installed in the Oval Office for the purpose of recording press conferences. This system included an RCA made "continuous film soundtrack recording machine" located in a basement room directly under the Oval Office, and a microphone concealed within a lamp on the Hoover desk. Wires ran up through the floor of the Oval Office between the recording machine and microphone. While used exclusively for recording press conferences, a few conversation which took place immediately after were inadvertently caught on tape as well. After Roosevelt's reelection in 1940 the recording system was retired.

Display of the Hoover Desk at the FDR Library and Museum

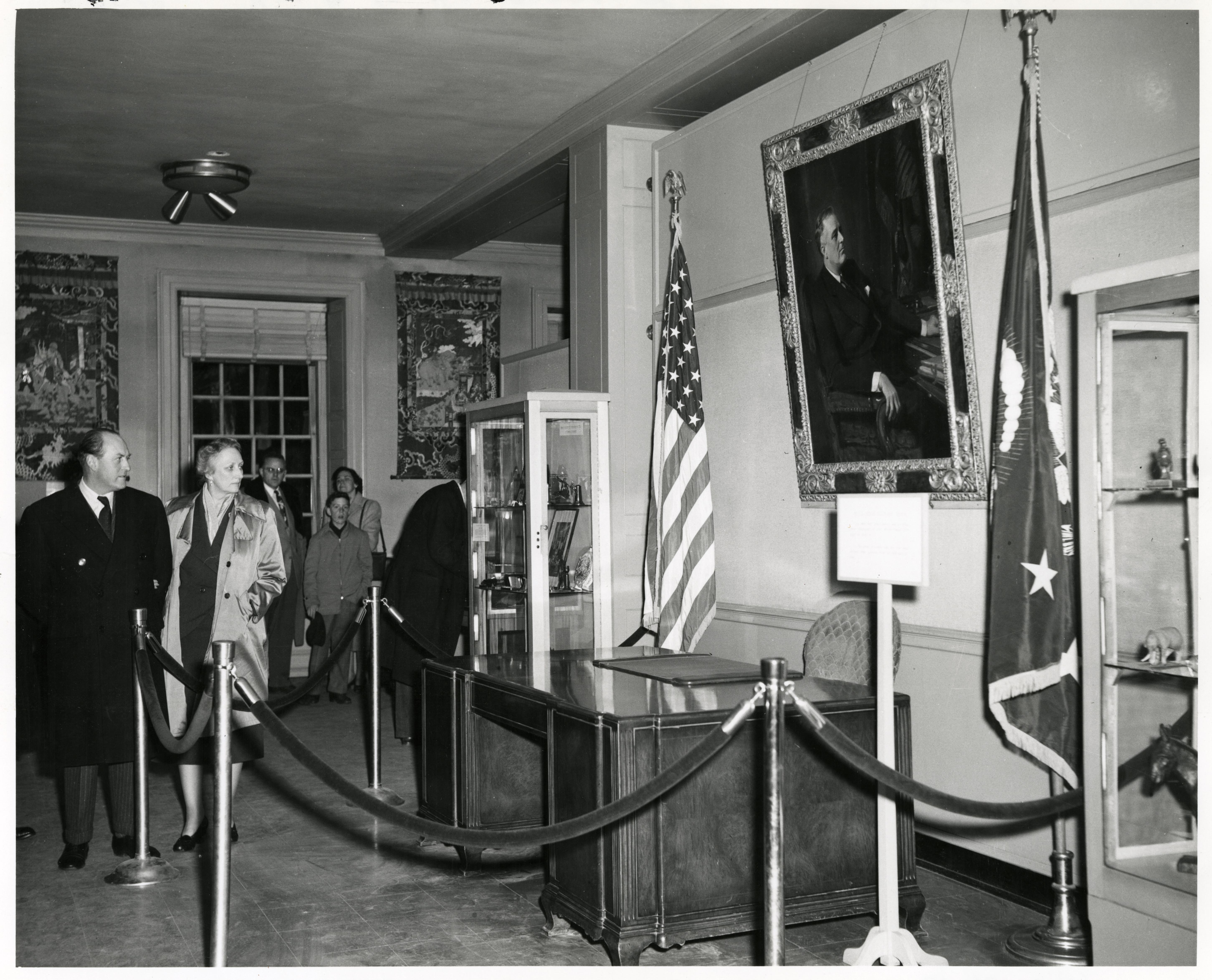
Then–Crown Prince Olav and Princess Märtha of Norway view the desk, 1950.

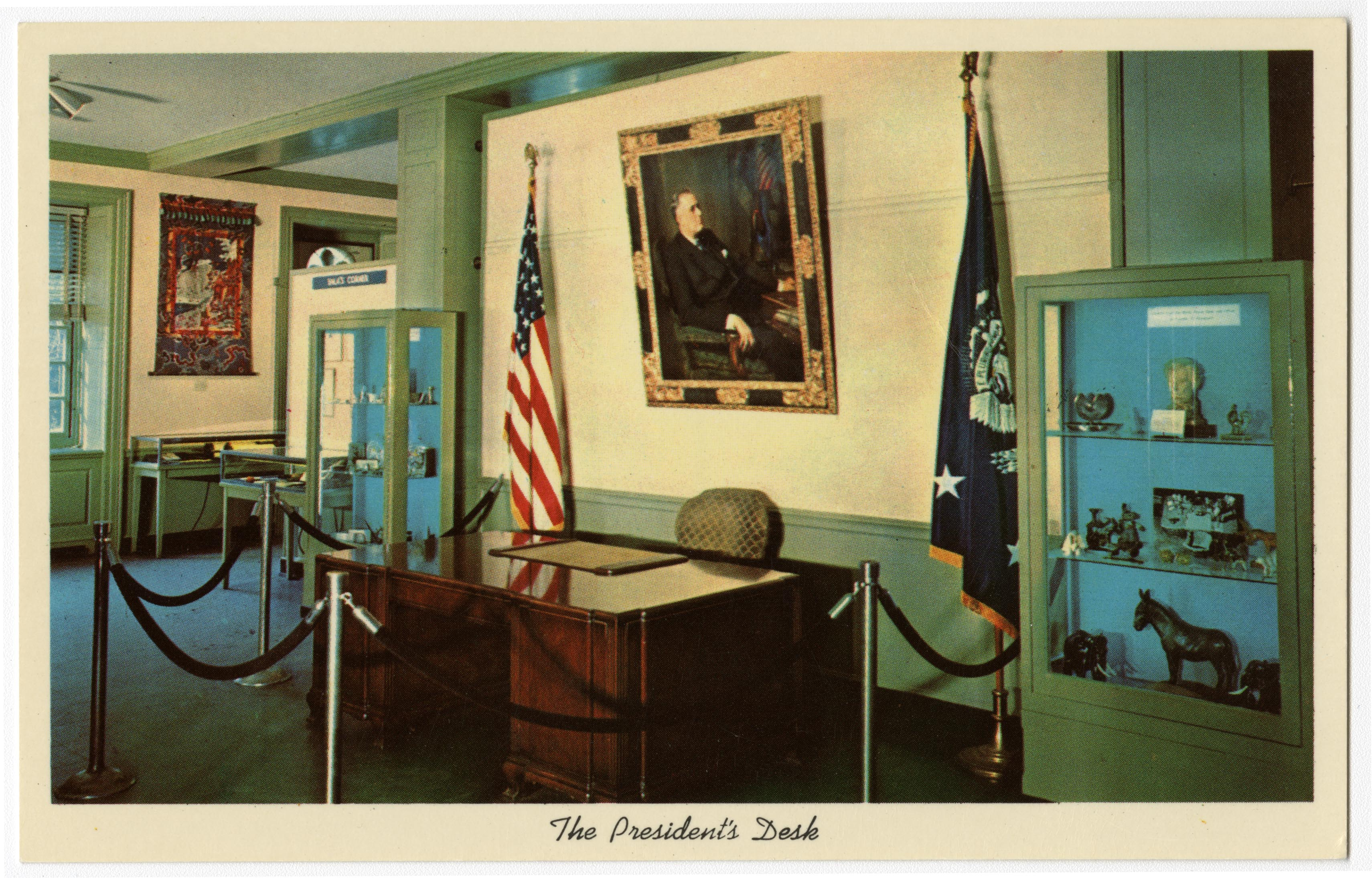
A postcard of the Hoover desk from 1968

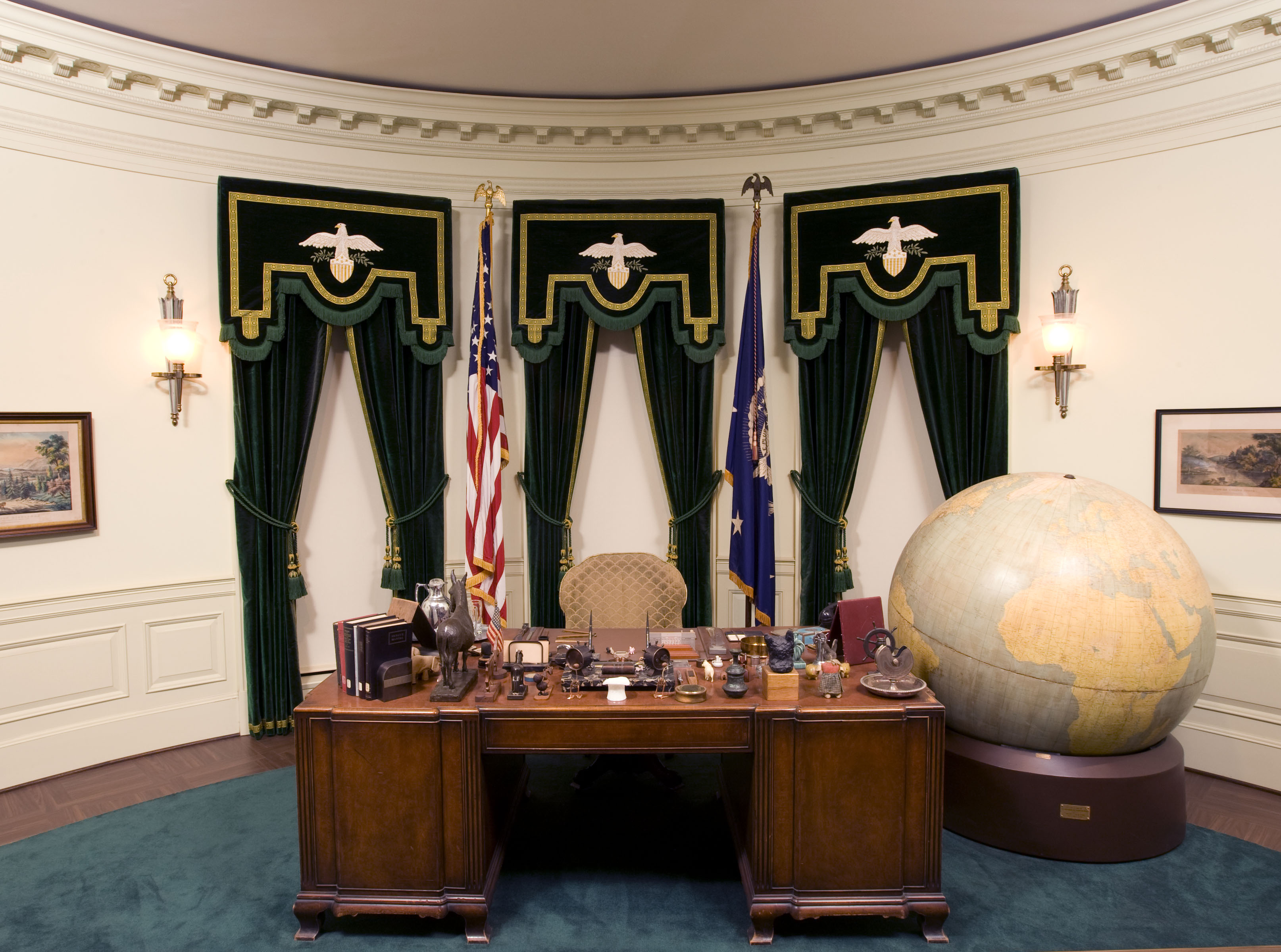
The Hoover desk in a recreation of Roosevelt's Oval Office, 2008

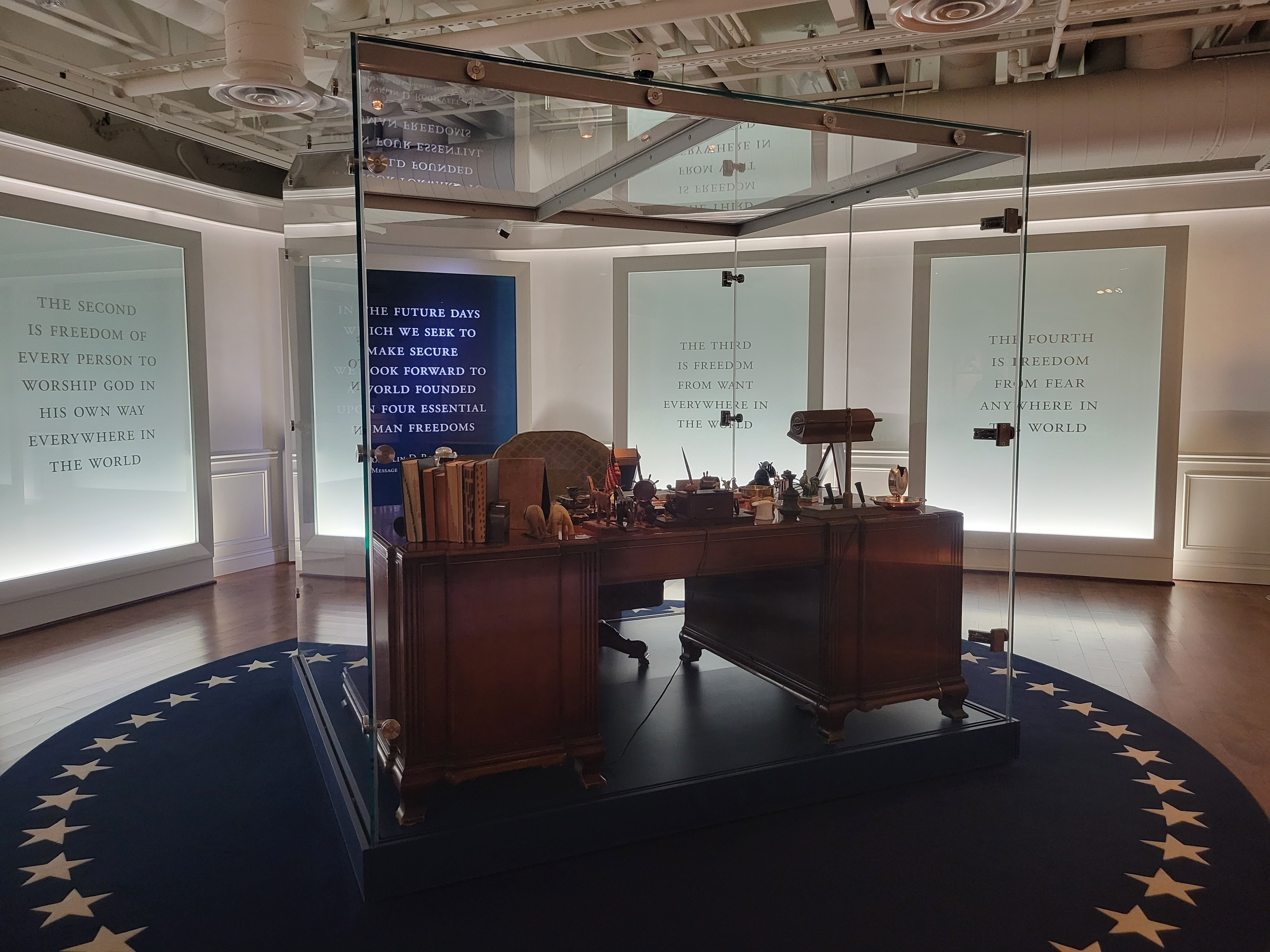
The Hoover desk in a large glass display case, 2022

During Roosevelt's 12 years as president he signed many landmark bills on the Hoover desk, including the act to create the Tennessee Valley Authority, the G.I. Bill, the declaration of war on Japan, and the declaration of war on Germany. During his presidency he gathered a collection of objects that he displayed on the desk.

Roosevelt died suddenly in 1945, leaving the role of president to his vice president, Harry S. Truman. On Truman's first day as president he cleared off the Hoover desk, had it removed from the Oval Office, and replaced it with the Theodore Roosevelt desk. Truman gave the Hoover desk, the office chair Roosevelt used at the desk, and the objects Roosevelt displayed on the desk to Roosevelt's wife, Eleanor Roosevelt. The desk and chair were presented to Mrs. Roosevelt and shipped up to her home in Hyde Park, New York.

In April 1945, Eleanor Roosevelt deposited the desk and chair in the Franklin D. Roosevelt Presidential Library and Museum in Hyde Park, and fully donated them on February 10, 1947. Both the desk and chair have been on display at the museum ever since. As of 2020, the Hoover desk, the chair Roosevelt used with it, and a selection of objects on the desk at the time of his death are on display in a glass vitrine at the library. The FDR Library and Museum is one of two presidential libraries displaying the desk the president used instead of a replica. The Lyndon Baines Johnson Library and Museum is the other, which displays the Johnson desk.

Valerie Biden Owens, the sister of president Joe Biden and a member of the team tasked with redecorating the Oval Office for Biden's tenure, states in her memoir Growing Up Biden, that the Hoover desk almost moved back to the Oval Office for Biden's presidency. She describes an attempt to remove every object Donald Trump "touched" from the Oval Office, even the Resolute desk, saying, "We tried to get FDR's Oval Office desk—I wanted everything Trump had touched out of there—but to this day, the desk resides at FDR's family home in Hyde Park. ... Thus, the desk Trump had sat behind remained."

== Timeline ==
Detail images of the Hoover desk

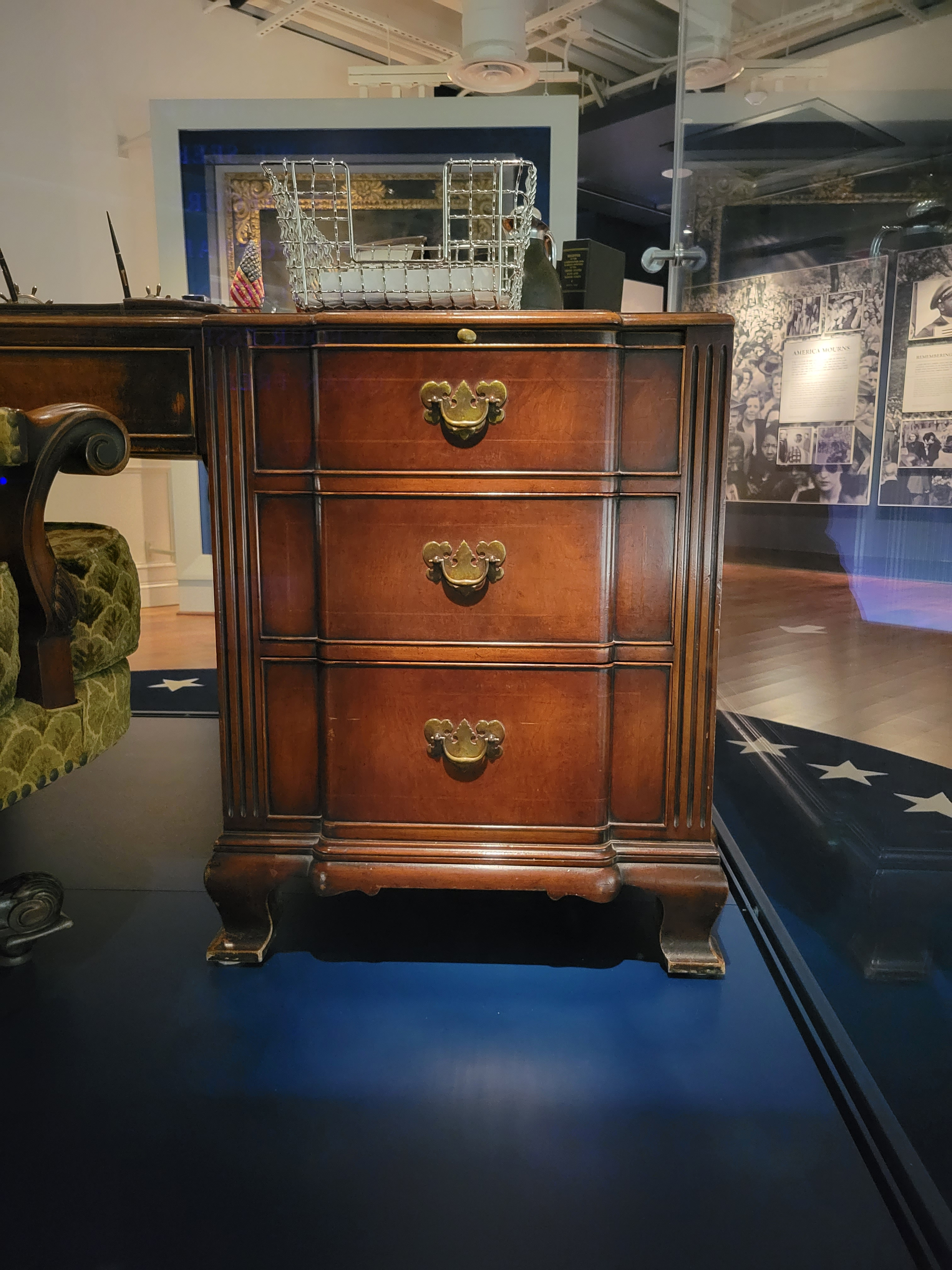
Drawer fronts

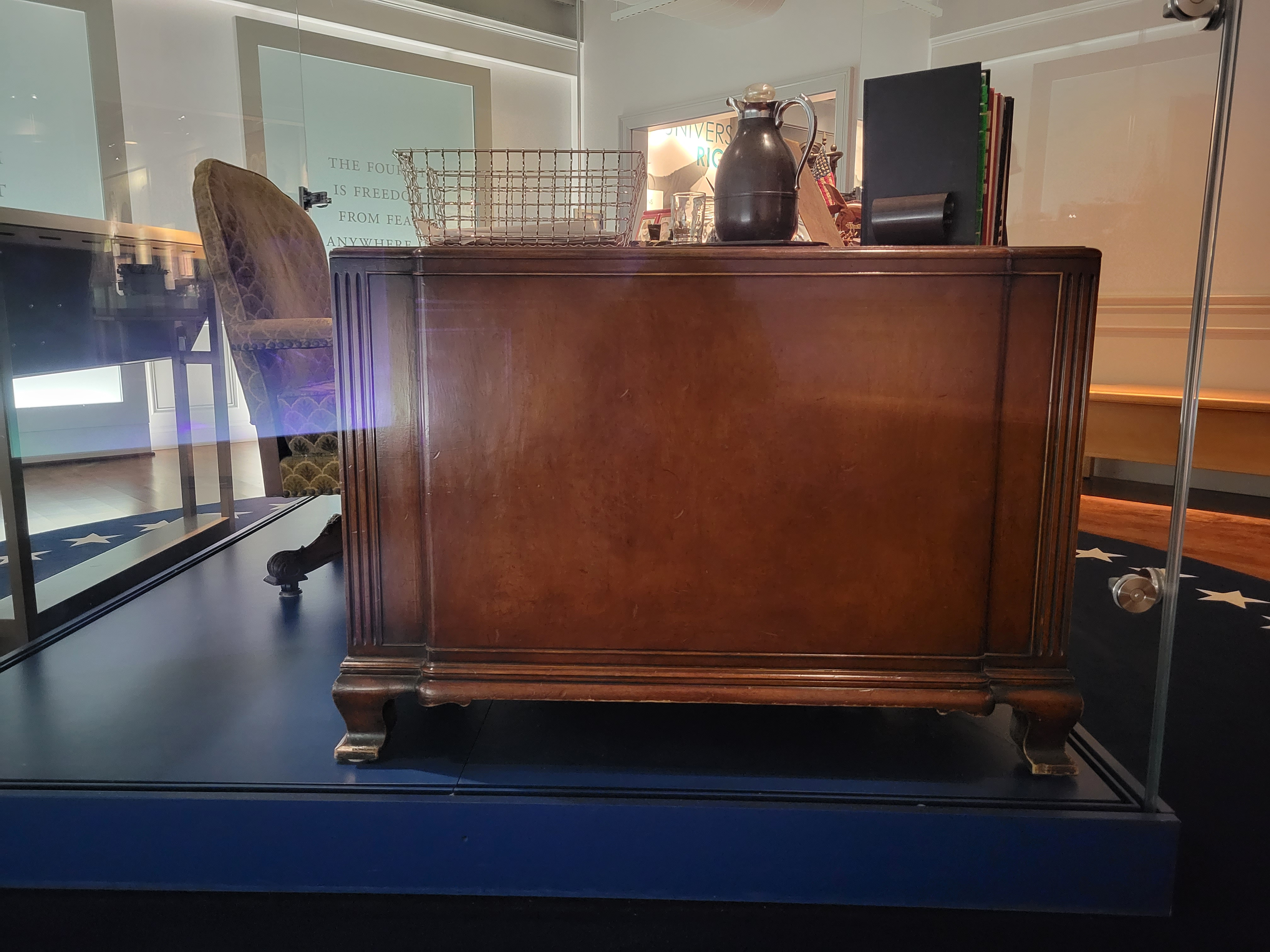
Side detail

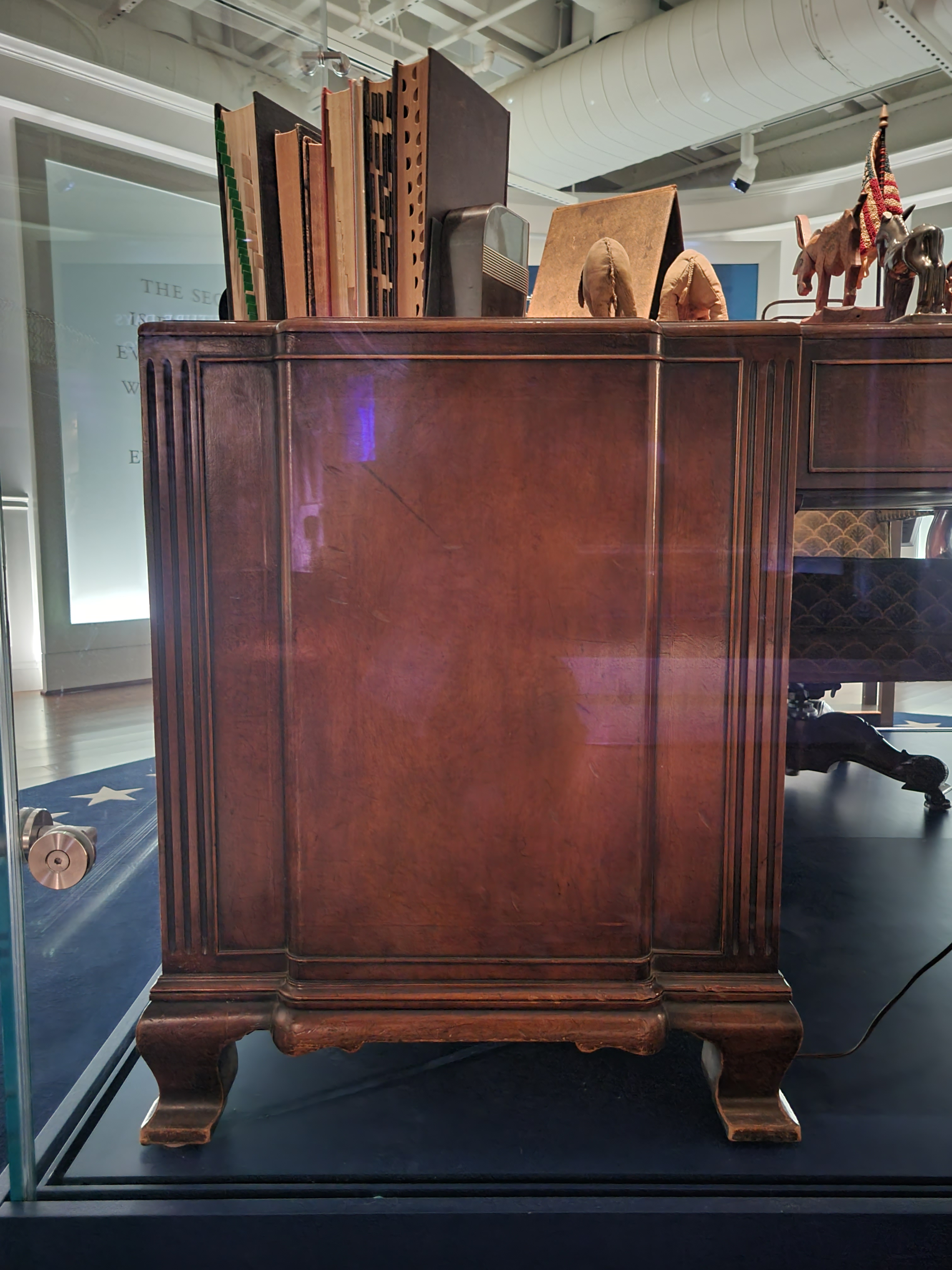
Back of pedestal

Below is a table with the location of the desk from when it was built in 1930 to the present day. Each tenant of the desk is shown.

A table with the location of the desk from when it was built in 1930 to the present day
Tenant	Location	Dates	Ref.
Herbert Hoover	Oval Office, White House	1930–1945	
Franklin D. Roosevelt	Oval Office, White House	1930–1945	
Franklin D. Roosevelt Presidential Library and Museum display		1945–present	
