= List of Oval Office desks =

External image
- George Washington desk

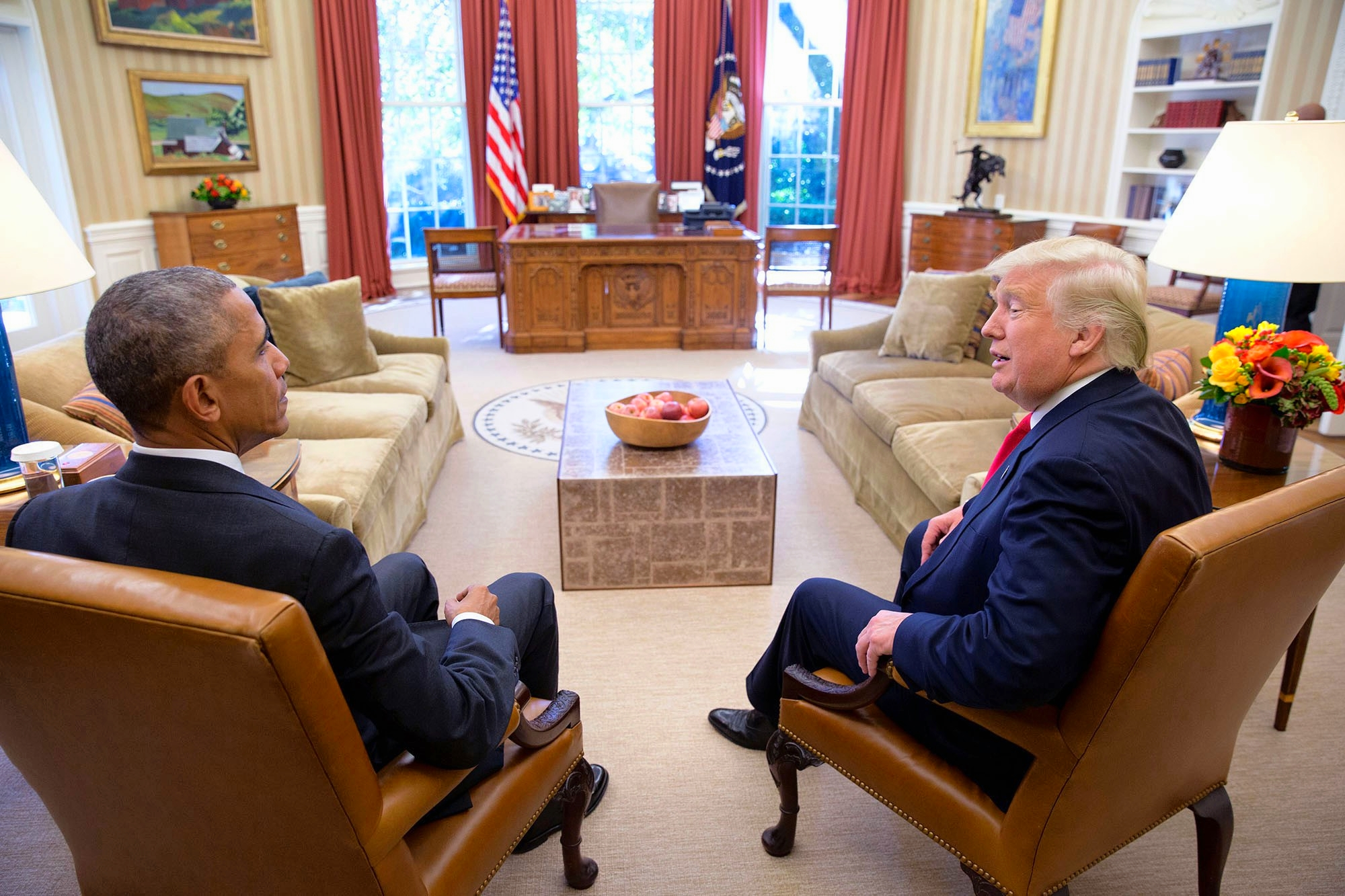
President Barack Obama and President-elect Donald Trump sitting in the Oval Office with the Resolute desk, the desk they both used, in the background

Since the construction of the Oval Office in 1909, there have been six different desks used in the office by the president of the United States. The desk usually sits in front of the south wall of the Oval Office. The desk has an executive chair behind and usually has chairs for advisors placed to either side or in front. Each president uses the Oval Office, and the desk in it, differently. The desk is widely used ceremonially for photo opportunities and press announcements. Some presidents, such as Richard Nixon, used the desk only for these ceremonial purposes, while others, including Dwight D. Eisenhower, used it as their main workspace.

The first desk used in the Oval Office was the Theodore Roosevelt desk. The desk currently in use by Donald Trump is the Resolute desk. Of the six desks that have occupied the Oval Office, the Resolute has spent the longest time in the room, having been used by eight presidents. The Resolute has been used by John F. Kennedy and by all U.S. presidents since 1977 with the exception of George H. W. Bush. Bush used the C&O desk for his one term, making it the shortest-serving desk to date. Other past presidents used the Hoover desk, the Johnson desk, and the Wilson desk.

The process for choosing a desk is not standardized and different presidents have chosen desks for different reasons. A few presidents have made public through interviews or papers in their presidential libraries how their choice was made. A 1974 memo explaining the desk options Gerald Ford could choose from is held at the Gerald R. Ford Presidential Library. Jimmy Carter wrote about choosing a desk as his first official presidential decision in his 1982 memoir Keeping Faith: Memoirs of a President. In an interview with Chris Wallace, Donald Trump described that there are seven desks to choose from and that he chose the Resolute desk due to its history and beauty. Joe Biden explained in a 2023 interview with Architectural Digest that there is a suburban Maryland facility with a replica Oval Office where interior decorators can test the placement of furnishings before they are moved into the actual Oval Office on Inauguration Day.

== History ==
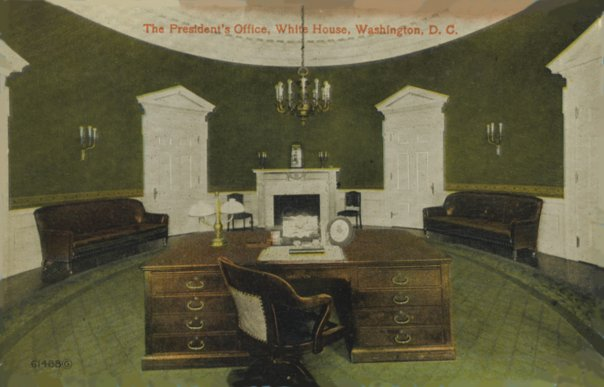
The Theodore Roosevelt desk in William Howard Taft's new Oval Office, 1909

The first Oval Office was constructed as part of the expansion of the West Wing to the White House in 1909 under President William Howard Taft. The room was designed by Nathan C. Wyeth. He chose the Theodore Roosevelt desk, designed by Charles Follen McKim and first used by President Theodore Roosevelt in the previous executive office, for the new office space. This desk remained in use by subsequent presidents until, on December 24, 1929, a fire severely damaged the West Wing during President Herbert Hoover's administration.

Hoover reconstructed the part of the White House affected, including the Oval Office, reopening them in 1930. With the repair, Hoover was gifted a suite of 17 furniture pieces including a new desk, known as the Hoover desk, by an association of Grand Rapids, Michigan furniture-makers. This new desk was used for the rest of Hoover's term in office and by Franklin D. Roosevelt for his presidency.

Roosevelt had the West Wing expanded during his time in office, including the construction of a new Oval Office. After Roosevelt died in office, the Hoover desk was given to his wife, Eleanor Roosevelt. In 1945, the Theodore Roosevelt desk was brought back to the newly rebuilt Oval Office by then President Harry S. Truman, and used by Dwight D. Eisenhower.

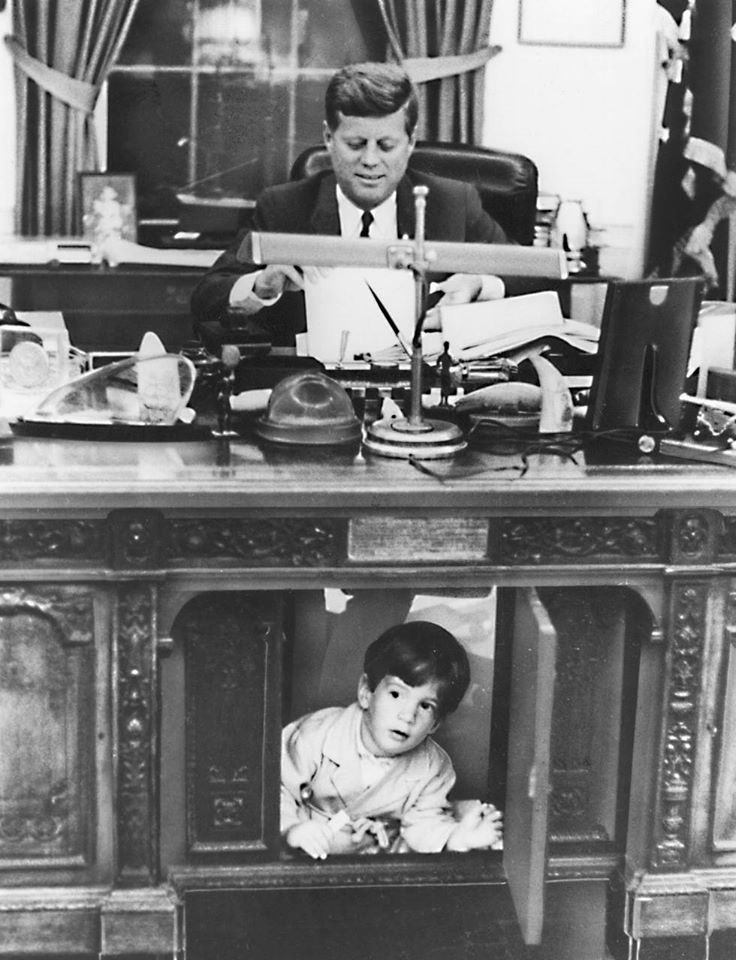
Stanley Tretick's October 2, 1963 photo of John F. Kennedy Jr. playing in the kneehole of the Resolute desk

John F. Kennedy briefly used the Theodore Roosevelt desk, before it was switched out in 1961 for the Resolute desk. Jacqueline Kennedy, John F. Kennedy's wife, thought the more ornately carved Resolute desk should be the most visible presidential desk.

Upon Kennedy's assassination in 1963, the Resolute desk was sent on a national tour. His successor Lyndon B. Johnson elected to use the desk he had used as a senator and as vice president. When Johnson left office, his desk was sent to his presidential library. When Richard Nixon became president, he brought the Wilson desk, which he had used as vice president. It remained in the Oval Office when Gerald Ford took over after Nixon's resignation.

In 1977, Jimmy Carter returned the Resolute desk to the Oval Office. The desk has since been used in that room by every president other than George H. W. Bush, who elected to use the C&O desk, which he had used as vice president. Doro Bush Koch, one of George Bush's children, suggests Bush's choice to use his vice presidential desk may have been due to a perceived tradition of vice presidents that ascend to the presidency using their vice presidential desks. The C&O Desk remained as part of the White House collection after Bush left office, according to Jay Patton, the supervisory curator of the George H.W. Bush Presidential Library and Museum.

Joe Biden, the next vice president to become president, did not follow this perceived tradition and continued using the Resolute desk. Biden would have preferred to use the Hoover desk previously used by Franklin Roosevelt, but it could not be relocated from Roosevelt's presidential library in Hyde Park, New York.

== Desks by president ==
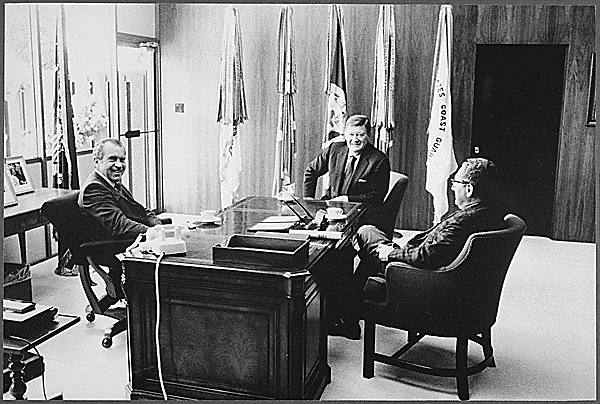
Below is a table noting each of the six desks ever used in the Oval Office, including the name they are most commonly known by, the presidents that used the desk, a description, and the desk's current location. (Note: President Richard Nixon, with Henry Kissinger and John Wayne, sitting at the unnamed mahogany desk in his office at La Casa Pacifica A seventh desk, not listed here, is also offered to presidents for use in the Oval Office but has never been used there. This unnamed, mahogany, double pedestal desk, has a brown leather top, three drawers in each pedestal, and three horizontal drawers in its top section. It was built in 1952, measures 72 by 36 inches (183 by 91 cm), and was gifted to the White House in 1952 by John McShain, the general contractor of the Truman reconstruction of the White House. Originally housed in the Second Floor Center Hall it was moved to La Casa Pacifica on July 24, 1969 where it remained through at least 1974. After President Nixon resigned, he asked to keep the desk for the remainder of his lifetime.)

Desk	Oval Office tenant	Workspace dimensions	Notes	Current location	Picture
Theodore Roosevelt desk	William Howard Taft	90 by 53.5 inches (229 by 136 cm)	This desk was created in 1903 for then President Theodore Roosevelt. It was first used in the Oval Office by William Howard Taft and remained there until the West Wing fire in 1929. It remained in storage until 1945 when Harry S. Truman placed it in the modern Oval Office. Richard Nixon used this desk in the Eisenhower Executive Office Building where Stephen Hess of the Brookings Institution presumes, "the Watergate tapes were made by an apparatus concealed in its drawer".	Vice President's Ceremonial Office, Eisenhower Executive Office Building, Washington, D.C.	The Theodore Roosevelt desk in the Truman Oval Office
Theodore Roosevelt desk	Woodrow Wilson	90 by 53.5 inches (229 by 136 cm)	This desk was created in 1903 for then President Theodore Roosevelt. It was first used in the Oval Office by William Howard Taft and remained there until the West Wing fire in 1929. It remained in storage until 1945 when Harry S. Truman placed it in the modern Oval Office. Richard Nixon used this desk in the Eisenhower Executive Office Building where Stephen Hess of the Brookings Institution presumes, "the Watergate tapes were made by an apparatus concealed in its drawer".	Vice President's Ceremonial Office, Eisenhower Executive Office Building, Washington, D.C.	The Theodore Roosevelt desk in the Truman Oval Office
Theodore Roosevelt desk	Warren G. Harding	90 by 53.5 inches (229 by 136 cm)	This desk was created in 1903 for then President Theodore Roosevelt. It was first used in the Oval Office by William Howard Taft and remained there until the West Wing fire in 1929. It remained in storage until 1945 when Harry S. Truman placed it in the modern Oval Office. Richard Nixon used this desk in the Eisenhower Executive Office Building where Stephen Hess of the Brookings Institution presumes, "the Watergate tapes were made by an apparatus concealed in its drawer".	Vice President's Ceremonial Office, Eisenhower Executive Office Building, Washington, D.C.	The Theodore Roosevelt desk in the Truman Oval Office
Theodore Roosevelt desk	Calvin Coolidge	90 by 53.5 inches (229 by 136 cm)	This desk was created in 1903 for then President Theodore Roosevelt. It was first used in the Oval Office by William Howard Taft and remained there until the West Wing fire in 1929. It remained in storage until 1945 when Harry S. Truman placed it in the modern Oval Office. Richard Nixon used this desk in the Eisenhower Executive Office Building where Stephen Hess of the Brookings Institution presumes, "the Watergate tapes were made by an apparatus concealed in its drawer".	Vice President's Ceremonial Office, Eisenhower Executive Office Building, Washington, D.C.	The Theodore Roosevelt desk in the Truman Oval Office
Theodore Roosevelt desk	Herbert Hoover (Note: Herbert Hoover used the Theodore Roosevelt desk until the 1929 West Wing fire. After the reconstruction of the Oval Office he switched to the Hoover desk.)	90 by 53.5 inches (229 by 136 cm)	This desk was created in 1903 for then President Theodore Roosevelt. It was first used in the Oval Office by William Howard Taft and remained there until the West Wing fire in 1929. It remained in storage until 1945 when Harry S. Truman placed it in the modern Oval Office. Richard Nixon used this desk in the Eisenhower Executive Office Building where Stephen Hess of the Brookings Institution presumes, "the Watergate tapes were made by an apparatus concealed in its drawer".	Vice President's Ceremonial Office, Eisenhower Executive Office Building, Washington, D.C.	The Theodore Roosevelt desk in the Truman Oval Office
Theodore Roosevelt desk	Harry S. Truman	90 by 53.5 inches (229 by 136 cm)	This desk was created in 1903 for then President Theodore Roosevelt. It was first used in the Oval Office by William Howard Taft and remained there until the West Wing fire in 1929. It remained in storage until 1945 when Harry S. Truman placed it in the modern Oval Office. Richard Nixon used this desk in the Eisenhower Executive Office Building where Stephen Hess of the Brookings Institution presumes, "the Watergate tapes were made by an apparatus concealed in its drawer".	Vice President's Ceremonial Office, Eisenhower Executive Office Building, Washington, D.C.	The Theodore Roosevelt desk in the Truman Oval Office
Theodore Roosevelt desk	Dwight D. Eisenhower	90 by 53.5 inches (229 by 136 cm)	This desk was created in 1903 for then President Theodore Roosevelt. It was first used in the Oval Office by William Howard Taft and remained there until the West Wing fire in 1929. It remained in storage until 1945 when Harry S. Truman placed it in the modern Oval Office. Richard Nixon used this desk in the Eisenhower Executive Office Building where Stephen Hess of the Brookings Institution presumes, "the Watergate tapes were made by an apparatus concealed in its drawer".	Vice President's Ceremonial Office, Eisenhower Executive Office Building, Washington, D.C.	The Theodore Roosevelt desk in the Truman Oval Office
Hoover desk	Herbert Hoover	82.5 by 45.5 inches (210 by 116 cm)	A December 24, 1929 fire severely damaged the West Wing, including the Oval Office. President Herbert Hoover accepted the donation of a new desk from a group of Grand Rapids, Michigan, furniture-makers and used it as his Oval Office desk after the new office was completed.	Franklin D. Roosevelt Presidential Library and Museum, Hyde Park, New York	Franklin D. Roosevelt seated at the Hoover Desk
Hoover desk	Franklin D. Roosevelt	82.5 by 45.5 inches (210 by 116 cm)	A December 24, 1929 fire severely damaged the West Wing, including the Oval Office. President Herbert Hoover accepted the donation of a new desk from a group of Grand Rapids, Michigan, furniture-makers and used it as his Oval Office desk after the new office was completed.	Franklin D. Roosevelt Presidential Library and Museum, Hyde Park, New York	Franklin D. Roosevelt seated at the Hoover Desk
Resolute desk	John F. Kennedy	72 by 48 inches (180 by 120 cm)	This desk was created from wood salvaged from HMS Resolute and given to President Rutherford B. Hayes by Queen Victoria in 1879. It had a hinged front panel added to it by Franklin D. Roosevelt. The desk resided in the White House in various rooms, until Jacqueline Kennedy found it languishing in the "White House broadcast room". She had it restored and moved into the Oval Office. After Kennedy's death, the desk was removed for a traveling exhibition, returning to the Oval Office under Jimmy Carter in 1977. It has been the Oval Office desk ever since with the exception of the George H.W. Bush presidential years.	Oval Office, The White House, Washington, D.C.	Barack Obama sitting at the ornate Resolute desk in 2009
Resolute desk	Jimmy Carter	72 by 48 inches (180 by 120 cm)		Oval Office, The White House, Washington, D.C.	Barack Obama sitting at the ornate Resolute desk in 2009
Resolute desk	Ronald Reagan	72 by 48 inches (180 by 120 cm)		Oval Office, The White House, Washington, D.C.	Barack Obama sitting at the ornate Resolute desk in 2009
Resolute desk	Bill Clinton	72 by 48 inches (180 by 120 cm)		Oval Office, The White House, Washington, D.C.	Barack Obama sitting at the ornate Resolute desk in 2009
Resolute desk	George W. Bush	72 by 48 inches (180 by 120 cm)		Oval Office, The White House, Washington, D.C.	Barack Obama sitting at the ornate Resolute desk in 2009
Resolute desk	Barack Obama	72 by 48 inches (180 by 120 cm)		Oval Office, The White House, Washington, D.C.	Barack Obama sitting at the ornate Resolute desk in 2009
Resolute desk	Donald Trump	72 by 48 inches (180 by 120 cm)		Oval Office, The White House, Washington, D.C.	Barack Obama sitting at the ornate Resolute desk in 2009
Resolute desk	Joe Biden	72 by 48 inches (180 by 120 cm)		Oval Office, The White House, Washington, D.C.	Barack Obama sitting at the ornate Resolute desk in 2009
Johnson desk	Lyndon B. Johnson	75.5 by 45.5 inches (192 by 116 cm)	This desk was used by Johnson from the time he was in the United States Senate up through his tenure in the Oval Office.	Lyndon Baines Johnson Library and Museum, Austin, Texas	Lyndon Baines Johnson seated at the Johnson desk, 1968.
Wilson desk	Richard Nixon	80.75 by 58.25 inches (205.1 by 148.0 cm)	Nixon used this desk both as vice president and president, because he believed that it had been used by President Woodrow Wilson. Actually, the desk had not been used by Woodrow Wilson or by Vice President Henry Wilson.	Vice President's Room, United States Capitol, Washington, D.C.	Gerald Ford and George Meany at the Wilson Desk, 1974.
Wilson desk	Gerald Ford	80.75 by 58.25 inches (205.1 by 148.0 cm)	Nixon used this desk both as vice president and president, because he believed that it had been used by President Woodrow Wilson. Actually, the desk had not been used by Woodrow Wilson or by Vice President Henry Wilson.	Vice President's Room, United States Capitol, Washington, D.C.	Gerald Ford and George Meany at the Wilson Desk, 1974.
C&O desk	George H. W. Bush	Unknown	George H. W. Bush used this desk during his tenure as both vice president and president of the United States. It was created for the owners of the Chesapeake and Ohio Railway around 1920 and subsequently donated to the White House. Previously, Presidents Gerald Ford, Jimmy Carter, and Ronald Reagan had used it in the West Wing Study.	White House collection	The C&O desk in the Oval Office during George Bush's presidency

=== Chronology ===
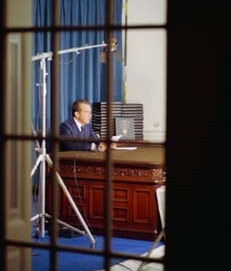
President Richard Nixon at the Wilson desk giving a televised address explaining release of edited transcripts of the Watergate tapes on April 29, 1974

Below is a table of desks used for each presidency since the Oval Office was created in 1909.

Chronology of Oval Office desks
Presidency	President	Desk
27	William Howard Taft	Theodore Roosevelt desk
28	Woodrow Wilson	Theodore Roosevelt desk
29	Warren G. Harding	Theodore Roosevelt desk
30	Calvin Coolidge	Theodore Roosevelt desk
31	Herbert Hoover	Theodore Roosevelt desk
31	Herbert Hoover	Hoover desk
32	Franklin D. Roosevelt	Hoover desk
33	Harry S. Truman	Theodore Roosevelt desk
34	Dwight D. Eisenhower	Theodore Roosevelt desk
35	John F. Kennedy	Resolute desk
36	Lyndon B. Johnson	Johnson desk
37	Richard Nixon	Wilson desk
38	Gerald Ford	Wilson desk
39	Jimmy Carter	Resolute desk
40	Ronald Reagan	Resolute desk
41	George H. W. Bush	C&O desk
42	Bill Clinton	Resolute desk
43	George W. Bush	Resolute desk
44	Barack Obama	Resolute desk
45/47	Donald Trump	Resolute desk
46	Joe Biden	Resolute desk

== Pre-Oval Office executive desks ==
The executive office of the president of the United States has moved multiple times before the Oval Office was created in 1909. George Washington first worked from Federal Hall, in New York City, following his inauguration in 1789. In 1790, Washington moved with the federal government to Philadelphia, where he worked out of a second floor office in President's House, the executive mansion at the time. Washington called this room his "study", Abigail Adams called it the "President's Room", and John Adams called it his "cabinet".

John Adams continued using President's House in the same way to 1800, when he moved into the White House in Washington, D.C. where he kept a small office next to his bedroom. Early space usage in the White House is hazy, but Thomas Jefferson kept an office in what is now the State Dining Room. An inventory of the White House shows that James Monroe had a room on the second floor with a desk, but it was not strictly used as an office. Every president from John Quincy Adams to William McKinley used a suite of rooms, centering on what is now known as the Lincoln Bedroom as their office.

Several notable desks were used by presidents in these executive offices. The following table lists these furniture pieces.

Desk	Presidential tenant(s)	Notes	Current location	Picture
Washington's writing desk	George Washington	Used by Washington in Federal Hall. After Federal Hall was demolished in 1812, the desk found its way to Bellevue Almshouse. This "horrified" the City Council who had it moved to the Governor's Room in 1844 where it has remained since.	Governor's Room, New York City Hall, New York	Washington's writing desk in the Governor's room at New York City Hall
Washington's presidential desk	George Washington	Used by Washington in his office in the President's House, the executive mansion at the time. This desk is now in the collection of the Philadelphia History Museum, which has been closed to the public since 2018.	Philadelphia History Museum, Philadelphia, Pennsylvania	
Declaration of Independence Desk	Thomas Jefferson	This portable desk made by Benjamin Randolph was used by Thomas Jefferson as he wrote the United States Declaration of Independence. Jefferson continued to use this desk through his time as president.	American Democracy exhibition, National Museum of American History, Washington, D.C.	the Declaration of Independence desk with its drawer open on a white background
Monroe Doctrine desk	James Monroe	All of the White House's furniture was destroyed during the 1814 Burning of Washington. When Monroe moved into the rebuilt presidential mansion he brought many of his own personal furnishings to use in the building. This fall-front desk is one of several pieces of furniture purchased by Monroe when he was in France between 1794 and 1796. While there are no documents proving this, family legend holds that the president wrote the Monroe Doctrine sitting at this desk. A secret compartment within the desk containing correspondences was discovered in the early 20th century. First Lady Lou Henry Hoover saw the desk in the 1930s and was so taken with the desk she had a replica created and placed in the White House.	James Monroe Museum and Memorial Library, Fredericksburg, Virginia	External image: The Monroe Doctrine desk
Desk in the room east of the upstairs oval room	John Quincy Adams	John Quincy Adams had an inventory made of the White House after he became president. This inventory notes a desk in the room east of the upstairs oval room which is assumed to be where his office was.		
Andrew Jackson's stand-up desk (Note: Several additional presidents are noted to have used an old stand-up desk, but sources do not explicitly name these desks as the same one Andrew Jackson used. William Seale notes in The President's House that James Buchanan had in his office "a plain stand-up desk of the kind clerks used, with pigeonholes". The White House Historical Association explains that Abraham Lincoln had a battered "upright mahogany desk" with pigeonholes placed in front of a doorway in his office. According to Real Life at the White House by John and Claire Whitcomb, Andrew Johnson also had a high desk in his office.)	Andrew Jackson	"A tall awkward desk" with pigeonholes was used by Andrew Jackson in the White House. During the rearrangement of the presidential office rooms in 1865, following the assassination of Abraham Lincoln, the desk was removed from the building and sent off to auction. Andrew Johnson ordered it be returned saying "What ever was Old Hickory's I revere". The desk was still in use in the presidential office during Rutherford B. Hayes's term. It was auctioned off in 1882 with other White House furnishings, under Chester A. Arthur's watch, to make way for new design elements in the building.		
Andrew Jackson's stand-up desk	Franklin Pierce			
Andrew Jackson's stand-up desk	Rutherford B. Hayes			
Buchanan’s Teakwood Desk	James Buchanan	This intricately carved pedestal desk was given to Buchanan, upon winning the presidential nomination in 1856, from friends that lived in India he had met while he was Minister to Russia in the 1830s. Buchanan had the desk shipped to the White House so it would be there when he arrived on his first day as President.	Sitting Room, Wheatland, Lancaster, Pennsylvania	Buchanan's Teakwood Desk
Table	Abraham Lincoln	Lincoln's office was located in the southeastern upstairs corner of the White House. While a large "council table" was the centerpiece of the room, a second table was located at the southern end which Lincoln used as his desk.		Lincoln seated at the table he uses as a desk
Patent Revolving Secretary	Ulysses S. Grant	Julia Dent Grant, unhappy with the furnishings of the White House, received a $25,000 (equivalent to $604,688 in 2025) appropriation from congress to update the interiors. While redecorating the cabinet room she purchased a "Patent Revolving Secretary", from Pottier & Stymus. This secretary was a patent Wooton desk with a carved eagle and shield on its cornice. The secretary was later sold to Webb Hayes for $10 who used it when he was the personal secretary to his father, Rutherford B. Hayes. In 1969, the secretary was back in the White House collection and was loaned to the Smithsonian.	White House collection	black and white image of the Patent Revolving Secretary
Resolute desk	Rutherford B. Hayes	After receiving the desk in 1880, Hayes placed it in the Green Room on exhibition until it was taken upstairs to his office on the second floor. Grover Cleveland used the desk in his office and library in what is now the Yellow Oval Room for both of his non-consecutive terms. William McKinley used the desk often in the Presidential Office and had a bouquet of flowers placed upon it every day. Theodore Roosevelt used it in the President's Room, today's Lincoln Bedroom.	Oval Office, The White House, Washington, D.C.	A black and white image of a group of men surrounding the Resolute desk, which had a large bouquet of flowers on it, as Jules Cambon signs the treaty on the desk.
Resolute desk	Grover Cleveland	After receiving the desk in 1880, Hayes placed it in the Green Room on exhibition until it was taken upstairs to his office on the second floor. Grover Cleveland used the desk in his office and library in what is now the Yellow Oval Room for both of his non-consecutive terms. William McKinley used the desk often in the Presidential Office and had a bouquet of flowers placed upon it every day. Theodore Roosevelt used it in the President's Room, today's Lincoln Bedroom.	Oval Office, The White House, Washington, D.C.	A black and white image of a group of men surrounding the Resolute desk, which had a large bouquet of flowers on it, as Jules Cambon signs the treaty on the desk.
Resolute desk	William McKinley	After receiving the desk in 1880, Hayes placed it in the Green Room on exhibition until it was taken upstairs to his office on the second floor. Grover Cleveland used the desk in his office and library in what is now the Yellow Oval Room for both of his non-consecutive terms. William McKinley used the desk often in the Presidential Office and had a bouquet of flowers placed upon it every day. Theodore Roosevelt used it in the President's Room, today's Lincoln Bedroom.	Oval Office, The White House, Washington, D.C.	A black and white image of a group of men surrounding the Resolute desk, which had a large bouquet of flowers on it, as Jules Cambon signs the treaty on the desk.
Resolute desk	Theodore Roosevelt	After receiving the desk in 1880, Hayes placed it in the Green Room on exhibition until it was taken upstairs to his office on the second floor. Grover Cleveland used the desk in his office and library in what is now the Yellow Oval Room for both of his non-consecutive terms. William McKinley used the desk often in the Presidential Office and had a bouquet of flowers placed upon it every day. Theodore Roosevelt used it in the President's Room, today's Lincoln Bedroom.	Oval Office, The White House, Washington, D.C.	A black and white image of a group of men surrounding the Resolute desk, which had a large bouquet of flowers on it, as Jules Cambon signs the treaty on the desk.
Secretary desk	Chester A. Arthur	The design of the White House was not to Arthur's taste. He had unfashionable and damaged furniture removed, selling off twenty-four wagon loads of furniture and thirty barrels of china. He commissioned Associated Artists, where Louis Comfort Tiffany was a partner, to redesign several rooms. The White House Historical Association claims no furniture was commissioned at this time, but an 1881 news article in the Richmond Item noted that a new desk had been created for the president. An 1882 ad notes this desk is a Wooton Desk in the secretary style, in use by President Arthur, and includes a quote from colonel Almon F. Rockwell, noting a carved coronet in the top guard.		Etching of the desk Chester A Arthur used in the White House
