= Theodore Roosevelt desk =

Oval Office desk

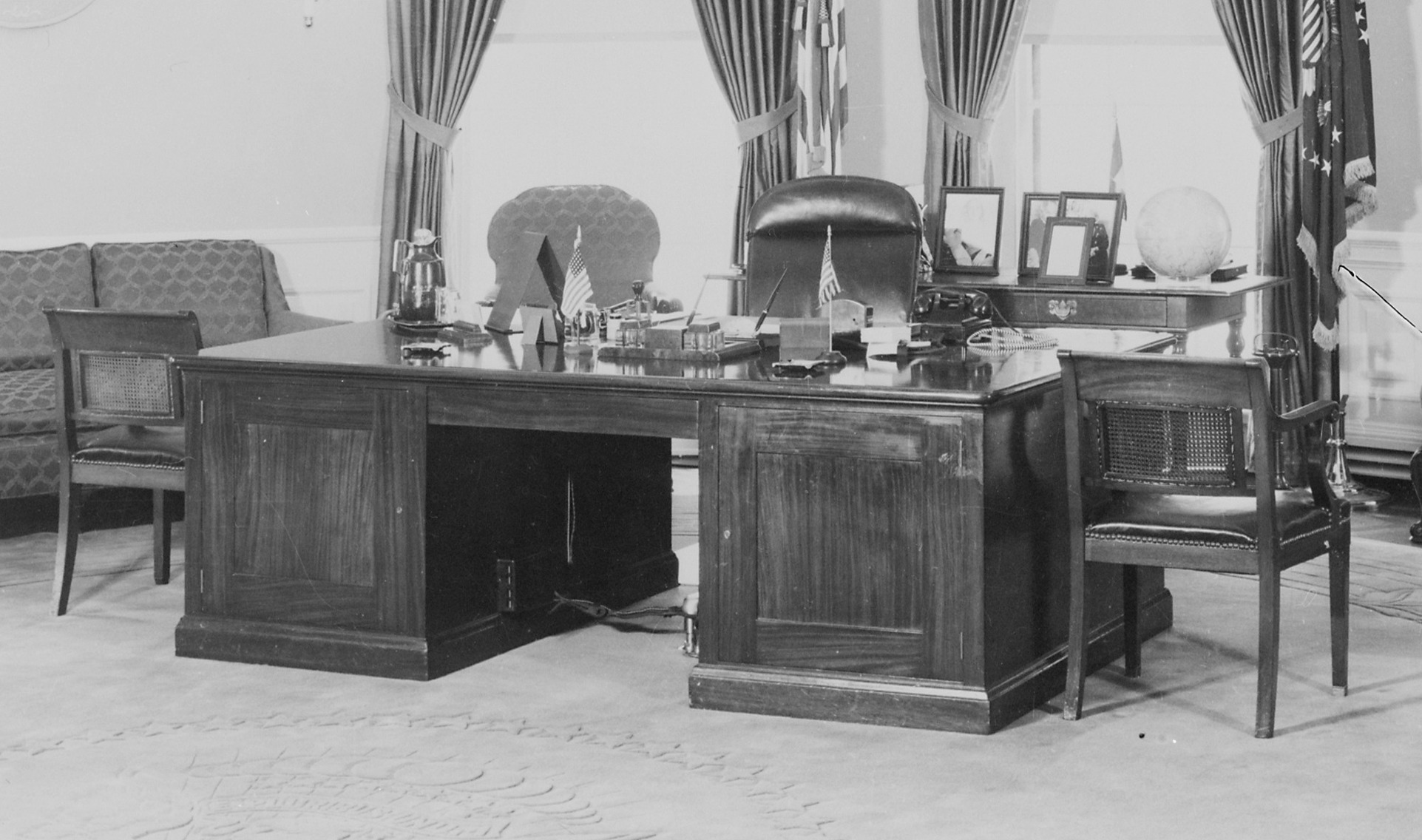
- The Theodore Roosevelt desk in the Oval office during Harry S. Truman's presidency
- Designer: Charles Follen McKim
- Date: 1903
- Made in: Boston, Massachusetts, by A. H. Davenport and Company
- Materials: Mahogany
- Style / tradition: Colonial Revival
- Height: 30 in (76 cm)
- Width: 90 in (230 cm)
- Depth: 53.5 in (136 cm)

The desk in the Vice President's Ceremonial Office in the Eisenhower Executive Office Building, colloquially known as the Theodore Roosevelt desk, is a large mahogany pedestal desk in the collection of the White House. It is the first of six desks that have been used by U.S. presidents in the Oval Office. Since 1961, it has been used as the desk of the U.S. Vice President.

In 1903, the desk was made to a design by Charles Follen McKim for the newly constructed West Wing, then called the Executive Office Building, one of several pieces of furniture made specifically for the new interior spaces. In 1929, the desk survived a major fire in the West Wing and was placed in storage for over a decade. The desk was replaced by the Hoover desk in the Oval Office until after Franklin D. Roosevelt's death. The next two presidents, Harry S. Truman and Dwight D. Eisenhower, returned the Theodore Roosevelt desk to the Oval Office.

After briefly using this desk in the Oval Office, John F. Kennedy switched to the Resolute desk and moved the Theodore Roosevelt desk to the Vice President's Ceremonial Office. Richard Nixon used this desk in his "working office" in the Eisenhower Executive Office Building, where some of the Watergate tapes were recorded by microphones attached to it. After Nixon resigned, the desk was moved back to the Vice President's Ceremonial Office, where it has been used by every Vice President since. Many of past users of the desk have signed their names on the bottom of the center drawer.

== Design and markings ==
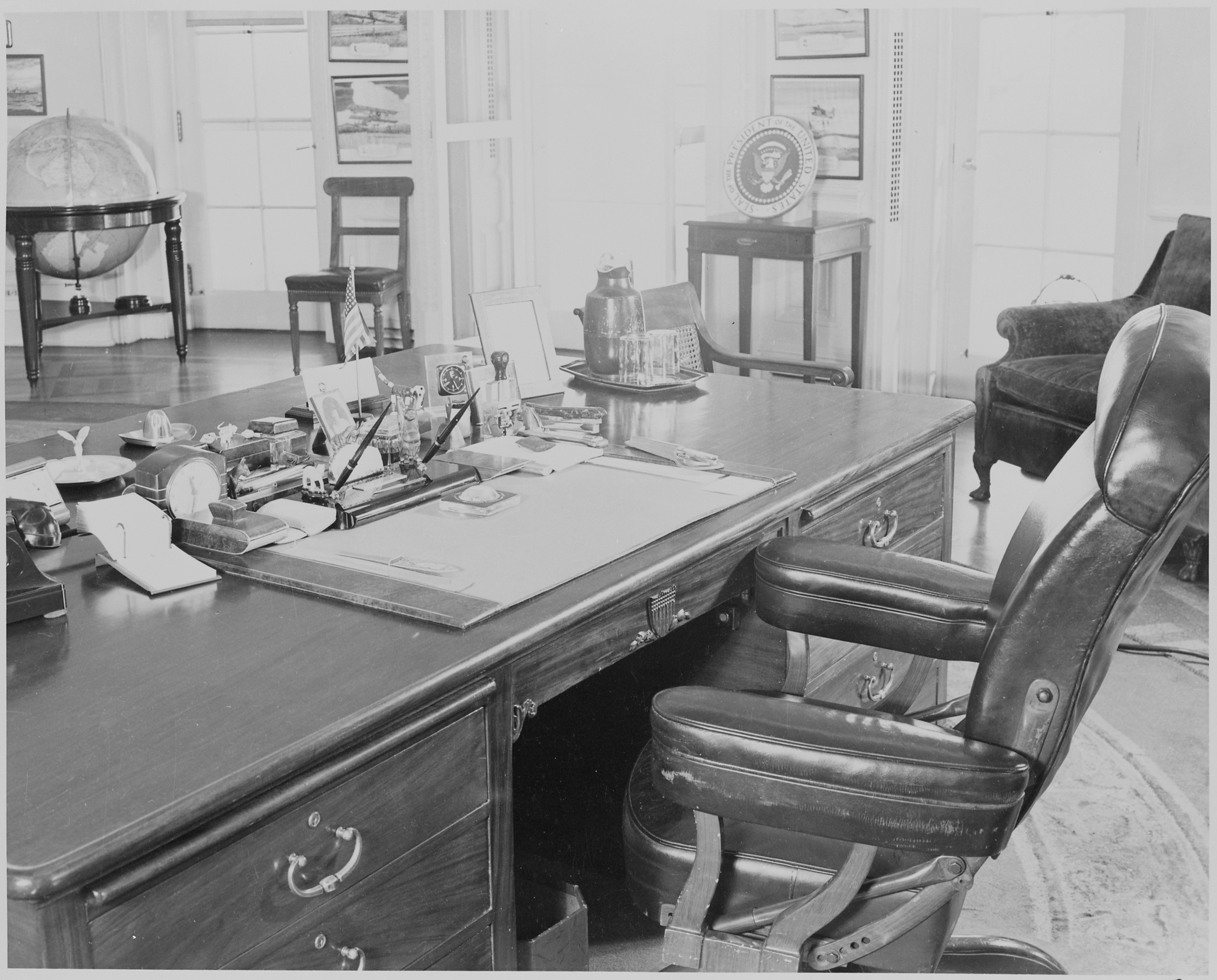
The back of the Theodore Roosevelt desk during the Truman administration, 1946

The Theodore Roosevelt desk is a mahogany pedestal desk and is owned by the White House. The 30 in (76 cm) high desk has a workspace which measures 90 in (230 cm) wide and 53.5 in (136 cm) deep. The understated design is marked by elegant and masculine lines and is detailed with brass pulls. There are two alterations to the desk that both took place during the Nixon administration. A hole was drilled in the top so phone cords could be threaded through the desk out of sight, and a lock was placed on the left hand drawer to secure a recording device located there. The desk was described in a 1949 article in Parade Magazine as being "time-worn, fire-scarred, [and] repainted".

Beginning in the 1940s, each user of the desk signed the interior of the center drawer at the end of their term in office. In 1974, it was noted in a memo that the signatures of Truman, Eisenhower, and Johnson, as well as Truman and Eisenhower's initials, were located in this drawer. Since then, the drawer has been signed by vice presidents Nelson Rockefeller, Walter Mondale, George H. W. Bush, Dan Quayle, Al Gore, Dick Cheney, Joe Biden, Mike Pence, and Kamala Harris.

== History ==
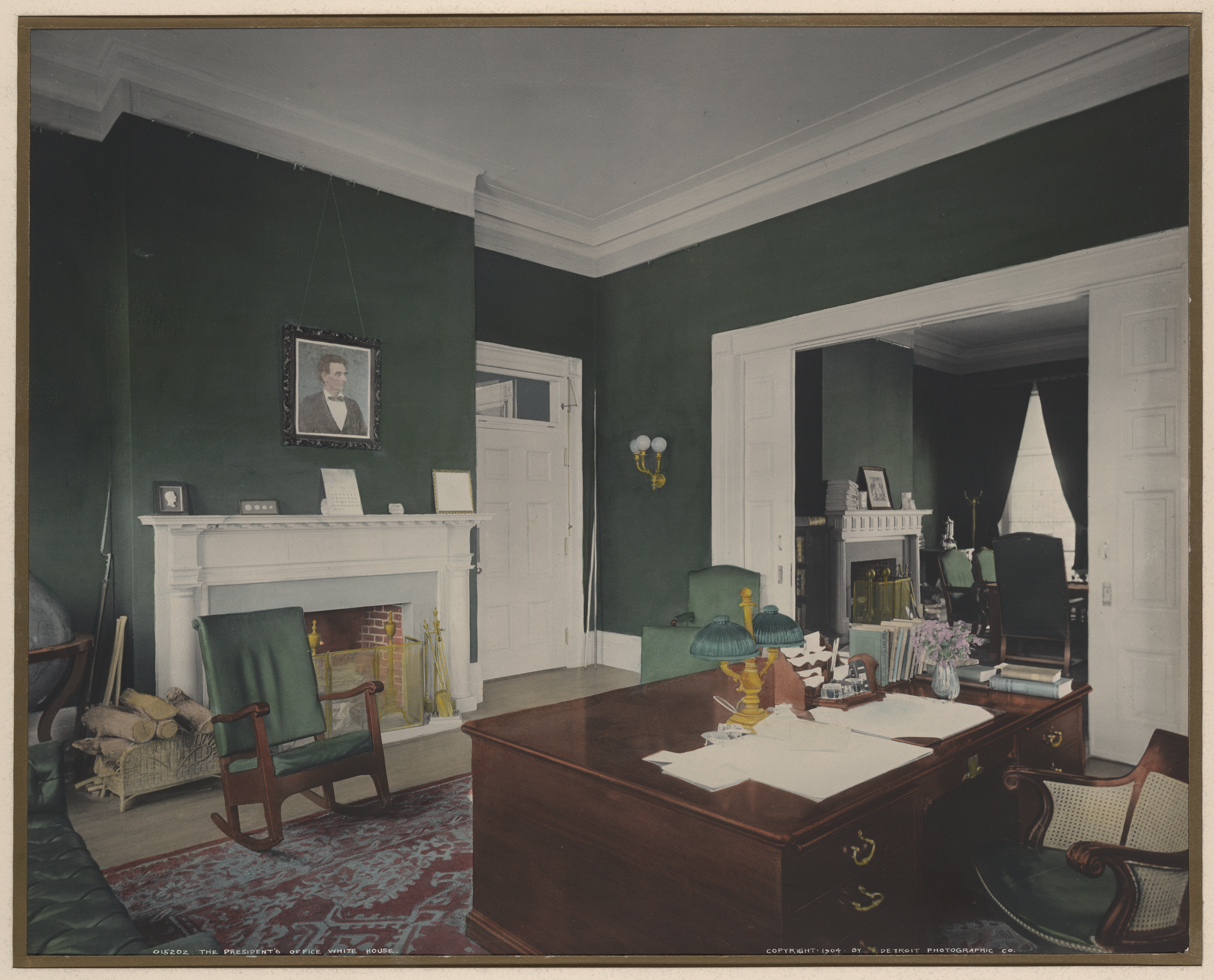
The Theodore Roosevelt desk in the Executive Office, 1904

=== 1902 White House renovation ===
In 1901, Vice President Theodore Roosevelt became President of the United States following the assassination of incumbent president William McKinley. Upon moving into the White House, the Roosevelts found the Victorian interiors crowded and dingy and generally too small for their large family. In 1902, a major renovation of the White House began to remove this Victoriana and bring the building to modern standards. Roosevelt's wife, Edith Roosevelt, worked with Charles Follen McKim of McKim, Mead, and White to achieve this renovation, which included the construction of a new Executive Office Building, now known as the West Wing. As part of this renovation, all furniture in the White House was replaced with new pieces, including this desk. This refurnishing was done with the stated aim to "design and furnish the interior in harmony with its neoclassical exterior architecture, in order that it would not be subject to changing fashion."

These new furnishings were part of a widespread attempt to develop a national design identity which had been growing since the Philadelphia Centennial Exposition. Betty C. Monkman explained through the White House Historical Association that at this time, "Americans looked back to the nation's origins and an idealized past and sought representative antiques or reproductions of furnishings from the earliest periods of the country's history. Colonial Revival furnishings and copies of English and French neoclassical styles were selected for rooms at the same time that a growing emphasis on lighter spaces and a reaction away from pattern in wallpaper, fabrics, and carpets—and from a certain busyness and 'artistic' clutter".

A pamphlet explaining the renovations of the White House from the time claimed that before this new set of furniture was purchased, there was "an inequality in the furniture of the whole house (owing to the unwillingness and piecemeal manner with which Congress votes any moneys for its decoration) which destroys its effect as a comfortable dwelling." The pamphlet extolled the new furniture and interiors with, "It is to be hoped that Congress will not always consider the furniture of the President's House as the scapegoat of all sumptuary and aristocratic sins, and that we shall soon be able to introduce strangers not only to a comfortable and well-appointed, but to a properly served and nicely kept, Presidential Mansion."

In 1902, planning for the interiors began in earnest for the executive offices, state rooms, and family spaces. Because of delays in funds appropriation from Congress, the project had less than six months for the interiors to be designed, built, and installed. The goal was to finish the spaces for the Winter 1903 social season. Mrs. Roosevelt was very hands on with the redesign of the White House and new office building and all fabrics and furniture had to be approved by her.

The budget for all of the furniture was $10,000, equivalent to $372,115 in 2025. A total of $14,054.77, equivalent to $523,000 in 2025, was actually spent on "furniture, carpets, rugs, electric lighting and other fixtures". Construction began on June 20, 1902, and wrapped up on September 29. The building was occupied in the middle of October.

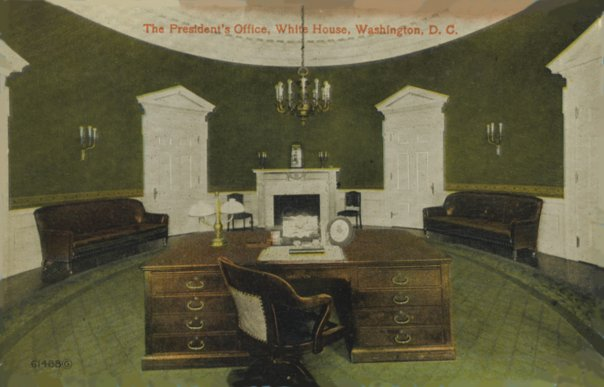
The Theodore Roosevelt desk in William Howard Taft's new Oval Office, 1909

In 1903, the desk, as well as all other furniture in the Executive Office Building, was designed by McKim and built by furniture-maker A. H. Davenport and Company in Boston, Massachusetts. Davenport worked closely with McKim to create furniture that worked within their concept and may have contributed design ideas as well.

=== Early use and 1929 fire ===
The desk was first used by Roosevelt in his Executive Office, in the location where the Roosevelt Room is found in the modern West Wing. Roosevelt's successor, President William Howard Taft, expanded the Executive Office Building further and added its first Oval Office. He moved the Theodore Roosevelt desk into the new space, called the "President's Office" or "Executive Office" at the time, and paired it with green burlap wall coverings, brass light fixtures, and additional mahogany furniture. The desk was the first one to be used in the Oval Office and remained in the room for twenty years, being used by Presidents Woodrow Wilson, Warren G. Harding, Calvin Coolidge, and Herbert Hoover. In March 1929, Hoover notably had the first telephone installed in the Oval Office on this desk.

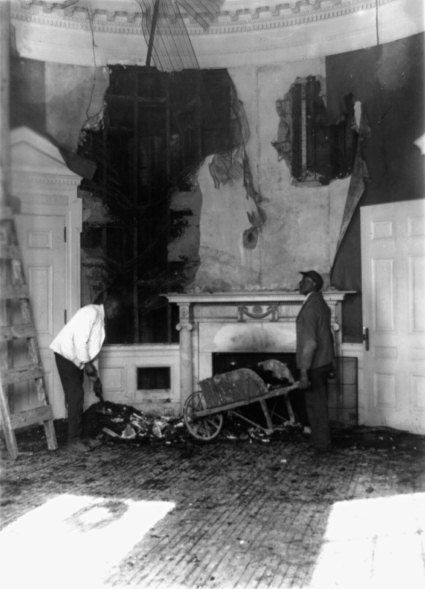
A photo taken on December 26, 1929, showing the damage to the Oval Office from the Christmas Eve fire that year

The West Wing suffered a major fire on December 24, 1929, during Herbert Hoover's presidency. This four-alarm fire was the most destructive to strike the White House since the Burning of Washington 115 years earlier. The fire was noticed at approximately 8 p.m. by White House messenger Charlie Williamson, and immediate action was taken to save items in the building. Chief Usher Ike Hoover, the president's son Allan Hoover, the president's personal secretaries Lawrence Richey and George Akerson, and some Secret Service agents crawled into the building through a window just to the left of the Theodore Roosevelt desk.

The first things they saved were current papers, followed by completely clearing the top of the desk and removing the drawers which were passed through the windows to safety. They then began removing steel cabinets full of files, the chair at the president's desk, and the presidential flag. They later saved the chairs the Cabinet used at cabinet meetings and more documents. All of these valuable objects and papers, including the Roosevelt desk drawers, were left on the White House Lawn and guarded all night by 150 infantrymen from the local Washington barracks. Akerson later stated that all historically and sentimentally valuable items in the president's office were saved.

While the desk drawers and their contents had been moved safely out of the building, the main body of the desk was still at risk, especially to water damage from the fire hoses on the freezing cold night. Ike Hoover acquired the tarpaulin awning that covered the White House's east entrance for the upcoming New Years Day reception and used it to cover and protect the desk. The fire was put out by approximately 10:30 p.m. leaving the executive offices, roof, attic, and floors heavily damaged and the press room completely ruined.

After the fire, President Hoover immediately started using the White House's Lincoln Study to conduct business in, and after a few days moved his official offices to what is now the Vice President's Ceremonial Office. No insurance had been taken out on the White House, so a special appropriation from Congress had to be made to repair the building. A contract was awarded on January 4, 1930, to Charles H. Tompkins Co. to do the repair work and it was completed on April 14 of the same year. The new Oval Office was built slightly larger and in the Colonial Revival style.

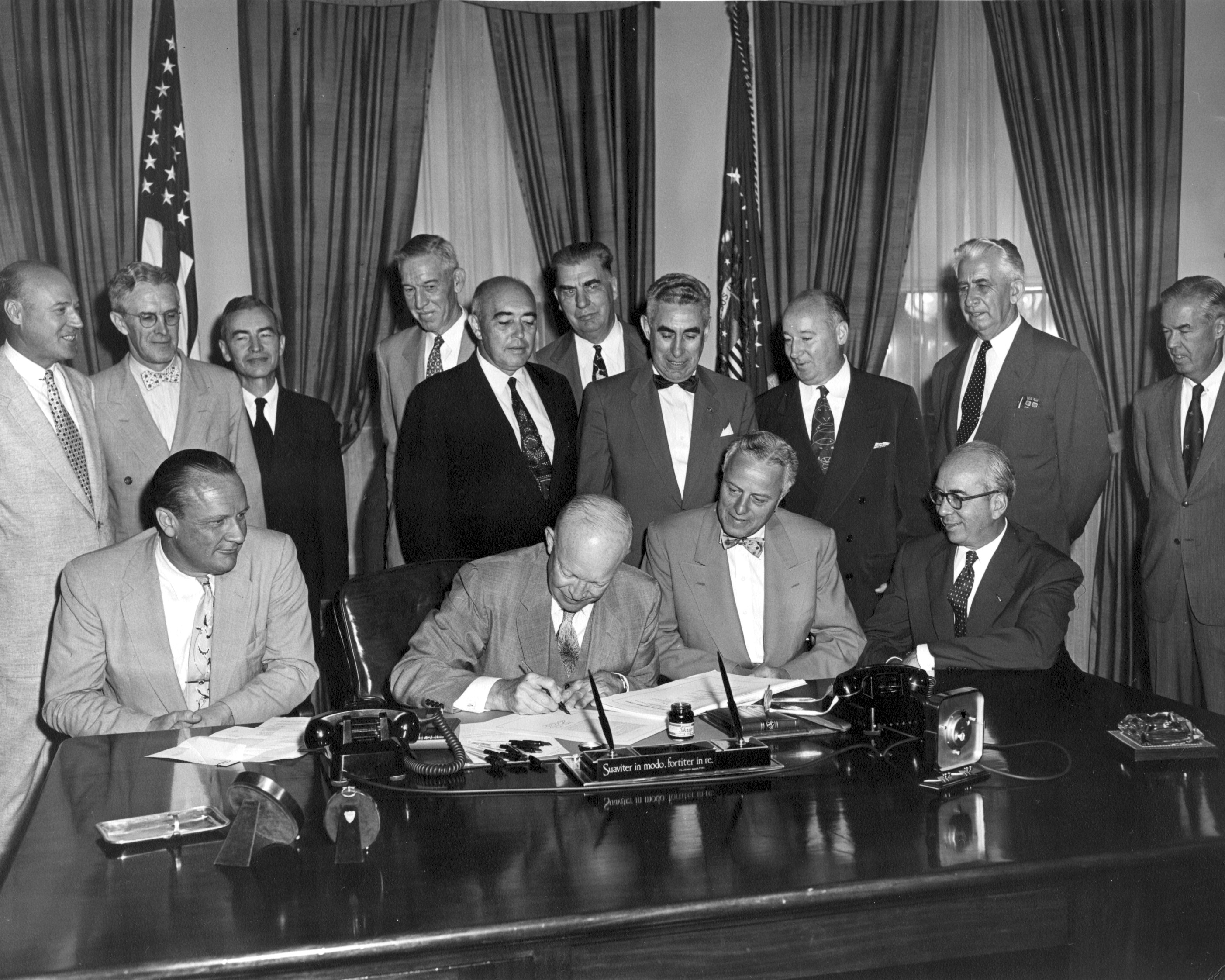
Eisenhower signing H.R. 9757, an act "to amend the Atomic Energy Act of 1946," on the desk, 1954

The desk survived this fire, was later fully repaired, and a duplicate of the desk was constructed. In December 1929, both desks were placed in storage. In 1930, an association of Grand Rapids, Michigan, furniture-makers built a new suite of 17 furniture pieces as a gift for the rebuilt Oval Office, including a new desk, now known as the Hoover desk. This desk was used by President Hoover for remainder of his term, and by Franklin D. Roosevelt during his presidency. After Franklin Roosevelt's death, the Hoover desk was given to his wife, Eleanor Roosevelt, by then president Harry S. Truman.

In 1945, the Theodore Roosevelt desk was brought back to the newly rebuilt Oval Office by Truman, who placed a sign reading "The Buck Stops Here" on it. The desk was also used by Dwight Eisenhower, who recorded conversations in the Oval Office with a microphone hidden in a fake desktop telephone, and briefly by John F. Kennedy, before it was switched out in 1961 for the Resolute desk. Jacqueline Kennedy, John F. Kennedy's wife, thought the more ornately carved Resolute desk should be the most visible presidential desk.

=== Use by Nixon and by vice presidents ===
When the Resolute desk was placed in the Oval Office, the Theodore Roosevelt desk was moved to the Vice President's Ceremonial Office, where Vice President Lyndon Johnson began using it. The desk has remained in this building since. It has been used by all vice presidents but one since Johnson in this room. Following the 1963 assassination of John F. Kennedy, Lyndon Johnson did not vacate the Vice President's Ceremonial Office. He continued using room 274 as his working office out of respect for Kennedy, leaving his Vice President, Hubert Humphrey, to work out of room 180 in the same building.

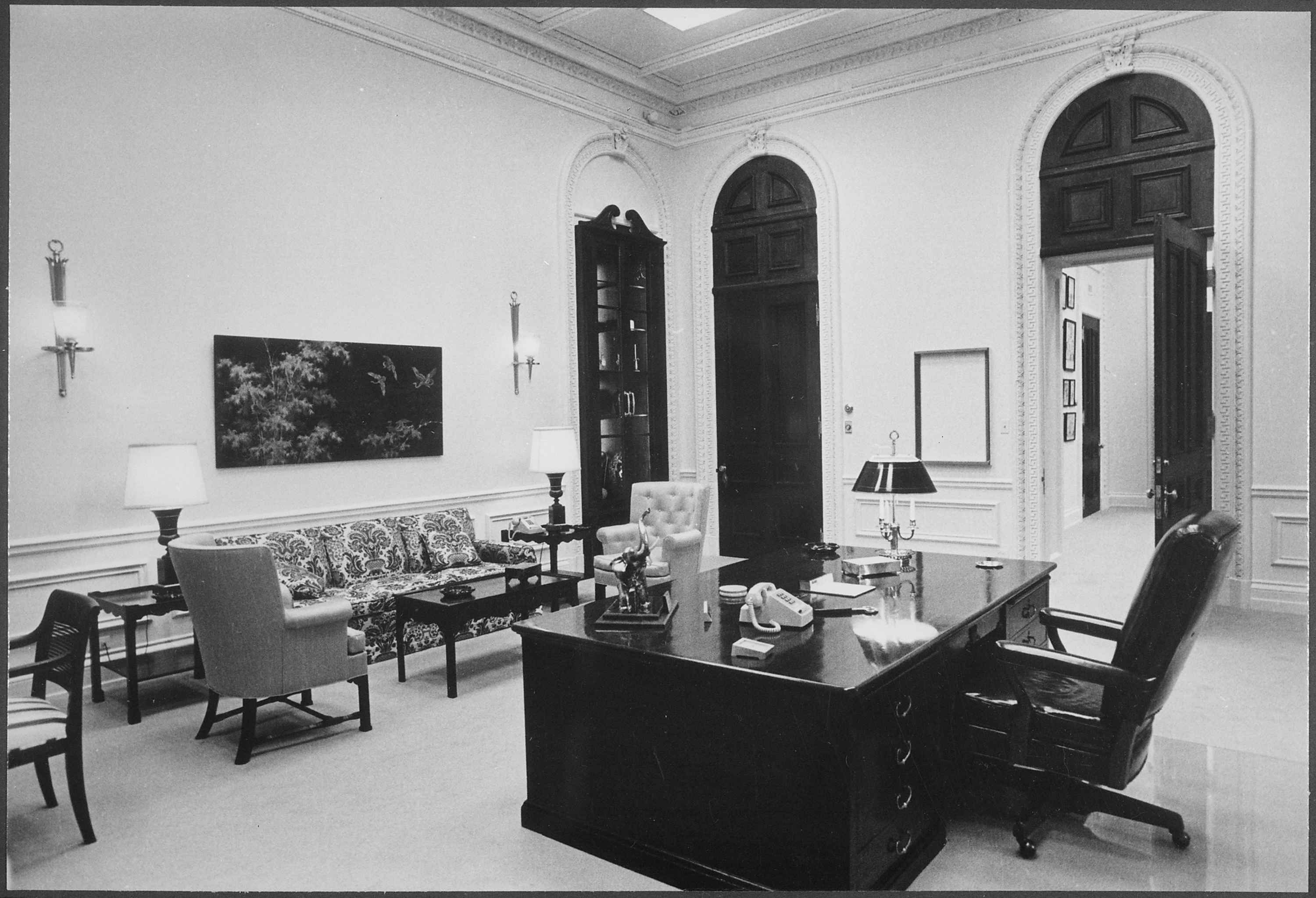
Nixon's Executive Office Building office in 1969, featuring the Theodore Roosevelt desk

In 1969, when President Richard Nixon ascended to the presidency, he decided to use the Oval Office as a ceremonial office. He turned room 180 of the Old Executive Office Building into his "working office" during his presidency. Nixon chose to use the Theodore Roosevelt desk in this room. In April 1971, as part of a larger installation of microphones across the president's spaces in the White House and associated buildings, four microphones were installed in the Theodore Roosevelt desk. Three microphones were attached to the edges of the desk and one was placed in the open knee hole.

The microphones were wired to an adjoining room where an audio mixer and sound recorder were housed. The telephone in this room was also tapped as part of a separate recording system. As part of this installation, a hole was drilled in the desktop to feed phone cables through and a recording apparatus was concealed in the left hand drawer of the desk. A lock was installed on this drawer to keep the device hidden. Some of the Watergate tapes were made by these recording devices.

White House deputy assistant Alexander Butterfield made the existence of the taping system publicly known during testimony before the Senate Watergate Committee. Alexander Haig, Nixon's Chief of Staff, ordered its dismantling within hours of the testimony. The entire taping system was removed two days later, on July 18, 1973. 204 recordings were made with these microphones while the system was in existence.

The desk was moved back to the Vice President's Ceremonial office following Nixon's resignation, where it has remained since, and has been used by all subsequent vice presidents. A tradition rose where each vice president signs the interior of the center drawer at the end of their time in office. Every vice president since Nelson Rockefeller has signed it. The signatures of presidents Truman, Eisenhower, and Johnson are also in the drawer.

In 2007, a two-alarm fire broke out in the Eisenhower Executive Office centered on an electrical closet, or telephone room, near the Vice President's Ceremonial Office. There were no serious injuries. It is unclear if the desk suffered any damage, but the office suffered smoke and water damage, with the floors described as being "under water."

== Timeline ==
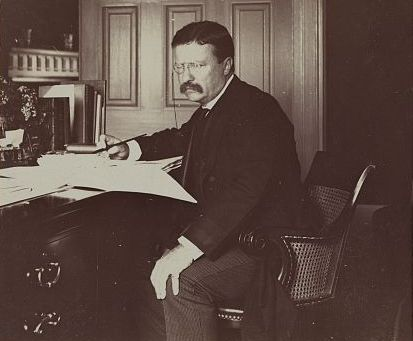
Theodore Roosevelt sitting at the desk during his presidency

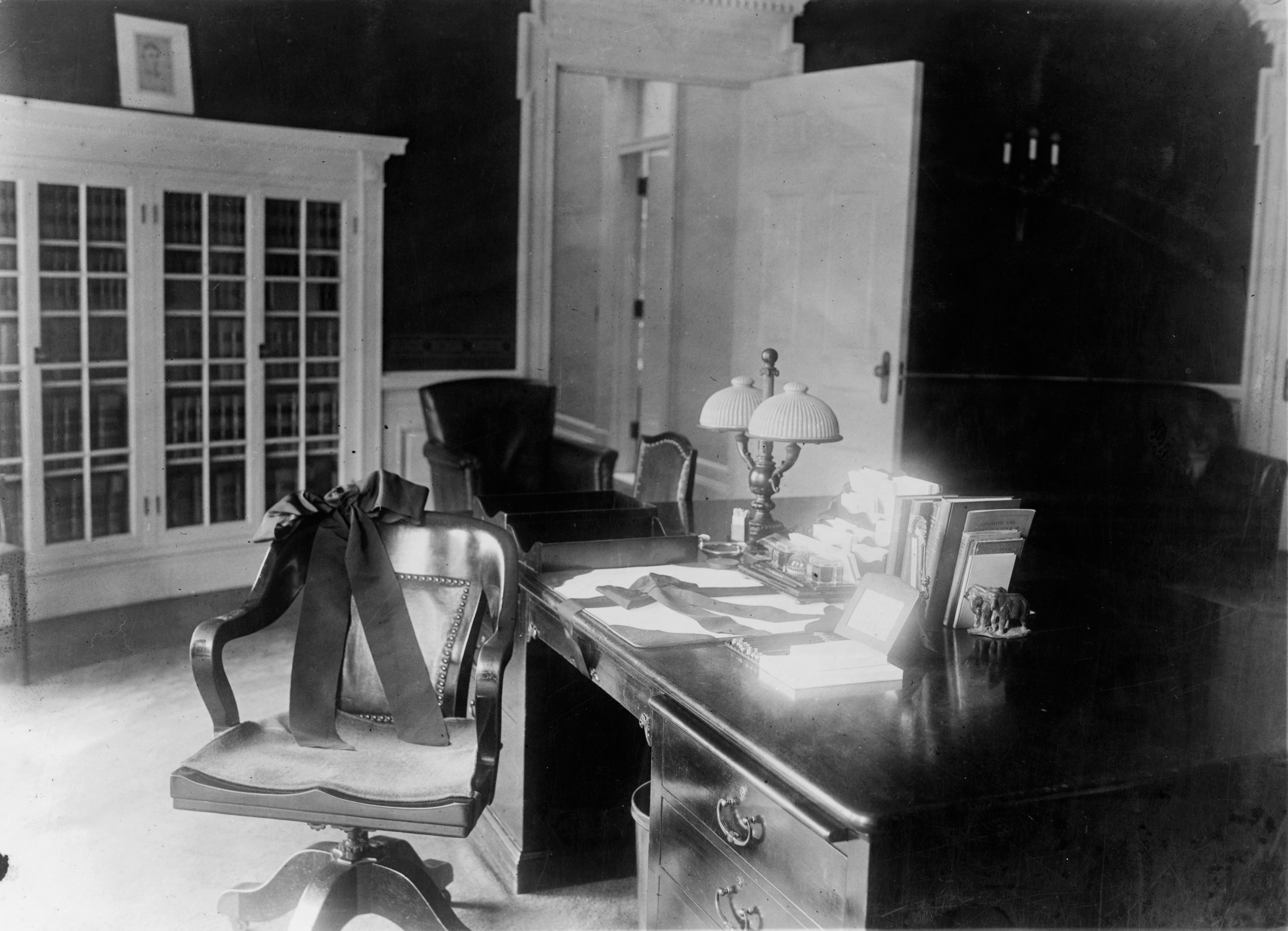
The desk and Warren G. Harding's chair with mourning crepe, on August 8, 1923, the day of his funeral

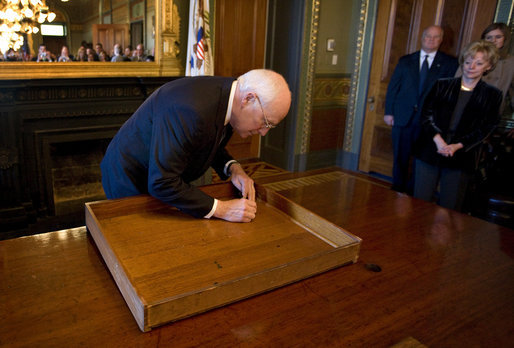
Vice-President Cheney signing the desk drawer near the end of his term in office, January 12, 2009

The following table shows the location and users of the Theodore Roosevelt desk from its 1902 installation in the Executive Office Building to the present.

Timeline of presidents and vice president who used the Theodore Roosevelt desk
Tenant	Location	Dates	Ref.
Theodore Roosevelt	White House Executive Office	1902–1909	
William Howard Taft	Oval Office; White House	1909–1929	
Woodrow Wilson	Oval Office; White House	1909–1929	
Warren G. Harding	Oval Office; White House	1909–1929	
Calvin Coolidge	Oval Office; White House	1909–1929	
Herbert Hoover	Oval Office; White House	1909–1929	
Storage		1929–1945	
Harry S. Truman	Oval Office; White House	1945–1961	
Dwight D. Eisenhower	Oval Office; White House	1945–1961	
Lyndon B. Johnson	Vice President's Ceremonial Office; Eisenhower Executive Office Building	1961–1969	
Richard Nixon	Room 180; Eisenhower Executive Office Building	1969–1974	
Nelson Rockefeller	Vice President's Ceremonial Office; Eisenhower Executive Office Building	1974–present	
Walter Mondale	Vice President's Ceremonial Office; Eisenhower Executive Office Building	1974–present	
George H. W. Bush	Vice President's Ceremonial Office; Eisenhower Executive Office Building	1974–present	
Dan Quayle	Vice President's Ceremonial Office; Eisenhower Executive Office Building	1974–present	
Al Gore	Vice President's Ceremonial Office; Eisenhower Executive Office Building	1974–present	
Dick Cheney	Vice President's Ceremonial Office; Eisenhower Executive Office Building	1974–present	
Joe Biden	Vice President's Ceremonial Office; Eisenhower Executive Office Building	1974–present	
Mike Pence	Vice President's Ceremonial Office; Eisenhower Executive Office Building	1974–present	
Kamala Harris	Vice President's Ceremonial Office; Eisenhower Executive Office Building	1974–present	
JD Vance	Vice President's Ceremonial Office; Eisenhower Executive Office Building	1974–present	

== Replicas ==
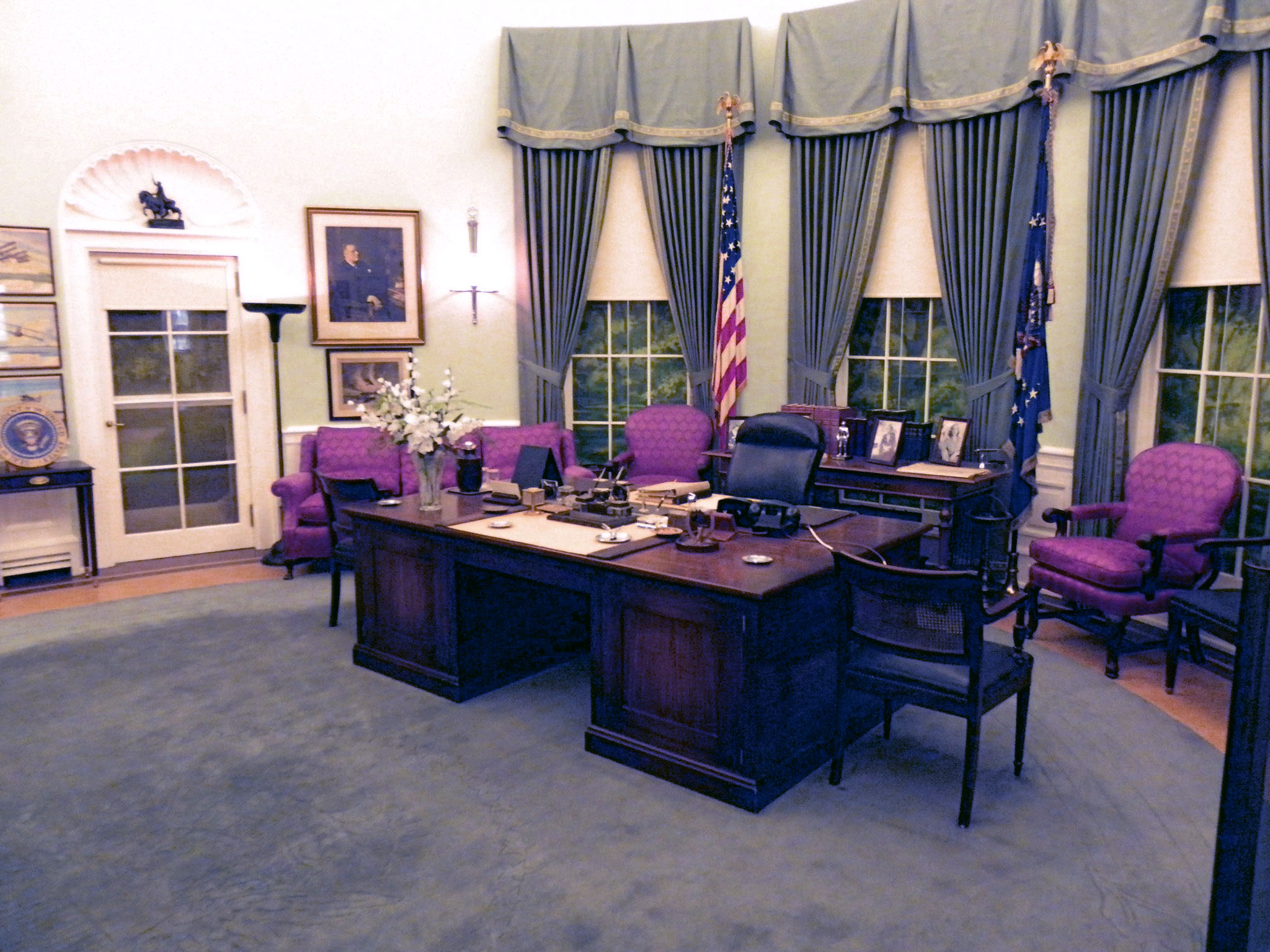
A replica desk in the Harry S. Truman Presidential Library and Museum

The Harry S. Truman Presidential Library and Museum in Independence, Missouri, has a replica of the Theodore Roosevelt desk as part of a full-scale replica of the Oval Office as it was during Truman's presidency. The objects on the desk include both originals and reproductions as seen in a series of images taken in August 1950.

A second replica of the desk is in White House storage. This duplicate was made between 1929 and 1930 after the original desk was damaged in the 1929 Christmas Eve West Wing fire.
