= Naomi Savage =

American photographer

- Naomi Savage by Man Ray
- Born: June 25, 1927
- Died: November 22, 2005 (aged 78)
- Known for: Photography

Naomi Siegler Savage (June 25, 1927 – November 22, 2005) was an American photographer.

== Early life and education ==
Born Naomi Siegler, she was a native of Princeton, New Jersey. Her parents were Samuel Siegler and Elsie Siegler (née Radnitzky), a sister of Man Ray. She first studied photography under Berenice Abbott at the New School for Social Research in 1943, following this with studies in art, photography, and music at Bennington College from 1944 until 1947. The next year she spent in California with her uncle, studying his techniques. In 1950 she married the architect and sculptor David Savage, with whom she moved to Paris, living there for some years.

== Career ==
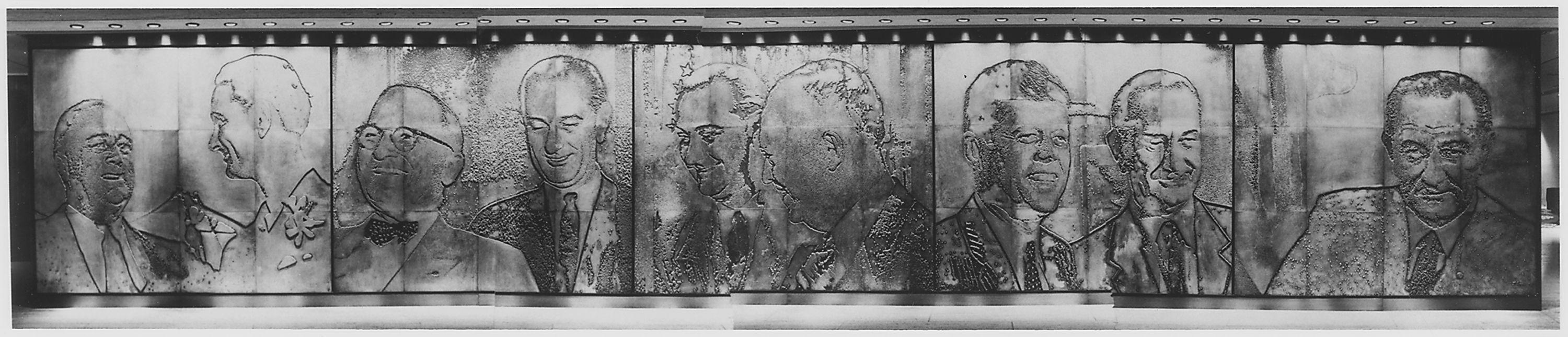
Naomi Savage created this mural for the Lyndon Baines Johnson library in 1972.

During her career Savage received an award from the Cassandra Foundation in 1970, and a photography fellowship from the National Endowment for the Arts in 1971. In 1976 she received the silver award from the Art Directors Club. Later in life, Savage returned to live in Princeton, where she died.

Savage was heavily influenced by her uncle, Man Ray, prompting her to experiment with the medium of photography, combining traditional techniques with more unusual processes, including some of her own design. She worked extensively with photogravure and photoengraving, transforming these mechanical printing techniques to be used for aesthetic effects rather than duplication.

Unlike many photographers, Savage considered the metal plates upon which photographs are etched to be works of art in their own right. She pioneered using the photographic metal plate to produce a three-dimensional form with a metallic surface.

Savage explored variations in color and texture in her work, often by using inked and intaglio relief prints. Many of her works were created by combining media such as collage, negative images, texture screening, multiple exposure, photograms, solarization, toning, and printing on metallic foils. Her works focus on a variety of subject matter and imagery, including portraits, landscapes, human figures, mannequins, masks, toys, kitchen utensils, and dental and ophthalmological equipment.

== Legacy ==
Several of her pieces are owned by the Museum of Modern Art, and she is represented as well in the collections of the Art Institute of Chicago, the International Center for Photography, the Fogg Art Museum, the Museum of Fine Arts, Houston, and the Madison Art Center. A photoengraved mural depicting the life of Lyndon Baines Johnson is a centerpiece of the Lyndon Baines Johnson Library and Museum. A collection of her papers relating to the life of Man Ray is held by the Archives of American Art at the Smithsonian Institution.
