= Johnson desk =

Oval office desk

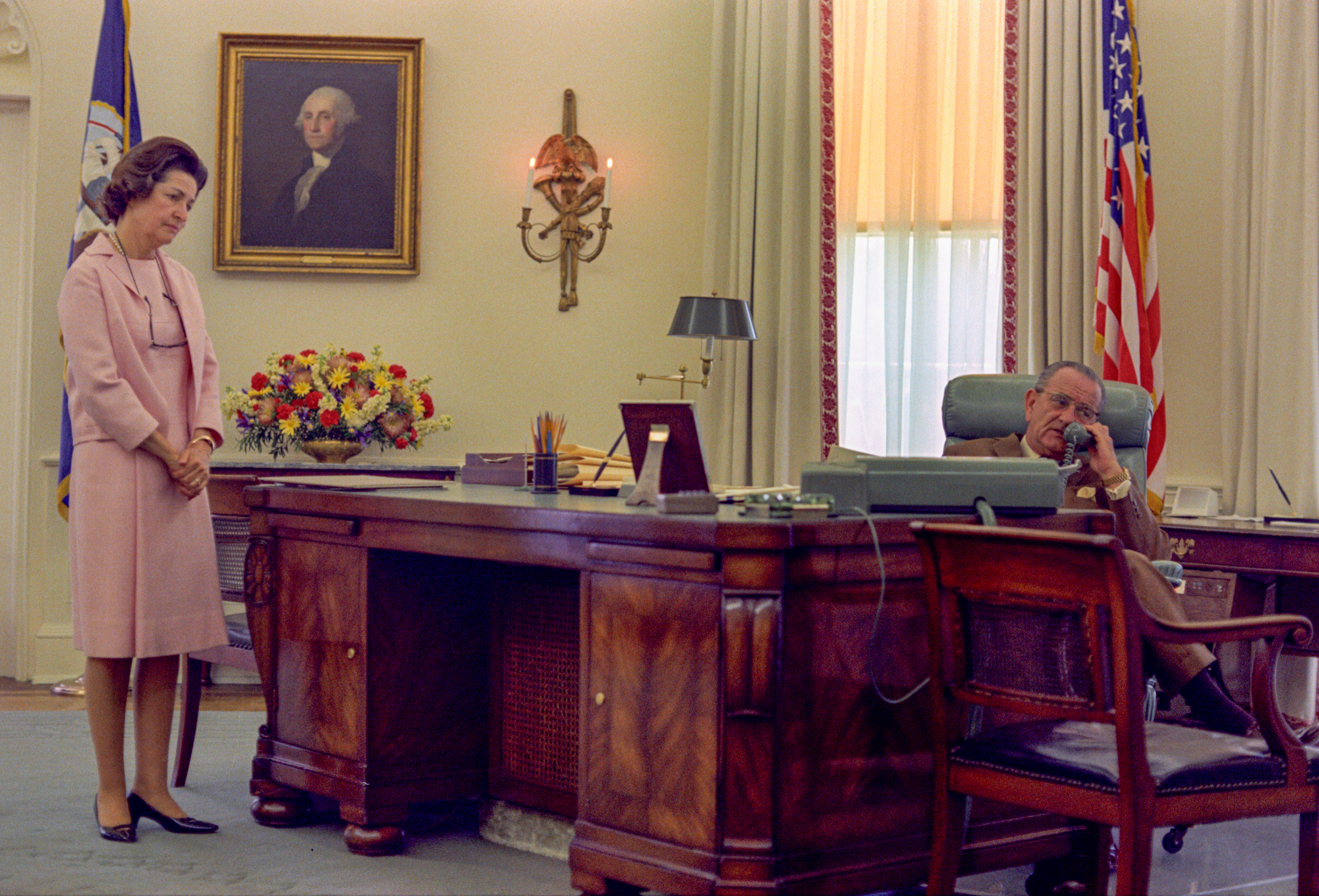
- Lady Bird Johnson listening to President Lyndon B. Johnson, at the desk, on the phone upon Robert Kennedy's death
- Designer: Thomas D. Wadelton
- Date: 1909
- Made in: Chicago, Illinois
- Materials: Mahogany, leather
- Height: 30.25 in (76.8 cm)
- Width: 75.5 in (192 cm)
- Depth: 42.5 in (108 cm)
- Collection: United States Senate

The Johnson desk is a mahogany partners desk that was used by U.S. president Lyndon B. Johnson in the Oval Office as his Oval Office desk. One of only six desks used by a president in the Oval Office, it was designed by Thomas D. Wadelton and built in 1909 by S. Karpen and Bros. in Chicago. The desk was built as part of 125 seven-piece office sets for senators' offices in the Russell Senate Office Building. Each pedestal of the desk contains two writing slides, three drawers, a hinged door cabinet, and sits on four bun feet. This desk was used by Johnson during his terms as U.S. senator, vice president, and president. Following Johnson's presidency, the desk was relocated to the Lyndon Baines Johnson Library and Museum as part of a replica Oval Office.

== Design and markings ==
The Johnson Desk is a mahogany partners desk. The designs of the front and the back of the desk are mirrors of each other. Each face of the two pedestal desk has three drawers on one pedestal and a hinged-door cabinet on the other. The desk has four writing slides, two on each side, and each pedestal sits on four bun feet. Mahogany veneer covers the desk's top and sides as well as the drawer and cabinet fronts. A central foot stretcher was originally upholstered with leather.

Each of the four corners of the desk is built with a rectangular, outset, console bracket with a stylized flower blossom carved into each side. The desk is 30.25 in (76.8 cm) tall with a work surface measuring 75.5 in (192 cm) wide and 42.5 in (108 cm) deep. There is a manufacturer's tag on the interior of both top-right drawers which reads "GEO. W. COBB JR. / COMMERCIAL FURNITURE / NEW YORK, N.Y." Blocks were later added under the feet of the desk to accommodate Johnson's legs.

The desk was designed as part of a seven-piece office furniture set for rooms in the Russell Senate Office Building. Thomas Hastings, one of the architects of the building, said the furniture pieces were designed to be "very American" in style, and inspiration for the design was drawn from "old books of the furniture of our forefathers". After inspecting models of the furniture designs, Hastings said, "So far as I am capable of judging, I think it is going to be the swellest set of furniture of the time that I have ever seen. It is the real thing, and has all the character and dignity which it seems to me furniture for the United States senators should have." He also commented on the "rich brown color" achieved on the furniture pieces as well as the "effects obtained by matching the veneers".

When in the Oval Office, Lyndon B. Johnson used a modified green vinyl helicopter seat, complete with built-in ashtray, as his chair at the desk.

== History ==
=== Senate years ===
The Johnson desk was designed by Thomas D. Wadelton, a New York cabinetmaker, and built by S. Karpen and Bros. in Chicago under contract with George W. Cobb, Jr. It was one of 125 identical desks constructed for the Russell Senate Office Building. Opened on March 5, 1909, the Russell Building was designed by Carrère & Hastings and was constructed to alleviate overcrowding in the Capitol building. The new structure provided 98 additional suites, 10 individual rooms, and 8 committee rooms for Senate offices.

Each desk cost $80.00 (equivalent to $2,867 in 2025) and was part of a set of standard furniture for each Senator's office. According to the Senate, in addition to the desk this set included "a swivel desk chair, a round arm chair, a square arm chair, a small side chair, an easy chair, and a davenport". Ninety-two sets of furniture were created for the opening of the Russell Building, one set for each of the Senators from the then-existing 46 states, with additional sets ordered after the building opened.

The building was expanded in 1933 and six additional desks were manufactured for the new rooms. The furniture for the Russell Building was the largest single furniture contract issued by the Senate. As of November 2020, many of the pieces continued to be in use.

In 1948, Lyndon B. Johnson was narrowly elected to the Senate and quickly moved up the ranks, becoming Democratic whip in 1951, Democratic leader in 1953, and Senate majority leader in 1955. Over the course of this quick succession of positions, Johnson continually worked out of Room 231 in the Russell Senate Office Building, then simply known as the Senate Office Building.

After becoming majority leader, Johnson appropriated a room on the third floor of the Capitol Building as the majority leader's working office. This space, being one floor above the Senate Chamber, turned out to be inconvenient for Johnson. In 1958, a new office building was built to house Senate committees, freeing up highly sought-after space in the Capitol building. In 1959, Johnson moved his majority leader's office to Rooms S-211 and S-212, which were originally designed for the Senate Library but used for the Senate District of Columbia Committee instead.

Johnson was particularly fond of Room S-211 where he placed his desk, and which was later renamed "The Lyndon Baines Johnson Room". Johnson had the room refurbished in vibrant colors and it picked up the nickname "Taj Mahal". Johnson continued to use these rooms even after becoming Vice President in 1961, forcing the majority leader at the time, Mike Mansfield, to open a new office across the hall. Johnson stopped using these rooms only once he ascended to the office of President.

=== Oval Office ===
After President John F. Kennedy's assassination, Johnson did not move into the Oval Office for several days. Johnson claimed that Robert Kennedy "kept him out" of the office for this time. He finally did begin using the room on November 26, 1963. When he entered the Oval Office, a series of changes were made to the room, including a new red rug and white drapes, that had been planned by Jacqueline Kennedy but not completed until that point due to updates to an air-conditioning system. Johnson had the Resolute desk, which Kennedy had used in the office, removed and replaced with the desk that he had used throughout his time in the Senate and as Vice President. The Resolute desk went on tour around the country at this time to help raise funds for the John F. Kennedy Presidential Library and Museum and was subsequently put on view at the Smithsonian Institution.

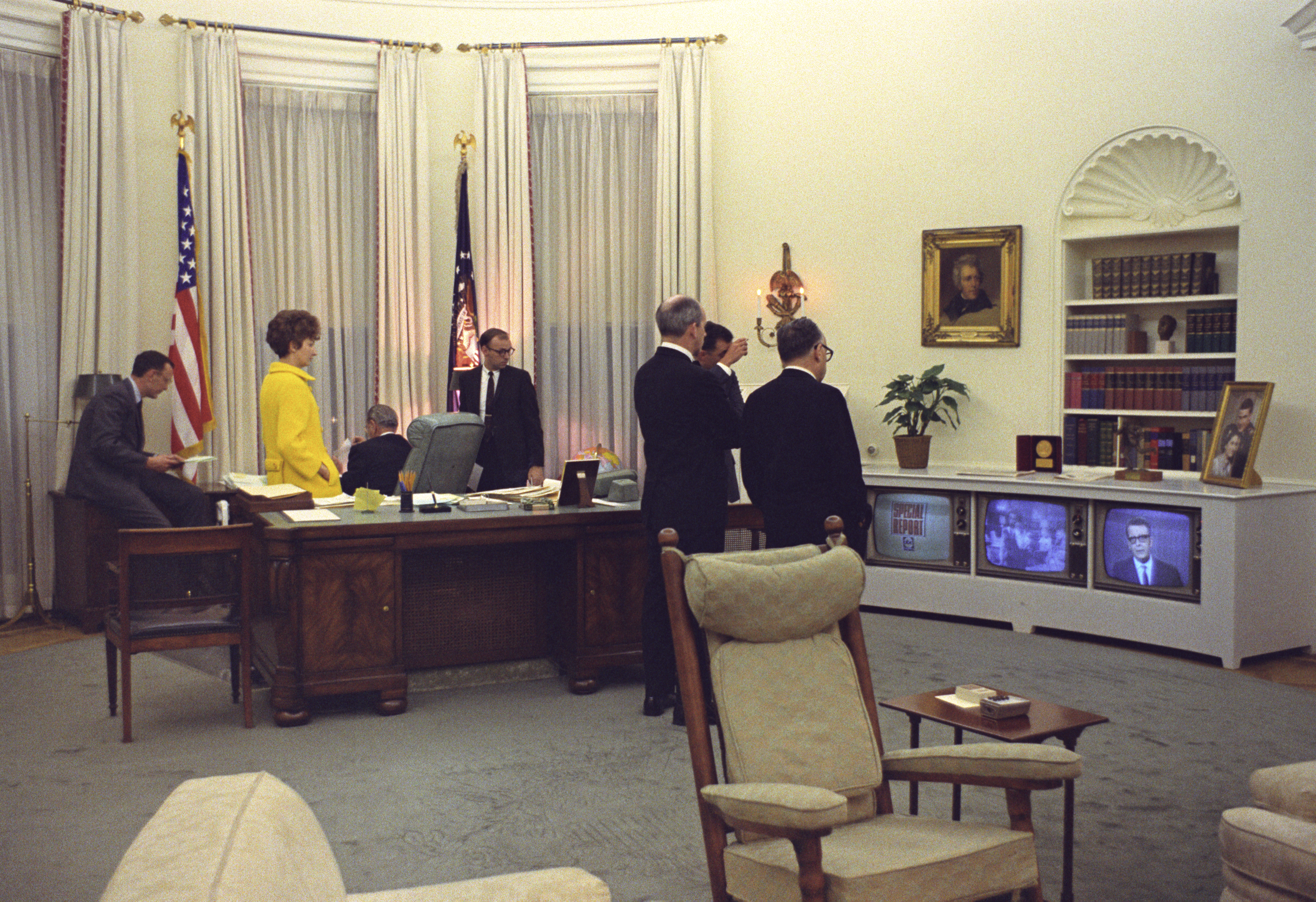
Johnson and members of his staff around the Johnson desk on April 4, 1968, watching news programs about the assassination of Martin Luther King Jr.

Juanita Roberts, chief personal secretary to President Johnson, spoke in a 1969 oral history interview about the transition of objects into and out of the Oval Office when Johnson assumed the presidency. Roberts said:

We worked on Sunday. That was the day, I believe, yes, that President Kennedy's casket was moved to the Rotunda of the Capitol for him to lie in state there. On that afternoon, Sunday afternoon, I did make a trip up to our office in the Capitol, and marked items for packing to come down to the White House. I marked a couch and the desk and the personal items, and things that I knew would make him feel more comfortable the sooner we could get them. That was a difficult trip to make; the crowds were so great and trying to get into the Capitol Building was a difficult thing.

Roberts continued on to describe that Johnson was to begin using the office for the first time the day after Kennedy's funeral. Much of Kennedy's belongings had already been cleared out due to the carpet and curtain installation, leaving just a few paintings, books on shelves, two couches, a coffee table, two lamp tables, and the Resolute desk remaining. Johnson's desk was put on a truck and was standing by as new books from the White House library were added to the shelves in the room. That first day much of the furnishings remained the same, with Roberts pointing out that she did not have time to switch out paintings, but did make sure the White House florist brought in flowers and a seamstress got new "glass cover" curtains created and installed in the windows.

External videos
- "LBJ desk cleaned, moved out; Roosevelt desk brought back into White House Oval Office" clip from the White House Naval Photographic Unit January 1969 reel. From the Lyndon Baines Johnson Library and Museum moving picture collection.

During Johnson's presidency he was known for having extramarital affairs with what Robert Dallek in his book Lone Star Rising: Lyndon Johnson and His Times called a harem of women. Dallek was referencing a journalist who knew Johnson since 1937 with this remark. Ronald Kessler in his book Inside the Whitehouse describes multiple sexual encounters between Johnson and his secretaries in the Oval Office including one where his wife, Ladybird Johnson, walked in on Johnson and a secretary in the midst of having sex, leading to the installation of a buzzer system to warn him if Ladybird was on her way. Dallek describes an encounter Johnson had with an unnamed White House secretary who claimed they had "casual sex on an office desk."

Wesley O. Hagood notes in his book Presidential Sex that while it has been documented Johnson had sex with at least one secretary on a desk in the White House it was never specified if that desk was the Johnson desk in the Oval Office or not. John M. Berecz disagrees in his book All the Presidents' Women: An Examination of Sexual Styles of Presidents Truman through Clinton, stating "One White House secretary is reported to have had sex with him on the desk in the Oval Office."

In January 1969 the desk was cleared off and removed from the White House. It was replaced by the Wilson desk, which was chosen by Richard Nixon for his tenure in the Oval Office.

=== Post-presidency ===
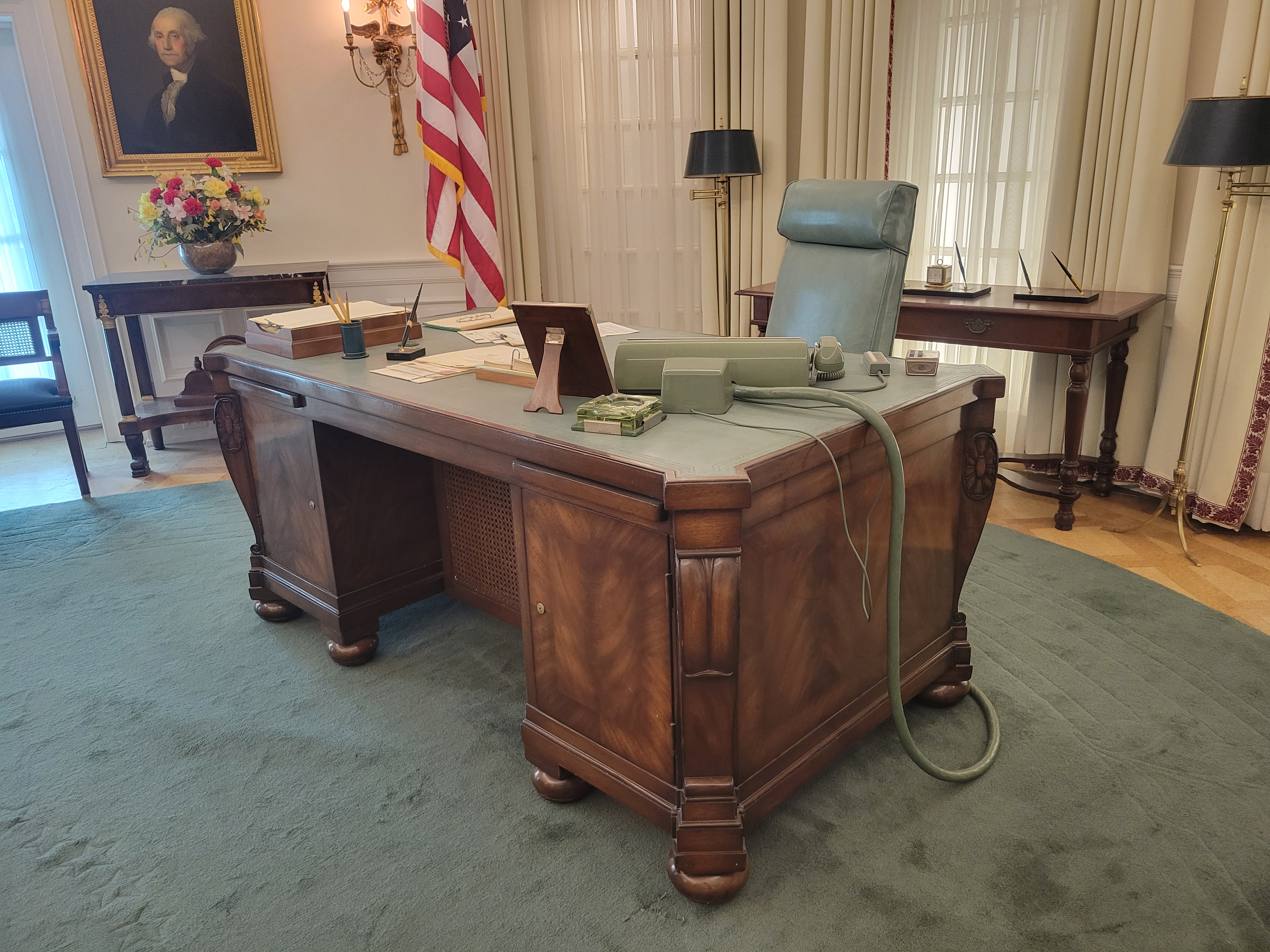
The Johnson desk in the replica Oval Office at the Lyndon Baines Johnson Library and Museum

On October 10, 1968, Johnson called Gordon Bunshaft, the architect for the forthcoming Johnson Library and Museum, to discuss the presidential library he was designing and his desire to have the Johnson desk moved to it. He stated, "I hate to build me a little one out there at the side and say, this is the way the President's office looked. And here's his desk and here's his chair. Here's his FDR picture... maybe we don't have to have the same height ceiling... and maybe we can't have the same oval room... But it seems to me that if we could, we ought to take this rug out of here and this—just as the Kennedys are doing and have done, just as the Trumans did—and ought to take the desk and ought to take the chairs..."

The Johnson desk was moved to the Lyndon Baines Johnson Library and Museum in Austin, Texas, and sits in the 7/8-scale replica Oval Office there. Johnson was known to sit at the desk on occasion to surprise visitors.

The Johnson desk is one of four individual desks that once belonged to the United States Senate that Johnson had moved to the Johnson Library. Aside from this desk the museum holds two additional similar mahogany desks from the Russell Building and a smaller desk on which Johnson signed the Voting Rights Act. In 1968 Majority Leader Mike Mansfield created the Senate Commission on Art in part to keep antiques from being removed by the Senate in the way these desks were taken.

== Replicas ==
Both a replica of the Johnson desk and the chair Johnson used behind it were featured prominently in Christopher Acebo's scenic design for the Robert Schenkkan play All The Way. This play dramatizes Johnson's first year as president with the first act chronicling Johnson's work to achieve the Civil Rights Act and the second act centering Johnson's struggle to be reelected. All the Way was first presented at the Oregon Shakespeare Festival, then at American Repertory Theater, before being presented on Broadway at the Neil Simon Theatre in 2014. A television film based on the play premiered on HBO on May 21, 2016.
