= Lyndon Baines Johnson Library and Museum =

Presidential library and museum in Austin, Texas

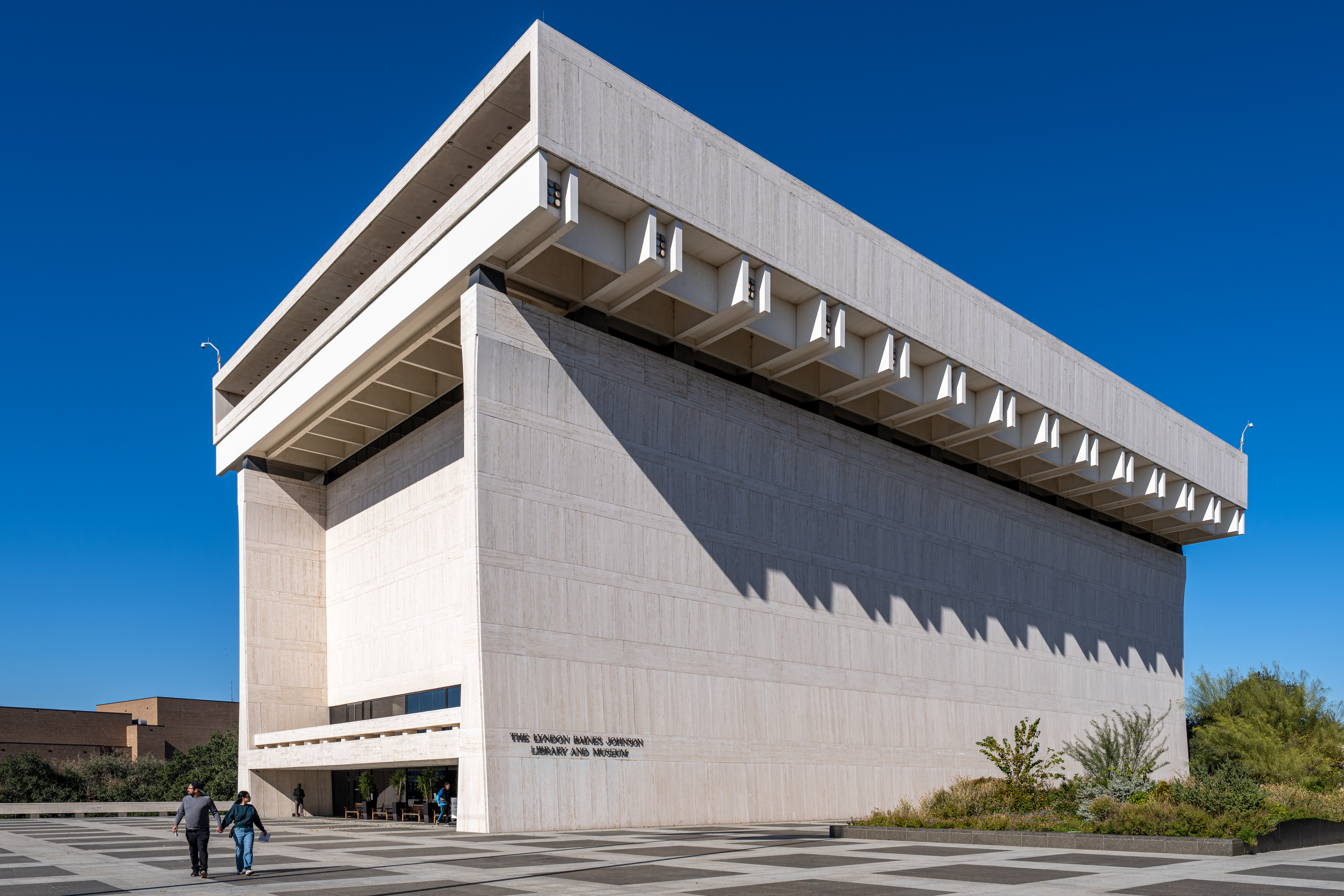
- The Lyndon Baines Johnson Library and Museum in 2025

- Location within Texas Location within the United States

General information
- Location: 2313 Red River St, Austin, Texas, United States
- Coordinates: 30.2857°N 97.7292°W
- Named for: Lyndon B. Johnson
- Inaugurated: Dedicated on May 22, 1971; 55 years ago
- Operator: National Archives and University of Texas at Austin

Technical details
- Size: 14 acres (5.7 ha)

Design and construction
- Architect: Gordon Bunshaft of Skidmore, Owings & Merrill

Website
- lbjlibrary.org

The Lyndon Baines Johnson Library and Museum, also known as the LBJ Presidential Library, is the presidential library and museum of Lyndon Baines Johnson, the 36th president of the United States (1963–1969). It is located on the grounds of the University of Texas at Austin, and is one of 15 presidential libraries administered by the National Archives and Records Administration. The library contains approximately 650,000 photographs, 7,500 video recordings, 45 million documents, and 12,000 audio recordings related to Johnson's presidency.

== History ==
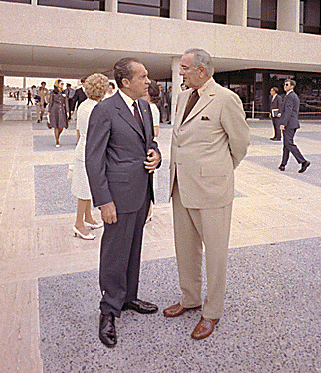
Presidents Nixon and Johnson at the museum's dedication in 1971

Discussions for a presidential library for Johnson began soon after his 1964 election victory. In February 1965, the chairman of the Board of Regents at the University of Texas at Austin, William H. Heath, proposed building the library on the university campus, along with funds to construct the building and the establishment of the Johnson School of Public Affairs on the campus. The agreement was formally reached on September 6, 1966. While past presidential libraries were funded by private donations, the publicly-funded University of Texas paid $15 million of the $18 million needed to construct the complex and donated the land for the library, which was formerly a low-income neighborhood acquired by the university using eminent domain.

First Lady Lady Bird Johnson toured existing presidential libraries and university campuses to consult the design of the library. Lady Bird presented three potential architects to President Johnson; Gordon Bunshaft of Skidmore, Owings & Merrill was chosen. The design was completed in the summer of 1966 and construction began in 1967. The Library was dedicated on May 22, 1971, with Johnson and then-President Richard Nixon in attendance.

In 1991 Queen Elizabeth II visited the museum and met with Johnson's family, as he was the only U.S. president during her reign whom she had never met; her only opportunity to meet him was when Winston Churchill was buried in 1965. But Johnson had the flu and bronchitis and was hospitalized at the time of Churchill's passing. He was prohibited by his physicians from leading the U.S. delegation at the funeral. He had very much wanted to attend the funeral, and the queen had arranged a private meeting with him at Buckingham Palace after the funeral before his doctors barred him from going. After her death in July 2007, the body of Lady Bird Johnson lay in repose in the library and museum, just as was done for her husband after his death, 34 years earlier in January 1973.

In 2012, the LBJ Library underwent a multimillion-dollar redesign, during which most of the exhibits were closed. On December 22, the library reopened to the public. In 2013, the library began charging admission for the first time since its dedication in 1971.

The LBJ Library's main exhibit temporarily closed in October 2025 to allow for a "refresh" directed at younger generations and past visitors. Changes included interactive elements and an updated look. The exhibit reopened in March 2026.

== Features ==
The complex, which was designed by Skidmore, Owings & Merrill architects Gordon Bunshaft and R. Max Brooks, is an unadorned 10-story building clad in cream Italian travertine. The library, adjacent to the Lyndon B. Johnson School of Public Affairs, occupies a 14-acre (57,000 m^{2}) campus. Although the library is on the grounds of UT Austin, it is federally run and independent from the university. The top floor of the library has a 7/8ths scale replica of the Oval Office decorated as it was during Johnson's presidency, including the Johnson desk. Another exhibit features an animatronic LBJ. The view of the Texas State Capitol from the library's terrace became one of the Capitol View Corridors protected under state and local law from obstruction by tall buildings in 1983.

The LBJ Library provides year-round public viewing of its permanent historical, cultural, and temporary exhibits to approximately 125,000 visitors each year. It is open from 9 a.m. until 5 p.m. seven days a week throughout the year. The Library is closed on Thanksgiving, Christmas, and New Year's Day.

Among the artworks on display at the library and museum is a photoengraved mural depicting scenes from Johnson's life created by Naomi Savage.

== LBJ Liberty & Justice for All Award ==
The library honors public servants with the "LBJ Liberty & Justice for All Award". The award is given to leaders who demonstrate civility and bipartisanship.

Recipients:

- 2010: John Lewis
- 2013: George H. W. Bush
- 2014: John Dingell and Carl Levin
- 2015: Jim Clyburn and Eric Holder
- 2016: Jimmy Carter
- 2017: David Rubenstein
- 2018: John McCain
- 2019: Nancy Pelosi
- 2020: Ruth Bader Ginsburg
- 2023: Willie Nelson
- 2024: Joe Biden

== See also ==
- D. B. Hardeman Prize
- Presidential memorials in the United States
