= The Avenue in the Rain =

1917 painting by Childe Hassam

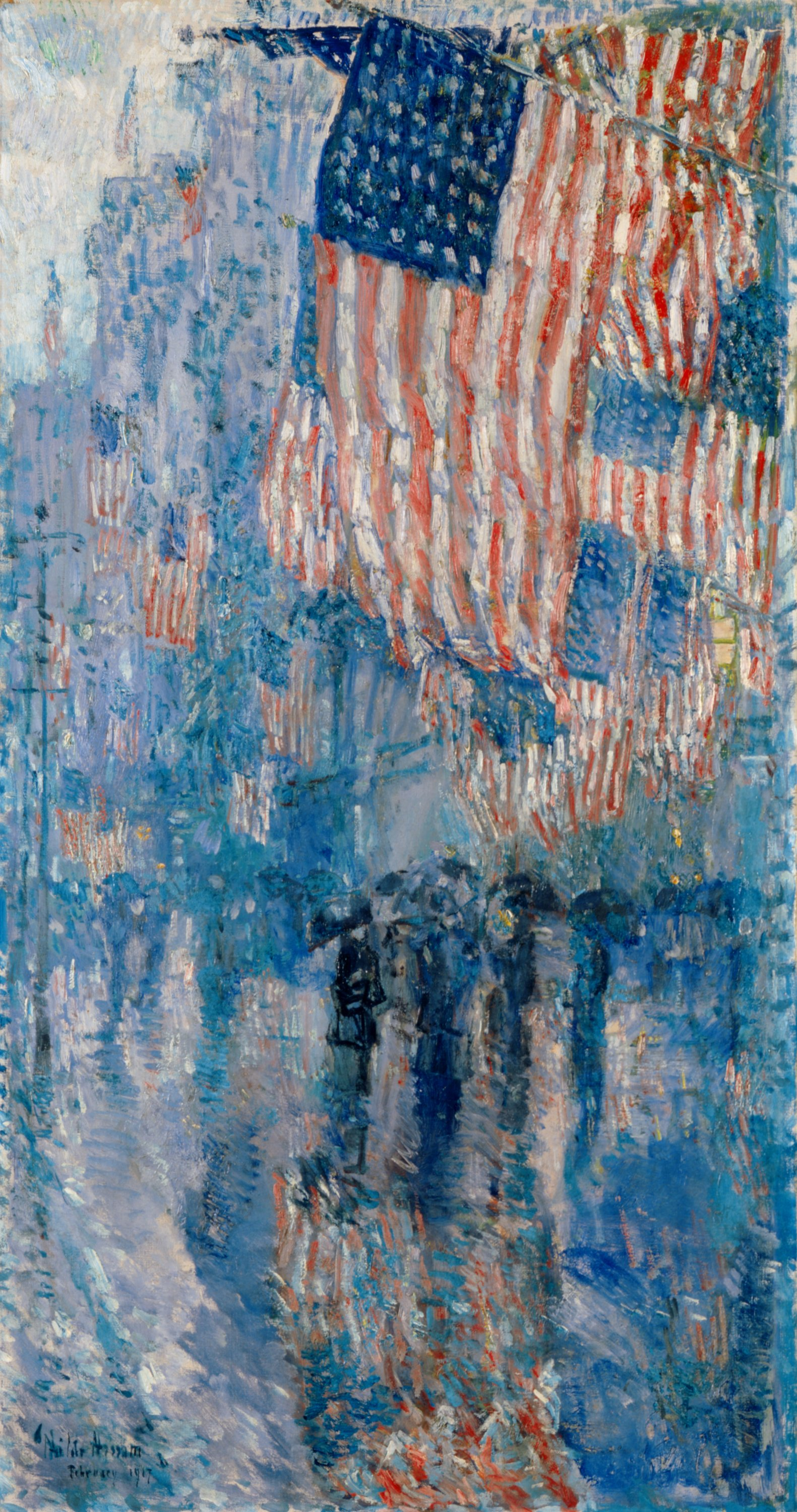
The Avenue in the Rain, 1917

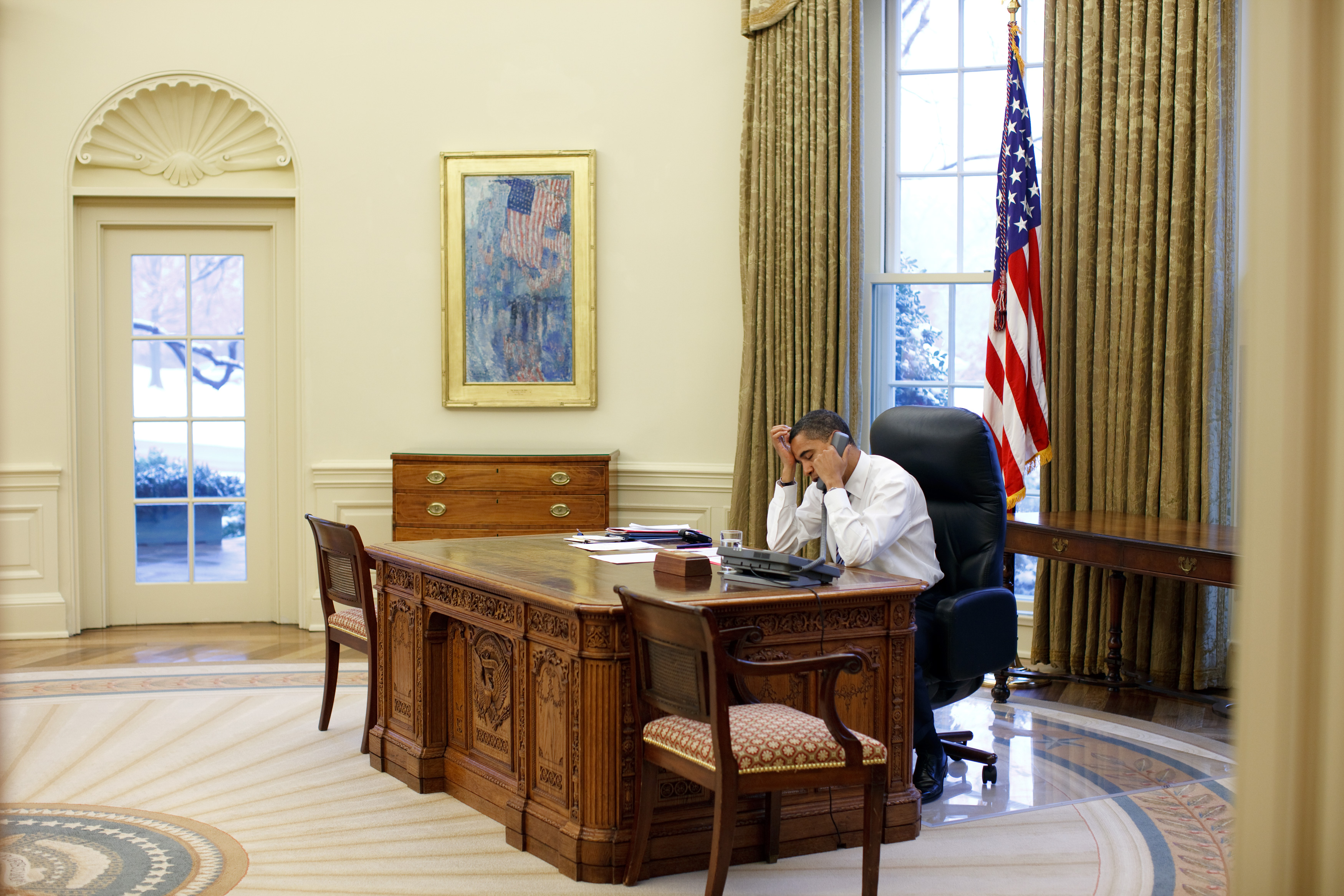
Barack Obama working at the Resolute desk in the Oval Office in 2009, with the painting to his right

The Avenue in the Rain is a 1917 oil painting by the American Impressionist painter Childe Hassam. It depicts Fifth Avenue in New York City in the rain, decorated with U.S. flags. The painting is one of six works by Hassam in the permanent art collection of the White House in Washington, D.C.

== Background and flag series ==
Between 1916 and 1919, Hassam completed as many as thirty paintings showing city streets decorated with flags. Hassam called this series "the flag series."

== Dating and history ==
The Avenue in the Rain dates to February 1917, a time when patriotic fervor was rising and about two months before the United States entered the First World War. The previous month, Germany had extended its unrestricted submarine warfare to neutral ships, including American vessels. The Zimmermann Telegram became public knowledge at the end of February 1917, and the country declared war on Germany on April 6, 1917.

The painting measures 42 by 22.25 inches (106.7 cm × 56.5 cm) and is dominated by tones of blue and red. A large U.S. flag is depicted in the foreground, while a number of smaller flags fill the surrounding space and line Fifth Avenue into the background. Several dark figures in the middle distance hold umbrellas. The flags seem to float in mid-air, hanging from poles that project from unseen buildings. Their images are reflected on the wet street and sidewalk. In painting this work and others in the series, Hassam may have been influenced by two similar pieces by Claude Monet depicting national celebrations in Paris on June 30, 1878.

The painting was donated to the White House in 1963 by Thomas Mellon Evans and hung between the windows in John F. Kennedy's blue-themed President's Bedroom (now a private sitting room, adjacent to the Yellow Oval Room on the second floor). It was in the President's Dining Room for many years and hung in the Oval Office during Bill Clinton's, Barack Obama's and Donald Trump's first term, as well as under Joe Biden's term.

== Replicas ==
A replica of the painting has been featured in multiple fictitious oval offices including the CBS show Madam Secretary and the NBC show The West Wing. It was also located in a hallway in House of Cards.

== Other works by Childe Hassam with flags, 1916-1919 ==
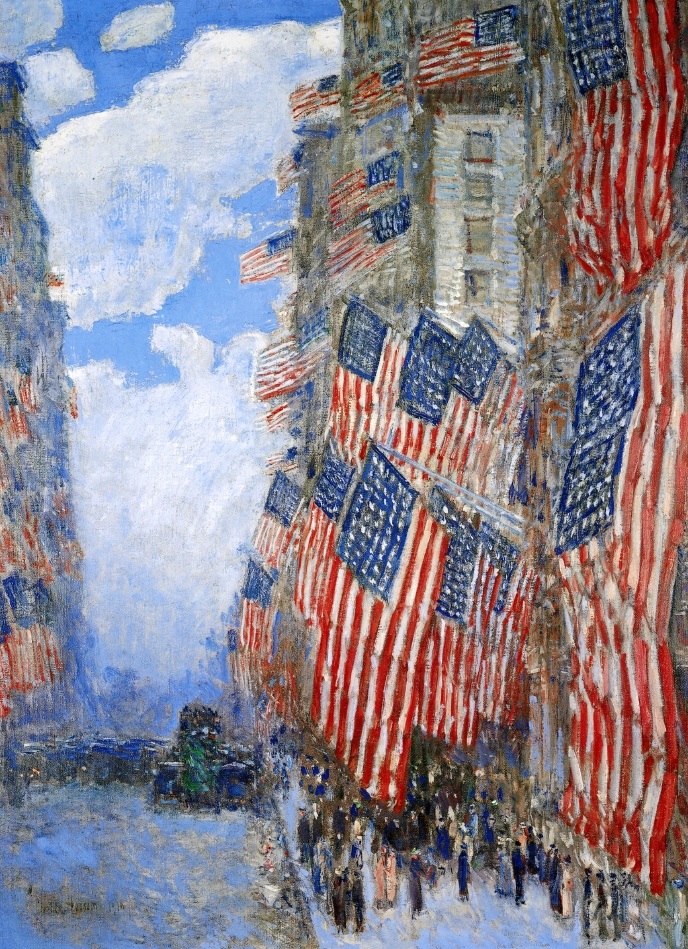
The Fourth of July, 1916

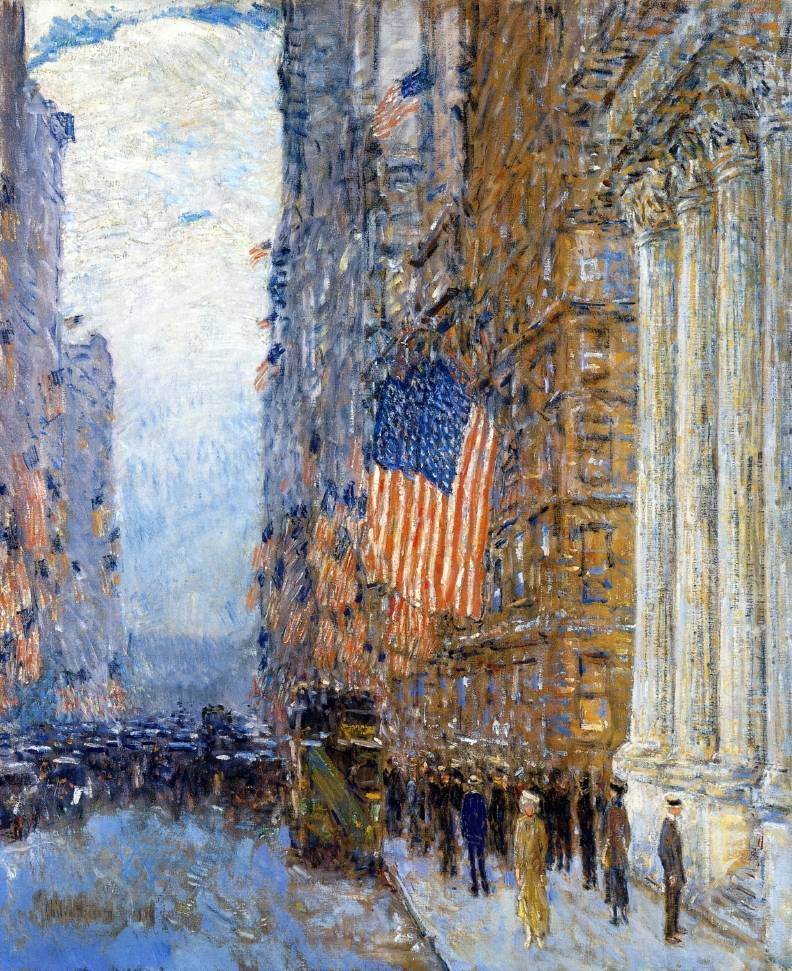
Flags on Waldorf, 1916

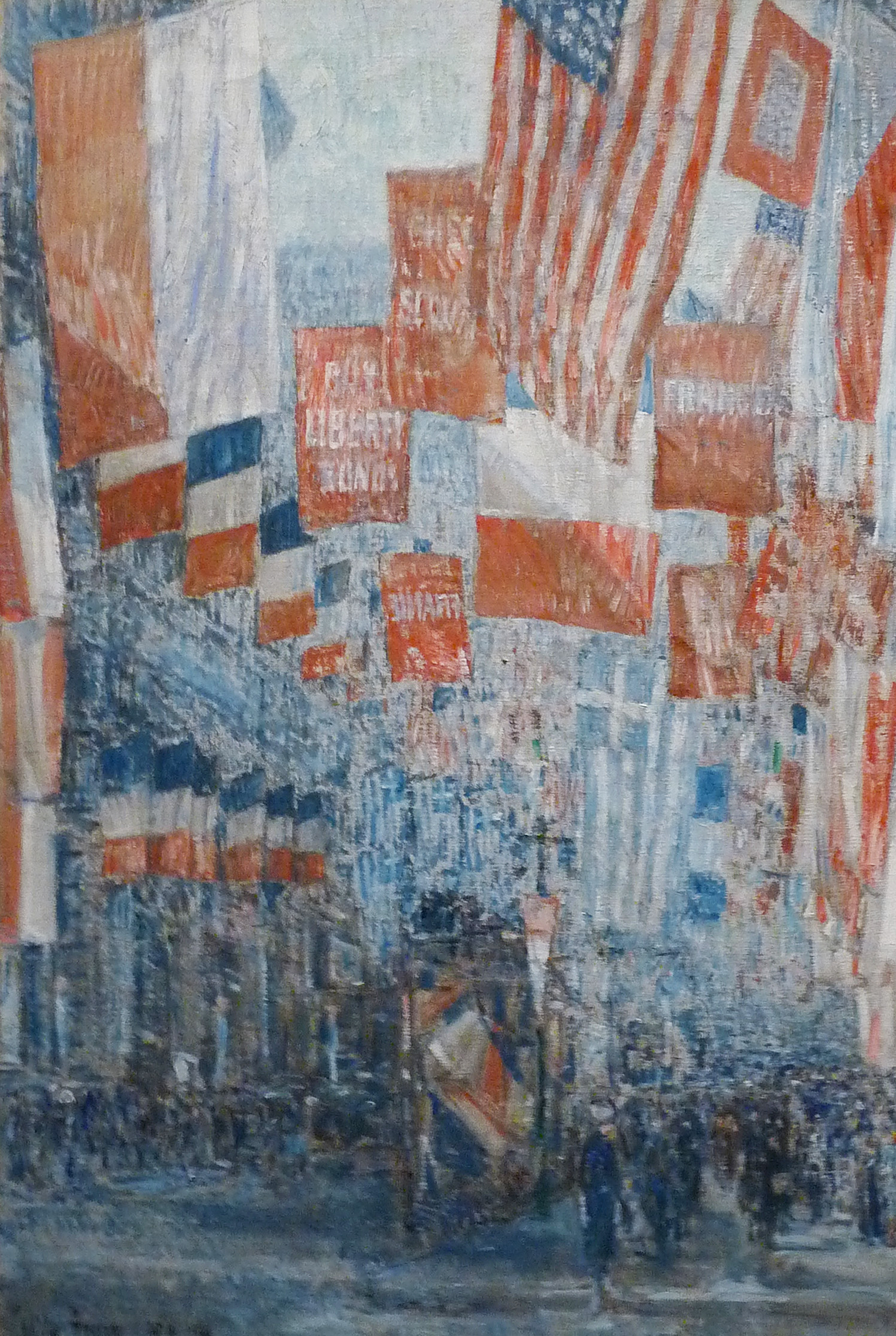
Avenue of the Allies, 1917

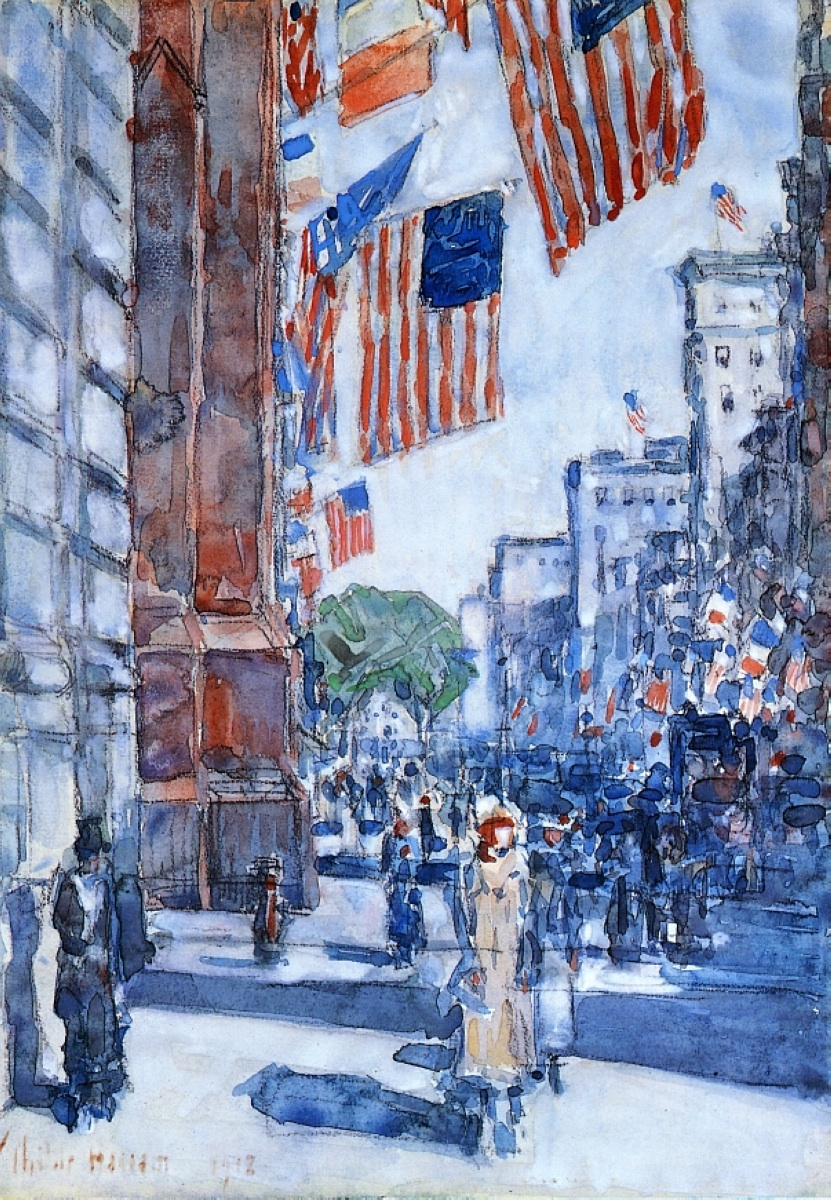
Flags, Fifth Avenue, 1918

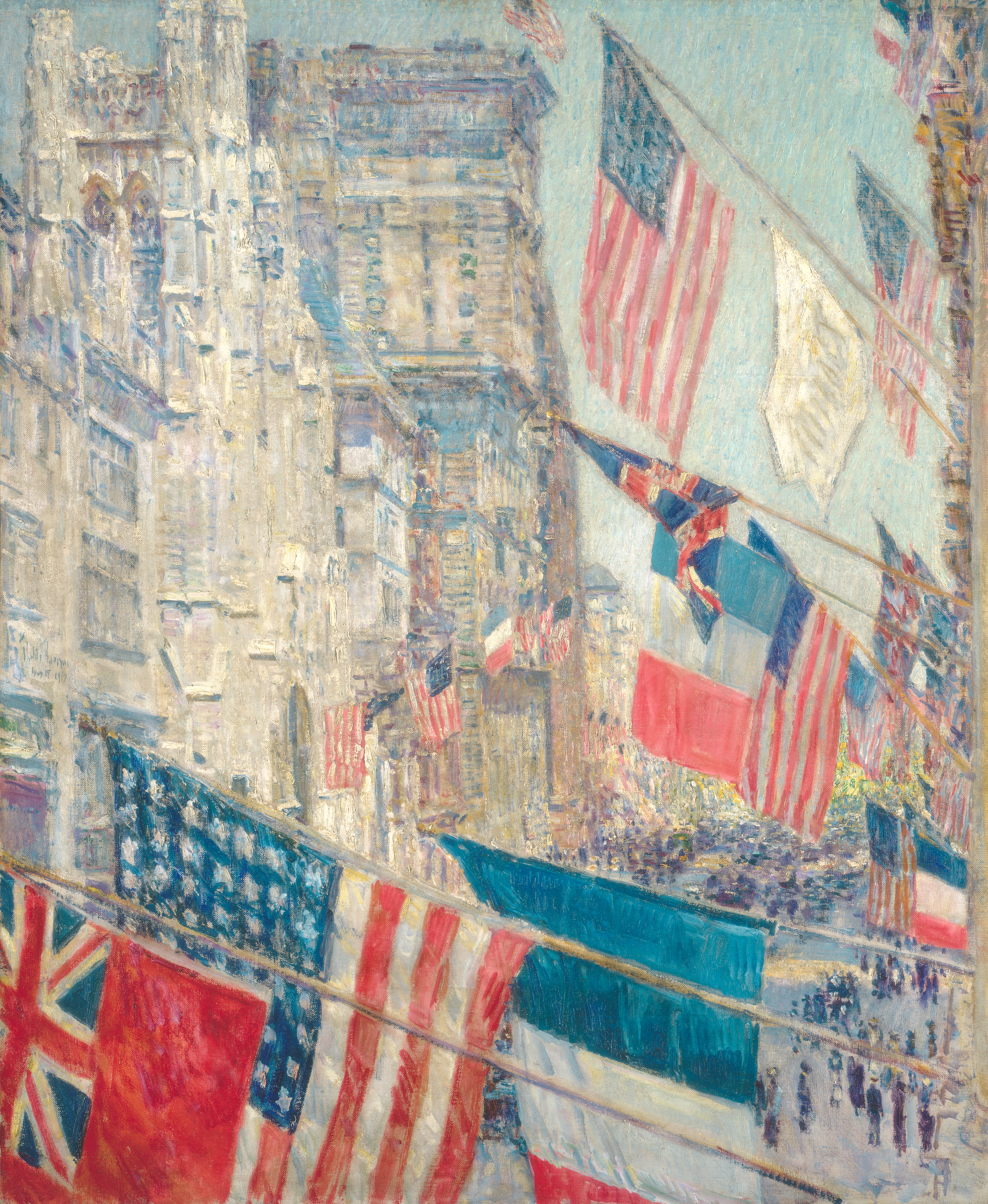
Allies Day, 1918

== Claude Monet ==
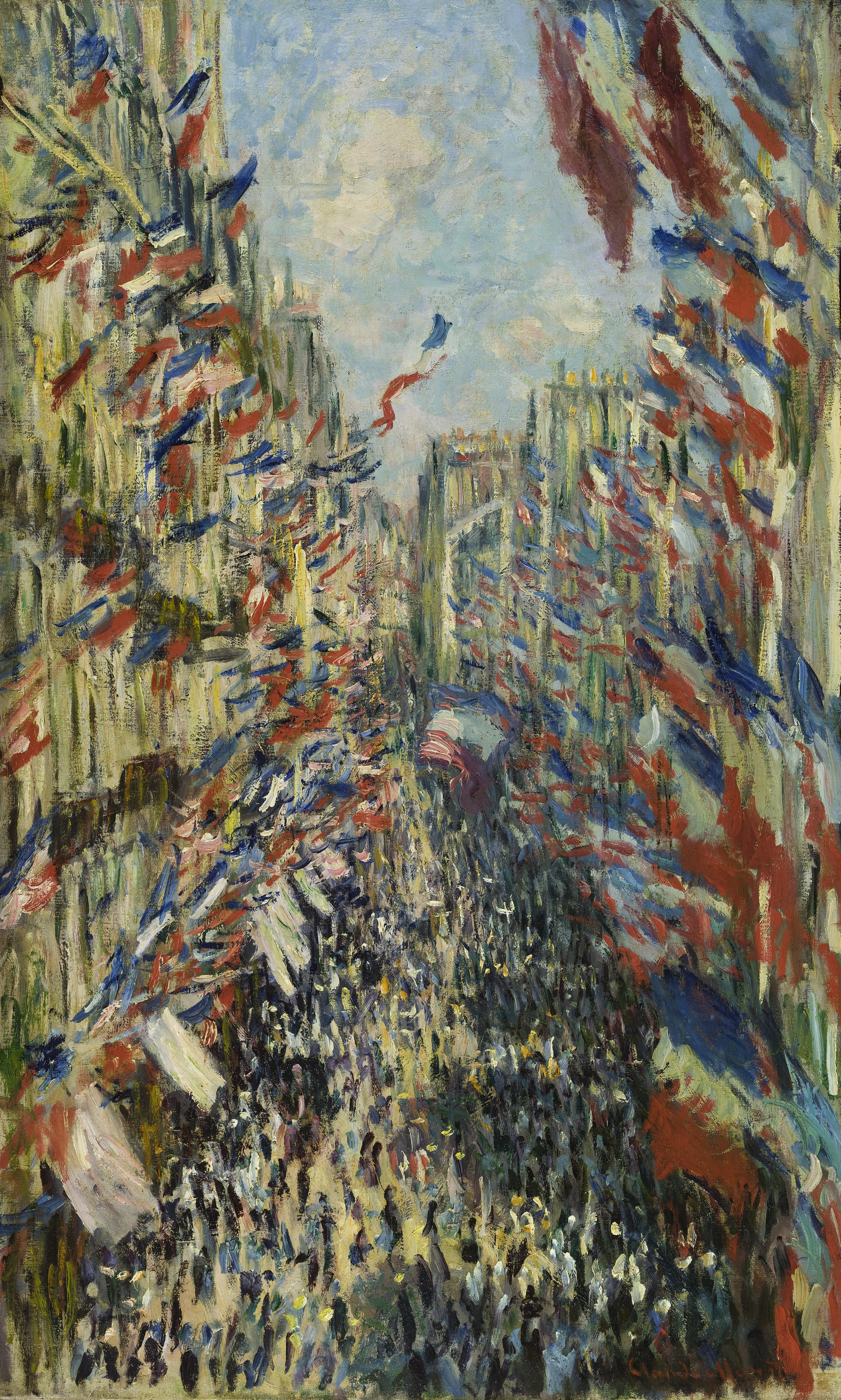
Rue Montorgueil à Paris. Fête du 30 juin 1878

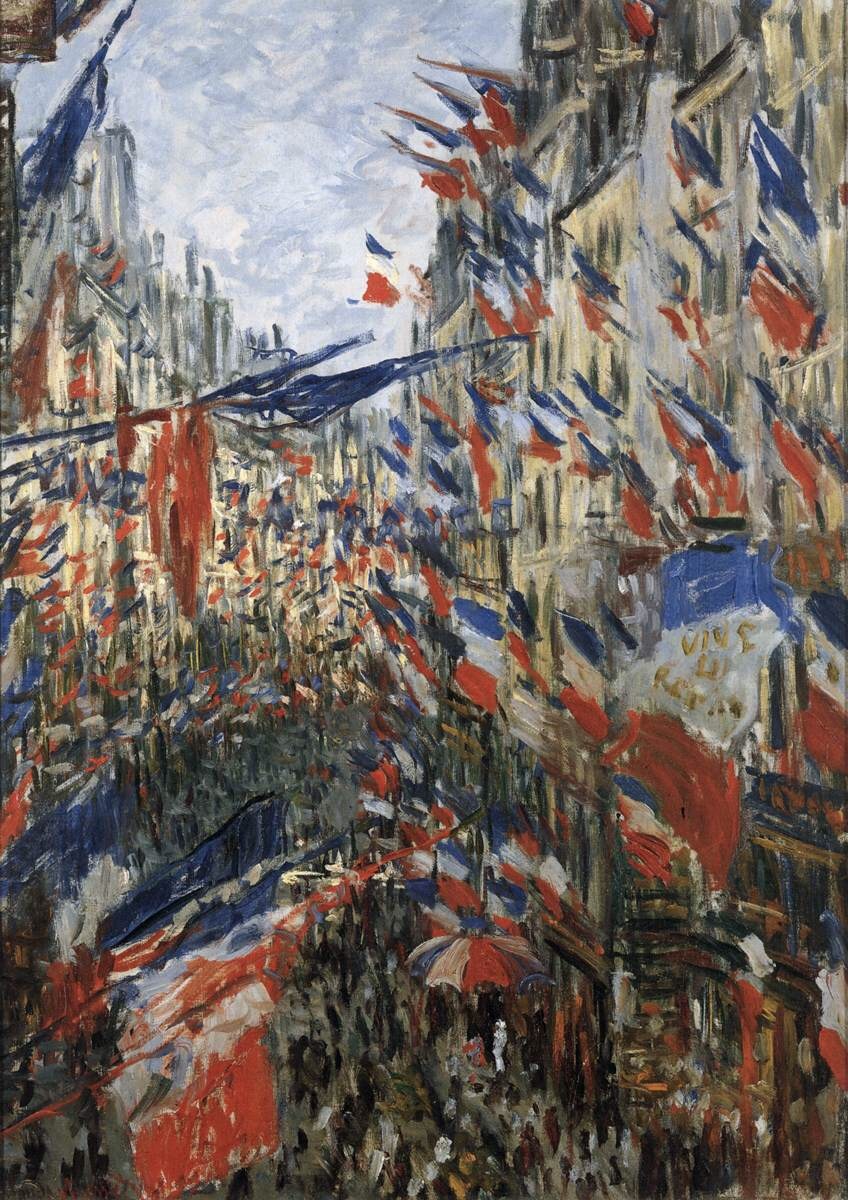
Rue Saint-Denis, fête du 30 juin 1878

== See also ==
- Art in the White House
