= A. H. Davenport and Company =

American furniture manufacturer of the late 19th and early 20th centuries

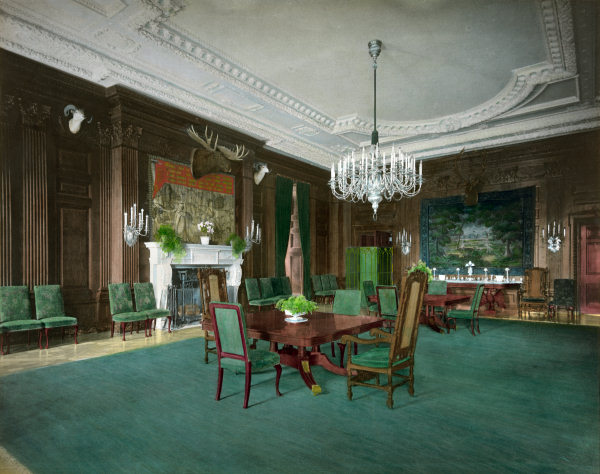
The State Dining Room in 1904. Davenport & Co. made the twin dining tables, 50 side chairs, 6 armchairs and 3 serving tables for the room. Many of the side chairs, now upholstered in ivory, are still in use.

A. H. Davenport and Company was a late 19th-century, early 20th-century American furniture manufacturer, cabinetmaker, and interior decoration firm. Based in Cambridge, Massachusetts, it sold luxury items at its showrooms in Boston and New York City, and produced furniture and interiors for many notable buildings, including The White House. The word "davenport," meaning a boxy sofa or sleeper-sofa, comes from the company.

== History ==
The company was founded by Albert H. Davenport (1845-1905), who began as a bookkeeper at the Boston Furniture Company in 1866, and bought the business about 1880 following the death of its owner. He changed the company's name, and expanded it, opening a showroom in New York City. It produced high-end and custom-made furniture, which it retailed alongside fabrics, wallpaper, hardware, decorative items, and quality goods from a variety of makers. One of Davenport's first big commissions was for 225 pieces of furniture and decorative items for the Iolani Palace in Honolulu, Hawaii.

=== H. H. Richardson ===
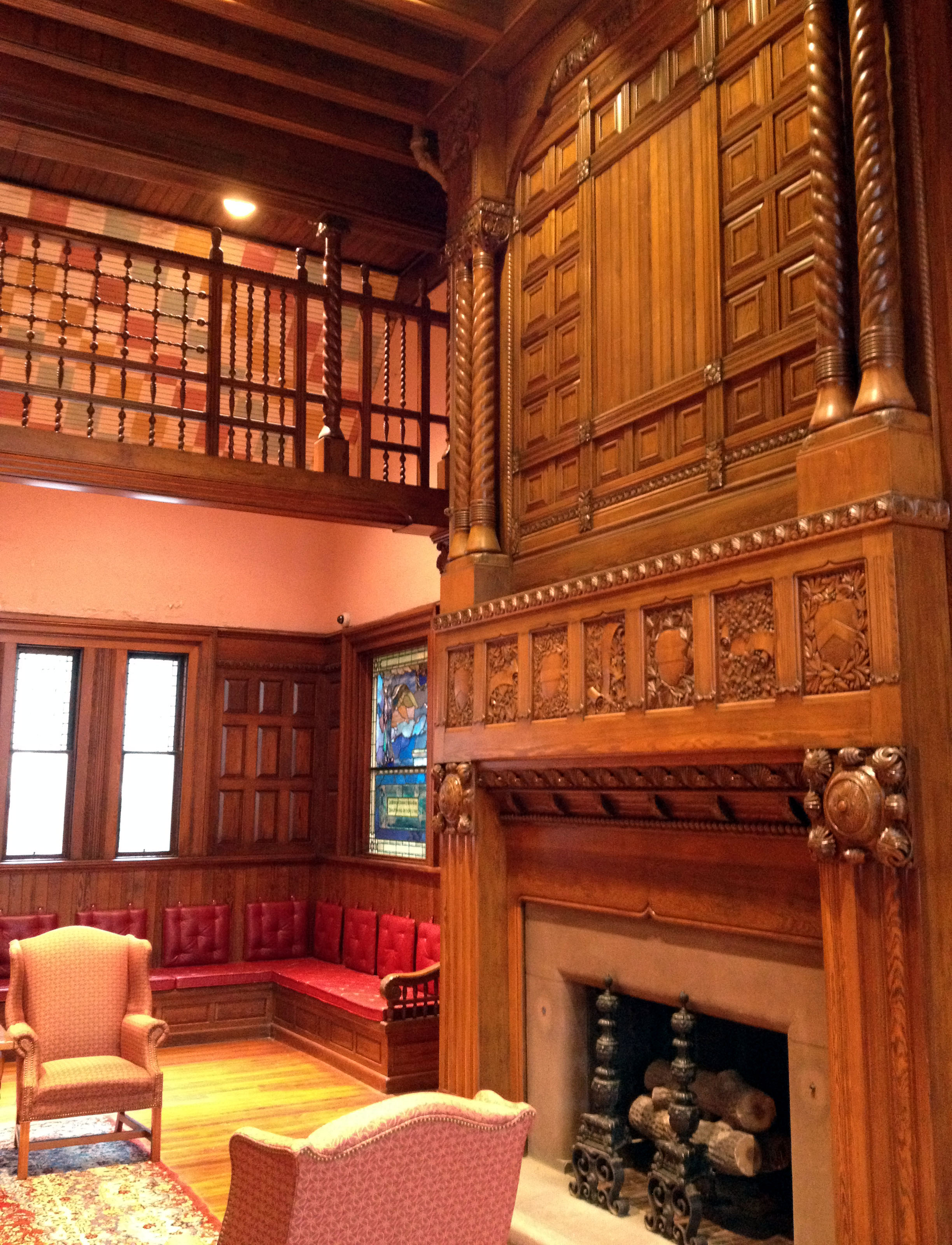
Davenport & Co. executed the interiors for H. H. Richardson's Thomas Crane Public Library (1881), in Quincy, Massachusetts.

The company formed a close relationship with architect H. H. Richardson. Boston Furniture Company–Davenport & Co. likely executed the furniture for his Winn Memorial Library (1879) in Woburn, Massachusetts. Davenport & Co. executed the furniture and interiors for his Thomas Crane Public Library (1881) in Quincy, Massachusetts; his Billings Library (1883) in Burlington, Vermont; and his Converse Memorial Library (1885) in Malden, Massachusetts.

Richardson designed the New York Court of Appeals Room (1883–84), on the third floor of the New York State Capitol in Albany. Davenport & Co. executed its highly carved, Byzantine-Romanesque-style cabinetwork and furniture. Lord Coleridge, Lord Chief Justice of England and Wales, described it as "the finest courtroom in the world." In 1916, Richardson's courtroom was disassembled and relocated to the New York Court of Appeals Building.

In 1885, Davenport hired an architect from Richardson's office, Francis H. Bacon, to be his chief designer. Bacon soon was promoted to vice-president of Davenport & Co.

Richardson died in 1886. The dining room furniture for his John J. Glessner House (1885–87) in Chicago, Illinois, was designed by an associate, Charles Coolidge, and executed by Davenport & Co. Coolidge also designed the desk in the study. The custom-designed case for the Steinway grand piano was made by the company, and is attributed to Bacon.

The Warder Mansion (1885–88) in Washington, D.C., was one of Richardson's final buildings. Davenport & Co. made the furniture, but it is unclear whether design is partially attributable to Richardson, or wholly attributable to Bacon.

=== Other architects ===
Davenport & Co. did work on the James J. Hill House (1891) in Saint Paul, Minnesota. The architects, Peabody and Stearns, were fired before the building's completion and its interiors were completed by Irving & Casson.

The company produced furniture and interiors for architect Charles Brigham's 1895 annex to the Massachusetts State House in Boston.

To the designs of architect Stanford White, the company executed cabinetwork and furnishings for the Villard Houses (1882–84) in New York City; Naumkeag (1885–86) in Stockbridge, MA; Algonquin Club of Boston (1886-1888) in Back Bay, Boston, Massachusetts; Harbor Hill (1899-1902) in Roslyn, New York; and the Payne Whitney House (1902–06) in New York City.

To execute his interior designs for the Frederick William Vanderbilt Mansion (1896–99), in Hyde Park, New York, architect Charles Follen McKim assembled the team of Herter Brothers (floors, walls and ceilings), Davenport & Co. (furniture), and Edward F. Caldwell & Co. (lighting fixtures). McKim would reunite the team a couple years later to renovate The White House.

McKim, Mead and White designed the interiors for the George Eastman House (1905) in Rochester, New York. Davenport & Co. executed the work, including a dining room similar to McKim's State Dining Room.

The company did work on the Henry Clay Frick House (1912–14) in New York City, Thomas Hastings, architect. The Frick Papers include receipts for "furniture and interior woodwork, fabrics and wall coverings, decorative painting."

=== The White House ===
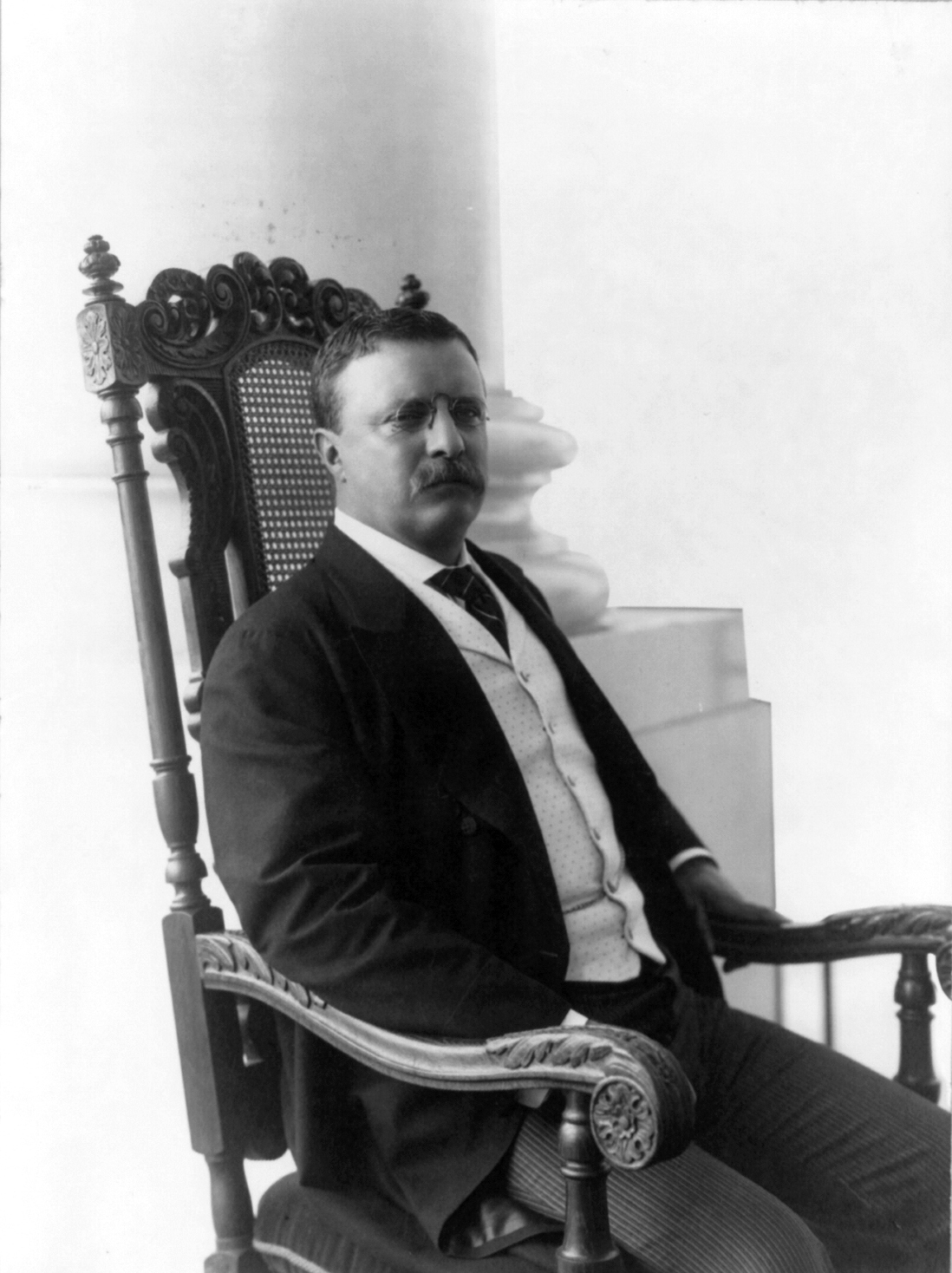
President Theodore Roosevelt seated in a State Dining Room armchair, on the South Porch of the White House, 1903.

Davenport & Co. made a set of sofas and chairs for the Cross Hall during the second Grover Cleveland Administration.

McKim, Mead and White renovated the public rooms of The White House during the Theodore Roosevelt Administration, removing the grand staircase and nearly doubling the size of the State Dining Room. McKim's goal was "to make changes so that the house would not have to be altered again." Herter Brothers executed plasterwork, paneling and cabinetwork for several of the public rooms, helping to turn a stylistic hodge-podge of interiors into a unified Neo-Classical whole. Edward F. Caldwell & Co. made the lighting fixtures, and Leon Marcotte & Co. and Davenport & Co. made the furniture.

Davenport & Co. executed Stanford White's furniture designs for the State Dining Room. These consisted of two neo-Georgian-style dining tables, six William-and-Mary-style armchairs, fifty Queen-Anne-style side chairs, a long serving table supported by carved-eagle pedestals, and two matching console tables. The company executed McKim's Federal-style furniture designs for the Family Dining Room, which consisted of an oval table, armchairs and side chairs, a sideboard, server, mirror, and china cabinet. For the Green Room, the company made a rolled-back sofa, a set of six matching armchairs, and two sets of cane-back side chairs, all painted white. Davenport & Co. also provided furniture for four of the bedrooms, and a bookcase for the President's Study.

First Lady Helen Herron Taft removed the Lincoln Bed from the President's Bedroom, replacing it with Colonial-Revival pieces made by Davenport & Co.

==== Oval Office ====
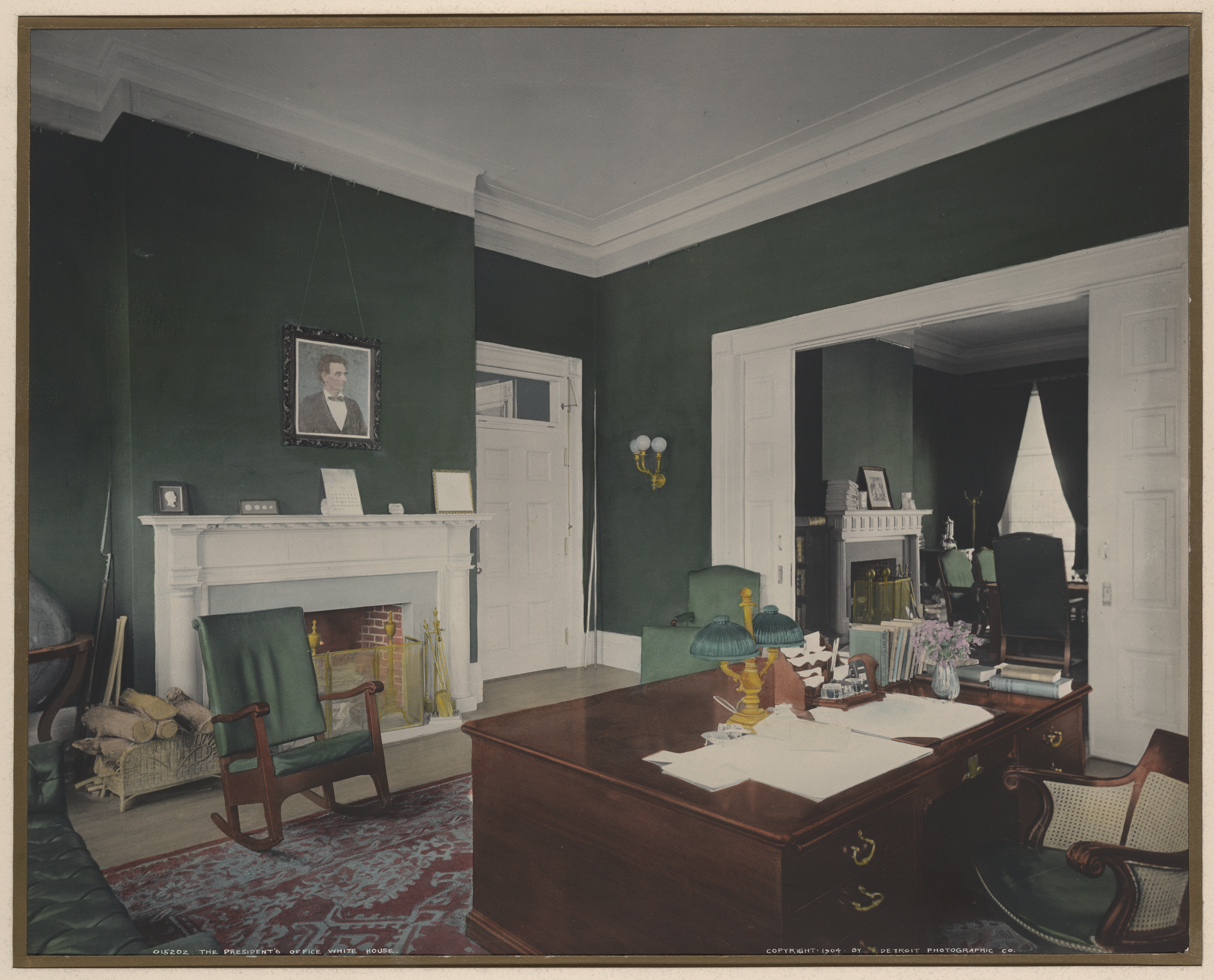
Theodore Roosevelt desk in the Executive Office, 1904.

Davenport & Co. executed McKim's furniture designs for the Executive Office and Cabinet Room. The pieces included the Theodore Roosevelt desk, the Cabinet Room's table and chairs, dark-green leather sofas with oversized brass tacks, and matching leather armchairs and sidechairs.

President William Howard Taft moved the desk, sofas and chairs into the first Oval Office, which was completed in 1909. The furniture remained there for more than twenty years and was used by five presidents, until a December 24, 1929, fire. President Herbert Hoover rebuilt the Taft Oval Office, but accepted the donation of a new desk from a Michigan trade association.

The White House bought a set of diminutive, cane-back mahogany armchairs from Davenport & Co. in 1902. Nearly-identical chairs, but with leather backs, had been made by the company for the Massachusetts State House. President Hoover installed six of the cane-back chairs his rebuilt Oval Office in 1930. President Franklin D. Roosevelt moved them into the modern Oval Office, completed 1934, where they have been used by every president since. The chairs are currently in use in the Oval Office, including a pair flanking the Resolute Desk.

The Theodore Roosevelt desk survived the 1929 fire, and was used in the modern Oval Office by Presidents Harry S. Truman and Dwight D. Eisenhower. Recently, the desk was used by Vice-president Richard Cheney in his ceremonial office in the Eisenhower Executive Office Building.

== Personal ==
Albert Henry Davenport (December 5, 1845, Malden, Massachusetts – June 22, 1905, Squirrel Island, Maine) married Ella Louise Stetson (1851-1925), and they had two children: Fred Albert Davenport (1873-1928) and Alice May Davenport (1878-1944). Neither child married or had children.

Davenport built a mansion for his family in Malden, Massachusetts, in 1892. His daughter occupied it until her death, and bequeathed it to a non-profit organization to operate it as a residence for the elderly. The Davenport Memorial Home retains most of its original furniture and fixtures.

== Legacy ==
Davenport and his family vacationed on Squirrel Island, Maine. He donated the island's public library and its first 4,000 books.

Following Albert H. Davenport's 1905 death, Francis H. Bacon attempted to buy Davenport & Co., but was unsuccessful. Bacon established his own furniture and interior design business in 1908.

Irving & Casson merged with Davenport & Co. about 1914, and continued in business until 1974. A collection of the joint-company's designs is at The Winterthur Library.

Interiors by A. H. Davenport and Company survive in most of the buildings named above. Furniture by A. H. Davenport and Company is in the collection of the White House, the Smithsonian Institution, Historic New England, the Museum of Fine Arts, Boston, the Art Institute of Chicago, the Carnegie Museum of Art, the Brooklyn Museum, the Metropolitan Museum of Art, and St. Patrick's Cathedral in New York City.

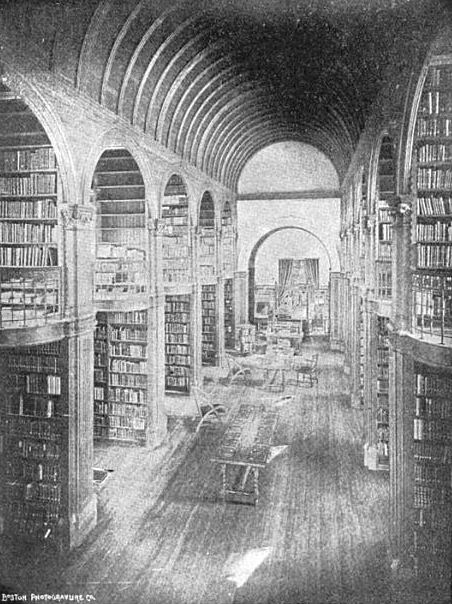
Interior of Winn Memorial Library (1879), Woburn, Massachusetts.

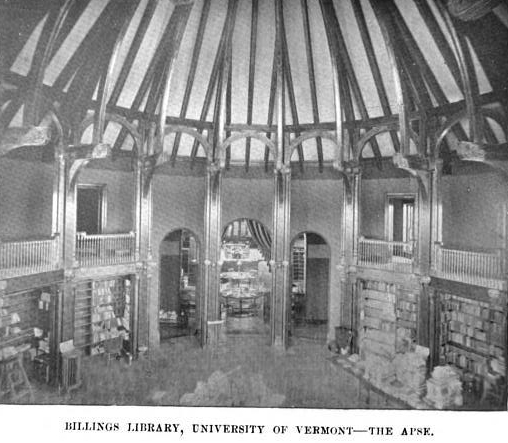
Interior of Billings Library (1883), Burlington, Vermont.

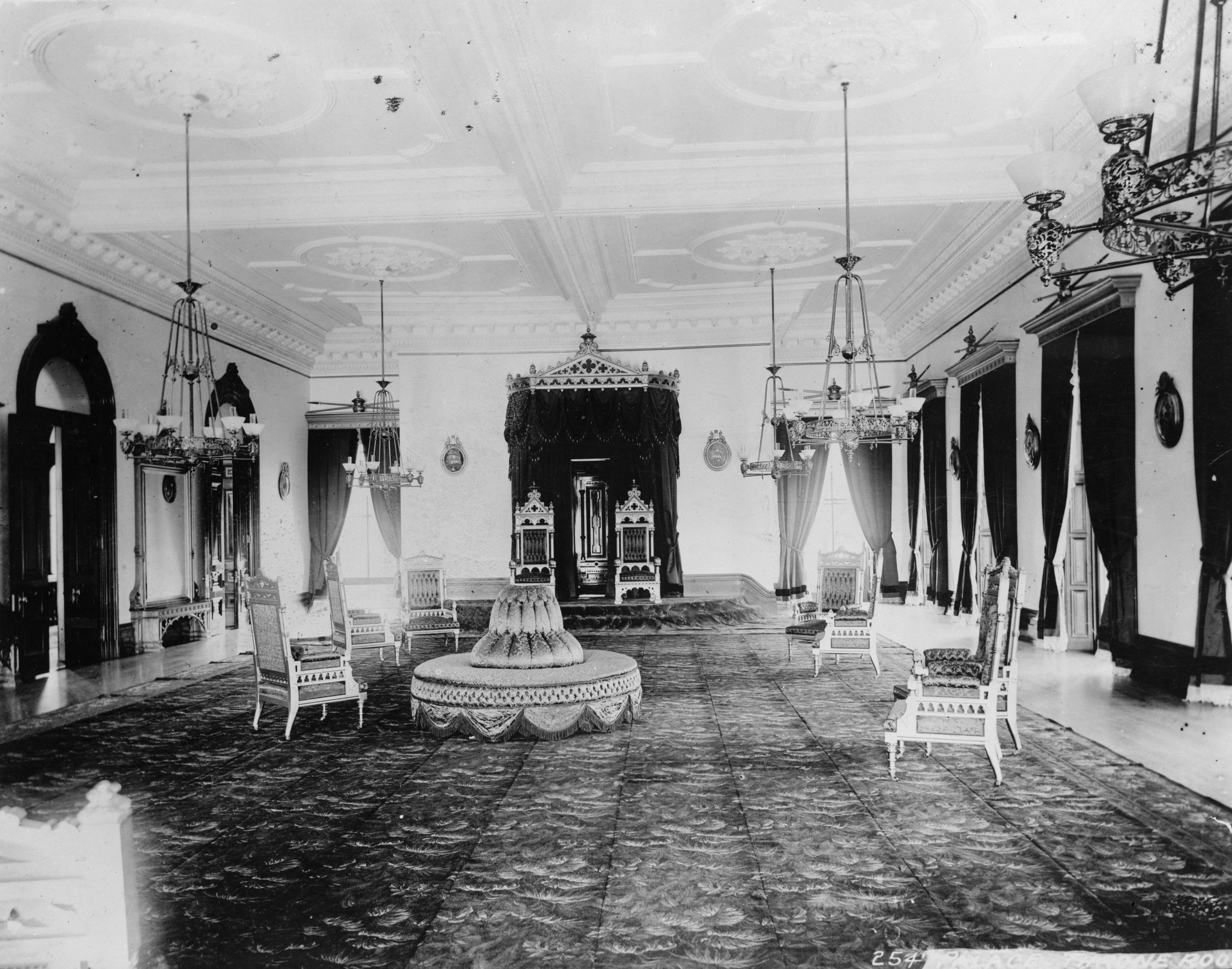
Throne Room of the Iolani Palace, c. 1887.

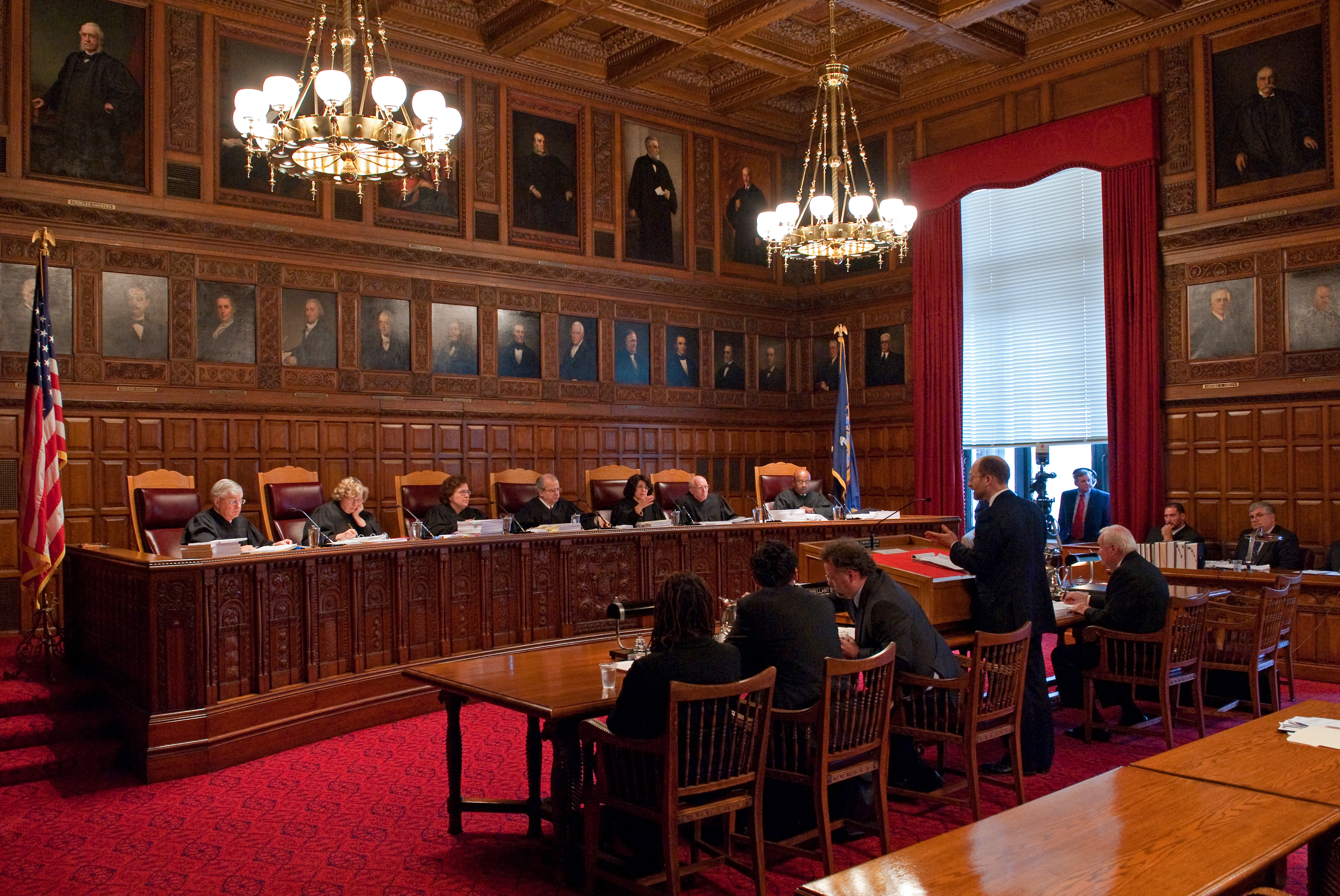
New York Court of Appeals Room in 2009.

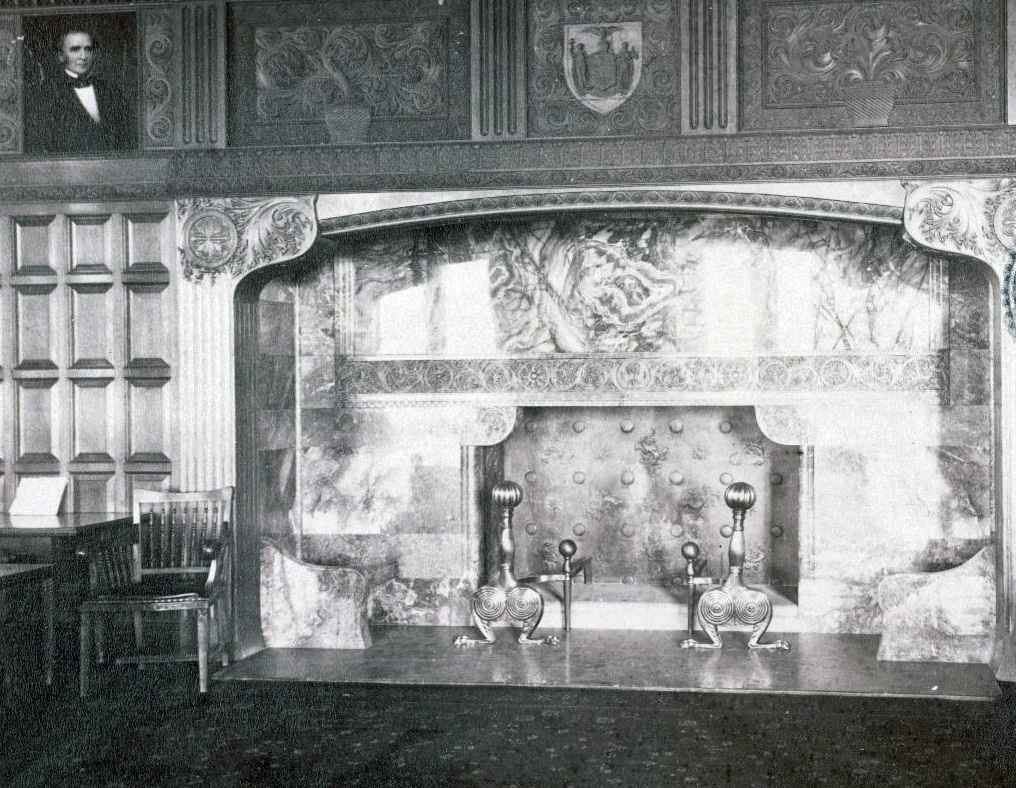
Fireplace, New York Court of Appeals Room, before its 1916 relocation.

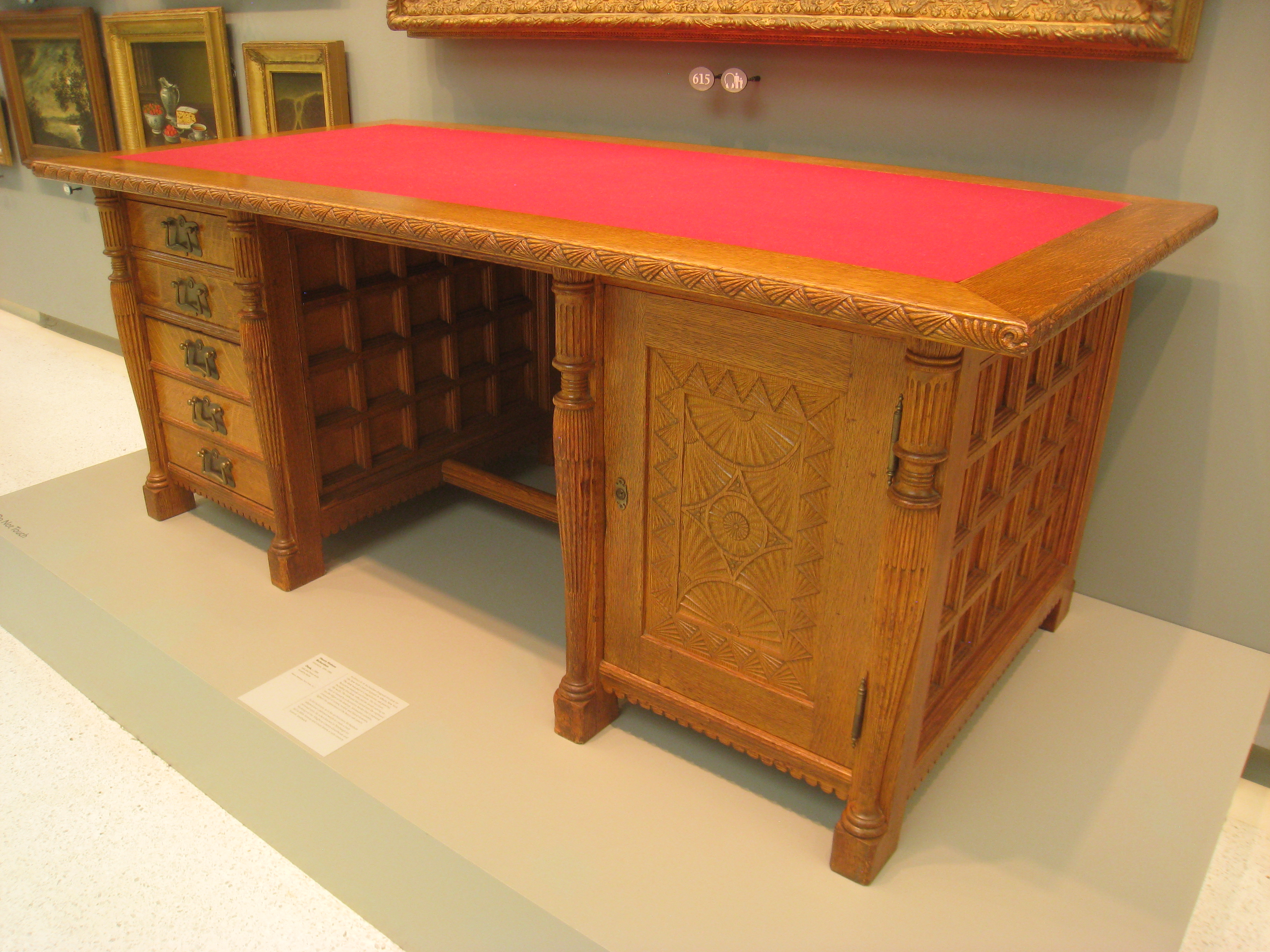
Pedestal desk (c. 1884), from New York Court of Appeals Room.

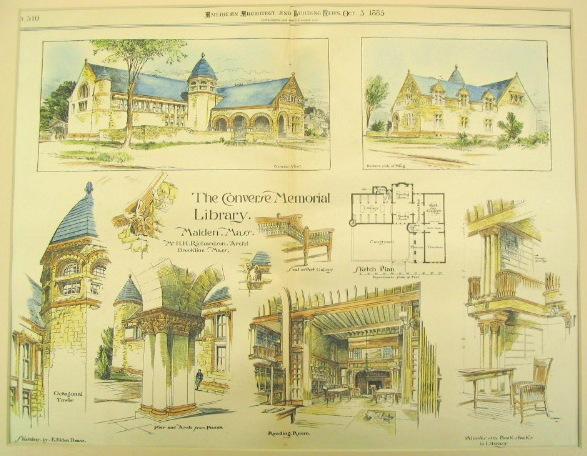
Converse Memorial Library (1885), Malden, Massachusetts.

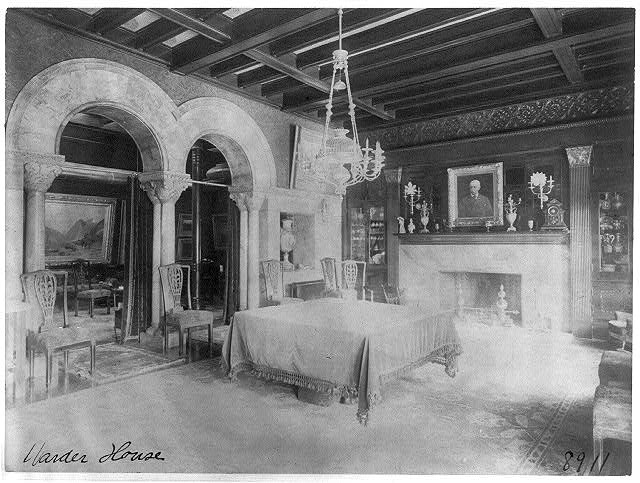
Warder Mansion dining room, c. 1890. Francis H. Bacon designed the Colonial-Revival furniture.

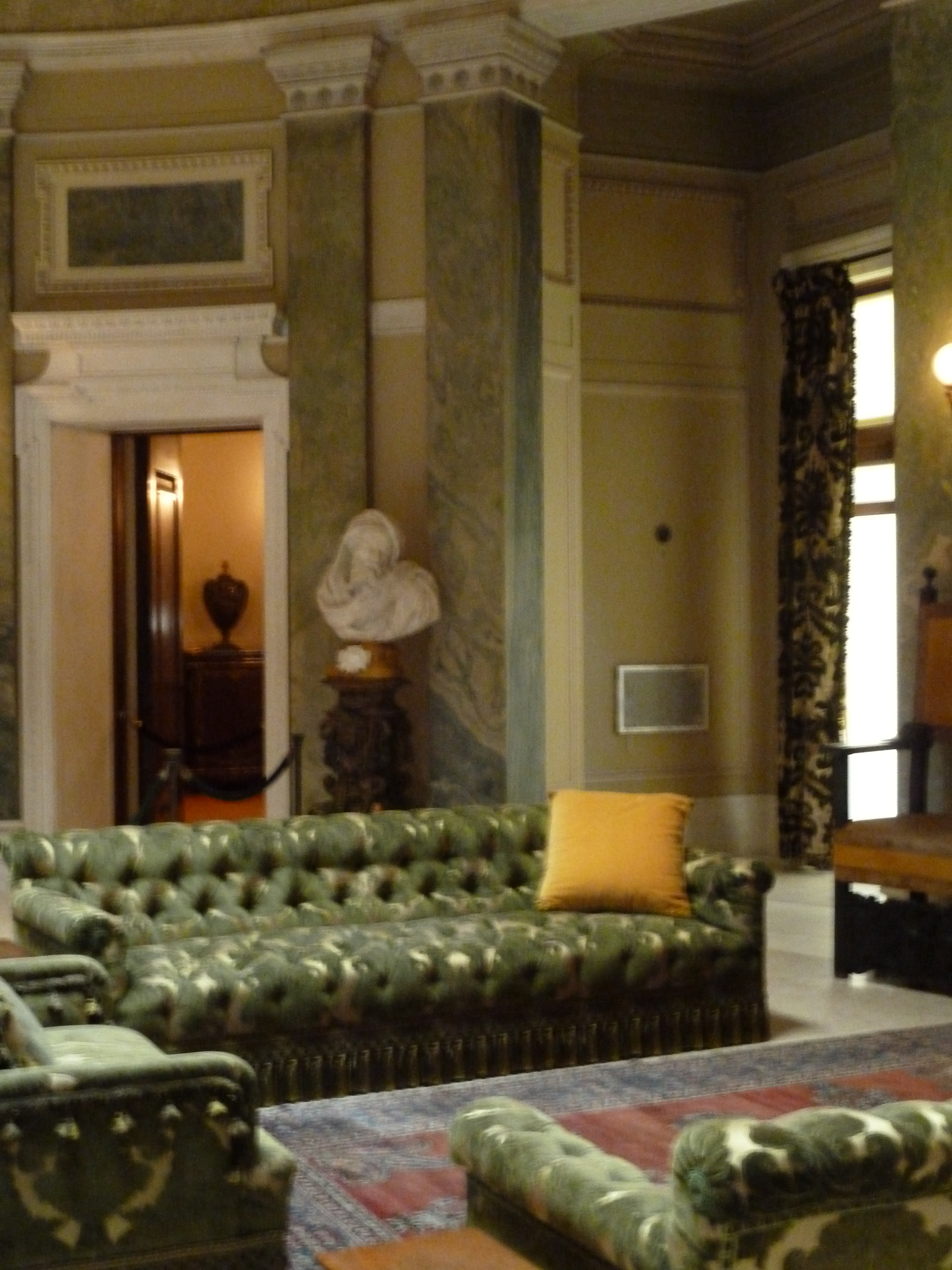
Three sofas (c. 1899), Vanderbilt Mansion National Historic Site, Hyde Park, New York.

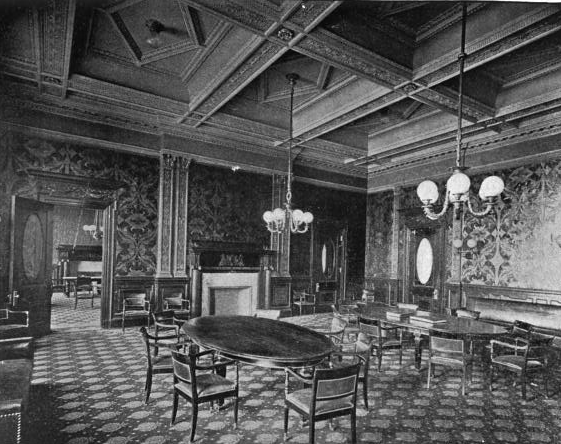
Reading Room, Massachusetts State House Annex, c. 1908.

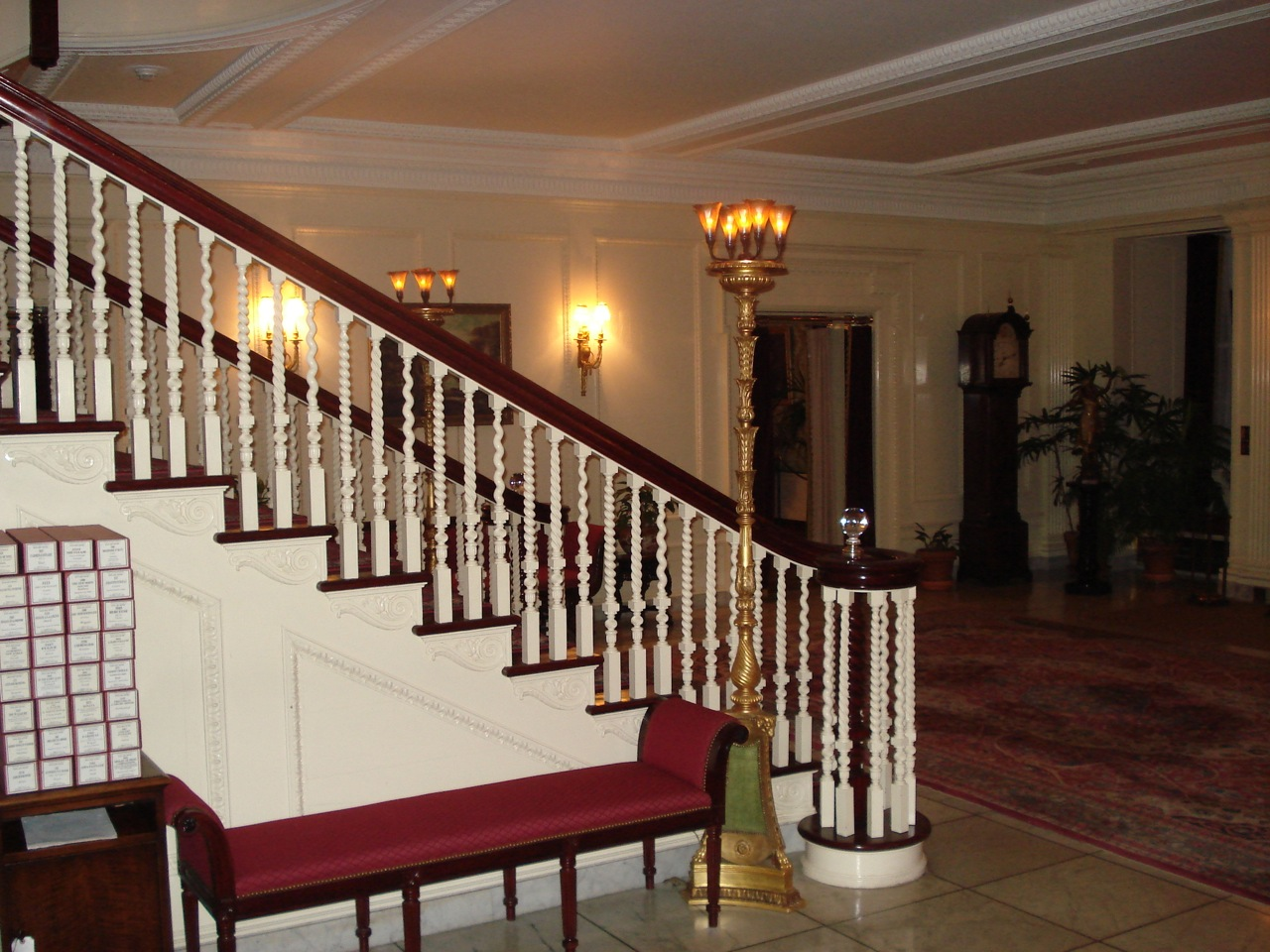
Interior of George Eastman House (1905), Rochester, New York.

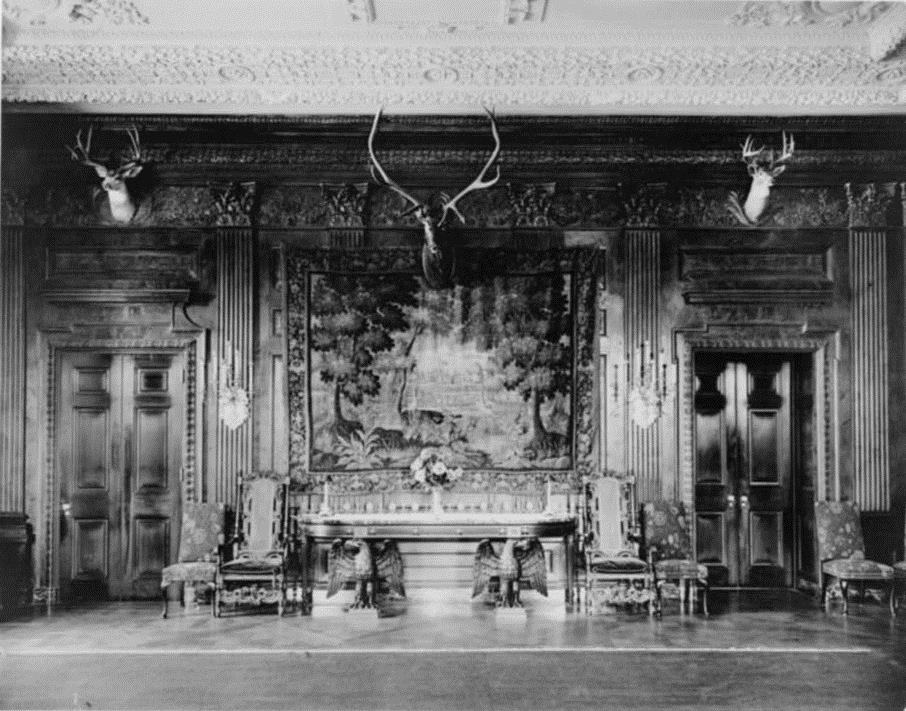
North wall of the State Dining Room, c. 1903.

The Green Room in 1904.

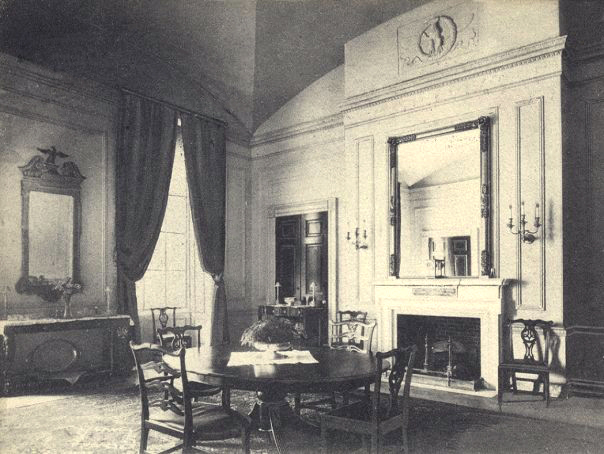
The Family Dining Room in 1907.

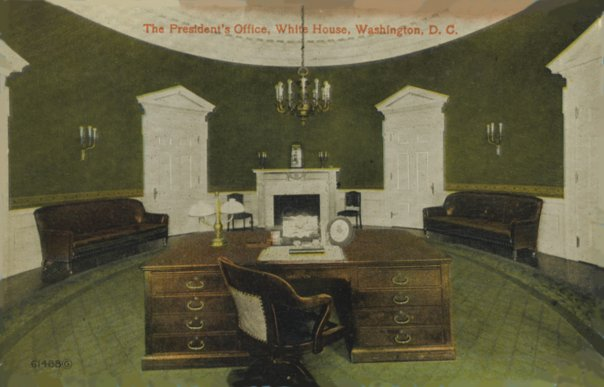
Theodore Roosevelt desk in the Taft Oval Office, 1909.

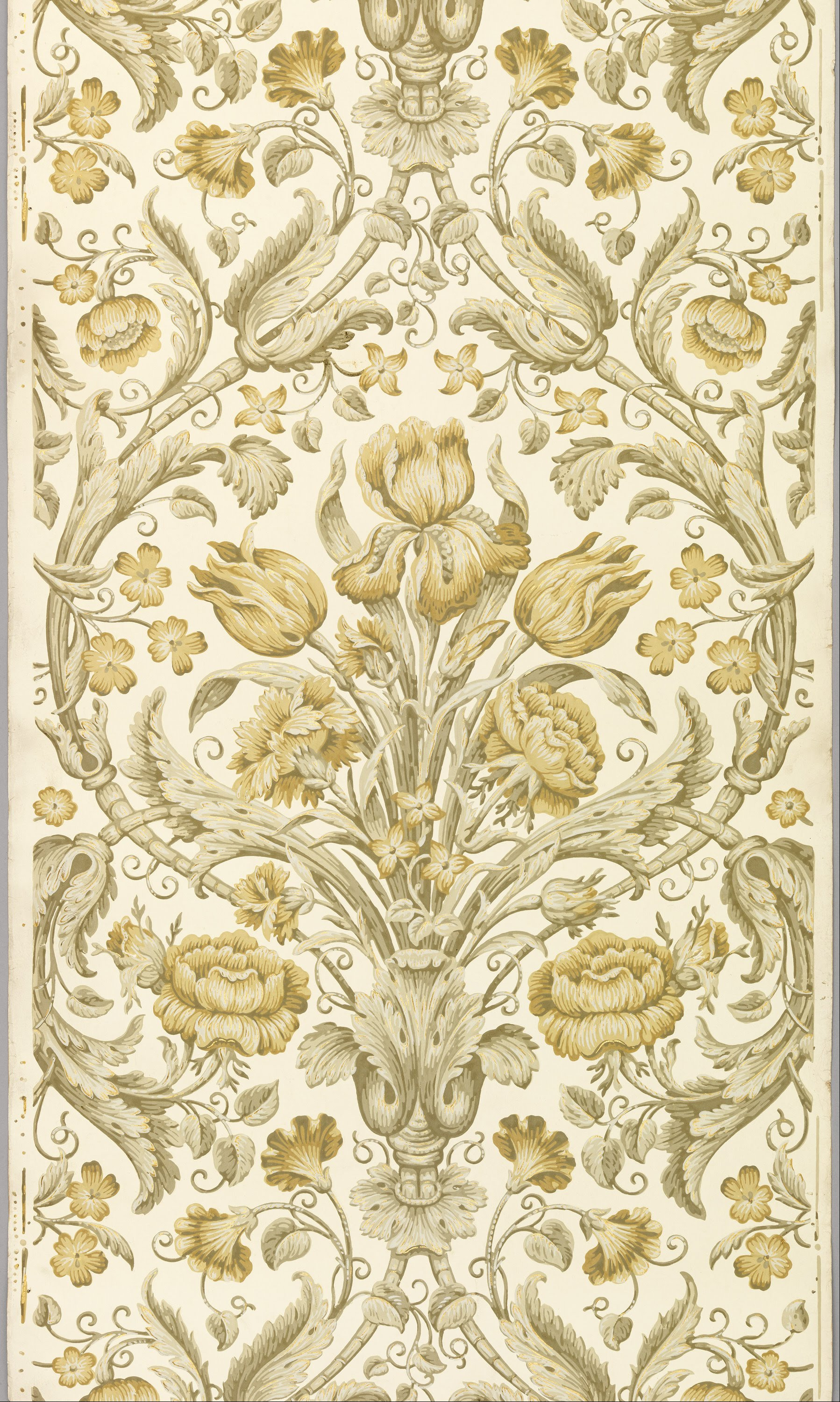
Wallpaper sold by Davenport & Co.

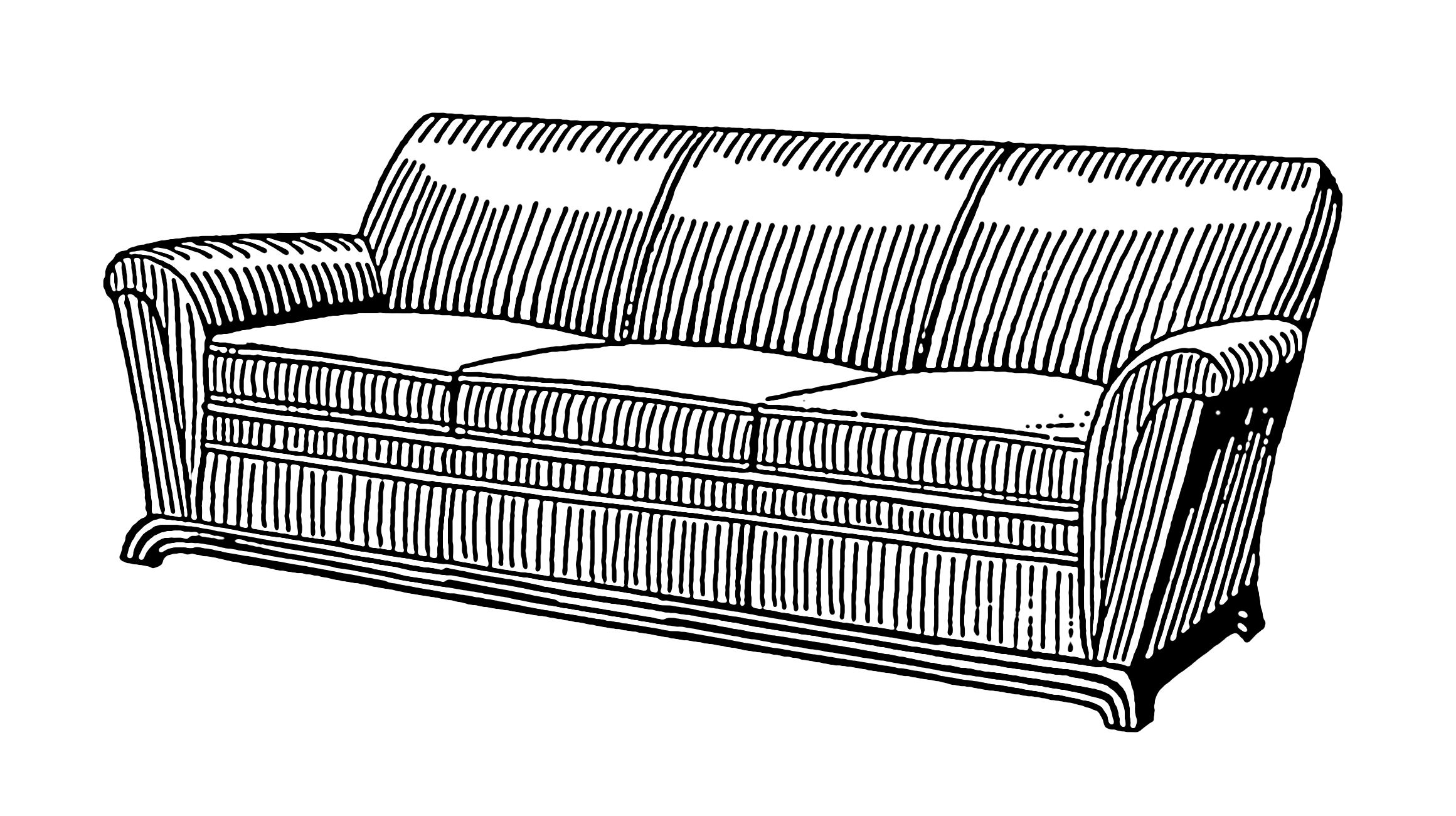
"Davenport" sofa.

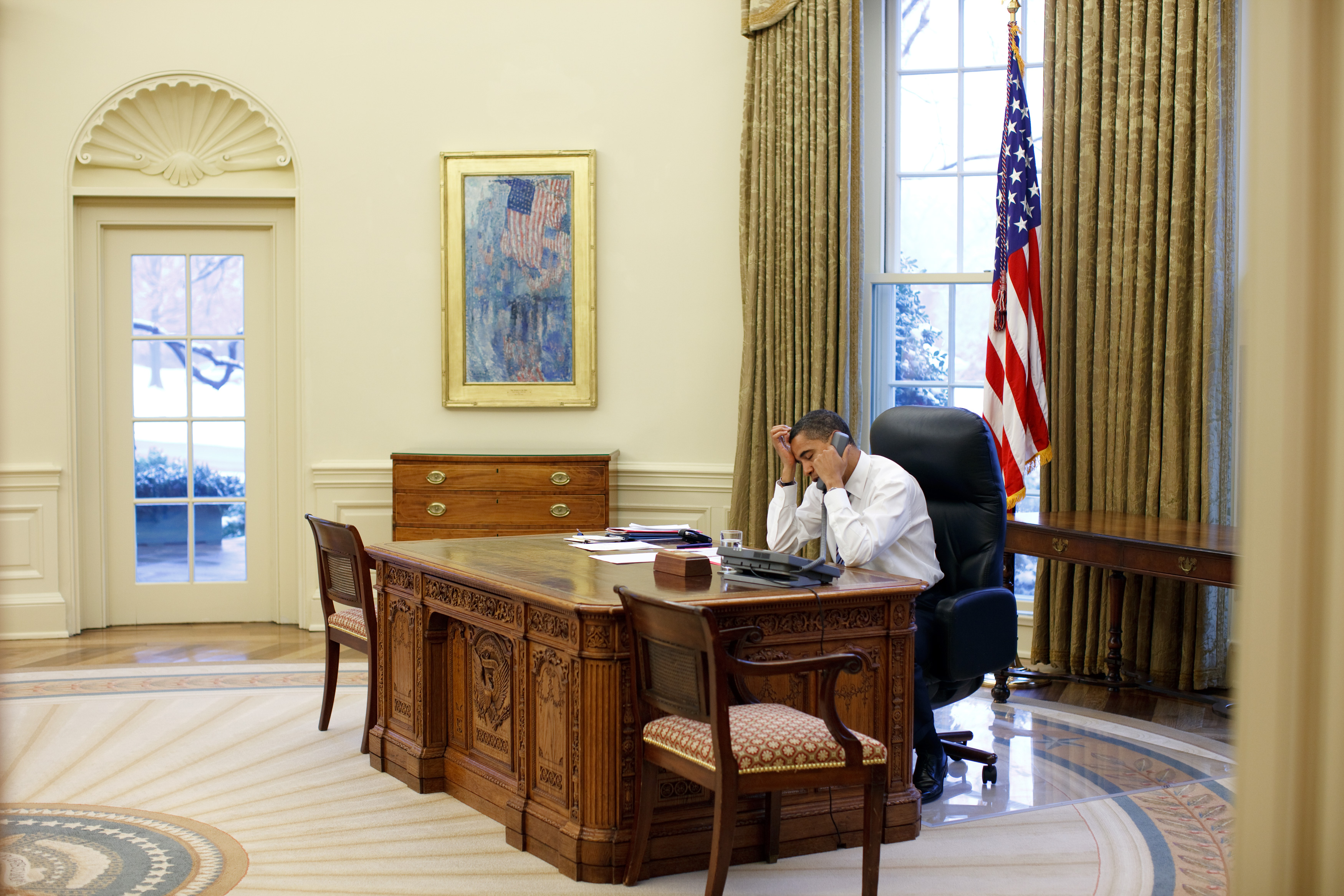
The cane-back armchairs in the Oval Office were made by Davenport & Co. in 1902.

== Sources ==
- "A. H. Davenport and Company, 1880-1908," in In Pursuit of Beauty: Americans and the Aesthetic Movement (Metropolitan Museum of Art, 1986), p. 418.
- Keith Bakker, "H. H. Richardson’s Furnishings," in The Makers of Trinity Church in the City of Boston (University of Massachusetts Press, 2004), pp. 83–103.
- Anne Farnum, "A. H. Davenport and Company, Boston Furniture Makers," in The Magazine Antiques, v. 109 (May, 1976), pp. 1048–55.
- Anne Farnam, "H. H. Richardson and A. H. Davenport: Architecture and Furniture as Big Business in America’s Gilded Age," in Tools and Technologies: America’s Wooden Age, (Robert Hull Fleming Museum, University of Vermont, 1979), pp. 80–92.
- Anne Farnam, "The A. H. Davenport Company of Boston." in Upholstery in America and Europe: from the Seventeenth Century to World War I (W. W. Norton & Company, 1987), pp. 231–38.
- Betty C. Monkman, The White House: Its Historic Furnishings and First Families (Abbeville Press, 2000). ISBN 0-7892-0624-2.
- Richard H. Randall Jr., The Furniture of H. H. Richardson (Museum of Fine Arts, Boston, 1962).
- William Seale, The President's House: A History (White House Historical Association, 1986).
