= Irving and Casson =

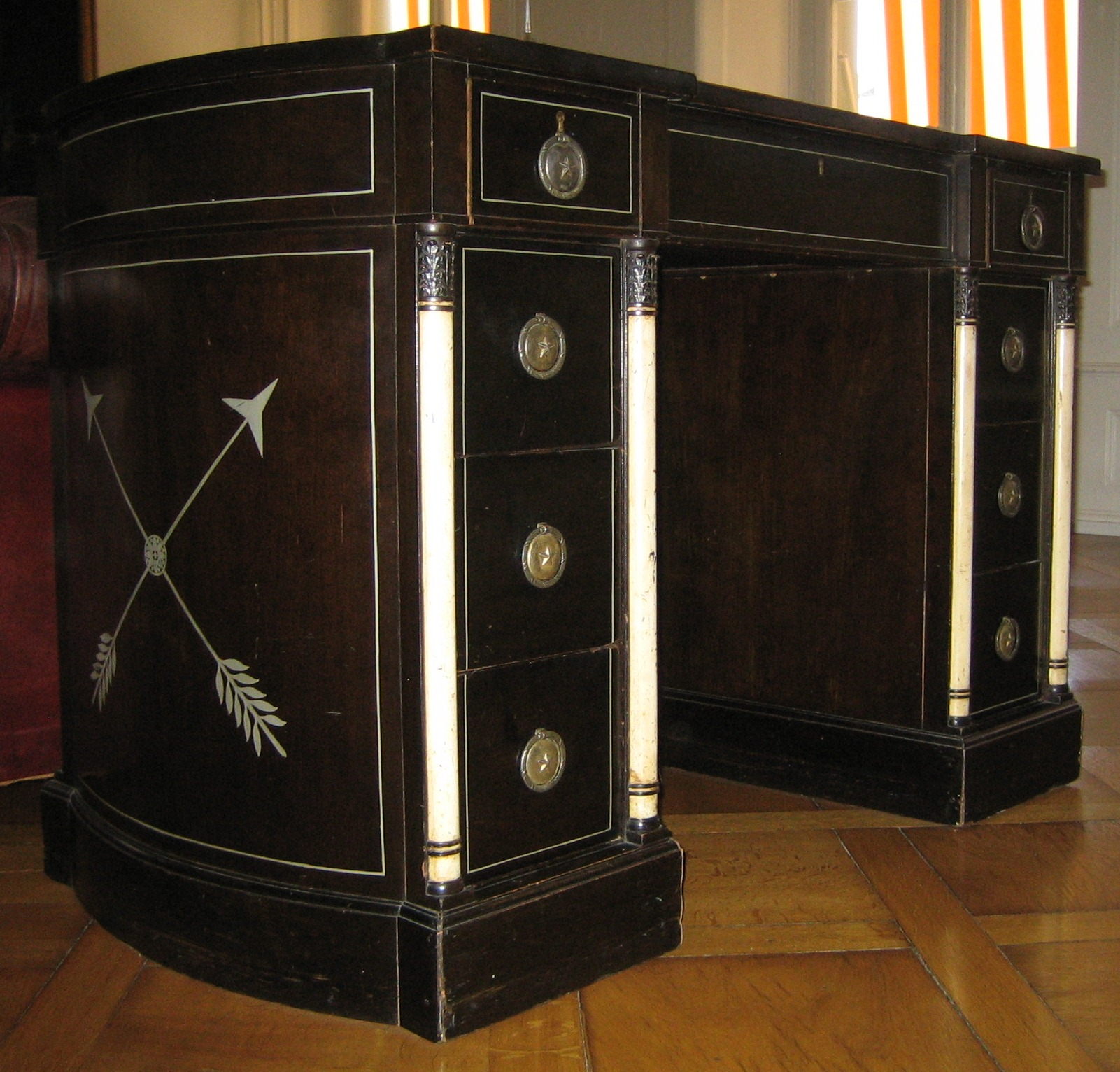
Irving & Casson–A. H. Davenport Co.: Pedestal desk in the French Empire style. Company badge with inscription on the underside: Irving & Casson–A. H. Davenport Co. Boston (Copley Sq.) NEW YORK (Fifth Avenue) and the numeral punch: 2530.

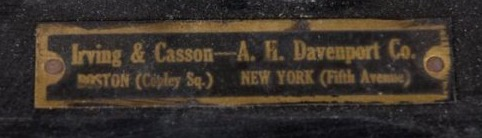
Company badge of Irving & Casson.

Irving & Casson was a Boston, Massachusetts, firm of interior designers and furniture makers, founded in 1875.

Its specialty was interior woodwork and mantels, but it also made furniture, primarily in the styles of the 17th, 18th and early 19th centuries. In 1914 or 1916, the firm merged with A. H. Davenport Company, a furniture company also located in Boston (both had factories in East Cambridge). After the merger, the company executed a number of commissions for Gothic Revival churches, including the chapels at Duke University and the University of Pittsburgh. The company’s last major design commission was for the interiors for the United Nations Headquarters in New York City, executed in the 1950s. Irving & Casson–A. H. Davenport Co. went out of business in 1974.
