= President's Bedroom =

Bedroom in the White House

Coordinates: 38.897696°N 77.036583°W

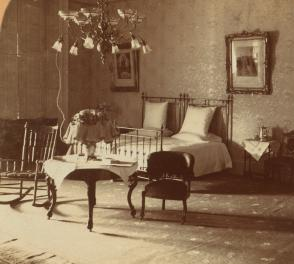
Photograph of the room from the late 19th or early 20th century

The President's Bedroom is a second floor bedroom in the White House. The bedroom makes up the White House master suite along with the adjacent sitting room and the smaller dressing room, all located in the southwest corner. Prior to the Ford administration it was common for the president and first lady to have separate bedrooms. Until then, this room was used mostly as the first lady's bedroom; however, it was the sleeping quarters for President Abraham Lincoln.

The dressing room in the southwest corner of the suite has historically served as the First Lady's dressing room, study, or bedroom and has a walk-in closet and bathroom. The suite is also served by a walk-through closet leading to the bedroom, which also has a large bathroom. The room currently used as a living room, immediately west of the Yellow Oval Room, was historically used as the president's private bedroom until the 1970s.
